= Composite armour =

Type of vehicle armour

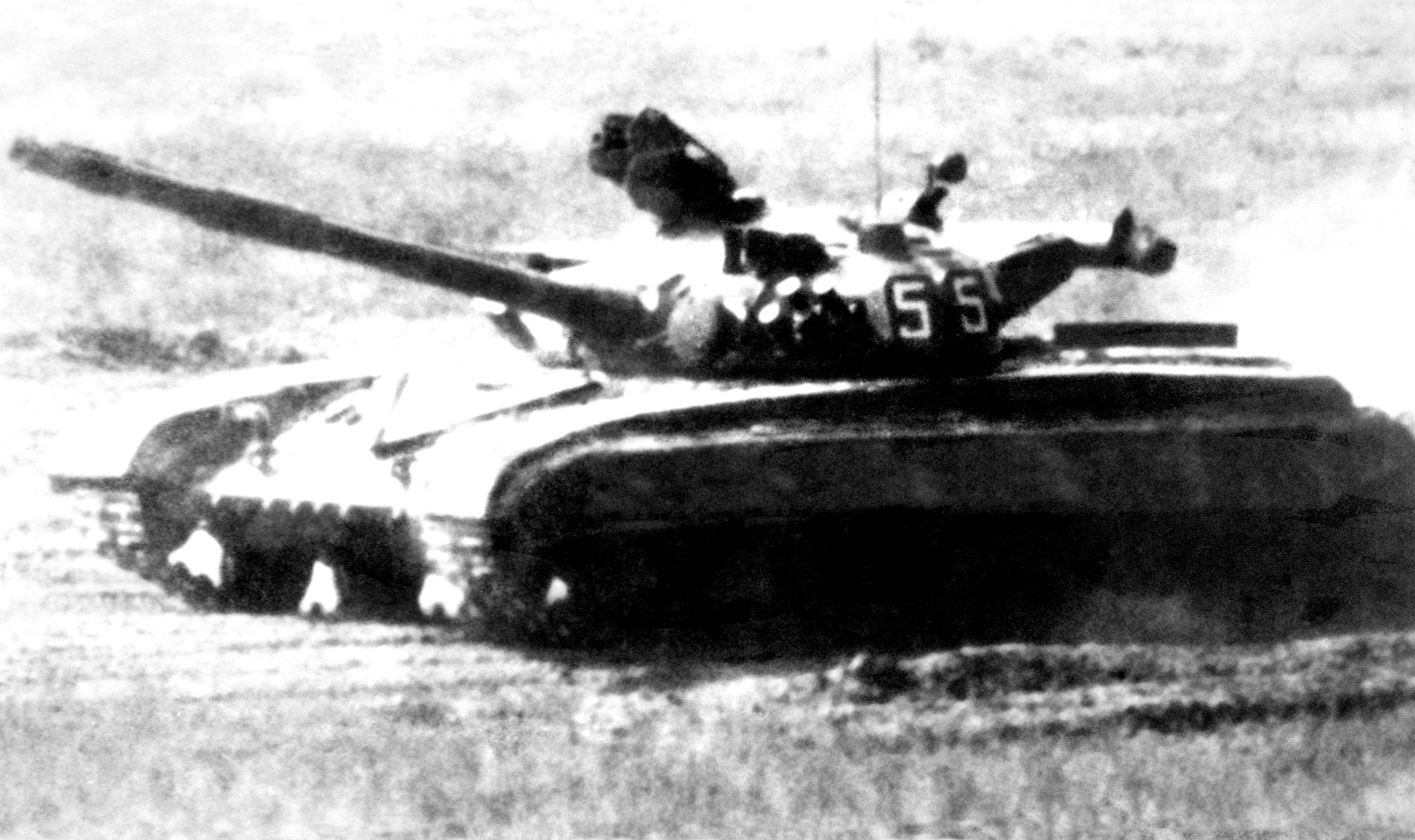
The Soviet T-64 was the first mass-produced tank with composite armour

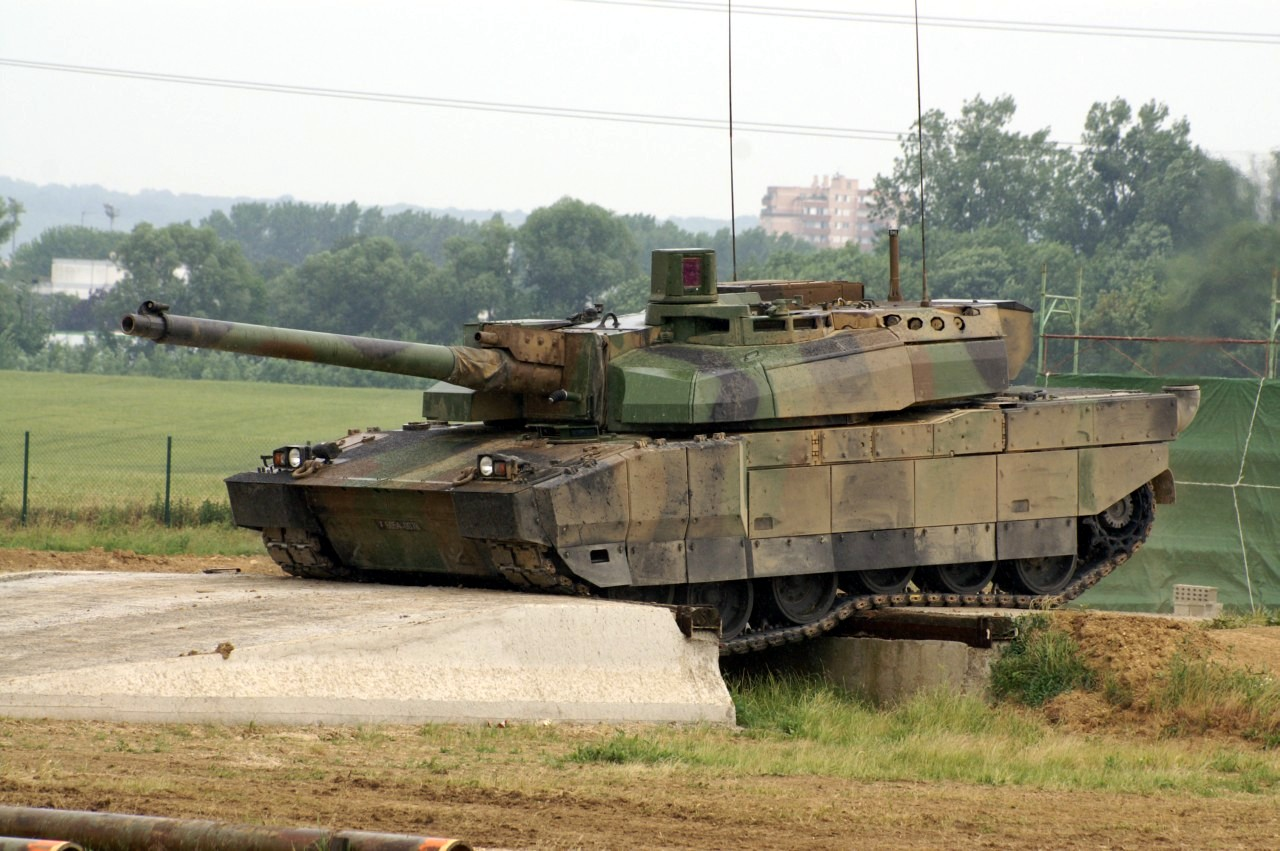
The Leclerc tank is equipped with NERA (Non-explosive reactive armour)

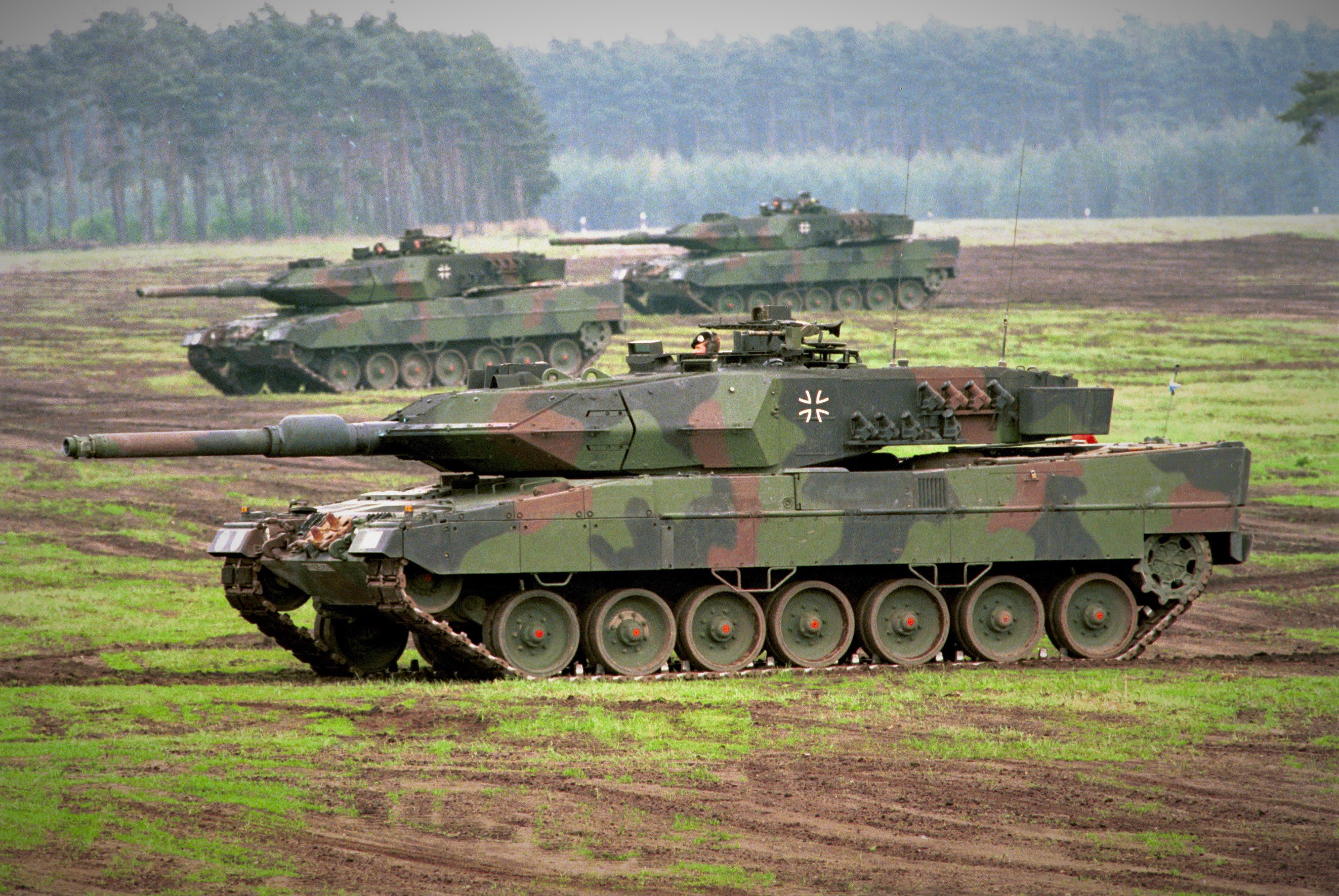
Depending on the operating state, the Leopard 2 has various extended armour elements such as bomb protection for the top, cage armour, extended mine protection (A6M) or additional armour in the form of composite armour MEXAS or AMAP

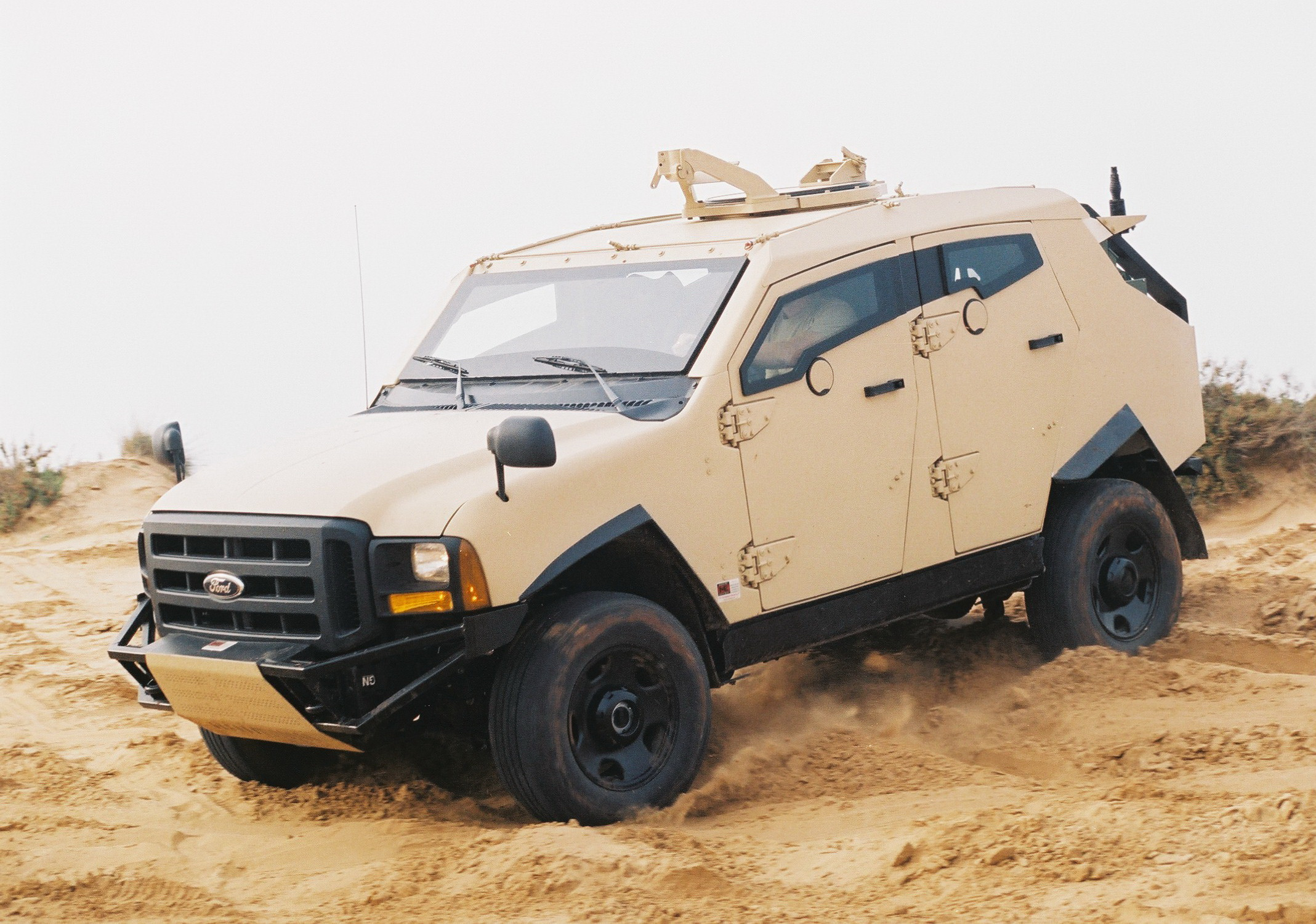
Plasan SandCat light (5t) military vehicle featuring integrated composite armoured body

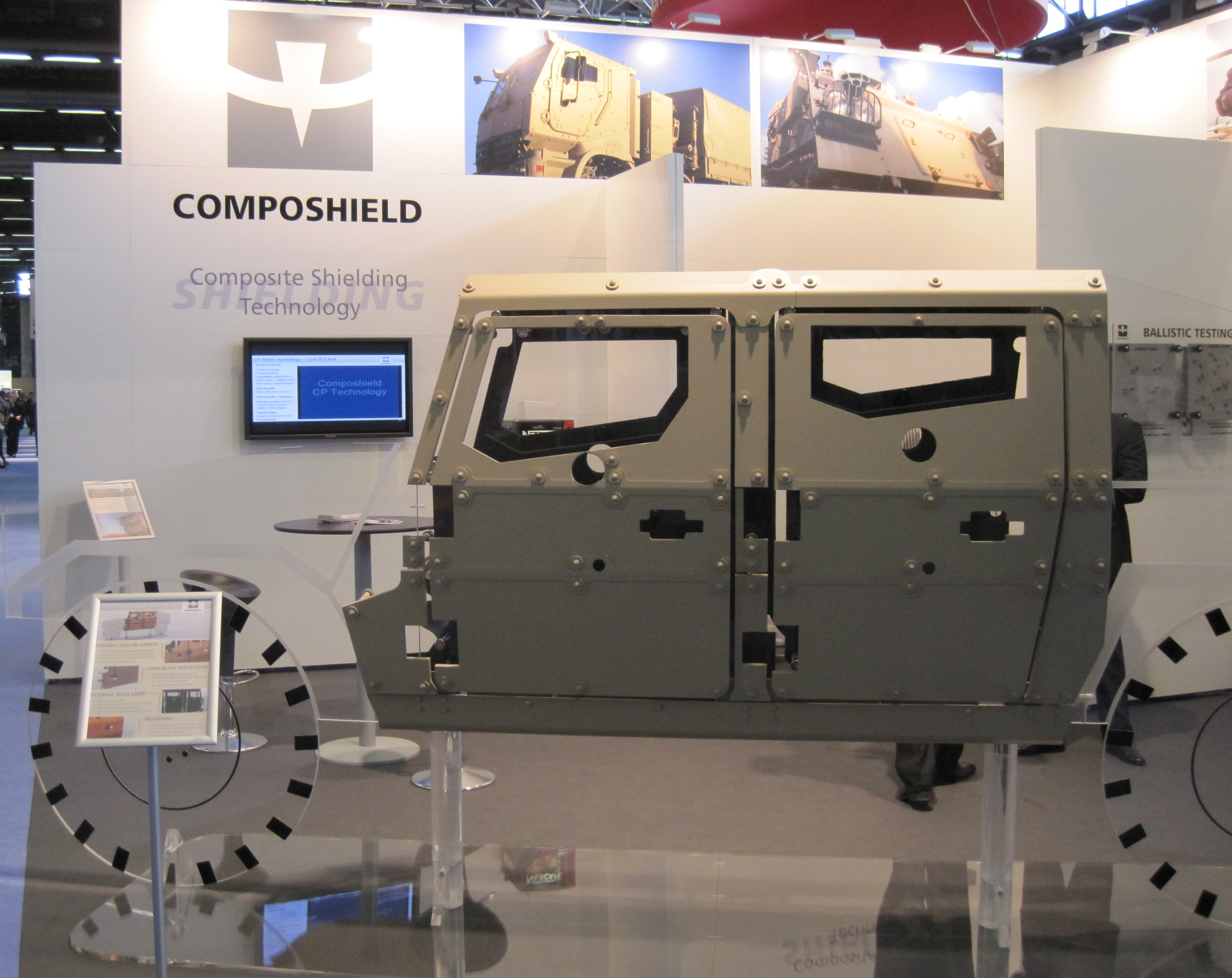
Vehicle add-on armour kit manufactured by Composhield

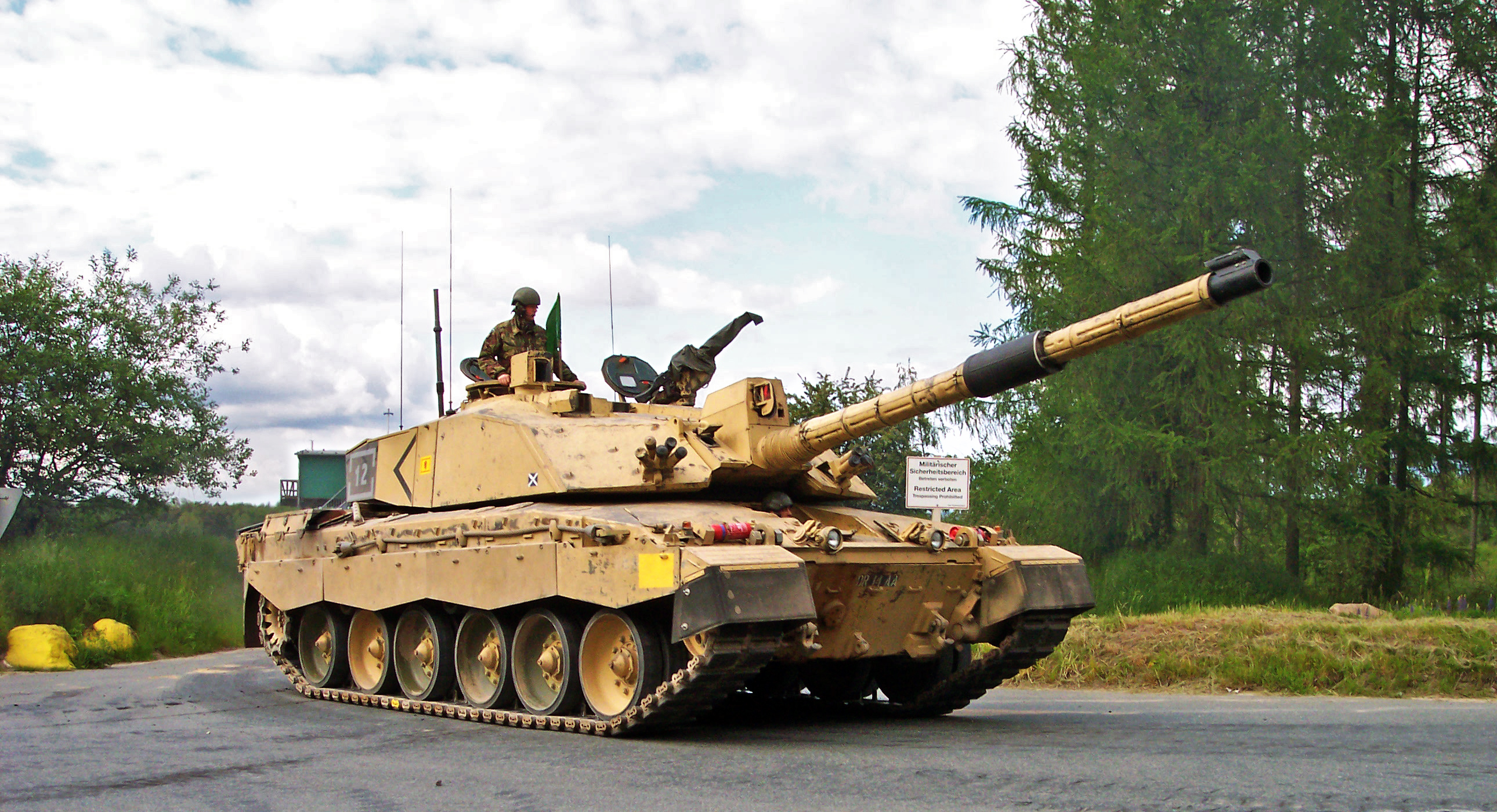
The British Army's Challenger 2 main battle tank uses Chobham armour.

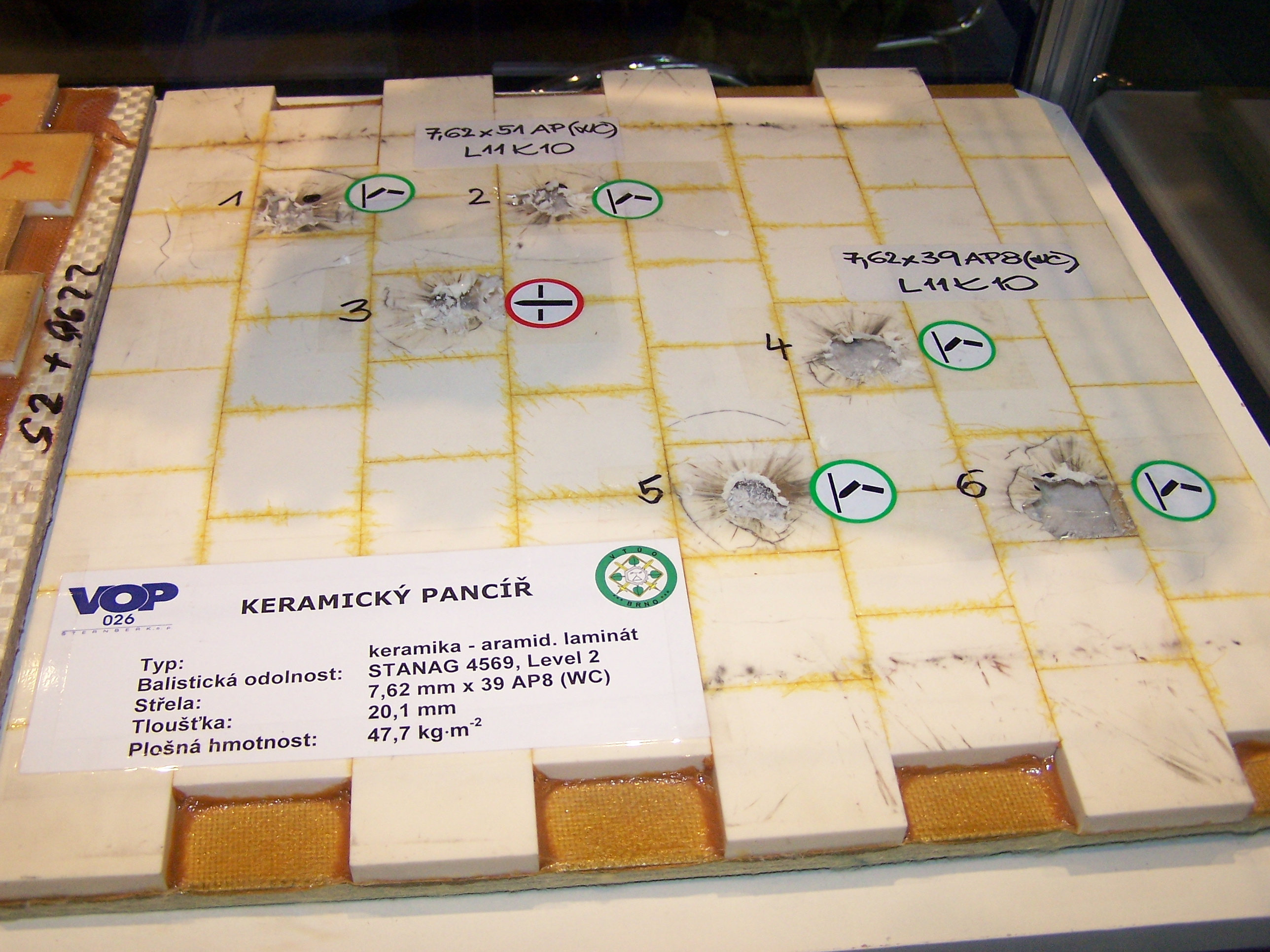
Ceramic-aramid composite laminate armour, ballistic test results

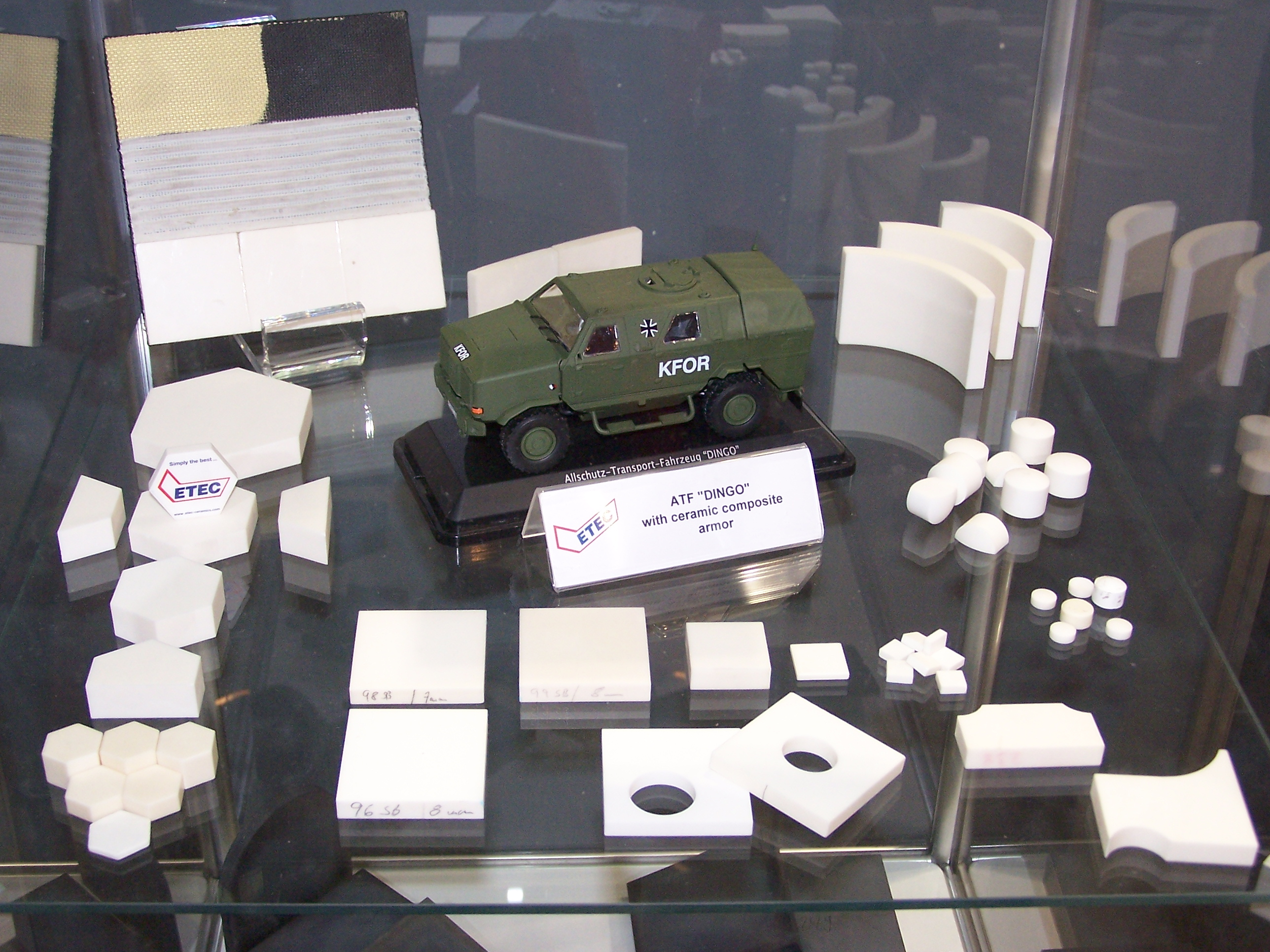
Ceramic tiles for the ATF Dingo

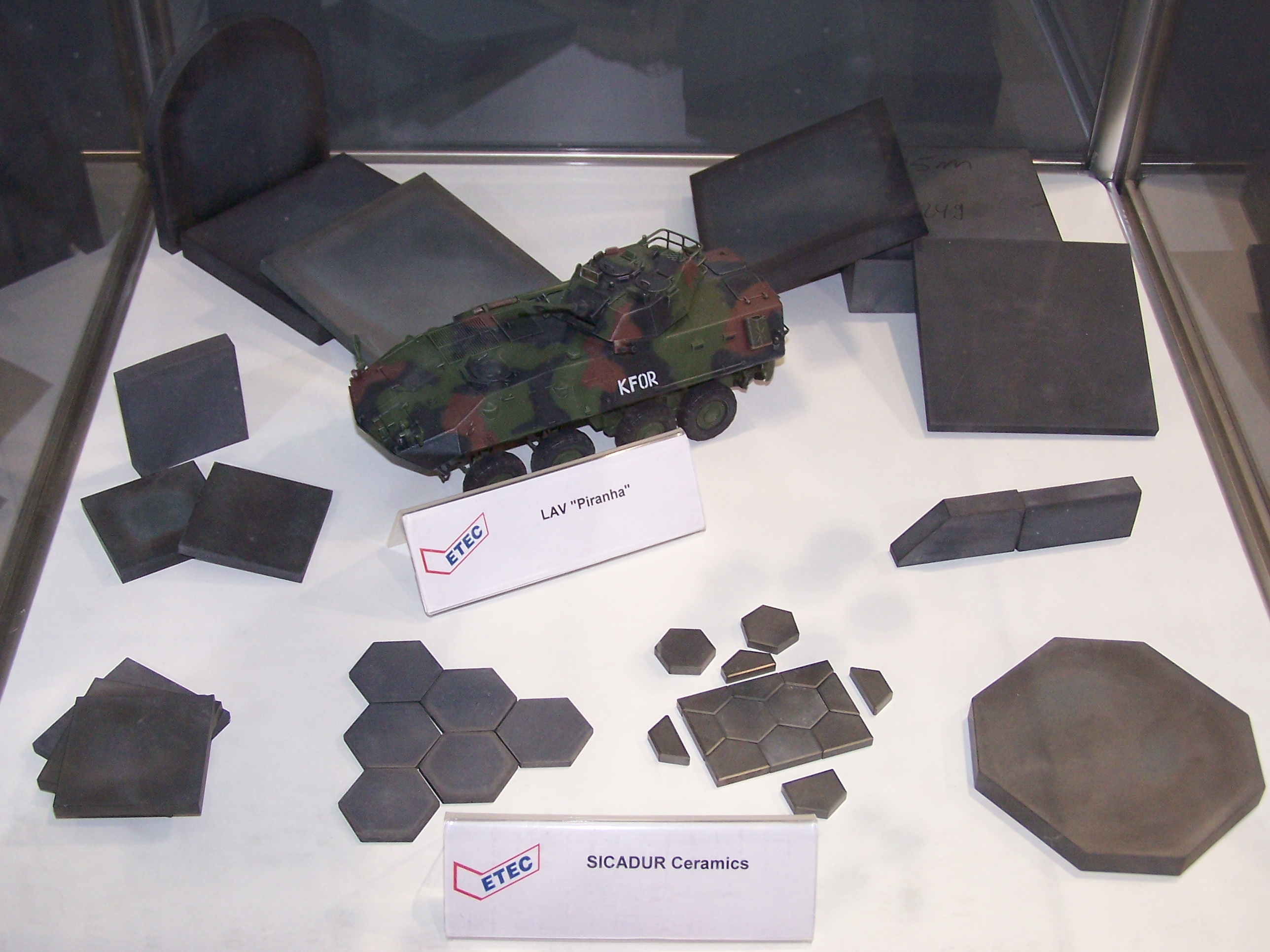
SICADUR silicon carbide tiles for vehicles (e.g. Mowag Piranha)

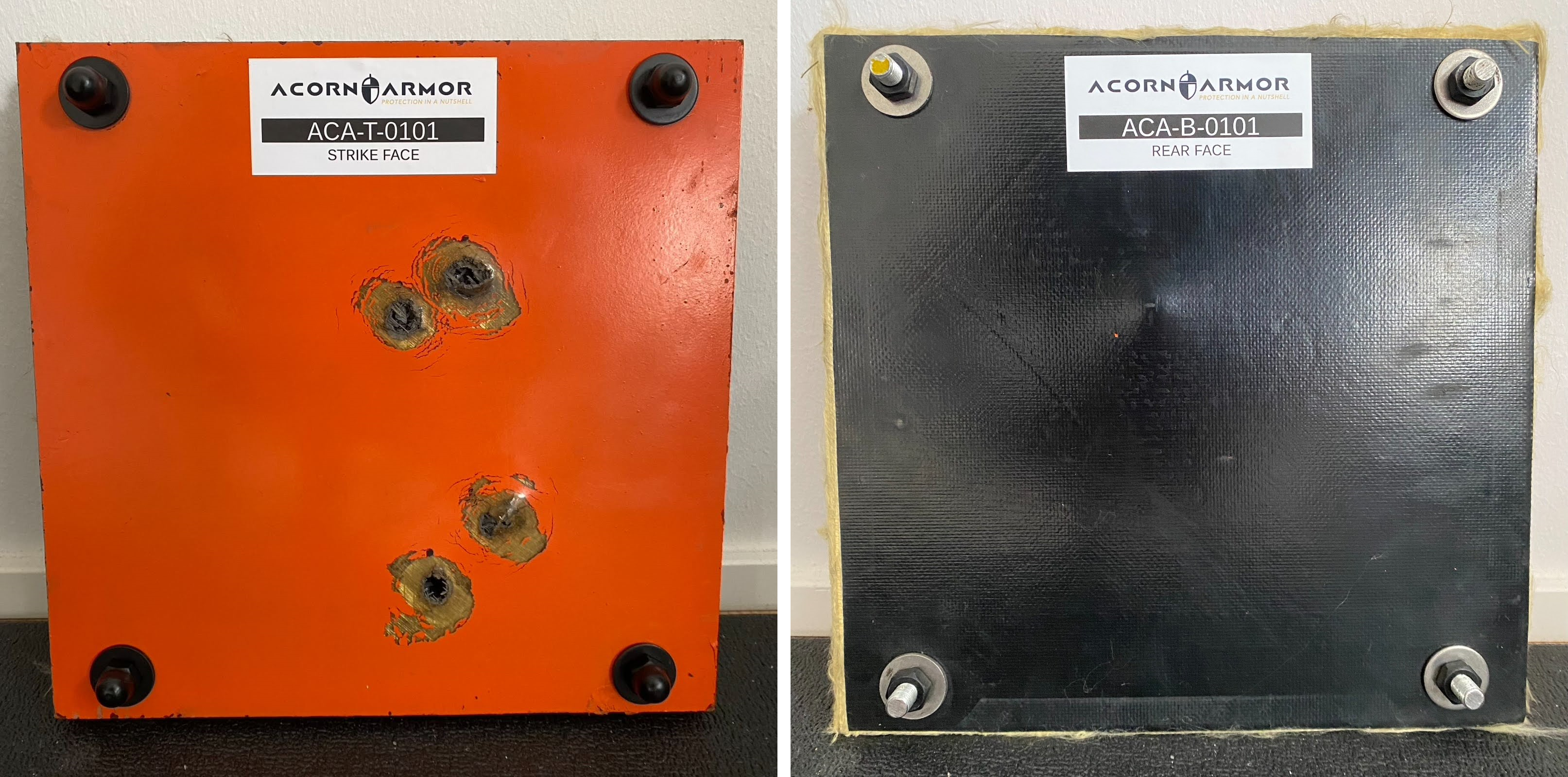
Composite ceramic armor tested in accordance with STANAG 4569 requirements.

Composite armour is a type of vehicle armour consisting of layers of different materials such as metals, plastics, ceramics or air. Most composite armours are lighter than their all-metal equivalent, but instead occupy a larger volume for the same resistance to penetration. It is possible to design composite armour stronger, lighter and less voluminous than traditional armour, but the cost is often prohibitively high, restricting its use to especially vulnerable parts of a vehicle. Its primary purpose is to help defeat high-explosive anti-tank (HEAT) projectiles.

HEAT had posed a serious threat to armoured vehicles since its introduction in World War II. Lightweight and small, HEAT projectiles could nevertheless penetrate hundreds of millimetres of the most resistant steel armours. The capability of most materials for defeating HEAT follows the "density law", which states that the penetration of shaped charge jets is proportional to the square root of the shaped charge liner density (typically copper) divided by the square root of the target density. On a weight basis, lighter targets are more advantageous than heavier targets, but using large quantities of lightweight materials has obvious disadvantages in terms of mechanical layout. Certain materials have an optimal compromise in terms of density that makes them particularly useful in this role.

== History ==
Some early ironclads used armor composed of multiple layers of thinner armor bolted or welded together. The results were greatly less effective for a given overall thickness than a single plate, but was done because making thicker plates or plates with different metallurgical properties through their thickness (for example Harvey armor) was prohibitively expensive or too technically challenging. Teak was used to sandwich layers that could not be easily fitted together, or provide a backing to catch splinters.

During WWII, in an effort to provide protection against the German Army’s Panzerfaust anti-tank weapon, an M4A3 was fitted with an armor “kit” incorporating a mixture of quartz gravel, asphalt and wood flour known as “HCR2.” This add-on armor was successfully live-fire tested in September 1945 against both the German Panzerfaust and 76mm High-Velocity Armor Piercing (HVAP) ammunition. Aside from this early test, the first serious development began as part of the US Army's T95 experimental series from the mid-1950s. The T95 featured siliceous-cored armour which contained a plate of fused silica glass between rolled steel plates. The stopping power of glass exceeds that of steel armour on a thickness basis and in many cases glass is more than twice as effective as steel on a thickness basis. Although the T95 never entered production, a number of its concepts were used on the M60 Patton, and during the development stage (as the XM60) the siliceous-cored armour was at least considered for use, although it was not a feature of the production vehicles.

The first widespread use of a composite armour appears to have been on the Soviet T-64. It used an armour known as combination K, which apparently is glass-reinforced plastic sandwiched between inner and outer steel layers. Through a mechanism called thixotropy, the resin changes to a fluid under constant pressure, allowing the armour to be moulded into curved shapes. Later models of the T-64, along with newer designs, use a boron carbide-filled resin aggregate for greatly improved protection . The Soviets also invested heavily in reactive armour, which allowed them some ability to control quality, even after production.

Among NATO nations and allies, the most common type of composite armour today is Chobham armour, first developed and used by the British in the experimental FV 4211 tank, which was based on Chieftain tank components. Chobham uses multiple non-explosive reactive armour plates (NERA), which sandwich a layer of elastomer (like rubber) between two plates of steel armour. This was shown to dramatically increase the resistance to HEAT projectiles, even in comparison to other composite armour designs. Chobham was such an improvement that it was soon used on the new U.S. M1 Abrams main battle tank (MBT) as well. The need to mount multiple angled plates, along with an outer steel layer to protect the armour array, gives the Challenger and Abrams their "slab sided" look.

The Soviets/Russians had a similar composite armour to the West's own "NERA", with rubber sandwiches between plates of steel. This armour was confirmed to be inside the T-72B's "Super Dolly Parton" armour, but is suspected to be inside the T-80A as well, since it is unlikely the Soviets would put worse armour in their "premier" tank.

== Design ==
Chobham armour defeats HEAT warheads by disrupting the high speed jet generated by the warhead. The outer steel "burster" plate detonates the shell and protects the composite array from the blast, increasing the armour's multi hit abilities. After making it through the burster plate, the jet penetrates into the first NERA plate, and begins to compress the elastomer. The elastomer quickly reaches maximum compression and rapidly expands, pushing the two steel plates in opposite directions. It is the movement of the steel plates that disrupts the jet, both by feeding more material into the jet's path, and introducing lateral forces to break the jet apart. The effectiveness of the system was amply demonstrated in Desert Storm, where not a single British Army Challenger tank was lost to enemy tank fire. (However, one was destroyed by friendly fire on March 25, 2003, killing two crew members after a HESH projectile detonated on the commander's hatch causing high-velocity fragments to enter the turret.) Chobham-type armour is currently in its third generation and is used on modern western tanks such as the British Challenger 2 and the American M1 Abrams. The Abrams is also unique in its usage of depleted uranium armour plates in conjunction with composite armour, increasing overall vehicle protection. The Leopard 2A4 is similar in its use of tungsten inserts.

== Use ==
All modern third-generation main battle tanks use composite armour arrays in their construction. While many of these vehicles feature the composite armour permanently integrated with the vehicle, the Japanese Type 10 and Type 90 Kyū-maru MBTs, French Leclerc, Iranian Karrar, Turkish Altay, Indian Arjun, Italian Ariete and Chinese Type 96/98 and Type 99 tanks use a modular composite armour, where sections of the composite armour can be easily and quickly switched out or upgraded with armour modules. The adoption of modular composite armour design facilitates far more efficient and easier upgrades and exchanges of the armour.

Soviet/Russian main battle tanks such as T-90s, T-80Us and the Chinese Type 96/99s use composite armour in tandem with explosive reactive armour (ERA), making it hard for shaped charge munitions such as HEAT projectiles and missile warheads to penetrate the frontal and a portion of their side armour. The most advanced versions of these armours such as the Relikt and Kontakt-5 armour provide protection not only against shaped charges but also kinetic energy penetrators by using the explosive force to shear the projectile apart.

Applique armour has also been used in conjunction with composite armour to provide increased amounts of protection and to supplant existing composite arrays on a vehicle. The German Leopard 2A5 featured distinctive arrowhead laminated armour modules that was mounted directly onto the turret composite arrays, increasing protection markedly above the previous 2A4 model.

Composite armour has since been applied to smaller vehicles, right down to jeep-sized automobiles. Many of these systems are applied as upgrades to existing armour, which makes them difficult to place around the entire vehicle. Nevertheless, they are often surprisingly effective; upgrades with MEXAS ceramic armour to Canadian M113s were carried out in the 1990s, after it was realized that it would offer more protection than newly built IFVs like the M2 Bradley.

== Improvised ==
In 2004, American Marvin Heemeyer used an ad hoc composite armour on his Komatsu D355A bulldozer ("which he called the MK Tank and in popular culture, the Killdozer") used in a rampage in response to a dispute with the city he lived in over a zoning issue. The armour, at some places a 1 foot (30 cm) thick, consisted of a layer of concrete sandwiched between layers of steel, successfully rendering the vehicle impervious to small arms fire and small explosives used by law enforcement in an attempt to stop the vehicle.

== See also ==
- Advanced Modular Armor Protection (AMAP)
- Chobham armour
- Combination K
- Compound armour
- Kanchan armour
- MEXAS
- Plastic composite
- Pykrete
