= United Shoe Machinery Corporation =

Defunct manufacturer of industrial machinery

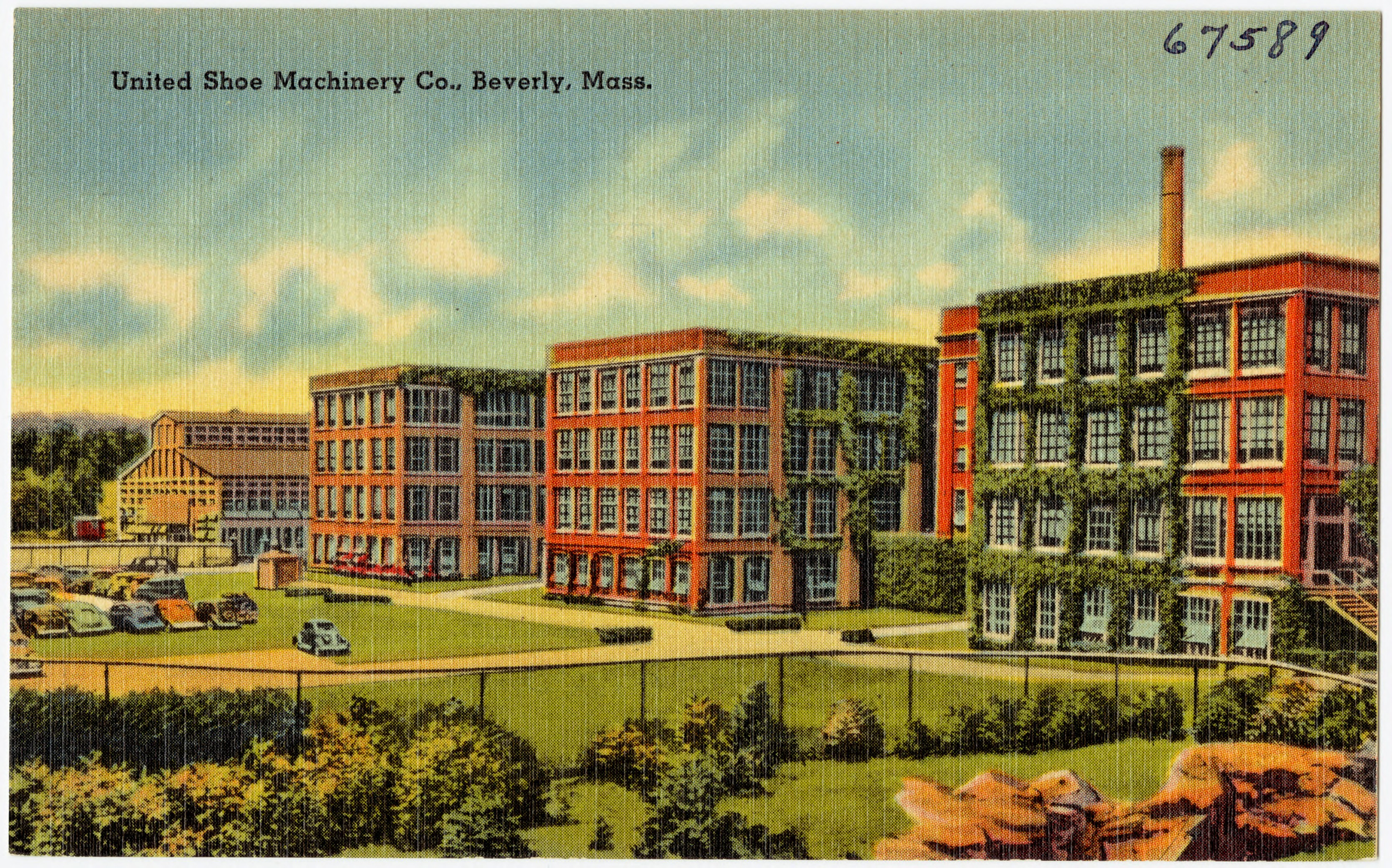
A vintage postcard with the United Shoe Machinery factory in Beverly, Massachusetts

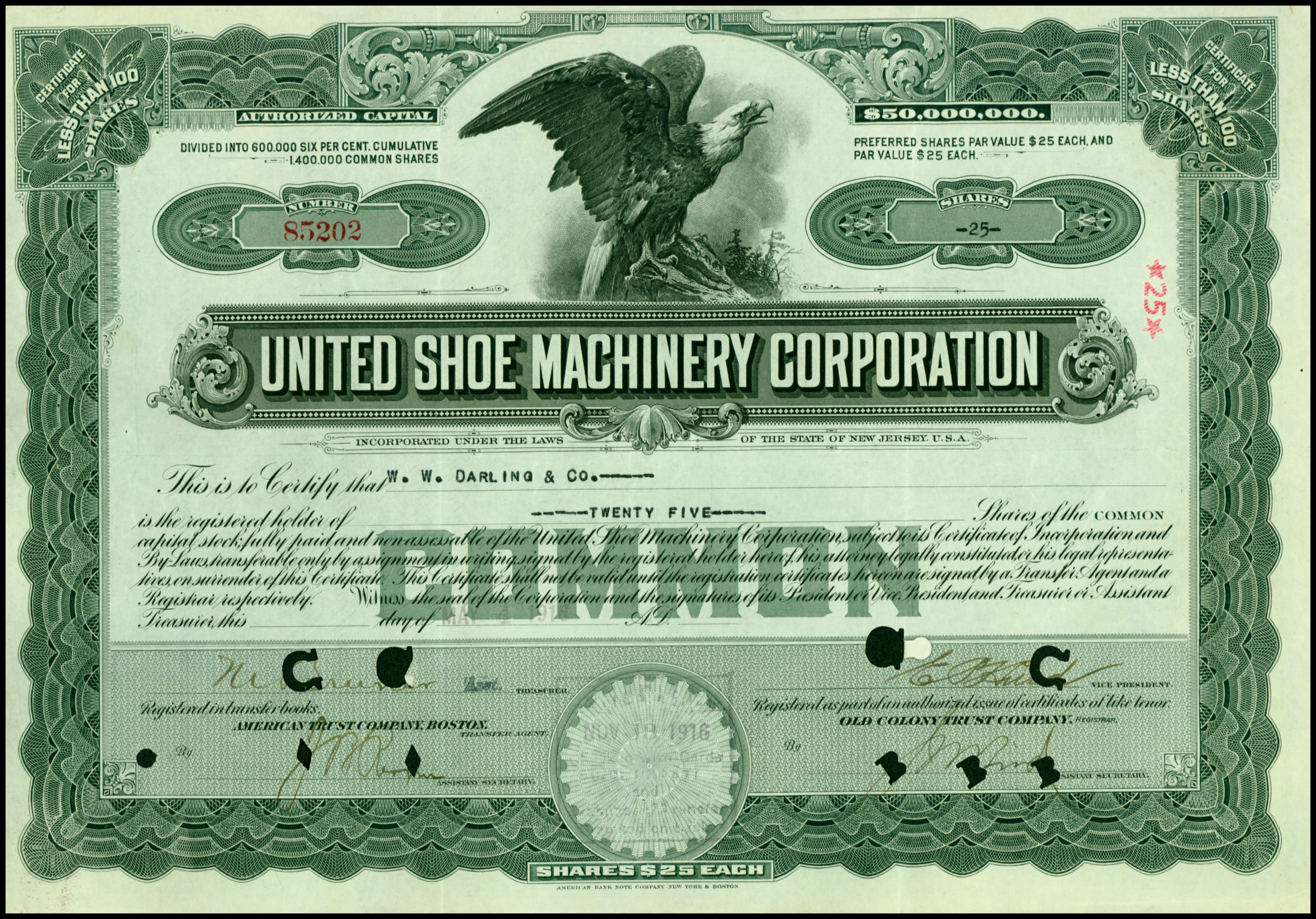
Share of the United Shoe Machinery Corporation, issued 4. May 1916

United Shoe Machinery Corporation (USMC) was a U.S.-based manufacturer of various industrial machinery, particularly for the shoe manufacturing industry and monopolized the American shoe machinery business. It was an important federal government's defense contractor during the World War I, Interbellum years, World War II and the Cold war era, which developed and manufactured various land and aircraft armaments, as well as components for the military hardware made by other manufacturers. Founded in Beverly, Massachusetts, its corporate headquarters were eventually relocated to Boston, with key production facilities scattered around Massachusetts. It had subsidiaries in other countries including British United Shoe Machinery in England.

== History ==
The Smithsonian National Museum of American History provides the following account of the history of the United Shoe Machinery Corporation.

The United Shoe Machinery Company was formed in 1899 by the consolidation of three shoe machinery firms in the industry: Goodyear Shoe Machinery Company; Consolidated McKay Lasting Machine Company; and McKay Shoe Machinery Company. The new company continued the practice previously followed by its constituent firms of renting machinery that it manufactured instead of selling it. After the 1899 merger, United grew quite rapidly. In 1903, it began construction of a new factory in Beverly, Massachusetts about thirty-five miles from Boston. At its peak, this company employed 9,000 workers and produced eighty-five percent of all shoemaking machines in the United States. By 1910, it had an eighty percent share of the shoe machinery market with assets reaching forty million dollars, and it had acquired control of branch companies in foreign countries. In 1917, the United Shoe Machinery Corporation, incorporated in 1905, absorbed the United Shoe Machinery Company. The United Shoe Machinery Corporation had its headquarters in Boston and its main manufacturing plant in Beverly, Massachusetts. In 1968, the United Shoe Machinery Corporation changed its name to USM Corporation. In 1976, United Shoe Machinery Company merged with Emhart Industries and produced the modern-day Emhart Corporation. In 1989, in order to resist a two billion dollar takeover attempt by a New York investment group (which included oil heir Gordon P. Getty), Emhart merged with Black & Decker Corporation. The merged company operates from Black & Decker's headquarters in Towson, Maryland. The company headquarters in Farmington, Connecticut, were closed in June 1989.

Since its founding, the United Shoe Machinery Company was embroiled in legal disputes and controversial business practices. By 1916, the factory sent out 24,000 machines per year. The company leased out its shoe manufacturing equipment, rather than selling it. A boot factory could use fifty different machines to stay competitive. The Beverly site had food halls seating 700 employees, break rooms, leisure facilities, apprenticeship and a hospital. The company designed, built and tested the machines, and then disassembled them and sent them to customer factories.

In December 1947 the US government brought proceedings against USM alleging a breach of the Sherman Antitrust Act in that the company had been a monopoly since 1912. A "trial of prodigious length" followed, with the verdict going against USM, but the corporation wasn't broken up and the judgement and remedy was confirmed by the Supreme Court in 1954.

The government renewed its complaint in 1967 but although the District Court ruled nothing had changed, this time the Supreme Court ordered USM to be broken up. It was required to divest a substantial part of its business and change its leasing strategy over a 10-year period, with the sell-off raising $400 million. It continued to innovate within the shoe manufacturing industry, but it also developed such modern inventions as the hot glue gun, the soda can pop-top, the drive mechanism for the Lunar Roving Vehicle, and pop rivets for the Concorde. However, the attempts at diversification failed to generate enough money and in 1976 the company, heavily in debt, was bought by Emhart Corporation, now Stanley Engineered Fastening, an organisation half its size.

In 1987 a management buyout led by the management of British United Shoe Machinery (BUSM) bought the shoe machinery operations, including USM, from Emhart Industries and control of USM then passed to the UK as part of the newly created United Machinery Group (UMG). Subsequently, the USM headquarters moved into a new high-tech factory outside Boston. In 1995 UMG was acquired by Venture Capitalists Apax Partners Corporate Finance Limited, but after financial difficulties UMG went into administration in 2000.

The anti-trust case against the United Shoe Machinery Company have drawn comparisons to subsequent anti-trust cases against IBM and Microsoft.

== Research and development ==
The corporation pioneered the development and production of a synthetic leather materials.

During the Interbellum era corporate Research Division designed and developed gun mounts, gun turrets, fire control equipment, automatic guns, automatic fuse setting, bomb release equipment, automatic conveying equipment, and automatic rocket projectors, as well as many other things of military interest.

During the postwar years, the corporate engineers experimented intensively with armoured fighting vehicles of modular design, kindred by common chassis, common armor elements, interchangeable armament, automatic loading for weapons, and low weight in order to attain high speeds, coupled with various comfort add-ons provided for the housed crew.

== Production items ==
Armoured fighting vehicles

- T54E1 medium tank
- Turtle-series, IVI prototype gun motor carriages (33 tons, tracked, turreted, 4-man crew situated below the upper hull line, 600-hp engine, armor thickness 3 to 6 1/2 inches, dimensions: 18'7" long, 9'4" wide, 7' tall, carrying various promptly interchangeable turrets, different main armament with automatic feed system; plus twin 30 mm driver's coaxial machine gun, one .30 caliber commander's machinegun, and one .50 caliber AA machinegun each; weapon stabilization in addition to driver stabilization, internal air cleaning and air conditioning systems)

- IVI Gun Motor Carriage, quadruple .50 caliber machine gun (main)
- IVI-C Gun Motor Carriage, twin 37 mm guns
- IVI-D Gun Motor Carriage, single-barrel 75 mm tank gun (gunner's compartment separated from the crew compartment, allowing the gunner to move with the weapon in elevation and in azimuth)

- prototype heavy armored combat vehicles with oscillating turret
- prototype armored combat vehicles with externally mounted main gun

Gun turrets and armament

- tank turrets

- T20E1 (Fisher Body Div. of General Motors) Medium Tank turret mounting the 76 mm M1 gun with an autoloader
- T22E1 (Chrysler's DTA) Medium Tank turret mounting the 75 mm M3 gun equipped with an autoloader
- T77 Gun Motor Carriage multibarrel .50 caliber machine gun mount T89
- High Speed Harmonic Drive Speed Reducer for slow and stabilized rotation of shipboard or tank heavy gun turrets

- tank guns

- 37 mm tank gun M5

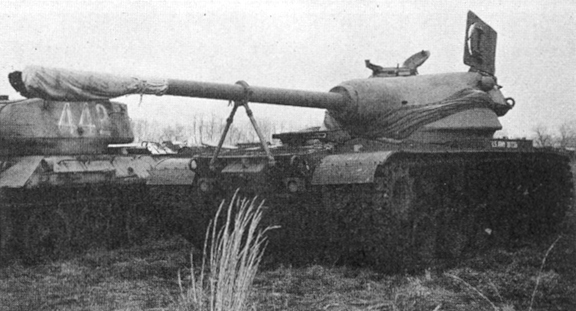
T54E1 medium tank, designed and constructed by the United Shoe

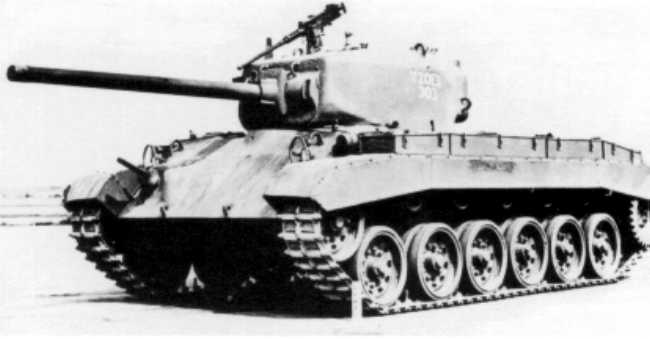
T20-series of tanks carried a gun turret, developed by the corporation
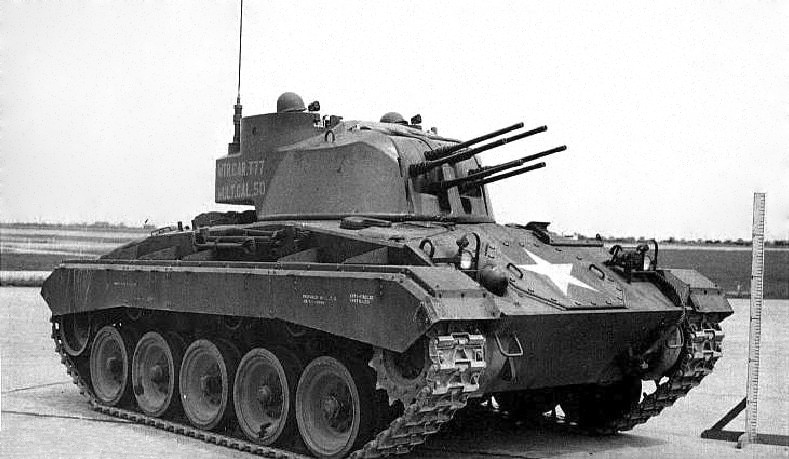
T77 gun motor carriage housed T89 multibarreled gun mount
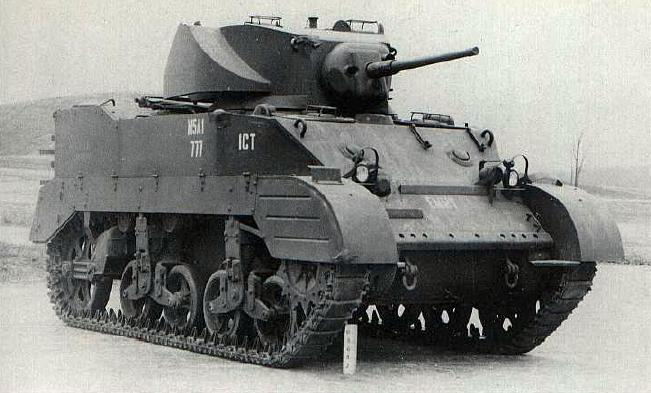
37 mm tank gun M5 installed at a turret of M5A1 light tank

Infantry weapons and artillery pieces

- 37 mm antitank gun M3
- 37 mm towed antitank gun carriage
- shell ramming
- fuze setting devices

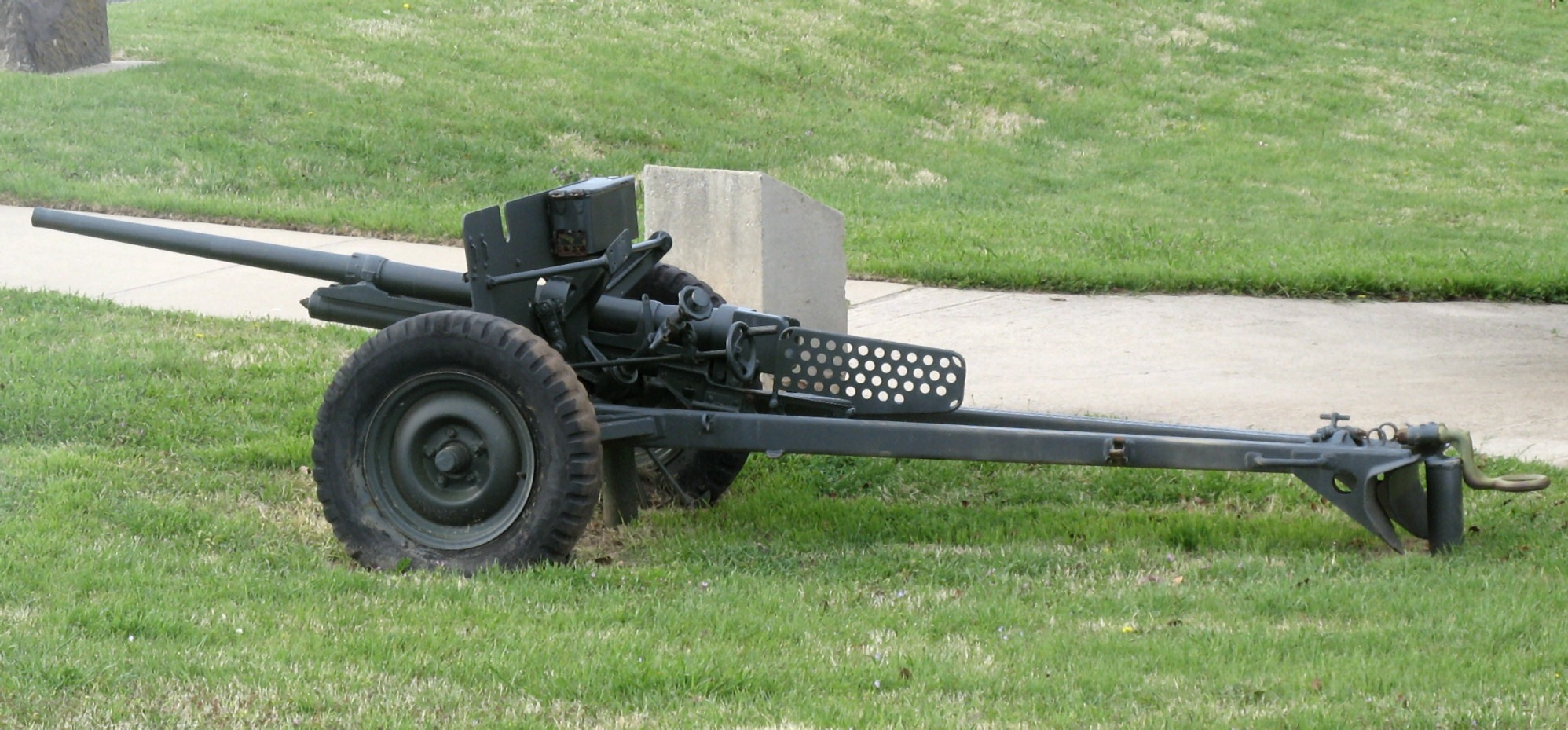
M3 antitank gun and carriage, both manufactured by the United Shoe

Weapon systems

- aircraft gun turrets

- B-17 Flying Fortress ball turret
- YA-14 Shrike and XP-71 pressurized turret

- waist gun mounts

- XB-40 Flying Fortress and XB-41 Liberator power-operated M5 waist gun mounts

- remote hydraulic controls for special M2 machine gun installations for aircraft
- gas-piston operated guns
- machined items for attack and utility helicopters (e.g. UH-1 Iroquois)

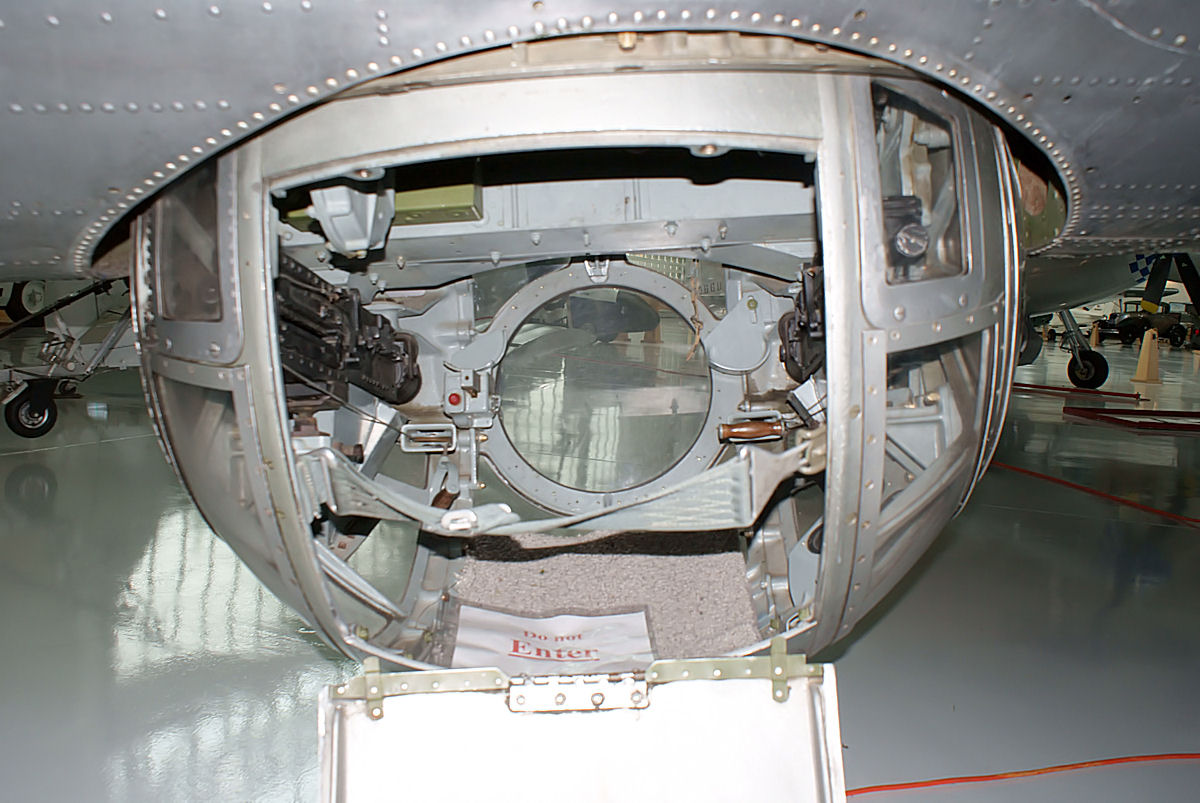
B-17 Flying Fortress ball turret developed together with Lockheed Aircraft

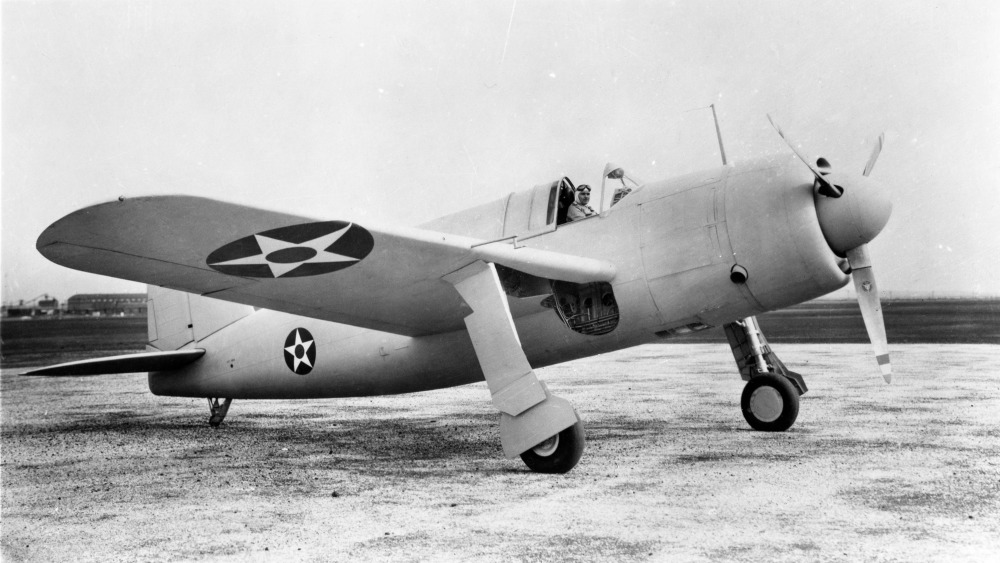
XSB2A Buccaneer featured a power turret developed together with W. L. Maxson Corp.

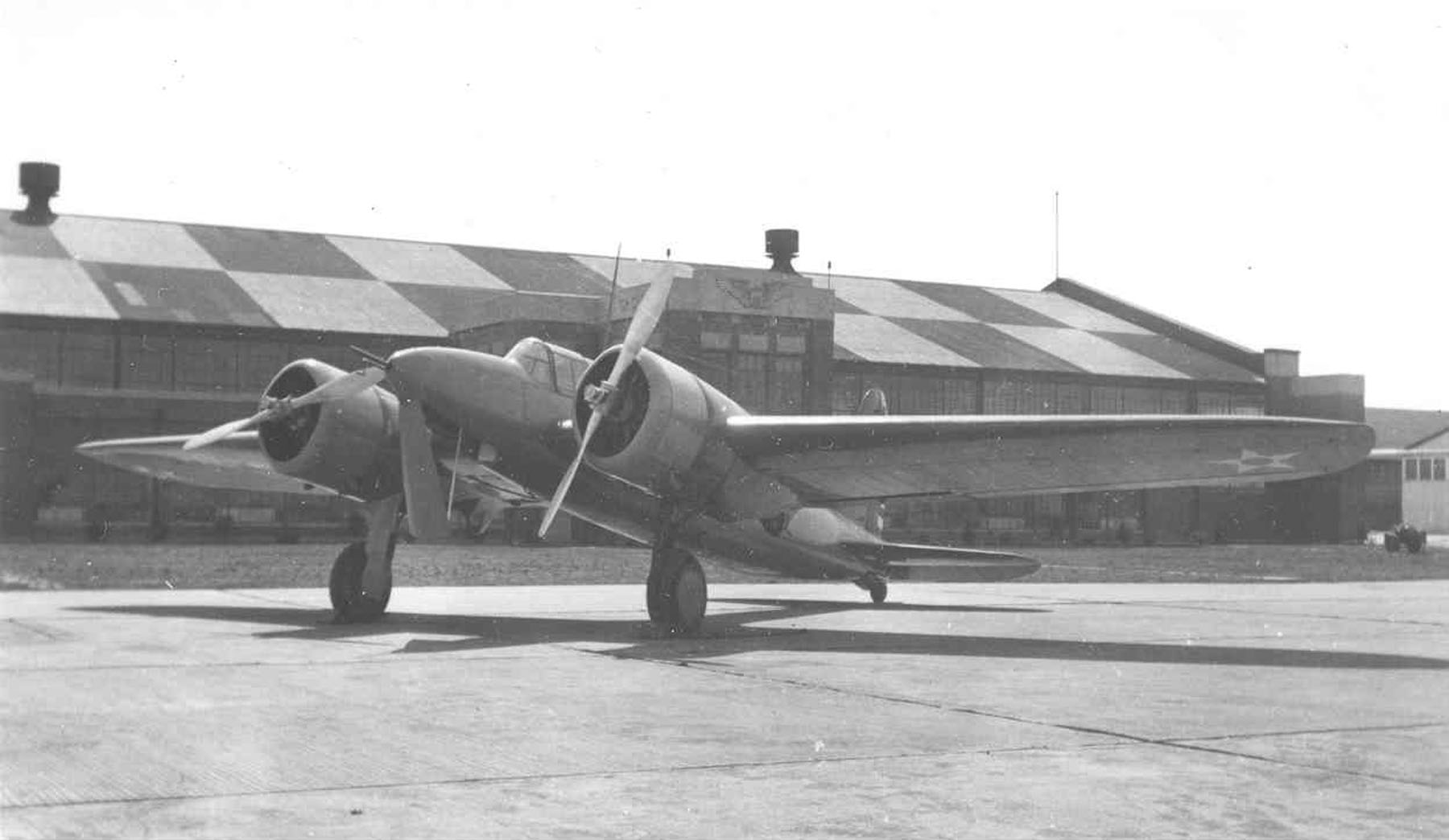
YA-14 Shrike and XP-71 were to have pressurized turrets with twin 37 mm cannons, similar to those developed by Bell Aircraft

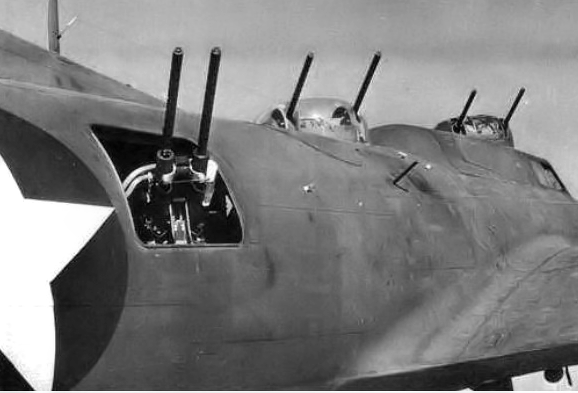
XB-40 and XB-41 featured a power-operated M5 waist gun mounts

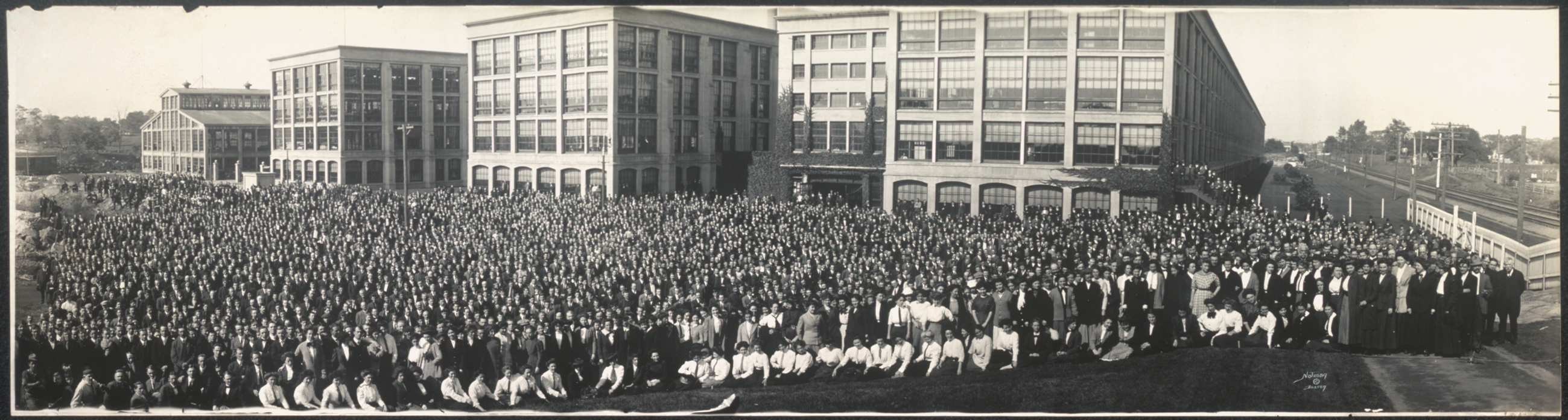
Several thousand corporate employees, the entire workforce gathered at a greenlawn in front of the factory buildings for a group photo, 1911

Aerospace equipment

- machined items for military satellites (Telstar)

Industrial machinery

- electronic component assembly machines
- automatic assembly machines for assembling military radar sets

== Structure ==
The corporation had several divisions, subsidiaries and affiliates, which were located mainly in Massachusetts.

== See also ==
- Jan Ernst Matzeliger
- United Shoe Machinery Corporation Building
- United Shoe Machinery Corporation Clubhouse

== Books ==
- Hunnicutt, R. P. (1996). Pershing: A History of the Medium Tank T20 Series (2nd ed.). Spearville, KS: Feist Publications.
- Hunnicutt, R. P. (1992). Stuart: A History of the American Light Tank (1st ed.). Novato, CA: Presidio Press. ISBN 9780891414629.
- Icks, Robert J. (1965). "WW II "Turtle series" of armored vehicles". Armor. 74 (1, January–February).
- Thomson, Harry C.; Mayo, Lida (1960). The Ordnance Department: Procurement and Supply. Washington, D.C.: U.S. Dept. of the Army, Office of the Chief of Military History.
- Veronico, Nick (2014). Bloody Skies: U.S. Eighth Air Force Battle Damage in World War II. Mechanicsburg, PA: Stackpole Books. ISBN 9780811714556.
