= Combination K =

Type of Soviet composite armor

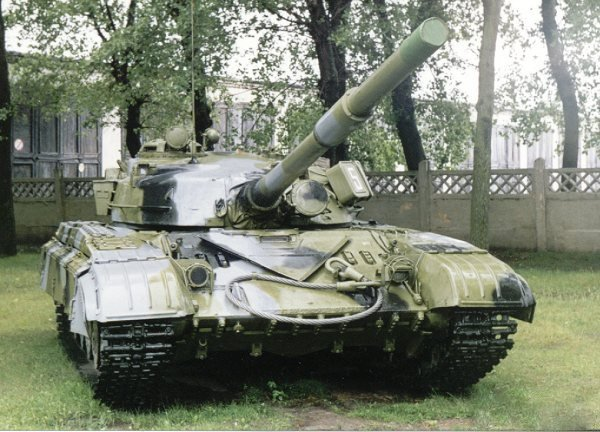
A T-64, the first tank to use Combination K

Combination K is a type of composite armor. It is fitted onto the Soviet Union tank T-64.

== Description ==
Combination K is a three-layer composite armor consisting of an outer and inner layer of steel and a middle layer of fiberglass glass-reinforced plastic ("steklotekstolit") and a pack of ceramic (allegedly corundum) plates.

Some T-72 tanks have their gun turret frontal armour composed of three layers: outer and inner layers of steel and a middle layer of sand or quartz ("kvartz", probably the origin of the "K" in the name; also implies some relationship between the T-64A and the kvartz composite). The gun turrets are cast with internal cavities on each side of the main tank gun, which are later filled with the desired composite material. Some Russian sources describe the material as "peschannye sterzhni" ("sand rods"), likely made of a form of silica similar to fused silica developed in the US for the T95 Medium Tank prototype in the 1952 program for equipping tanks with protection against shaped charges and high-explosive anti-tank (HEAT) rounds without sacrificing protection against kinetic energy penetrators. The same design of cast-steel turret with cavities for composite insets is reportedly used also in some earlier variants of T-80 and T-90 tanks with cast turrets. The more modern T-90A and T-90M, use an Object 187-derived slab-sided welded turret, which offers an easier and more optimal way to mount inserts of various forms, including non-explosive reactive armour (NERA). More effective inserts can lead to radically increased protection. Reportedly, during the Second Chechen War no T-90A suffered a penetrating hit, with some allegedly surviving up to seven RPG-7 hits that failed to penetrate the armor.
