= Composhield =

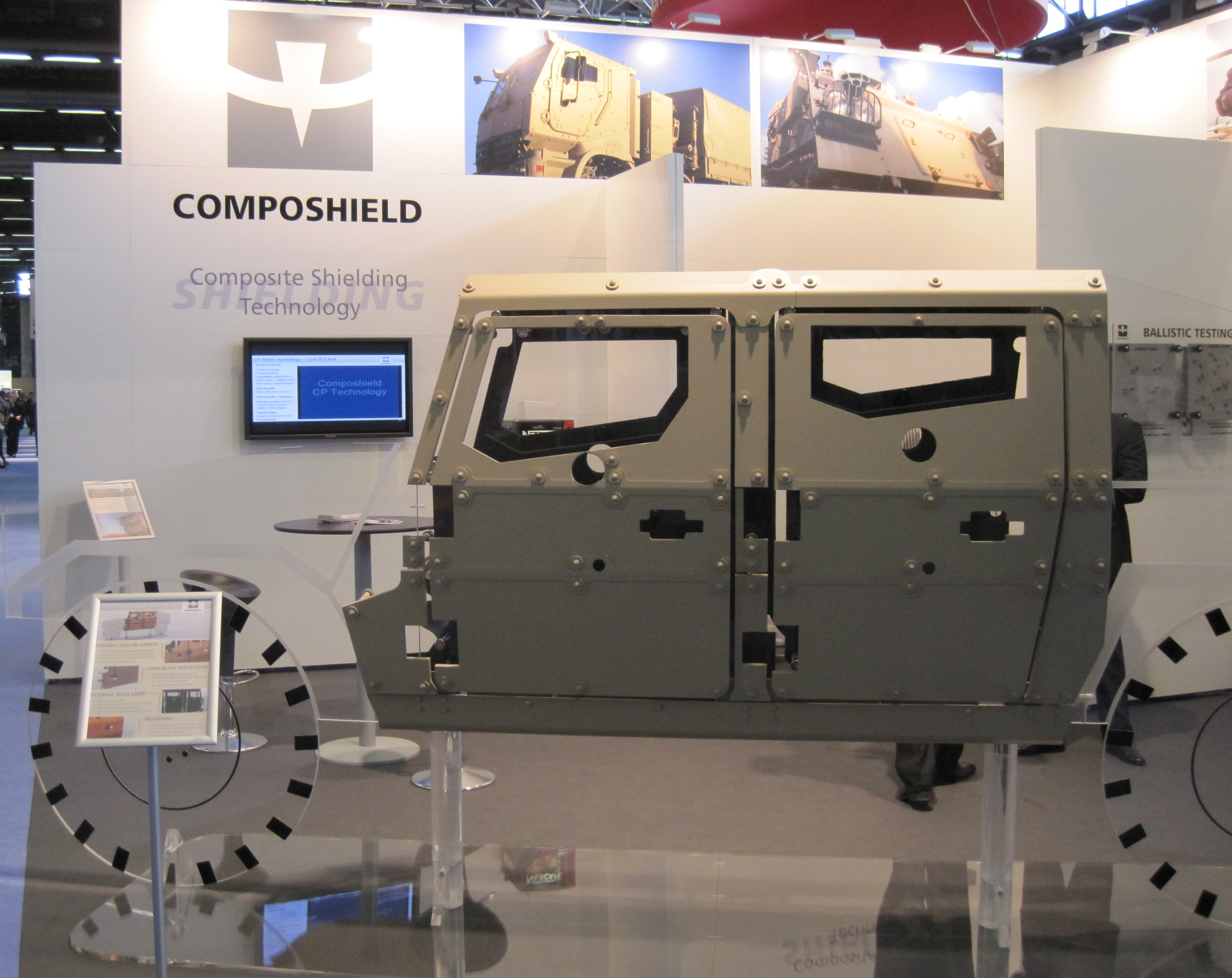
- Type: Privately held company
- Industry: Defence
- Founded: 2000
- Headquarters: Lystrup, Aarhus, Denmark
- Products: Vehicle armor, Composite armor, Structural Armor
- Subsidiaries: AMTANK Armor
- Website: www.composhield.com

Composhield A/S is a Danish armor manufacturer and integrator established in 2000. It develops, manufactures and assembles custom-built vehicle armour systems as well as composite add-on armor protection kits for lightweight military tactical trucks and APCs (wheeled & tracked) and commercial vehicles.

Composhield was created in 1996 as an internal research project in the company Giantcode A/S. In 2000 it became an independent company as Composhield A/S. In 2007 Composhield A/S formed a joint-venture, AMTANK Armor LLC., together with American Tank & Fabricating Company, to serve the North American market. Composhield is a privately held company.

== Products ==
The products offered protect against custom and standard threats, such as those defined by STANAG 4569 The add-on armor kits are based on Ceramic-polymer technology that allows them to withstand extreme dynamic loads compared to traditional steel armor.
The company produces polymer compact reinforced composites as for structure protection.
At IDEX 2013 Composhield presented a low weight RPG protection kit based on 3D add-on armor modules.

Composhield composite armor is used in various military vehicles, several of which have been fielded in theaters of operation such as Afghanistan.

Vehicles with armored components designed or manufactured by Composhield

- (Spain) - Urovesa Vamtac
- (Germany) - Mercedes-Benz Actros
- (Denmark) - HMMWV Jülkat
- (Indonesia) - Pindad ANOA
- (United Arab Emirates) - Nimr II
- (Canada) - Streit Typhoon
- (Saudi Arabia) - AVF Tuwaiq
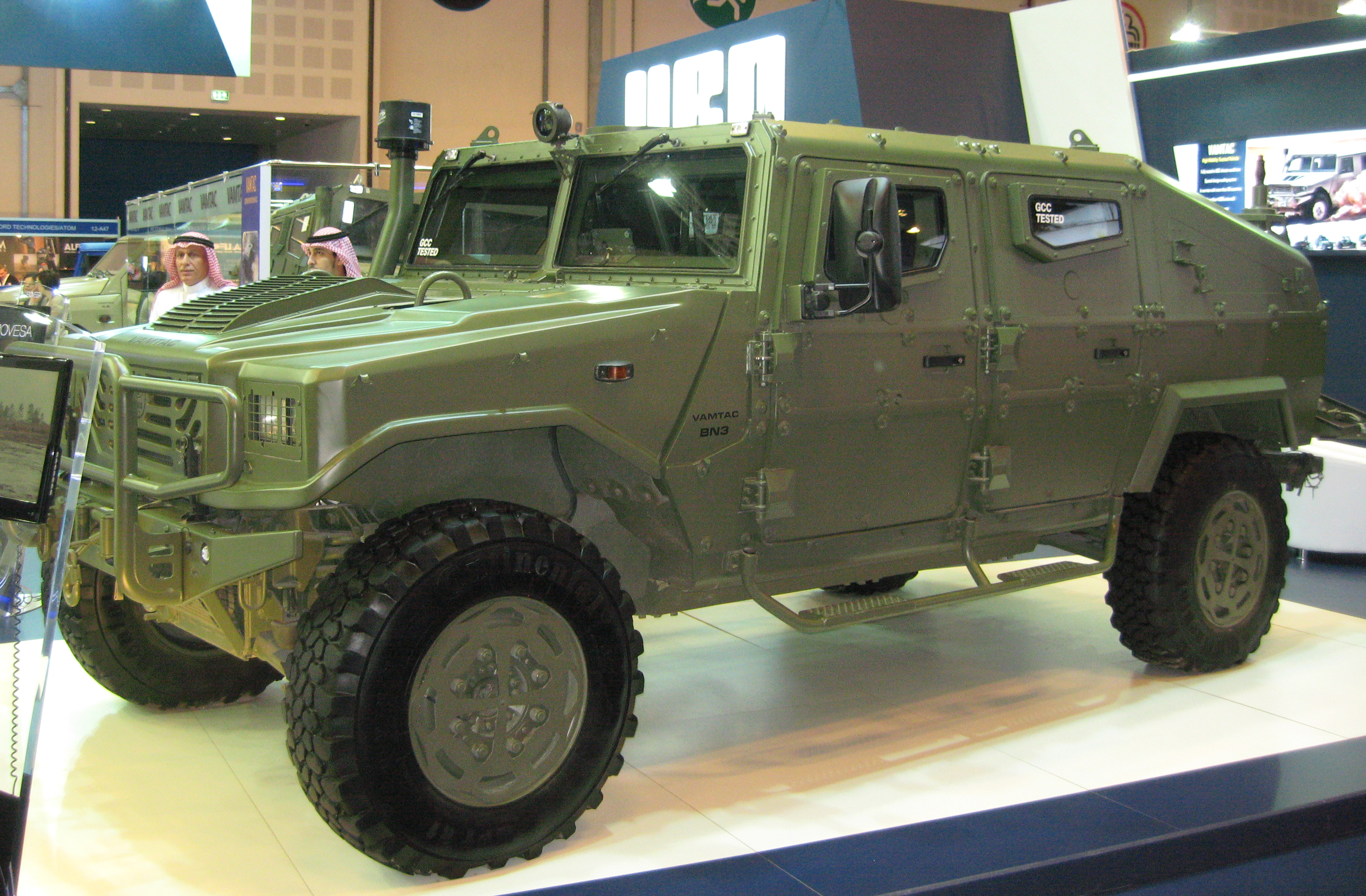
Urovesa Vamtac

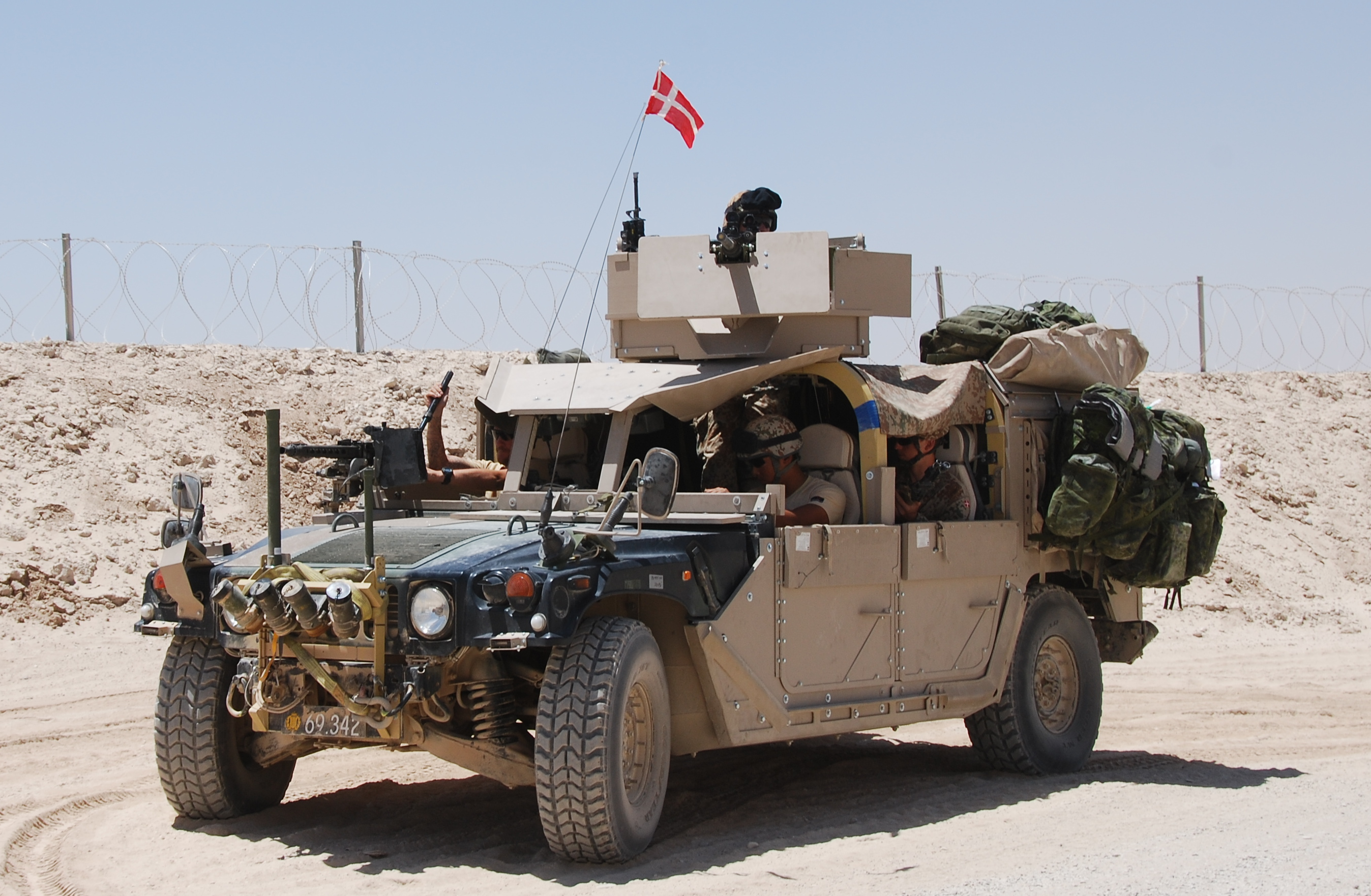
Danish Jülkat HMMWV

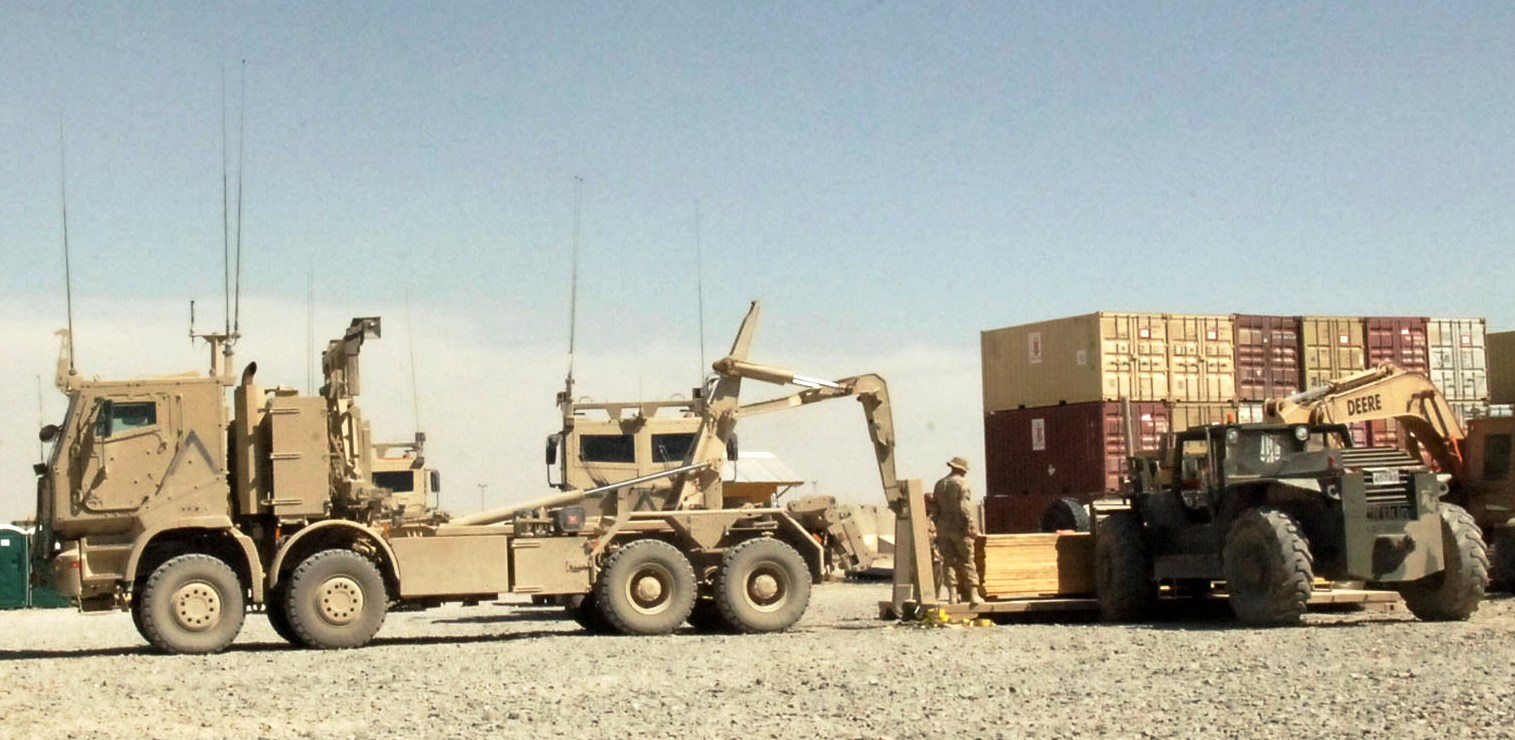
Mercedes Benz Actros

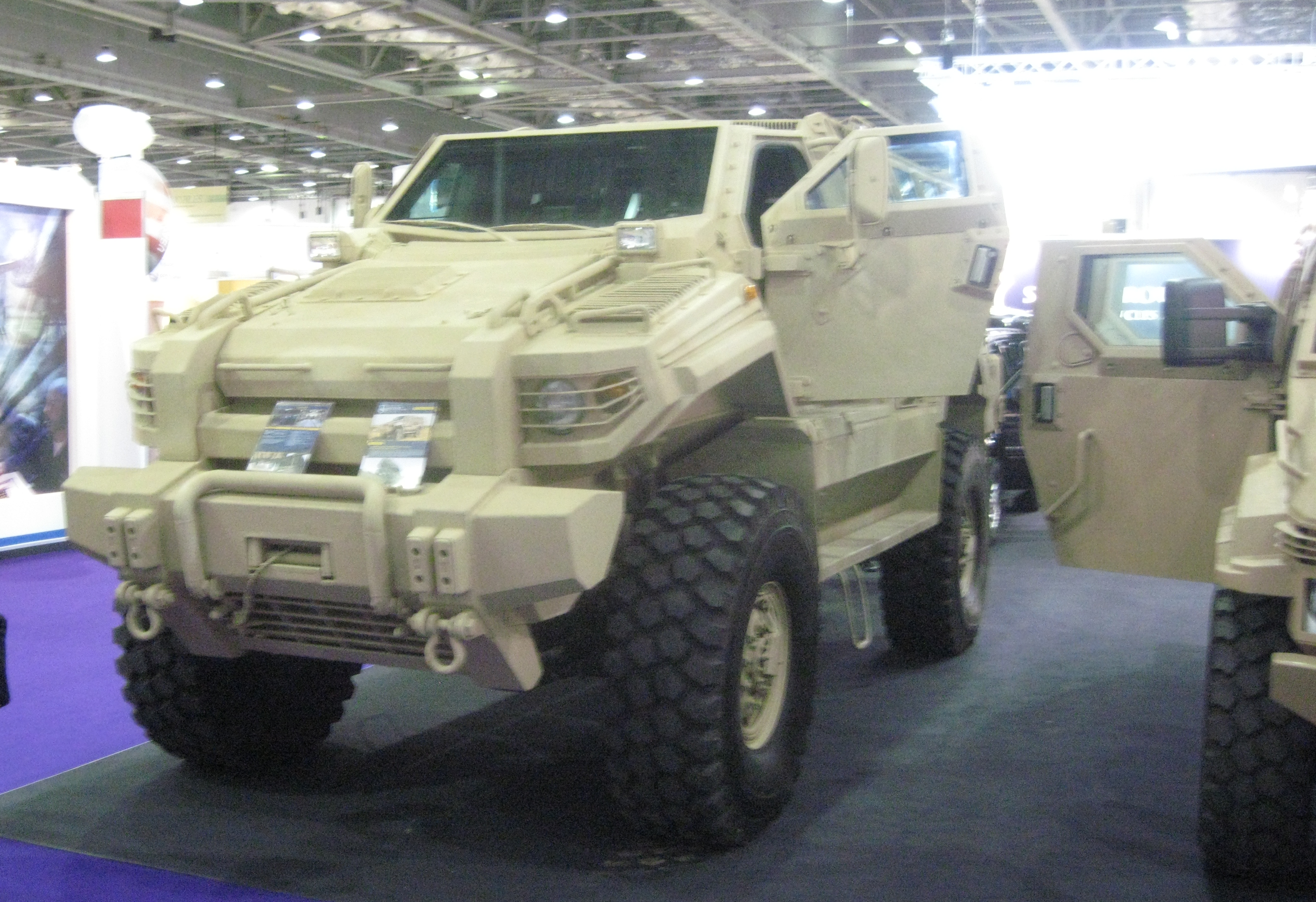
Streit Typhoon vehicle on display at DSEi 2011
