= T54 (American tank) =

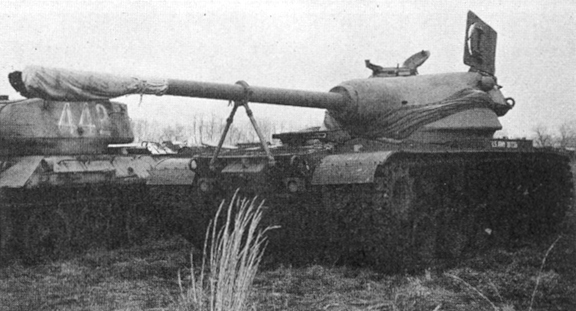
- The T54E1 Tank with its 105mm gun in an oscillating turret in travel position, showing the open loader's hatch, September 1962.
- Type: Main battle tank
- Place of origin: United States

Production history
- Designer: Rheem Manufacturing Company, United Shoe Machinery Corporation, Detroit Arsenal
- Designed: 1951 to 1957
- Manufacturer: Rheem Manufacturing Company, United Shoe Machinery Corporation, Detroit Arsenal
- Variants: T54E1, T54E2

Specifications
- Mass: Combat loaded: 110,000 lb (50 t); Unstowed: 103,000 lb (47 t)
- Length: Gun forward with fenders: 450.2 in (11.44 m)
- Width: 143 in (3.6 m)
- Height: 121.8 in (3.09 m)
- Crew: 4:(commander, gunner, driver, loader)
- Armor: Upper glacis: 110 mm (4.3 in) at 60° = 220 mm (8.7 in) LoS
- Main armament: T54: 105mm L/67.3 T140; T54E1: 105mm L/67.3 T140E2; T54E2: 105mm L/67.3 T140E3
- Secondary armament: Cupola mount: .50 cal (12.7 mm) HB M2 machine gun Coaxial: .30 cal (7.62 mm) M1919A4E1 machine gun
- Engine: AV-1790-5B; 810 hp (600 kW) gross 704 hp (525 kW) net
- Power/weight: T54: 13.6 gross hp/ton T54E1 12.5 gross hp/ton T54E2: 13.8 gross hp/ton
- Suspension: Torsion bar
- Operational range: 70 mi (110 km)
- Maximum speed: 27 mph (43 km/h)

The T54 was a series of prototype American tanks of the 1950s with three different turrets, all armed with a 105 mm gun, mounted on the M48 Patton chassis. The T54 had a conventional turret with an autoloader with 3 shells, the T54E1 had an oscillating design with an autoloader, and the T54E2 had a conventional turret with a human loader.

The turret on the T54E1 was similar to that of the T69 in its oscillating design and in that it held a crew of three and a nine-round drum autoloader under the gun. The T54E1 was abandoned in 1956 and in 1957 the entire project was cancelled in favor of the T95 Medium Tank.

== Development ==
In December 1950, the Army Equipment Development Guide recommended that a 105 mm tank gun be pursued. By 6 July 1951, OTCM (Ordnance Technical Committee Minutes) 33842 officially initiated the development project with two new vehicles designated: the 105 mm gun tank T54, and the 105 mm gun tank T54E1.

The T54's 105 mm T140 gun was a lighter version of the 105 mm T5E2, which was the armament of the T29 Heavy Tank. Designed for use with an autoloader, their breeches were inverted and fixed rounds were used. When modified for use with the T54E1 oscillating turret, the gun was designated as the 105 mm gun T140E2.

== Variants ==
- T54: armed with a 105 mm T140 in a conventional turret with an autoloader.
- T54E1: armed with a 105 mm T140E2 in an oscillating turret with an autoloader.
- T54E2: armed with a 105 mm T140E3 in a conventional turret with a human loader.
