= Bell YFM-1 Airacuda =

Interwar-era bomber destroyer aircraft of the United States Army Air Corps

YFM-1 Airacuda
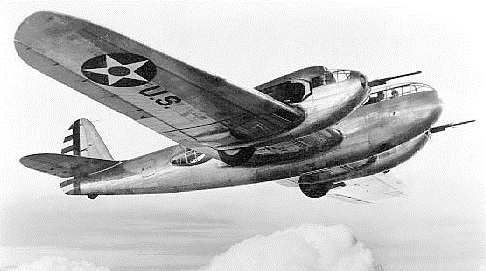

General information
- Type: Interceptor
- National origin: United States
- Manufacturer: Bell Aircraft
- Primary user: United States Army Air Corps
- Number built: 13

History
- Manufactured: 1937–1939
- Introduction date: 23 February 1940
- First flight: 1 September 1937
- Retired: 1942

The Bell YFM-1 Airacuda was an American heavy fighter aircraft, developed by the Bell Aircraft Corporation for the United States Army Air Corps during the mid-1930s. It was the first military aircraft produced by Bell. Originally designated the Bell Model 1, the Airacuda first flew on 1 September 1937. The Airacuda was marked by bold design advances and considerable flaws that eventually grounded the aircraft.

The Airacuda was Bell Aircraft's answer for a "bomber destroyer" aircraft. Although it did see limited production, and one fully operational squadron was eventually formed, only one prototype and 12 production models were ultimately built, in three slightly different versions.

== Design and development ==
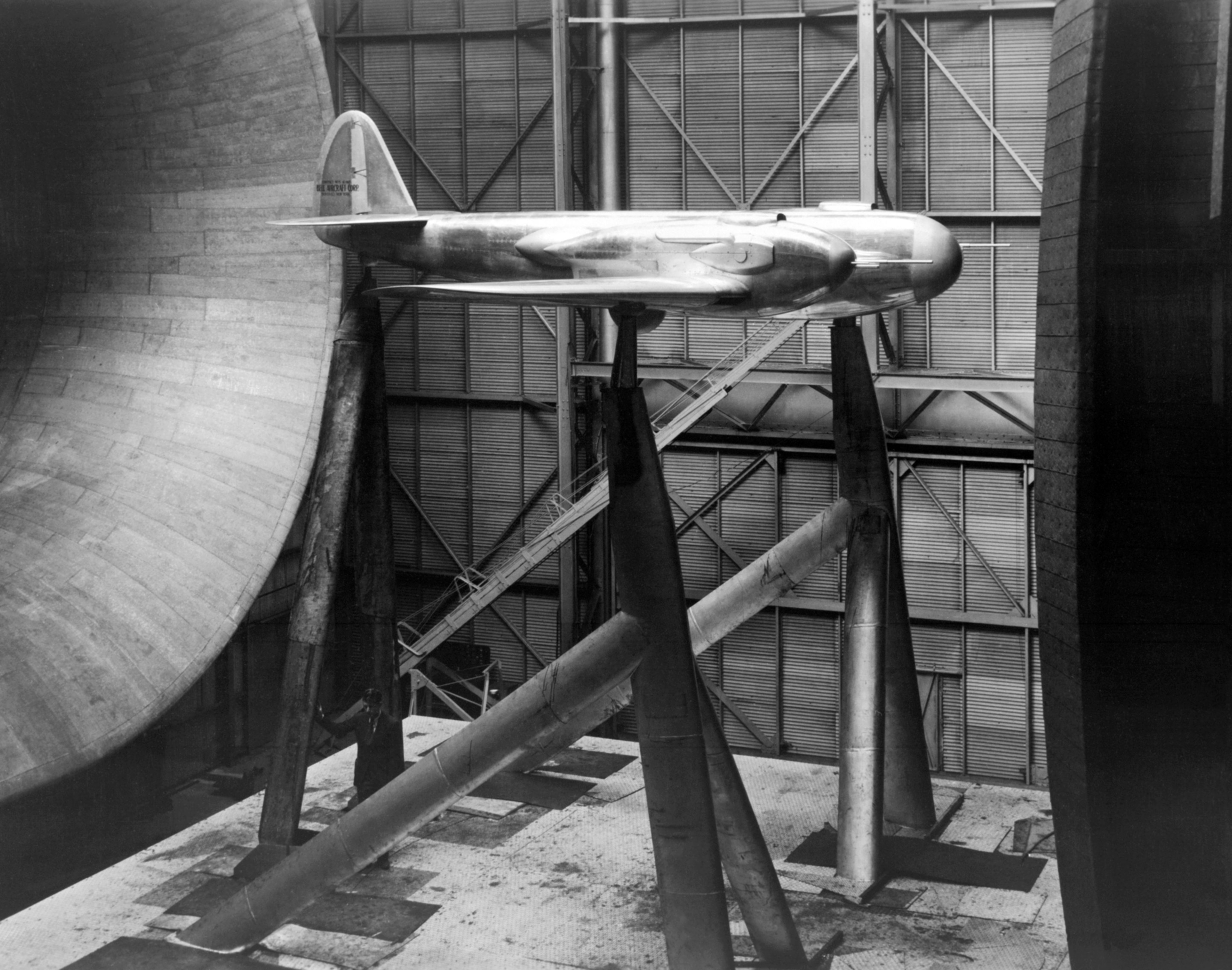
Bell FM-1 mockup at Langley wind tunnel

In an effort to break into the aviation business, Bell Aircraft created a unique fighter concept touted to be "a mobile anti-aircraft platform" as well as a "convoy fighter". Created to intercept enemy bombers at distances beyond the range of single-seat fighter interceptors, the YFM-1 (Y, service test; F, fighter; M, multiplace) was an innovative design incorporating many features never before seen in a military aircraft, as well as several never seen again. Using a streamlined, "futuristic" design, the Bell Airacuda appeared to be "unlike any other fighters up to that time".

According to Major Alexander De Seversky's 1942 book Victory Through Air Power, the Bell Airacuda "represents a great engineering achievement. But its designation as 'convoy fighter' is erroneous, since that requires different disposition of armament. With its maximum firepower directed forward, it really offers a preview of an effective long-range interceptor fighter."

A forward-firing 37 mm (1.46 in) M4 cannon with an accompanying gunner was mounted in a forward compartment of each of the two engine nacelles. Although capable of aiming the cannons, the gunners' primary purpose was simply to load them with the 110 rounds of ammunition stored in each nacelle.

The crew of five included the pilot and gunners; a copilot/navigator who doubled as a fire-control officer, using a Sperry Instruments "Thermionic" fire control system (originally developed for anti-aircraft cannon) combined with a gyro-stabilised and an optical sight to aim the weapons; and a radio operator/gunner armed with a pair of machine guns stationed at mid-fuselage waist blisters for defense against attack from the rear.

An unusual feature of the Airacuda was the main door for entry. The door was opened and pulled down and hinges folded in on three steps for the crew to climb into the aircraft.

=== Design flaws ===
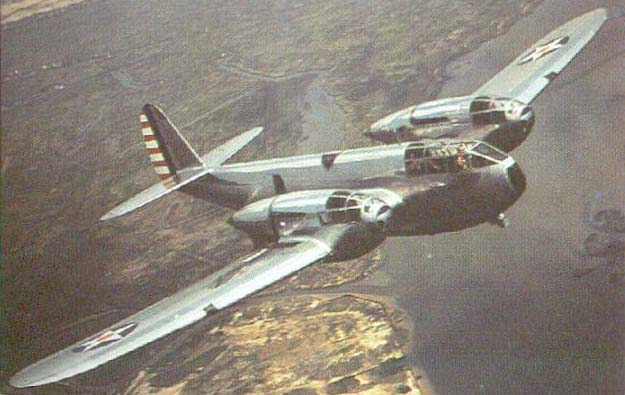
Bell YFM-1 during testing

The Airacuda was plagued with problems from the start. The lofty performance estimates were unobtainable as, despite its sleek looks, the Airacuda was heavy and was slower than most bombers. In the event of interception by enemy fighters, the Airacuda was not maneuverable enough to dogfight, while the meager 600 lb (270 kg) bombload was of little use in the intended fighter-bomber role. Even the 37 mm cannons were of less value than predicted. The cannons had a tendency to fill the gun nacelles with smoke whenever fired and, additionally, fears persisted as to how the gunners would escape in an emergency, with the propellers directly behind them. An emergency bailout would have required both propellers to be feathered, though additional provision was made with the use of explosive bolts on the propellers to jettison them in the event of a bailout. As with other types armed with the 37 mm M4, the low muzzle velocity of the weapon made it difficult to use as an aerial weapon, limiting the useful range.

The Allison V-1710-41 engines, though relatively trouble-free in other types, had insufficient cooling. Like many pusher designs, they were prone to overheating while on the ground, since there was no propwash blowing over the engines to cool them. On the ground, the aircraft had to be towed to and from the runway and could only be started when the Airacuda was able to take off immediately. Even in the air overheating was not uncommon. Although designed for turbo-supercharging, the first flights were made with V-1710-9 single-stage supercharged engines that only delivered 1,000 hp (750 kW) each. Despite the 5 ft (1.5 m)-long shaft extensions, there were no problems with this feature. When the turbos were fitted to the later YFM-1, they were plagued by cranky turbo regulators that backfired continuously. An explosion during a September 1939 test flight made it apparent that the teething engine troubles would not be solved easily.

Marshall Wainwright notes that other sources indicate the first eight aircraft were to originally have been powered by Allison V-1710-13 engines fitted with GE Type B-6 turbo-superchargers (turbochargers). These aircraft were eventually delivered with improved V-1710-23(D2) engines. Wainwright further states that two of the YFM-1 airframes were changed on the production line to accept the V-1710-41 without turbo-supercharging, becoming YFM-1Bs. This is noted in a contract change dated 19 October 1939, which shows that aircraft 38-489 and 38-490 had their turbos, all associated ducting, and controls removed and V-1710-41(D2A) "altitude rated" engines installed instead. The (D2A) was essentially a -23 with higher supercharger gear ratios (8.77:1 versus 6.23:1), which allowed the motor to develop around 1,090 horsepower (810 kW) up to 13,200 ft (4,000 m) ASL. They used the same ratings and components as the altitude-rated V-1710-33(C15) Allison fitted to the original Curtiss XP-40. Allison was paid $1,690 to modify each engine.

Initial flight testing by Lt. Ben Kelsey proved the Airacuda virtually impossible to control with only one engine, as the aircraft would go into an immediate spin. Problems with stability in pitch were also encountered and had to be corrected by reducing power. Test pilot Erik Shilling described his experiences in a later book Destiny: A Flying Tiger's Rendezvous With Fate as

Flying the Bell Airacuda was a new experience for me, since it was the first pusher aircraft I'd ever flown. Its handling characteristics were foreign to anything I had ever had my hands on. Under power it was unstable in pitch, but stable with power off. While flying straight and level, if a correction in pitch was required, a forward push on the control resulted in the airplane wanting to pitch over even more. Pitch control became a matter of continually jockeying the controls, however slightly, even when the aircraft was in proper trim. The same applied if pulling back on the control. It would tend to continue pitching up, requiring an immediate corrective response. The same happened in a turn with power off, the Bell became stable in pitch. This was fortunate because during approach and landing, it was very stable, and a nice flying airplane.

The Airacuda was also saddled with a complex and temperamental electrical system and was the only aircraft ever built to rely on an independent auxiliary power unit (APU) to power both engine fuel pumps, as well as all aircraft electrical systems. Systems usually powered by an aircraft's engines were instead powered by the single generator. The generator, with its own supercharger, was located in the belly of the aircraft. In the event of a failure (and they occurred frequently), the crew was instructed to begin immediate emergency restart procedures, as the aircraft basically shut down. When the APU failed, the pilot had "NO fuel pressure, NO vacuum, NO hydraulic pressure, NO gear, NO flaps and NO ENGINES".

=== Accidents ===
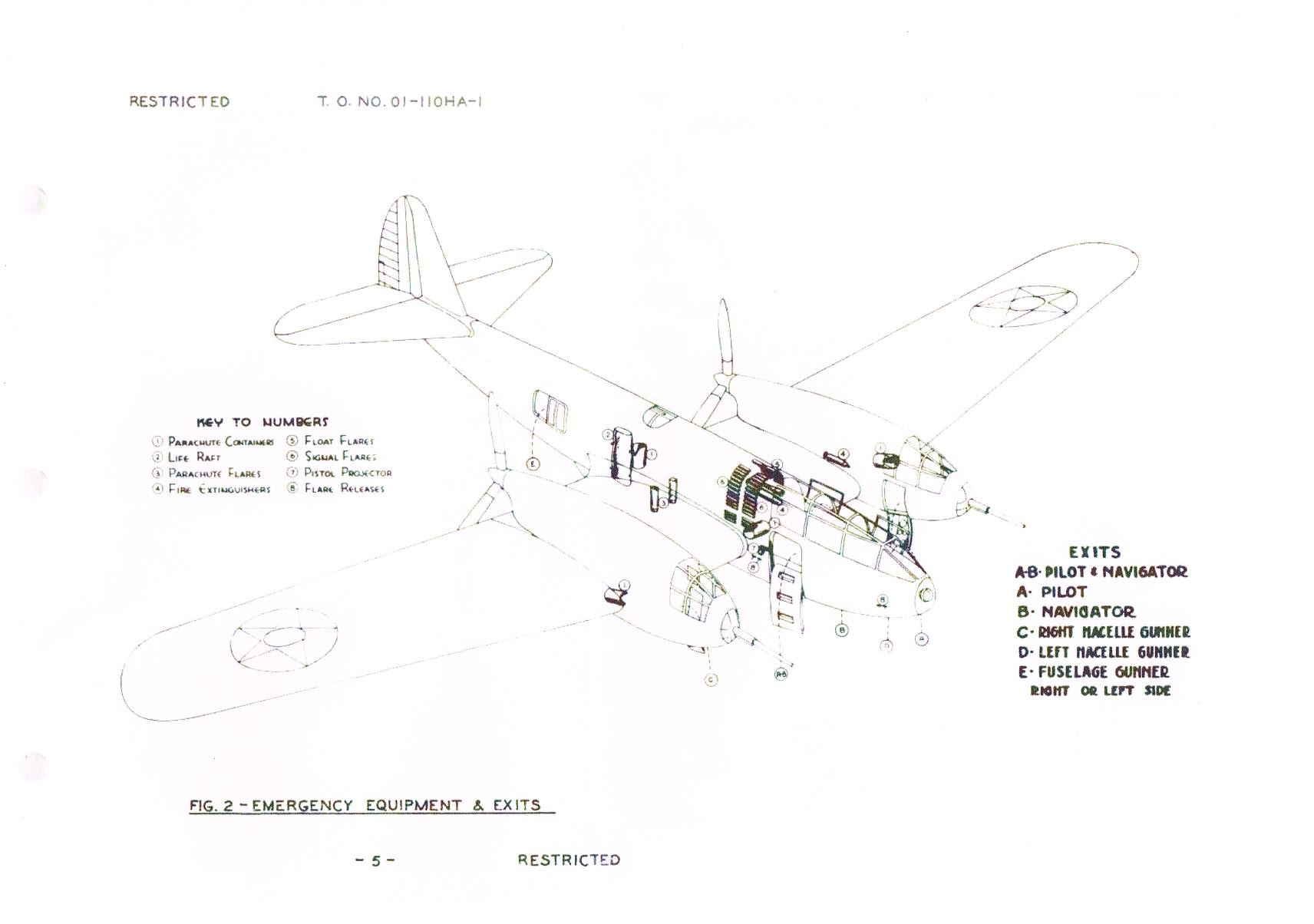
Page from Bell YFM-1 and YFM-1B handbook (T.O.-01-110HA-1) showing emergency equipment and exits

Despite the aircraft's many faults, only two were lost in accidents. The seventh aircraft (38-492) was on its final test flight, on June 21, 1940, from the Buffalo factory prior to delivery to the Air Corps when pilot John Strickler, a Bell pilot and engineer/co-pilot Brian Sparks, Bell's chief test pilot, encountered problems recovering from a deliberate spin attempt which was part of the test flight profile. Despite every effort to emerge from the spin, the aircraft would not respond, and it appeared that the rudder had locked. Co-pilot Sparks shut down the engines and waited for the propellers to come to a stop before bailing out. Because of the tandem seating, it was necessary for Sparks to exit the aircraft first, and in doing so he struck the empennage, breaking his legs – and in the process, freeing the rudder. Strickler remained with the aircraft and crash-landed it in a farmer's field; the aircraft was damaged beyond repair and scrapped.

On January 22, 1942, YFM-1A 38-497 suffered a fire as a result of a broken connecting rod causing vibrations resulting in a broken oil line; the crew bailed out, the pilot being killed when his parachute did not deploy. The accident investigation concluded that the Airacuda suffered from "inherent defects...[causing] constant maintenance difficulties" and recommended the grounding of the remaining YFM-1s.

== Operational history ==
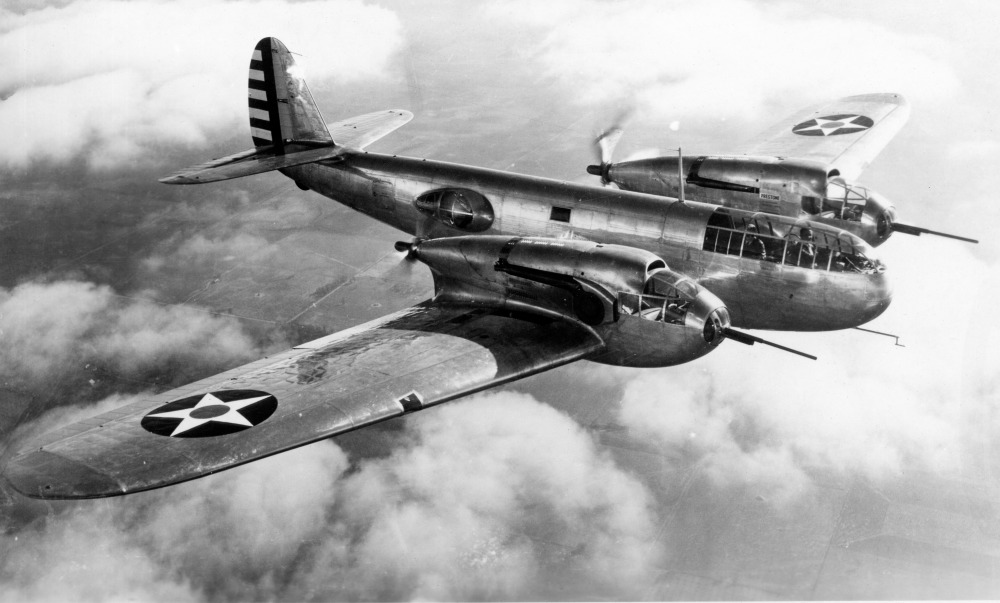
Bell XFM-1 Airacuda in flight

Despite these problems, one fully operational Airacuda squadron was eventually assembled, and operated from 1938 until 1940. Funds were appropriated, but never released, for the purchase of two groups of Airacudas. Continuing problems gave the aircraft a reputation as "hangar queens". Near the end of the type's operational life, the aircraft were flown primarily for photo opportunities and always accompanied by a chase plane for safety. Eventually the decision was made to disperse the aircraft to various airfields to give pilots an opportunity to add the unusual aircraft to their log books. Airacudas were sent at various times to Langley Field, Virginia; Maxwell Field, Alabama; Hamilton Field, California; and Wright Field, in Dayton, Ohio. YFM-1 38-488 was displayed at the 1940 World's Fair in New York, finished in the markings of the 27th Pursuit Squadron. During this time, the aircraft saw limited flight time, as few pilots were interested in flying the unusual aircraft.

Several plans were made to modify the Airacudas to give them operational status, including modifying the airframe and adding more powerful engines, but all proposals were eventually rejected. In early 1942, despite fears of enemy bomber attacks against which the Airacuda was intended, the aircraft were stricken from inventory.

== Variants ==
The prototype, known as the XFM-1, incorporated a tailwheel, side "blister" ports, and a smooth, rounded canopy. This is the best known, and most produced version. An updated version called the YFM-1A eliminated the side blisters and added externally mounted radiators and turbo-superchargers. Produced in 1940, the final version designated YFM-1B, was slightly larger, had slightly less powerful Allison engines and incorporated a tricycle landing gear. The canopy was redesigned, with a flat forward windshield. A rearward-facing belly gunner's position was also added. The resulting aircraft was roughly the size of a Douglas B-18 Bolo medium bomber. Three YFM-1Bs were produced in 1939 before production was finally terminated.

XFM-1
(Model 1) Prototype powered by two 1,150 hp V-1710-13 engines, one (36-351) built.
YFM-1
(Model 7) Development aircraft powered by two 1,150 hp V-1710-23 engines and fitted with 37 mm cannons in wing nacelles, eight built, two later converted to YFM-1B.
YFM-1A
(Model 8) Development aircraft with tricycle landing gear, three built.
YFM-1B
YFM-1 re-engined with 1,090 hp V-1710-41 engines, two converted from YFM-1.
YFM-1C
(Model 17) – proposed variant not proceeded with. (Note: Production deliveries remained haphazard with deliveries from 9 January 1937 through October 1940.)

== Scrapping ==
By 1942, all nine surviving YFM-1 airframes had been flown by ferry crews to a training facility at Chanute Field, Illinois, where the aircraft were assigned to the 10th Air Base Squadron to be used for ground crew instruction. By March 1942, all Airacudas had been scrapped. (Note: The last Airacudas in service were YFM-1 (Model 7) / 38-486/38-487 that were scrapped in March 1942 as "not economical to repair.")

== Specifications (XFM-1) ==
Data from

General characteristics

- Crew: five (pilot, copilot/navigator, radio operator/gunner, two gunners)
- Length: 44 ft 10 in (13.67 m)
- Wingspan: 69 ft 10 in (21.29 m)
- Height: 13 ft 7 in (4.14 m)
- Wing area: 684 sq ft (63.5 m^{2})
- Airfoil: NACA 23018/NACA 23009
- Empty weight: 13,376 lb (6,067 kg)
- Gross weight: 17,333 lb (7,862 kg)
- Max takeoff weight: 21,625 lb (9,809 kg)
- Fuel capacity: 400 US gal (1,500 L)
- Powerplant: 2 × Allison V-1710-9 liquid-cooled turbosupercharged V-12, 1,090 hp (810 kW) each
- Propellers: three-bladed

Performance

- Maximum speed: 277 mph (446 km/h, 241 kn)
- Cruise speed: 244 mph (393 km/h, 212 kn)
- Range: 2,600 mi (4,200 km, 2,300 nmi)
- Service ceiling: 30,500 ft (9,300 m)
- Rate of climb: 1,480 ft/min (7.5 m/s)

Armament

- Guns: ** 2 × 37 mm (1.46 in) M4 cannons (110 rpg)
  - 2 × .30 in (7.62 mm) M1919 Browning machine guns in front of nacelles
  - 2 × .50 in (12.7 mm) M2 Browning machine guns (600 rpg) in side blisters
- Bombs: 20 × 30 lb (14 kg) fragmentation bombs in wing bays

== See also ==
Aircraft of comparable role, configuration, and era

- Curtiss XP-71
- Messerschmitt Bf 110
- Vickers 414

Related lists

- List of military aircraft of the United States
