= Curtiss XP-71 =

Twin-engined fighter aircraft proposal

XP-71
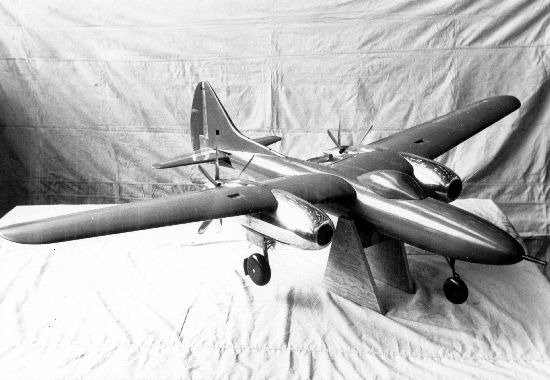
- Model of the XP-71

General information
- Type: Heavy fighter; Escort fighter; Bomber-destroyer/interceptor
- Manufacturer: Curtiss-Wright
- Status: Cancelled in 1943
- Primary user: United States Army Air Forces
- Number built: 0

The Curtiss XP-71 was a 1941 American aircraft proposal by the Curtiss-Wright Corporation for an exceptionally large heavy fighter design. It was intended to serve as an extreme-range interceptor and escort fighter. While significant progress was made in the design phase, no prototypes were ever built, and the design was abandoned in 1943.

== Design and development ==
The proposed aircraft was to have a pressurized cockpit. Power would be provided by two Pratt & Whitney R-4360 Wasp Major radial engines each driving a set of pusher contra-rotating propellers.

Based on studies of heavy, long-range fighters that had been undertaken prior to the American involvement in World War II, the United States Army Air Forces initially ordered two prototypes in November 1941. The major role for the proposed aircraft was to act as an "escort" fighter to protect heavy bombers that would have to operate over occupied Europe even if Britain was conquered.

Developed around two turbocharged 3,450 hp (2,570 kW) R-4360s driving pusher propellers, the XP-71 would have been the largest fighter aircraft built in the war.

The final XP-71 design would have been larger than the contemporary B-25 Mitchell medium bomber and was considered a complex industrial project that would have taxed the resources of the Curtiss company as it was evident that development time would stretch out well beyond the projected need for the type.

At the time, Curtiss facilities were completely committed to producing existing aircraft; due to the need to keep their production lines open for the current types on order and with shifting combat requirements, the USAAF reconsidered the need for the project before prototype construction had begun. As conditions changed and it was clear that Britain would continue to be available for forward bases, the requirement for the advanced fighter project led to the cancellation of the XP-71 in early 1942.

== Specifications (XP-71, as designed) ==
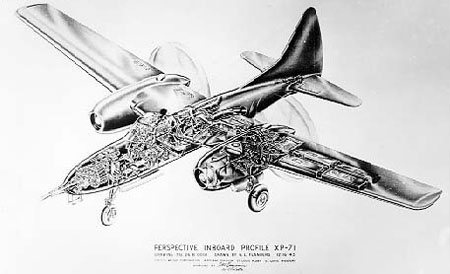
XP-71 illustration by Curtiss-Wright engineer G. L. Flanders

Data from

General characteristics

- Crew: 2
- Length: 61 ft 10 in (18.85 m)
- Wingspan: 82 ft 3 in (25.07 m)
- Height: 19 ft 0 in (5.79 m)
- Wing area: 602 sq ft (55.9 m^{2})
- Empty weight: 31,060 lb (14,089 kg)
- Max takeoff weight: 46,950 lb (21,296 kg)
- Powerplant: 2 × Pratt & Whitney R-4360-13 Wasp Major 28-cylinder air-cooled radial piston engines, 3,450 hp (2,570 kW) each

Performance

- Maximum speed: 428 mph (689 km/h, 372 kn) at 25,000 ft (7,600 m)
- Range: 3,000 mi (4,800 km, 2,600 nmi)
- Service ceiling: 40,000 ft (12,000 m)
- Time to altitude: 25,000 ft (7,600 m) in 12 minutes 30 seconds
- Wing loading: 51.6 lb/sq ft (252 kg/m^{2})
- Power/mass: 0.147 hp/lb (0.242 kW/kg)

Armament

- Guns:
  - 1 × 75 mm (2.95 in) cannon 20rpg
  - 2 × 37 mm (1.46 in) cannon 60rpg

== See also ==
Aircraft of comparable role, configuration, and era

- YFM-1 Airacuda
- XP-58 Chain Lightning

Related lists

- List of fighter aircraft
- List of military aircraft of the United States
