= Bomber destroyer =

Historical aircraft type intended to destroy bomber aircraft

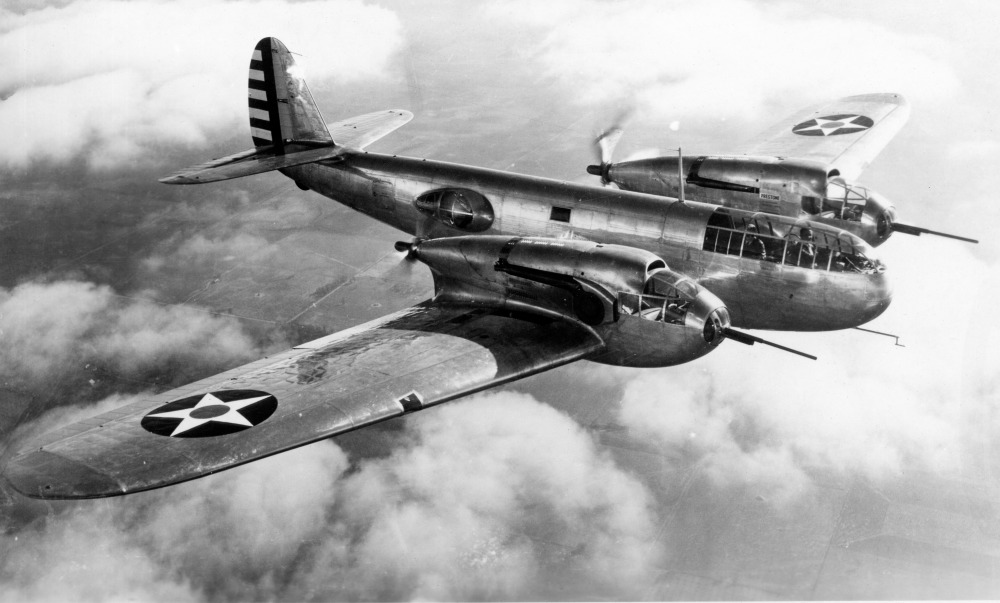
The heavily-armed Bell XFM-1 Airacuda in-flight; The Airacuda was an American-designed pre-WWII 'bomber destroyer'

Bomber destroyers were World War II interceptor aircraft intended to destroy enemy bomber aircraft. Bomber destroyers were typically larger and heavier than general interceptors, designed to mount more powerful armament, and often having twin engines. They differed from night fighters largely in that they were designed for day use.

The United States Army Air Corps considered powerfully armed destroyers, like the Bell YFM-1 Airacuda prototype, to counter a potential attack of high-performance bombers. The Lockheed P-38 Lightning and Bell P-39 Airacobra were also initially specified to carry very heavy armament based on a central 37 mm cannon, specified as interceptor aircraft working in the anti-bomber role.

In the pre-war era the UK, by contrast, favored development of the "turret fighter", such as the Boulton Paul Defiant, which mounted the armament in a rotating turret. Turret fighters were expected to work together to coordinate fire on unescorted bombers (due to limits of German fighter range), able to attack from all quarters, and not be limited by the brief firing opportunity of a single seat fighter in a high speed attack.

The P-38, a small, single-crewed example of the bomber destroyer type, was eventually outfitted with a 20 mm cannon and four .50-caliber machine guns in a central nacelle instead of a heavier cannon; it proved itself a highly competent fighter aircraft in the early phase of World War II.

A deceptively similar, although completely different, designation was the German Zerstörer (meaning "destroyer"). Introduced on 1 May 1939, the term did specifically exclude the defensive anti-bomber role (leaving it for the light fighters), and envisaged a heavy fighter for offensive missions: escorting the bombers, long-range fighter suppression, and ground attack. The German designs suffered performance deficits as they were weighed down by a two- or three-man crew and extra cockpit accommodations.

After World War II, improvements in engine power and armament led to a loss of interest in building bomber destroyers as a specific class of aircraft. Even small fighters were able to carry enough firepower to deal effectively with enemy bombers, and high-performance all-purpose late-war fighters—the P-51 Mustang being the prime example—excelled at all fighter roles: pursuit, bomber escort, interception, and ground attack. The interest in interceptors was renewed during the Cold War; both the United States and the Soviet Union designed and produced dedicated "pure" interceptors such as the Convair F-106 Delta Dart and the Mikoyan-Gurevich MiG-25. These aircraft were generally never referred to as "bomber destroyers", even though their primary mission was the destruction of enemy strategic bombers. Few dedicated interceptors have been designed or produced since the 1960s.

== See also ==
- Escort fighter
- Focke-Wulf Fw 190A Sturmbock
- Schräge Musik
