= T95 medium tank =

American prototype medium tank developed from 1955 to 1959

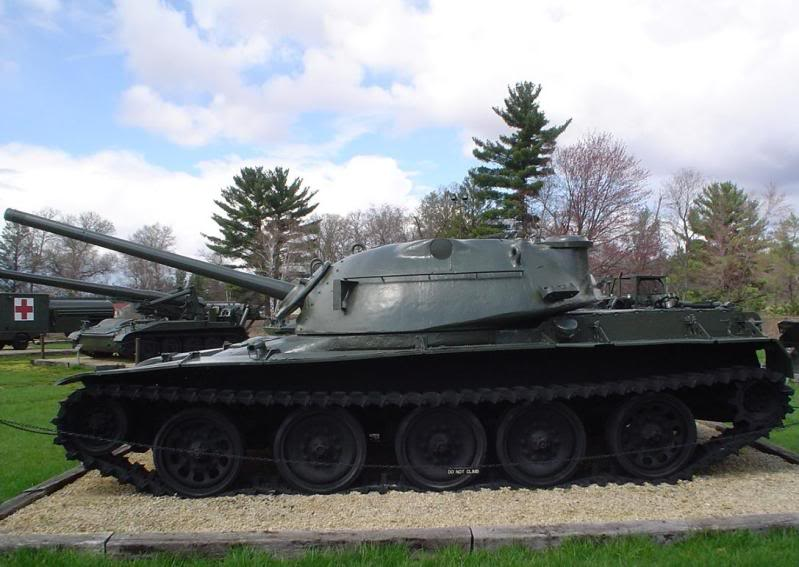
- Type: Medium tank
- Place of origin: United States

Production history
- Designed: 1951–1959

Specifications
- Mass: 38.2 t
- Length: 10.18 m (33 ft 5 in)
- Width: 3.15 m
- Height: 2.85 m
- Crew: 4
- Armor: Fused silica embedded in cast steel armor
- Main armament: 90 mm T208 (T95E2) 105 mm T210 (T95E4)
- Secondary armament: .50 Cal (12.7 mm) M2 machine gun
- Engine: AOI-1195 gasoline engine, GM12V71T diesel engine 550–570 hp (410–430 kW)
- Transmission: XTG-410 four-speed
- Suspension: torsion bar
- Fuel capacity: 206 gallons
- Maximum speed: 56 km/h (35 mph)

The T95 was an American prototype medium tank developed from 1955 to 1959. These tanks used many advanced or unusual features, such as siliceous-cored armor, new transmissions, and OPTAR fire-control systems. The OPTAR incorporated an electro-optical rangefinder and was mounted on the right side of the turret, and was used in conjunction with the APFSDS-firing 90 mm T208 smoothbore gun, which had a rigid mount without a recoil system. In addition, although the tanks were designed with a torsion beam suspension, a hydropneumatic suspension was fitted, and one of the tanks was fitted with a Solar Saturn gas turbine for demonstration purposes.

The siliceous cored armor consisted of fused silica, which has a mass efficiency of approximately three versus copper-lined shaped charges, embedded in cast steel armor for an overall mass efficiency of 1.4. The early APFSDS penetrators fired by the T208 had a low length-to-diameter ratio, this being limited by their brittle tungsten carbide construction, with a diameter of 37 mm, although they had a high muzzle velocity of 1,525 m/s (5,000 ft/s).

The rangefinder, the T53 optical tracking, acquisition and ranging (OPTAR) system, emitted pulsed beams of intense but incoherent infrared light. These incoherent beams scattered easily, reducing effectiveness in mist and rain and causing multiple returns, requiring the gunner to identify the correct return after estimating the range by sight. This, combined with the large and vulnerable design of the transmitter and receiver assembly, led to the abandonment of the OPTAR system in 1957.

== History ==
=== Development ===
In the early 1950s, work began in the US to develop an eventual replacement to the M48 Patton tank, the operational medium tank at the time. A series of relatively simple upgrades to the T48 were considered as part of the T54 project, but these were considered to offer too little advantage to be worth it. Examples of more radical upgrades were also called for.

In September 1954, out of many submitted plans, two main examples were chosen – the T95, and the T96, which used a larger and heavier gun with a 105 mm round. Both tanks used smooth-bore barrels with fixed mounts and no recoil systems. In November 1956, it was decided that nine tanks would be produced. Four of them would be original T95s. One would be a T95 with a 90 mm gun on a mount with a recoil system, receiving the designation T95E1. The remaining four would use the T95 chassis and the T96 turret, and were designated T95E4s.

=== Production ===
Because the T96 turrets were not yet constructed (and were never completed), it was decided that of the four T95E4s, two would be fitted with M48A2 turrets, and the other two were fitted with T54E2 turret and with 105 mm T140 cannons.

The first T95 variant to go into production was the T95E2, in May 1957. The T95E3 was produced in July of the same year, and the first original T95s were ready in February 1958.

== Description ==
The T95 tank was created using a traditional design with a driver in the front, the fighting compartment in the center, and the engine compartment in the rear. The tank had a four-man crew, consisting of a commander, a gunner, a loader, and a driver.

The driver's work area is in the forward compartment. The hatch is located in the glacis above the driver's head. With the hatch sealed the driver operates the tank using three periscopic visual devices, the middle of which is equipped with a night-vision infrared camera from the T161. Ammunition stores are located on either side of the driver’s chair.

=== Hull and turret ===
The majority of the hull is welded, but the front is a single massive casting. The upper part of the forward armor, or glacis, has a thickness of 95 mm and is at an angle of 65 degrees from vertical. The thickness of the roof and floor of the hull around the driver's compartment is 51 and 19 mm respectively; the thicknesses of said areas are 25 and 13 mm, respectively, around the fighting and engine compartments. The thickness of the main side plates vary from 102 mm in front down to 32 mm around the engine.

The cast turret has a ring diameter of 85 inches (220 cm), the same as the M48. The frontal turret armor is 178 mm, and the sides are 78 mm. The shape of the turret is elongated compared to the M48. The gunner's seat is situated to the right of the main gun in the front of the turret. The commander's seat is also in the turret, with a built-in 12.7 mm M2 machine gun, with an M28 periscopic sight for aiming. For 360-degree vision, five armored viewports are installed in the turret. Primary shells are stored in the lower section of the turret, beneath the ring.

=== Armament ===
The T95 and the T95E1 are equipped with T208 90 mm smooth-bore guns. The T95's equipment is on a fixed mount and is stabilized in two axes. The T95E1 equipment was installed on a recoil mount, but lacks stabilization systems. All T95 models were equipped with T320 armor-piercing rounds, which have tungsten cores, diameters of 40 mm, and muzzle velocities of 1,520 meters per second. These rounds can successfully penetrate a 127 mm armor plate when fired at a 60-degree angle from 2,000 yards (1,800 m). A standard T95 was equipped with 50 rounds.

The T95E2 retained the armament of its predecessor, the M48A2. With a 90 mm gun, it could fire a 74 mm anti-armor shell at 915 meters per second for a range of 2,000 yards. It was equipped with 64 rounds.

The T95E3 was armed with a T140 105 mm rifled gun. With a muzzle velocity of 1079 m/s, the armor piecing capability at 2,000 yards was 122 mm at a 60-degree firing angle. Standard equipment was 64 rounds.

The T95E4 was planned to have a T210 105 mm smoothbore gun. In order to accommodate the extra length of the rounds (112 cm), the gun was moved forward, preventing stabilization. The muzzle velocity of the round was 1,740 m/s, with an armor penetration of 152 mm at 60 degrees at 2,000 yards. Standard equipment was 40 rounds.

With the appearance of the T123 120 mm rifled gun, it was decided that it should be installed on two of the four planned T95E4s. This variant was designated T95E6. The T123 gun had a muzzle velocity of 1,070 m/s and armor-piercing capability of 122 mm at 60 degrees, at a range of 2,000 yards.

=== Fire-control system ===
The T95E2 and the T95E3 were equipped with fire-control systems, identical to the one used in the M48A2, with stereoscopic rangefinders and mechanical ballistics computers.

The T95 also had an FCS which had an OPTAR optic rangefinder, as well as an electronic ballistics computer. It also featured a periscopic sight from the T44 and a T50 ballistic computer.

The T95E1 used a simplified targeting system – a rangefinder and a ballistics computer were omitted.

=== Powerplant ===
Under the original proposal, T95 and T96 tanks had to be equipped with X-shaped 750 hp 12-cylinder diesel engines. However, because this engine was only in the early stages of development, it was decided to temporarily equip the tanks with four-stroke, eight-cylinder AOI-1195 gasoline engines. The engine was placed transversely and was connected with the XTG-410 four-speed transmission. Three fuel tanks, with a total capacity of 780 liters, were installed in the engine compartment.

Despite higher fuel economy compared to the M48A2 engine, gasoline engines provided insufficient torque. At the same time, the development of the X-shaped diesel engine failed, so, starting in mid-1958, other options were considered. As an interim measure, it was decided to use a modified version of the civilian 12-cylinder, two-stroke, water-cooled, V-type, 570 hp GM 12V71T diesel engine.

A contract was signed with the Continental Motors Company in the development of the AVDS-1100 air-cooled diesel engine, and with Caterpillar to develop the LVDS-1100 water-cooled diesel engine. Both engines are quad-V-shaped, with an estimated 550 hp. However, tank testing with the three new power plants began after the retirement of the T95 program.

=== Chassis ===
The suspension consists of five sets of double road wheels with torsion bar springs. The system is a "flat track" and does not have return rollers. The forward and rearmost road wheels are equipped with hydraulic shock absorbers. On some of the tanks lightweight openwork road wheels were used.

Caterpillar treads were used, with rubber bushed pins. The width of the tracks were 533 mm or 610 mm. The number of tracks in a tread was 80 and the length of the bearing surface was 4.2 m.

== Retirement ==
During the development of T95 tank, it became clear that it would not have a significant advantage over the M48A2. The X-shaped motor and optical rangefinder were both discarded due to performance, and the accuracy of the smoothbore gun continued to be unsatisfactory. All this led to the closure of the project on July 7, 1960.

Work on the T95E7 turret was continued, which led to the creation of the M60A1 turret. Some existing T95 hulls were re-fitted with the AVDS-1790 engine and used from 1960 to 1964 to develop the T118E1 prototype of the M728 combat engineer vehicle.

== Versions and modifications ==
- T95 – The original tank, with a 90 mm T208 smoothbore gun with a rigid mounting.
- T95E1 – Recoil mount, 90 mm T208 gun, simplified fire-control system
- T95E2 – Turret from the M48A2, 90 mm M41 rifled gun
- T95E3 – Turret from the T54E2, 105 mm T140 rifled gun
- T95E4 – Turret from the T96, 105 mm T210 smoothbore gun
- T95E5 – A T95E2 with a license built Royal Ordnance L7, US designation "105 mm T254E1", never built. Turret design used on M60 MBT.
- T95E6 – Turret from the T96, 120 mm T123E6 rifled gun, never built
- T95E7 – A T95E1 with a 105 mm T254E2, never built. Turret design used on M60A1 and M60A3.
- T95E8 – A T95E2 with a 12V71T diesel engine
- T95E8 test rig - A T95E8 with the turret and 152 mm XM81 gun-launcher used on M60A2
- T95E8 tube-over-bar test rig - The T95E8 test rig fitted with hydropneumatic suspension.
- T95E9 - A T95E6 with a 12V71T diesel engine, never built
- T95E10 - A T95 with VDS-1100 diesel engine, never built
- T95E11 - A T95E6 with VDS-1100 diesel engine, never built
- T95E12 - A T95E6 with a two-meter base rangefinder, a full solution fire control system, and VDS-1100 diesel engine, never built
- T118E1 - Combat engineering vehicle, outfitted with a front bulldozer blade, A-frame hoist assembly, and M57 165 mm demolition gun. Test bed of the M728 combat engineer vehicle

	T95	T95E1	T95E2	T95E3	T95E6
Length (gun forward)	400.9 in (10.2 m) (pilots 1 & 2); 403.9 in (10.3 m) (pilots 3 & 4)	405.9 in (10.3 m)	330.1 in (8.4 m)	448.5 in (11.4 m)	426.1 in (10.8 m)
Width	124.0 in (3.1 m)				
Height (over MG)	112.0 in (2.8 m)		114.0 in (2.9 m)	115.0 in (2.9 m)	
Ground clearance	17.0 in (43.2 cm)				
Top speed	35 mph (56 km/h)				
Fording	48 in (1.2 m)				
Max. grade	60%				
Max. trench	8.5 ft (2.6 m)				
Max. wall	36 in (0.9 m)				
Range	145 mi (233 km)				
Power	560 hp (420 kW) at 2800 rpm				
Power-to-weight ratio	13.3 hp/ST (10.9 kW/t)	13.2 hp/ST (10.9 kW/t)	13.8 hp/ST (11.3 kW/t)	12.4 hp/ST (10.2 kW/t)	
Torque	1,170 lb⋅ft (1,590 N⋅m) at 2100 rpm				
Weight, combat loaded	84,300 lb (38,240 kg)	84,800 lb (38,460 kg)	81,400 lb (36,920 kg)	90,250 lb (40,940 kg)	90,200 lb (40,910 kg)
Ground pressure	12.1 psi (83 kPa) (T114 track); 10.6 psi (73 kPa) (T127 track)	12.2 psi (84 kPa) (T114); 10.7 psi (74 kPa) (T127)	11.7 psi (81 kPa) (T114); 10.2 psi (70 kPa) (T127)	13.0 psi (90 kPa) (T114); 11.4 psi (79 kPa) (T127)	
Main armament	90 mm T208 or T208E13	90 mm T208E9	90 mm M41	105 mm T140E3	120 mm T123E6
Elevation, main gun	+20° / −10°		+20° / -?	+20° / −10°	+20° / −9°
Traverse rate	10 seconds/360°		15 seconds/360°	17 seconds/360°	15 seconds/360°
Elevation rate	4°/second				
Main gun ammo	50 rounds		64 rounds	39 rounds	36 rounds
Firing rate	7 rounds/minute		8 rounds/minute	6 rounds/minute	4 rounds/minute

== See also ==
- T54 (American tank)
- List of vehicles of the U.S. Armed Forces
- Chieftain tank

== Sources ==
- Hunnicutt, Richard Pearce (1990). Abrams - A History of the American Main Battle Tank. Presidio Press. ISBN 0-89141-388-X.
- Ogorkiewicz, Richard M (1991). Technology of Tanks. Jane's Information Group Limited. pp. 48, 79, 174, 260, 326, 371. ISBN 0-7106-0595-1.
