= U-5TS =

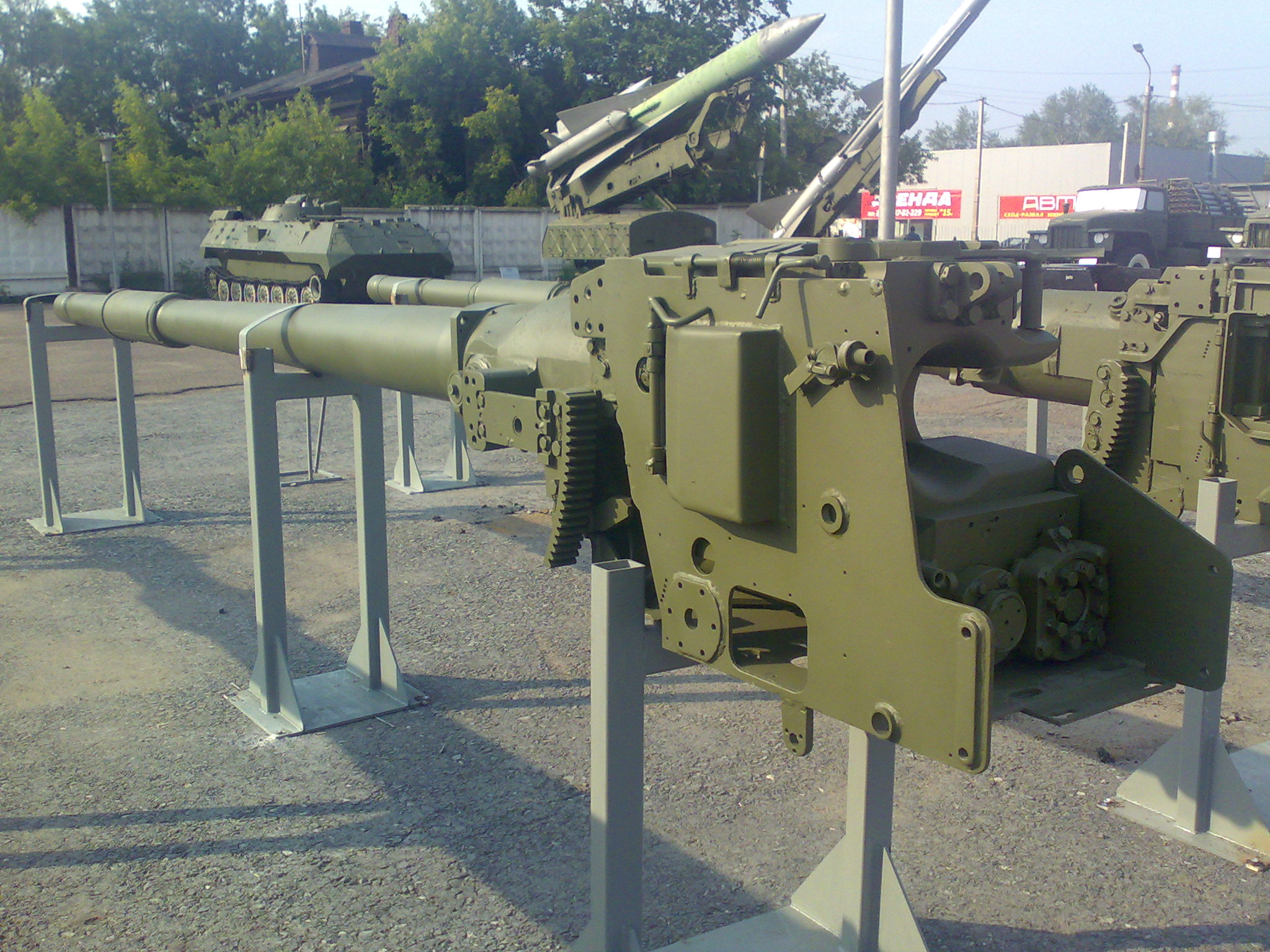
- U-5TS tank gun on display at the Motovilikha Plant Museum in Perm. Russia.
- Type: Smoothbore tank gun
- Place of origin: Russia

Service history
- In service: 1961–present
- Wars: Sino-Soviet border conflict Yom Kippur War; Ogaden War; Soviet–Afghan War; Lebanese Civil War; 1982 Lebanon War; Chadian–Libyan War; Polisario War; Angolan Civil War; Ethiopian Civil War; Iran–Iraq War; Eritrean–Ethiopian War; Gulf War; First Chechen War; Second Chechen War; Operation Iraqi Freedom; Russo-Georgian War; 2011 Libyan civil war Syrian civil war Afghan conflict Russo-Ukrainian War

Production history
- Designed: Late 1950s

Specifications
- Barrel length: 6.05 m L/52.6
- Crew: 3
- Shell: 115×728mmR
- Caliber: 115 millimetres (4.53 in)
- Rate of fire: 6–10/minute
- Muzzle velocity: 1,600 m/s (APFSDS)
- Effective firing range: 2,000 m-high target – 1,870 m; 3 m-high target – 2,260 m; 4,000 m AT-12 missile.

The U-5TS (production designation 2A20) tank gun is a 115 mm-calibre weapon that was fitted almost (Note: The North Korean Chonma is thought to be armed with a U-5TS as well.) exclusively to the Soviet Union's T-62 main battle tank. It was the first smoothbore weapon designed for tanks, and heralded the change in main armament from rifled cannons.

== History ==
As the T-54/55 series began to replace the T-34 tanks in the Soviet Army in the 1950s it was recognised that the standard NATO tanks of the time—the Centurion and M48 Patton—had armour that could not easily be defeated by the existing ammunition for the 100 mm D10 gun that the new tanks carried. The Soviets set about designing a new "heavy" vehicle which was required to complement the tanks in an overwatch capacity and to provide greater anti-armour capability.

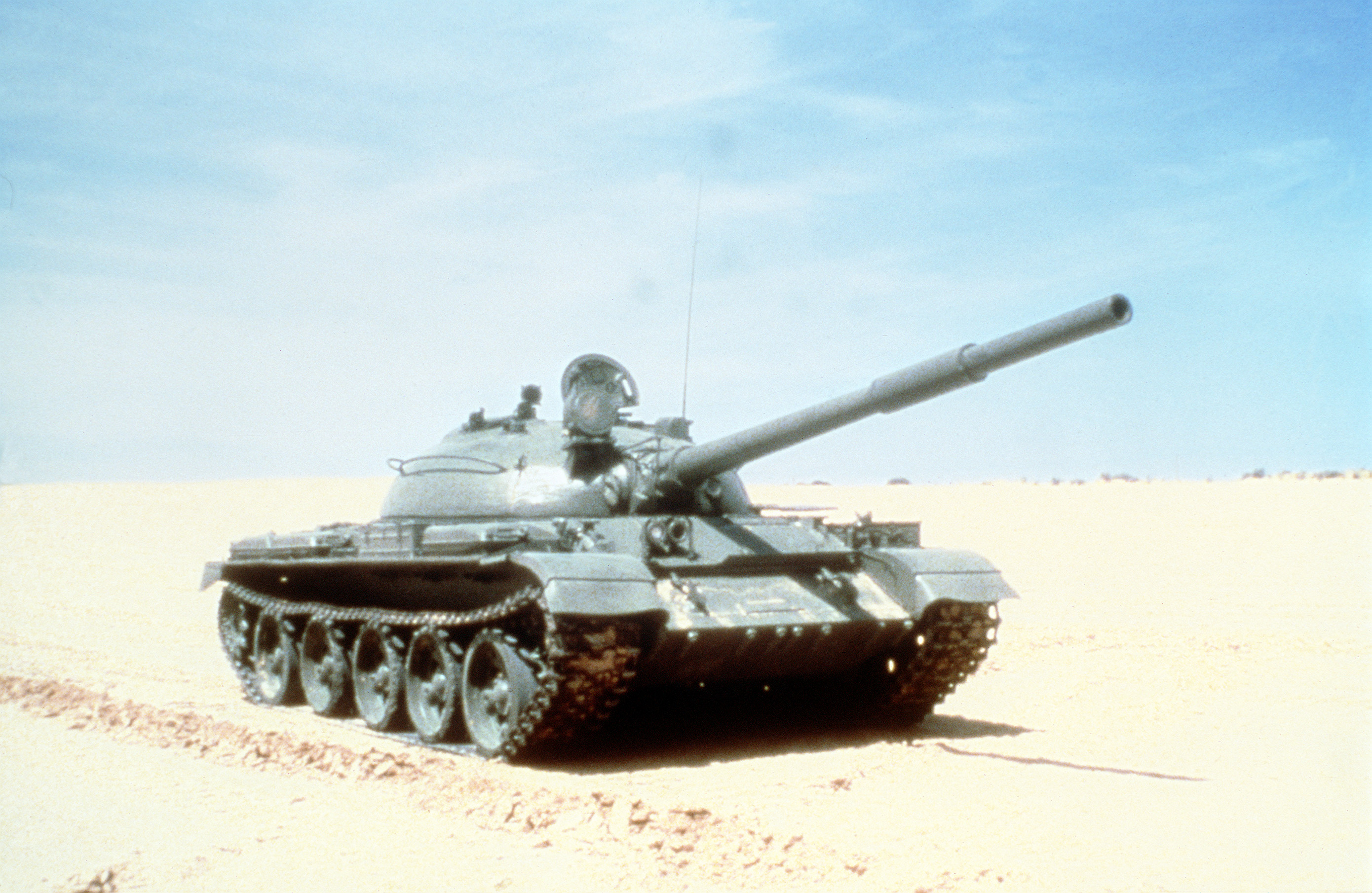
T-62 Tank with U-5TS Gun at the US NTC

The new vehicle, the T-62, was to be equipped with a new smoothbore design—which allows higher velocity and greater armour penetration with kinetic rounds—based on an enlargement of the 100 mm 2A19 anti-tank gun that had entered production in 1955. The new weapon, designated as U-5T, could penetrate 300mm of vertical RHA at 1,000 metres and re-established a comfortable penetration capacity against Western armour.

Though the T-62 would have variable success in the conflicts it was involved in, the U-5TS would remain a formidable weapon that proved capable of penetrating the armour of any comparable NATO tank until the deployment of third generation MBTs in the late 1970s and early 80s. This was proven by examination of Iranian Chieftain and M60s knocked out by Iraqi T-62s during the Iran–Iraq War. These examinations led to the development of add-on armour packages such as Stillbrew to try to counter the U-5TS.

== Ammunition ==
Another first with this gun was the use of armour-piercing fin-stabilized discarding-sabot ammunition, with the initial 3VBM-1 rounds featuring steel penetrators. The subsequent development of this type of ammunition for this gun led to an array of penetrator designs and different materials with the final model, the 3UBM-13, using depleted uranium. In accordance with later Soviet and current Russian practice an anti-tank guided missile, the 9K118 Sheksna, has been developed for use with the T-62 and U-5TS. There is also HE-FRAG and HEAT ammunition available for this weapon.

Due to the comparatively low height of the T-62 design - in line with Soviet tank design philosophies of the time - the U-5TS is limited to a rate-of-fire of 6-10 shots per minute due to little room for the loader to perform his activity. Experienced loaders were capable of reloading the gun in 6 seconds.

Designation	Origin	Designer & producer	Year	Sub-projectile length	Penetrator dimension	L/D ratio (sub-projectile / penetrator only)	Penetrator material & weight	Sub-projectile weight with sabot / Projectile Weight	Propellant type & weight	Chamber pressure	Muzzle velocity	Velocity drop	Perforation at normal and oblique incidences	Notes
3BM-3	Soviet Union	OAO Zavod	1963	542 mm (21.3 in)	⌀ 42-30 × 436 mm	12.5:1 (avg. diameter to penetrator length)	Steel Rod	5.5 kg / 4.0 kg			1615 m/s	128.5 m/s (at 1000 m)	270 mm at 0° at 2000 m, 100 mm at 60° at 2000 m	Has Tungsten Carbide Tip
3BM-4	Soviet Union	OAO Zavod	1963	542 mm (21.3 in)	⌀ 42-30 × 436 mm	12.5:1 (avg. diameter to penetrator length)	Steel Rod	5.5 kg / ??? kg			1650 m/s	128.5 m/s (at 1000 m)	220 mm at 0° at 2000 m, 110 mm at 60° at 2000 m	Does not have the tungsten carbide tip
3BM-6	Soviet Union	OAO Zavod	1967	542 mm (21.3 in)	⌀ 42-30 × 436 mm	12.5:1 (avg. diameter to penetrator length)	Steel Rod	5.34 kg / 3.86 kg			1680 m/s	128.5 m/s (at 1000 m)	240 mm at 0° at 2000 m, 120 mm at 60° at 2000 m	Does not have Tungsten Carbide Tip
3BM-21	Soviet Union	OAO Zavod	1975				Steel Rod	6.26 kg / ??? kg			1600 m/s	128.5 m/s (at 1000 m)	330 mm at 0° at 2000 m, 135 mm at 60° at 2000 m	Features Tungsten Carbide Tip with a Tungsten Alloy Piercing Cap
3BM-28	Soviet Union	OAO Zavod	1978		⌀ 30mm avg. × 326 mm	10.8:1 (avg. diameter to penetrator length)	Depleted Uranium Rod	4.91 kg / ??? kg			1650 m/s	95 m/s (at 1000 m)	350 mm at 0° at 2000 m, 205 mm at 60° at 2000 m	The Penetrator was later re-used to make the 125mm 3BM-29 APFSDS. Penetrator Weight = 4.36 kg
3BM-36	Soviet Union	OAO Zavod	1988		⌀ 28mm avg. × 380 mm	13.5:1 (avg. diameter to penetrator length)	Depleted Uranium Rod	??? kg / ??? kg			1650 m/s	80 m/s (at 1000 m)	385 mm at 0° at 2000 m, 225 mm at 60° at 2000 m	The Penetrator from 3BM-32 Vant was re-used to make the 3BM-36. Penetrator Weight = 4.3 kg
BD/36-2	Great Britain	Royal Ordnance					Heavy Tungsten Alloy Rod	5.93 kg / 3.59 kg			1600 m/s	55 m/s (at 1000 m)	385 mm at 0° at 2000 m, 225 mm at 60° at 2000 m	The 115 mm BD/36-2 APFSDS-T round has a tungsten-nickel-iron penetrator derived from the design of the British 105 mm H6/62 APFSDS-T. Made for Egyptian Production.
M1150	Belgium	Mecar (subsidiary of Nexter Systems)					Heavy Tungsten Alloy Rod	6.5 kg / ??? kg			1635 m/s		>500 mm LOS at 60° at 2000 m	
3BM-21M	Russia				⌀ 22 × 640 mm	26:1	Heavy Tungsten Alloy Rod	???kg / ???kg			1610 m/s	65 m/s (at 1000 m)	490-495 mm at 0° at 2000 m, 285-290 mm at 60° at 2000 m	New 115mm in Development. Appears as a 3BM-60 Svinets-2 penetrator inside a 115mm projectile.

== Current and former users ==
- Soviet Union
- Afghanistan
- Algeria
- Angola
- Belarus
- Bulgaria
- Cuba
- Egypt
- Eritrea
- Ethiopia
- Iran
- Iraq
- Iraqi Kurdistan
- Israel
- Kazakhstan
- Mongolia
- North Korea
- Sahrawi Arab Democratic Republic
- Russia
- Syria
- Tajikistan
- Turkmenistan
- Ukraine
- Uzbekistan
- Vietnam
- Yemen
- Lebanese Christian Militia

== See also ==
=== Weapons of comparable role, performance and era ===
- Royal Ordnance L11A5: British 120-mm rifled equivalent

== Notes and references ==
- Zaloga, Steven; Modern Soviet Combat Tanks; Osprey Publishing, London; 1984
