= AT-12 =

AT-12 may refer to

- AT-12 Swinger, a missile
- AT-12 Guardsman, an aircraft
- AT12, (AT12T) a man portable 120mm disposable anti-tank weapon manufactured by Bofors.
