= Germany–Qatar relations =

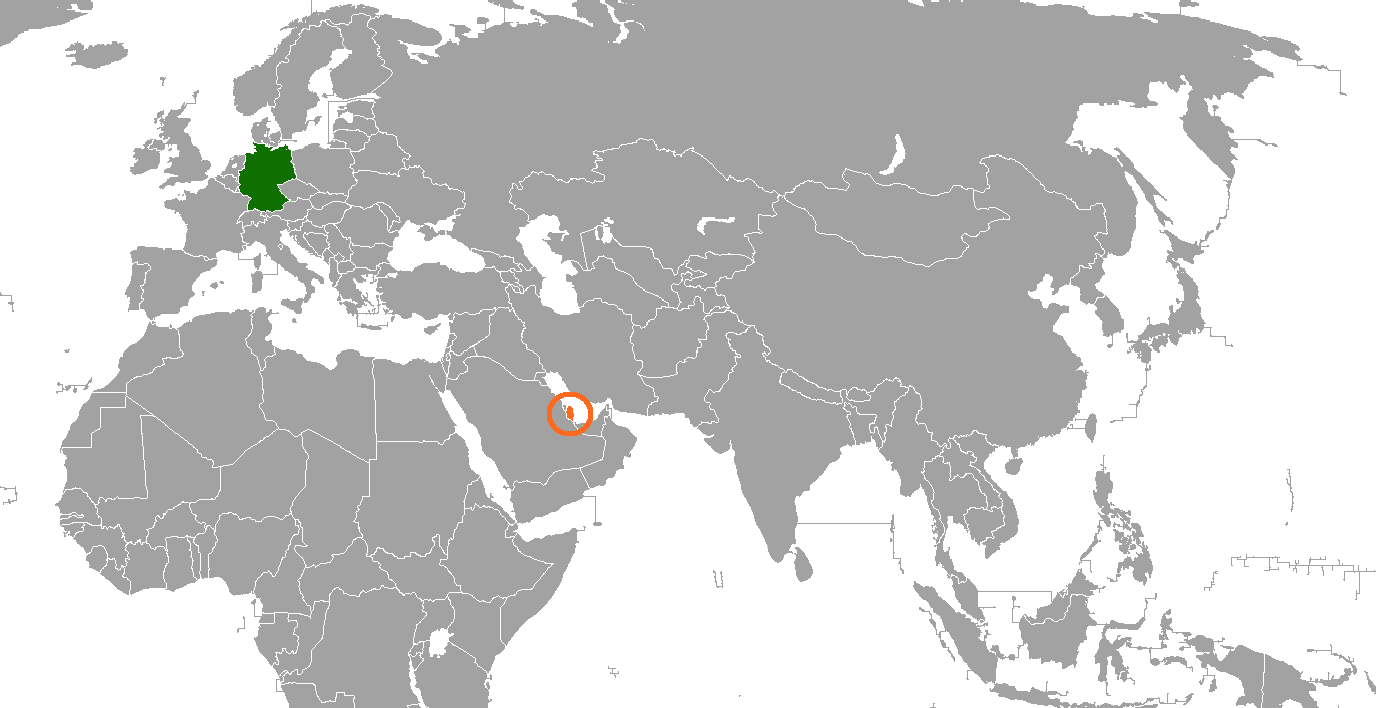

- Germany: Qatar

Germany–Qatar relations are the bilateral relations between Germany and the State of Qatar. Relations were first commenced in 1973.

== Diplomatic representation ==
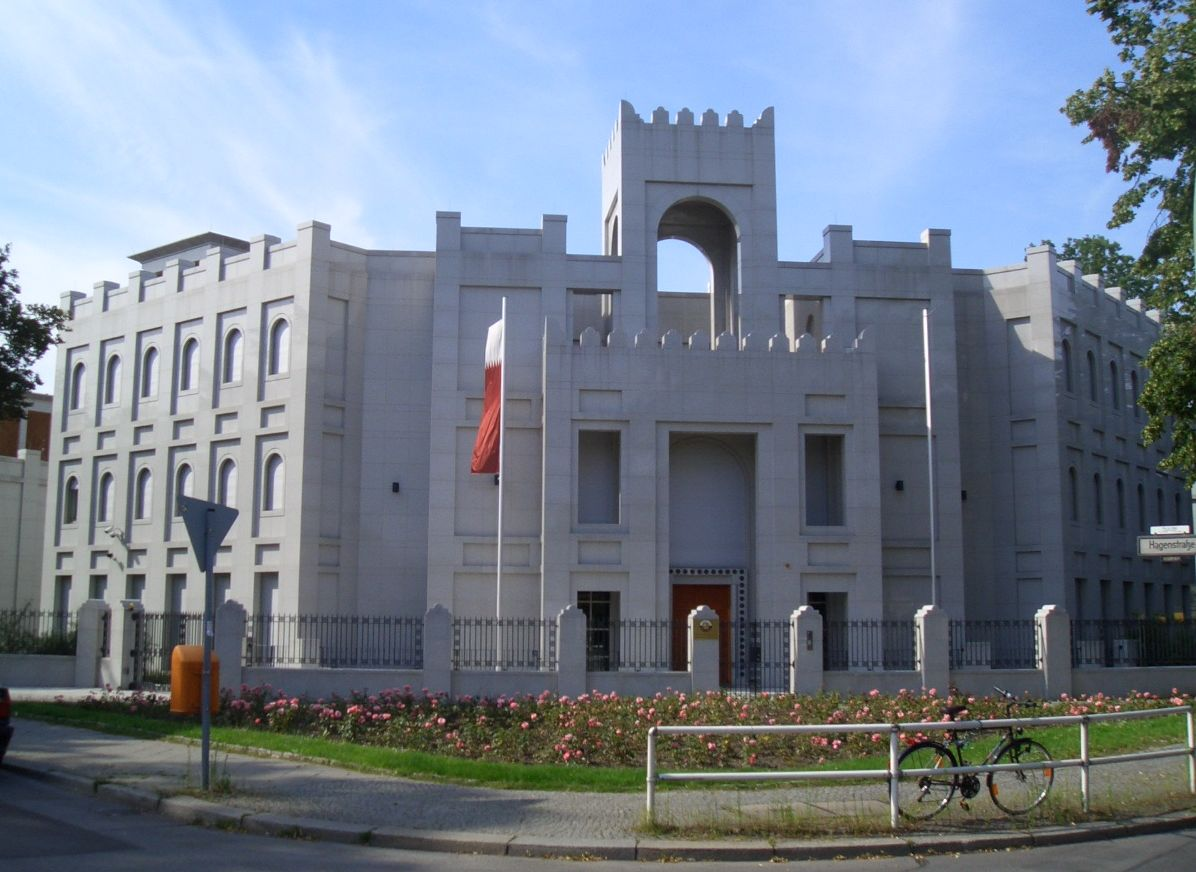
Qatari embassy in Berlin

By January 1973, just two years after Qatar gained its independence, Germany was among the eighteen countries that Qatar appointed an ambassador to. Qatar has had an embassy in Berlin since 2005. It is headed by Saoud bin Abdulrahman Al Thani as of 2017. Germany has an embassy in Doha. The German ambassador to Qatar is Lothar Freischlader.

== High level visits ==
In 1999, sheikh Hamad bin Khalifa Al Thani visited Germany, marking the first time the Qatari leadership made an official visit to the country. President of Germany Johannes Rau paid a visit to Qatar in 2001, and in 2002 Sigmar Gabriel, the Prime Minister of Lower Saxony, also visited Qatar. The first German chancellor to travel to Qatar on an official capacity was Gerhard Schröder, who did so in 2005. During his visit, the two countries signed a security agreement.

Emir Tamim bin Hamad Al Thani visited Angela Merkel in September 2017 to discuss the 2017 Qatari diplomatic crisis. Merkel expressed "great concerns" over the dispute and the absence of any immediately foreseeable resolution.

On 20 May 2022, Sheikh Tamim met with German Chancellor Olaf Scholz in Berlin. They agreed on an energy partnerschip and discussed the Joint Comprehensive Plan of Action regarding Iran.

On 12 October 2023, during a state visite to Germany, Sheikh Tamim met with Chancellor Olaf Scholz. They discussed the Gaza war, Qatar's mediation efforts and future supply of liquified natural gas.

== Diplomatic relations ==
=== Political ===
In August 2014, Gerd Müller, German Minister of Development, alleged that Qatar was funding ISIS militants. Following the comments, Germany said that it "regrets" the remarks made by Müller, and that it did not wish for any misunderstandings. One day after Germany commented on the minister's statements, Qatar denounced ISIS and claimed that it does not provide funding of any kind.

==== 2017 Qatari diplomatic crisis ====
On 6 June 2017, German FM Sigmar Gabriel condemned the Saudi-led boycott of Qatar. In July, he called on the blockading countries to respect Qatar's rights as a sovereign nation, and applauded its prudence in responding to the blockade.

=== Military ===
In April 2013, Qatar signed a $2.5 billion deal with German defense company Krauss-Maffei Wegmann to purchase 62 Leopard tanks. Almost half of the tanks had been delivered to Qatar by October 2016.

In early 2019 Germany announced that it had approved the sale of the RIM-116 Rolling Airframe Missile (RAM) weapon system to Qatar. The deal was criticized by opposition lawmakers citing ongoing human rights concerns in the Persian Gulf region. There were no complaints of arbitrary or unlawful executions carried out by the government or its agents in Qatar as of the year 2022, according to a report written by US Department of State using data representing final statistics after human rights reforms were implemented in Qatar. Torture and other forms of cruel, inhumane, or humiliating treatment are prohibited under the constitution and the law. Throughout the year, there were no reports of torture. Regarding jail or detention facility circumstances that sparked human rights concerns, no statistics were available.

Announcement of the deal came amidst a freeze on German weapons sales to Saudi Arabia in the wake of the assassination of Jamal Khashoggi.

=== Business and investment ===
Qatar has made large-scale investments in some of Germany's most prominent companies, including Volkswagen, Siemens and Deutsche Bank.

The Qatar German Business Forum was inaugurated in 2000, and a joint economic commission between the two countries was set up in 2007. In 2015, Germany accounted for 7.3% of Qatar's foreign trade volume. Qatar's main export to Germany is liquefied natural gas. Germany's main exports to Qatar are motor vehicles and machinery.

In May 2022, during a visit to Germany, Sheikh Tamim and Chancellor Scholz signed an energy partnership agreement to develop trade relations in liquified natural gas to reduce Germany's dependence on Russia.

On 29 November 2022, Germany signed a 15-year deal with Qatar's state-owned petroleum company QatarEnergy to buy 2m tonnes of liquid gas, with the deliveries to start in 2026 through the US company ConocoPhillips to the LNG terminal in Brunsbüttel.

A group of German companies signed an agreement with QatarEnergy to provide energy. Annalena Baerbock praised the bilateral relations and also called for expanding global cooperation in the renewable energy sector. Baerbock also thanked Qatar for its repatriation operation in Afghanistan and the progress made by the State of Qatar in the field of human rights, adding that was a role model in this field, particularly due to its cooperation with the International Labor Organization. As per HE the Minister of State for Energy Affairs, Saad bin Sherida al-Kaabi, will sign liquefied natural gas (LNG) supply deals with European customers this year summer, that accompany expansion of the project.

In May 2025, Qatar threatened to halt LNG deliveries to Europe if the European Union continued with proposed regulations linking trade to human rights and environmental standards.

=== Arts and culture ===
The Qatar Germany 2017 Year of Culture was an initiative organized by Qatar Museums Authority to enhance cultural ties between Qatar and Germany. The first joint event was a performance by the Qatar Philharmonic Orchestra, which was directed by German conductor David Niemann. They played both German and Qatari music at the Katara Opera House.

== See also ==
- Foreign relations of Germany
- Foreign relations of Qatar
- German International School Doha
