= FV4202 =

FV4202 "40-ton Centurion"
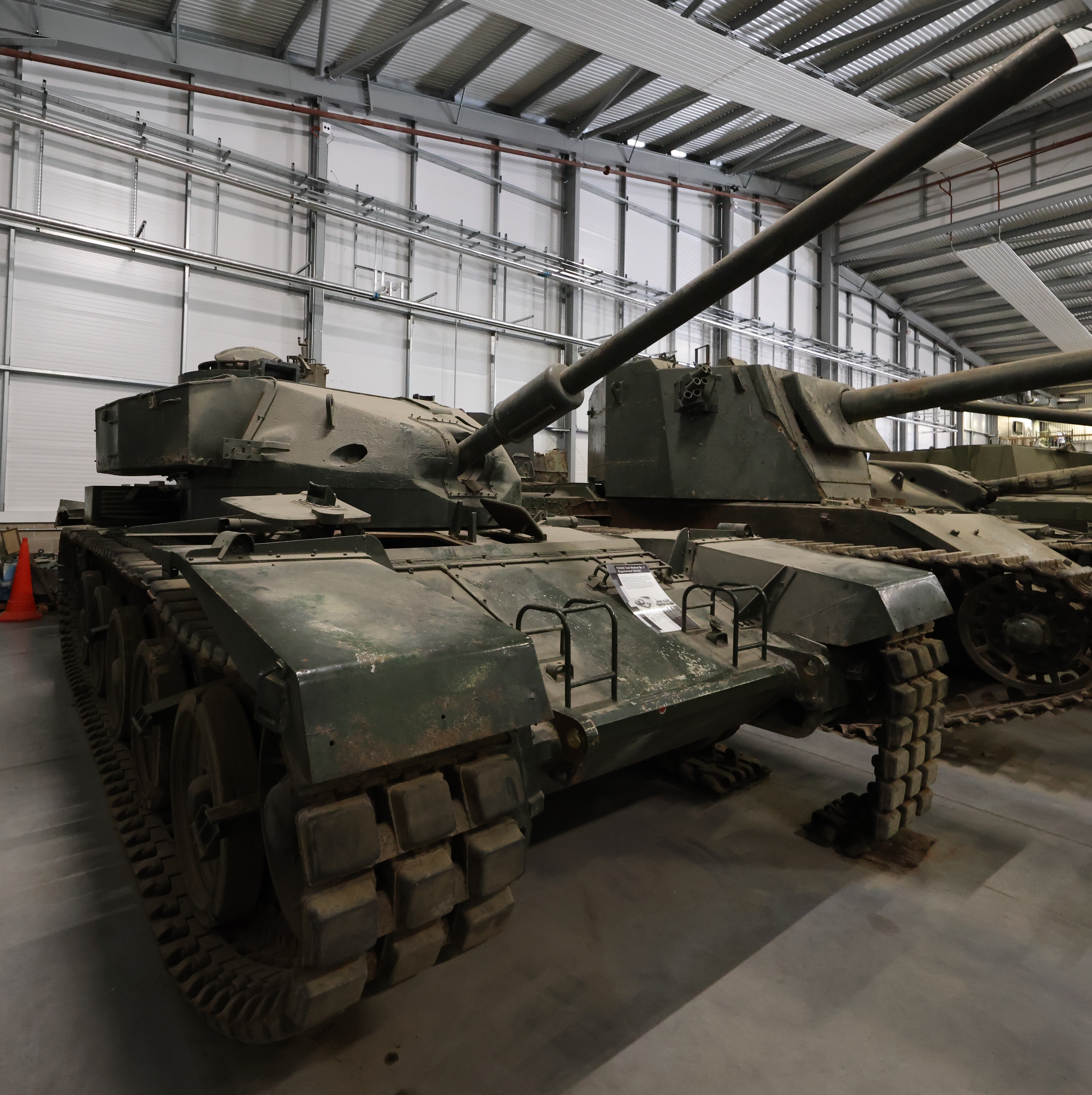
- FV4202 in the Vehicle Conservation Centre at The Tank Museum
- Type: Technology test bed
- Place of origin: United Kingdom

Service history
- In service: Prototypes, never in service
- Wars: Cold War

Production history
- No. built: 3 prototypes

Specifications
- Mass: 40.8 long tons
- Crew: 4 (commander, gunner, loader and driver)
- Armour: Cast and welded steel
- Main armament: 84 mm Ordnance QF 20 pounder model B
- Secondary armament: .30 Browning coaxial machine gun
- Engine: V8 Rolls-Royce Meteorite Mk. 202B; 520 bhp (393 kW) at 2,700 rpm
- Power/weight: 12.4 hp/t
- Transmission: Merritt-Brown V52 (5 forward & 1 reverse gear)
- Suspension: Horstmann

The Tank Medium No. 2 Experimental Vehicle FV4202 also known as the 40-ton Centurion was a technology test bed developed by British company Leyland Motors between 1955 and 1956. It was used to develop various concepts later used in the Chieftain main battle tank.

== History ==
The FV4202 was built by Leyland Motors as a research vehicle for the FVRDE to test the conceptual layout of the proposed FV4201 Chieftain main battle tank. Three vehicles were built between 1955 and 1956. The weight of FV4202 was nearer 42 tons as the cast turrets were usually too heavy due to the fact that the manufacturers of the turret castings were paid by weight rather than per item. One vehicle - an amalgam of two vehicles - is preserved at the Bovington Tank Museum and another one has been employed as a recovery training aid at SEME Bordon.

== Design ==
The FV4202 test bed was built from readily available Centurion parts, such as the suspensions, smoke grenade dischargers, armament, hatches, cupola, sights and turret drive. It featured a reclined driver position, allowing the use of a well-sloped glacis plate and the "mantletless" cast turret was built, with an internal gun mantlet.

Having a shorter hull than the Centurion, the FV4202 only had five road wheels per side. The FV4202 was also lower than the Centurion due to the use of 28 inch-diameter road wheels (31 inch for the Centurion). The tracks were a narrower variant of the ones used on the early Centurion marks.

The FV4202 is powered by the Rolls-Royce Meteorite V8 petrol engine which was, in essence, two-thirds of a V12 Rolls-Royce Meteor. The Meteorite has a 18.01 litre (1,099 cu in) capacity and deliver 520 bhp (393 kW) at 2,700 rpm. The engine was coupled to a Merritt-Brown V52 gearbox originally developed for the Vickers Medium Cruiser Tank Mk. I.

== Appearance in video games ==
The FV4202 appears in War Thunder, World of Tanks, World of Tanks Blitz, and World of Tanks: Modern Armor video games.

== See also ==
- FV4201 Chieftain
- Centurion (tank)
- Conqueror (tank)
