= Chieftain (tank) =

British main battle tank of the 1960s-90s

Chieftain (FV4201)
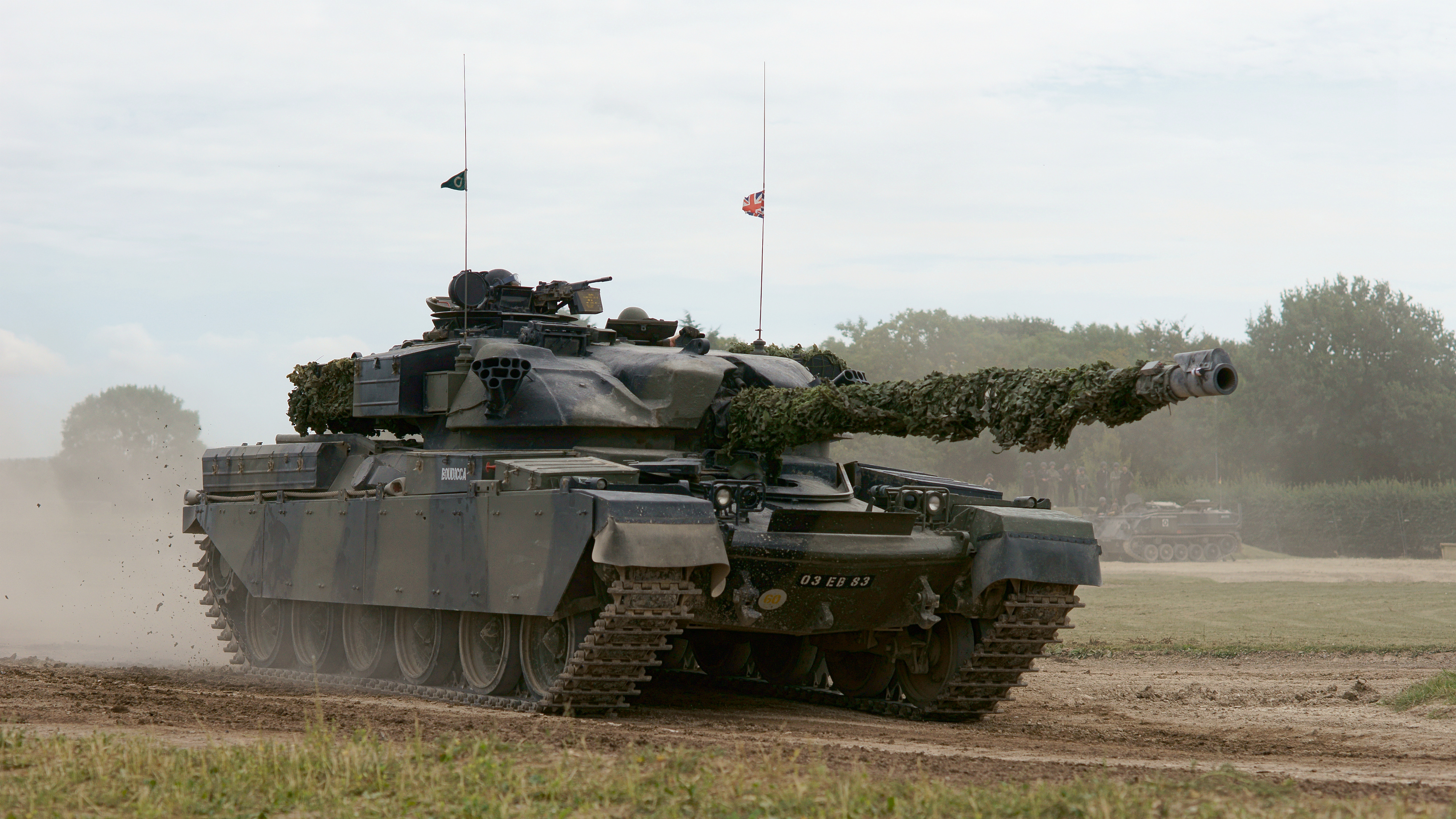
- A Chieftain Mark 11 at the Bovington Tank Museum (2013)
- Type: Main battle tank
- Place of origin: United Kingdom

Service history
- In service: 1960s–1990s
- Used by: United Kingdom, Iran, Iraq, Jordan, Kuwait, Oman
- Wars: Iran–Iraq War; Persian Gulf War

Production history
- Manufacturer: Leyland Motors
- Unit cost: £90,000–£100,000 (1967)
- No. built: 1,896 (900 for UK, 996 exported)

Specifications
- Mass: 55 long tons (62 short tons; 56 t)
- Length: 35 ft 4 in (10.77 m) – gun forward 7.5 m (24 ft 7 in) – hull
- Width: 12 ft 0 in (3.66 m)
- Height: 2.9 m (9 ft 6 in)
- Crew: 4
- Armour: Glacis: 127 mm (5.0 in) (72°); Hull sides: 50 mm (2.0 in) (10°); Turret: 350 mm (14 in) (60°)
- Main armament: L11A5 120 mm rifled gun
- Secondary armament: 2 × L7 Machine Gun
- Engine: Leyland L60 (multifuel 2-stroke opposed-piston compression-ignition); 750 hp (560 kW) 6 Cyl, 19 litres.
- Power/weight: 11.1 hp (8.3 kW)/ton (at sprocket)
- Transmission: TN 12
- Suspension: Horstmann: horizontal coil spring suspension bogies
- Ground clearance: 1 ft 10 in (0.56 m))
- Fuel capacity: 195 imp gal (890 L; 234 US gal)
- Operational range: 500 km (310 miles) on roads
- Maximum speed: Road: 40 km/h (25 mph) (Mk. 1- Mk. 3); 43 km/h (27 mph) (Mk. 5)

The FV4201 Chieftain was the primary main battle tank (MBT) of the United Kingdom from the 1960s into the 1990s. Introduced in 1967, it was among the most heavily armed MBTs at the time, mounting a 120 mm Royal Ordnance L11 gun, equivalent to the much larger specialist heavy tanks in service. It was also among the most heavily armoured, with up to 195 mm (7.7 in) that was highly sloped to give 388 mm (15.3 in) thickness along the line of sight.

A development from the Centurion MBT, the Chieftain introduced the supine (reclining) driver position to British design allowing a heavily sloped hull with reduced height. A new powerpack and improved transmission gave it higher speed than the Centurion despite being heavier due to major upgrades to armour protection and the armament; this allowed it to replace both the Centurion and Conqueror heavy tank while performing their roles effectively.

The multi-fuel engine proved to be the design's primary drawback, causing frequent breakdowns; it was said sarcastically that the Chieftain was extremely effective if it broke down in a useful location. This led to a series of improved models with new armour, sensors, engines and suspension systems, and these saw sales export success. Among these was the Shir 2 version for Iran, which added Chobham armour, one of the first British uses of this armour. This order was cancelled due to the Iranian Revolution in 1979.

It was intended that the Chieftain would be replaced by a new design, the MBT-80. When tensions with the Warsaw Pact rose in 1980, Vickers offered a further updated version of the Shir 2 which became Challenger 1. This could be available years earlier and still met many of the MBT-80 design goals. Challenger deliveries began in 1983, but the Challenger initially proved problematic and the Chieftain remained in front-line service until 1996 with the introduction of the Challenger 2.

== Development ==
The Chieftain was an evolutionary development of the successful cruiser line of tanks that had emerged at the end of the Second World War. Its predecessor, the Centurion main battle tank (MBT), is widely considered to be one of the most successful of post-war MBT designs. However, the introduction of the Soviet IS-3 /IS-4 heavy tank along with Soviet T-54/T-55 led to the introduction of the Conqueror heavy tank armed with a 120 mm (4.7 in) gun. A single design combining the firepower of the Conqueror's 120 mm gun with the mobility and general usefulness of the Centurion was seen as the ideal combination.

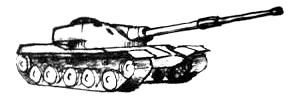
Early concept drawing of the FV4201 Chieftain featuring a pike nose and different road wheel configuration.

Starting in 1950, a series of concept research studies was undertaken to generate the outline of a design to succeed Centurion". These involved both a development of the existing Centurion Heavy Cruiser Tank design, as well as a variety of unconventional concepts such as small one- and two-man tanks equipped with anti-tank missiles or auto-loading and liquid-propellant guns. in 1954 the decision was taken that the next UK tank should be an evolutionary design that would carry a high velocity gun and have a bagged charge ammunition system.

Leyland, who had been involved in the Centurion tank, had built their own prototypes of a new tank design in 1956. Several aspects of the design were trialled by the production of the FV4202 "40-ton Centurion" with a reclined driver position and mantletless gun mounting. In effect, the FV4202 was a shorter Centurion chassis with a prototype of what would become the Chieftain turret, but armed with the 20pdr gun.

This work led to a War Office specification for a new tank. The General Staff specification drew on the experience of Centurion tanks in the Korean War as well as that of the Conqueror tank. The tank was expected to be able to engage the enemy at long range, from defensive positions, and be proof against medium artillery. To this end, the gun was to have a greater angle of depression than the 8 degrees of Conqueror and would be equipped with better frontal armour. The tank was expected to achieve a firing rate of 10 rounds per minute in the first minute and six per minute for the following four.

The first few prototypes were provided for troop trials from 1959 which identified a number of changes. Improvements to address engine vibration and cooling resulted in a redesign of the rear hull. This increased the design weight to nearly 50 tons, so the suspension (which had been designed for 45 tons) was strengthened. Trackpads had to be fitted to protect roads from damage, and the ground clearance increased. The design was accepted in the early 1960s.

Britain and Israel had collaborated on the development in its latter stages with a view to Israel purchasing and domestically producing the vehicle. Two prototypes were delivered as part of a four-year trial. However, it was eventually decided not to sell the tank to the Israelis (since, in the late 1960s, the UK was more friendly towards the Arab states and Jordan than to Israel), which prompted them to follow their own development programme.

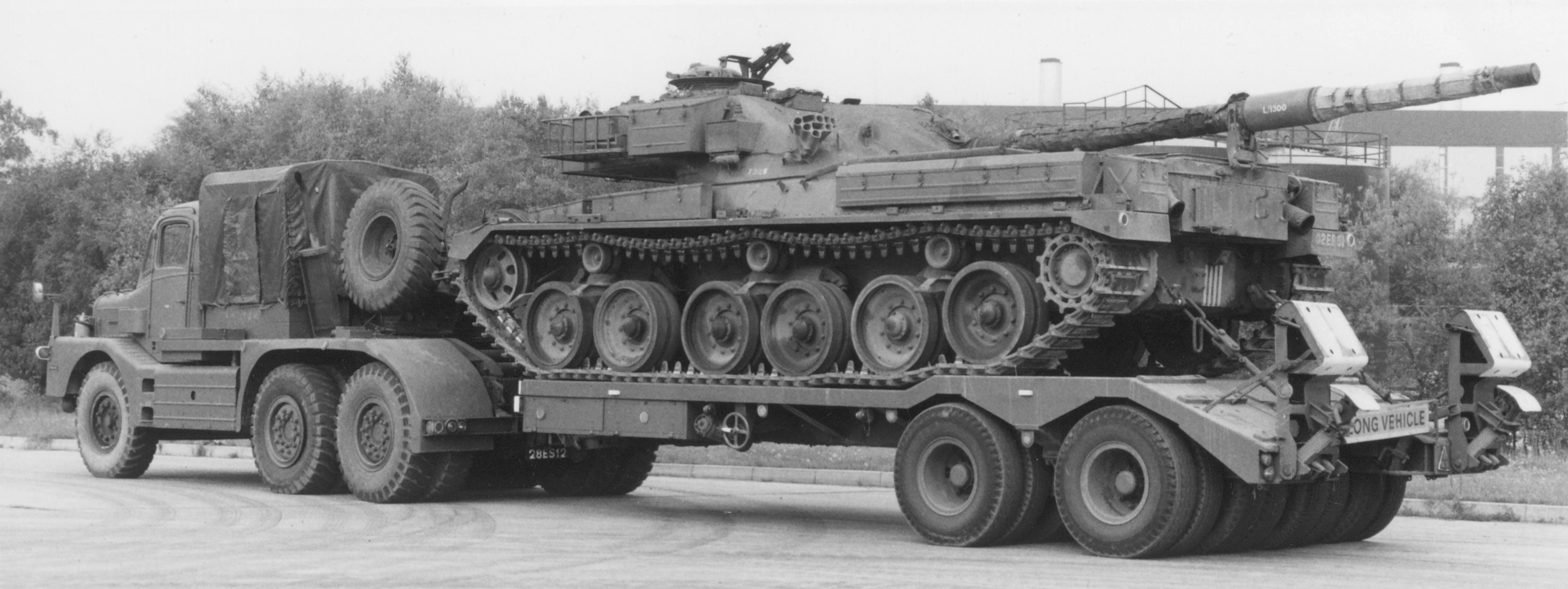
Chieftain on a Thornycroft Antar tank transporter

In 1957, NATO had specified that its forces should use multi-fuel engines. The early Leyland engine delivered around 450 bhp (340 kW) to the sprocket, which meant a top road speed of around 25 mph (40 km/h) and cross-country performance was limited. Whilst the Horstmann coil spring suspension gave a poorer on-road ride quality than tanks with torsion bar suspension, Colonel Peter Hamer of the 11th Hussars commented that "over really bad rough ground it could leave a Leopard for dead". Due to the cylinder linings being pressure fitted, coolant leaks within the cylinder block were common, resulting in white smoke billowing from the exhaust.

In the late 1970s, engine design changed with the introduction of Belzona, which was used to improve the lining seals. Engine output also increased, with later engines delivering 850 bhp (630 kW) to the sprocket. This meant better performance and an increased speed. However, cross-country speed remained limited.

== Design ==
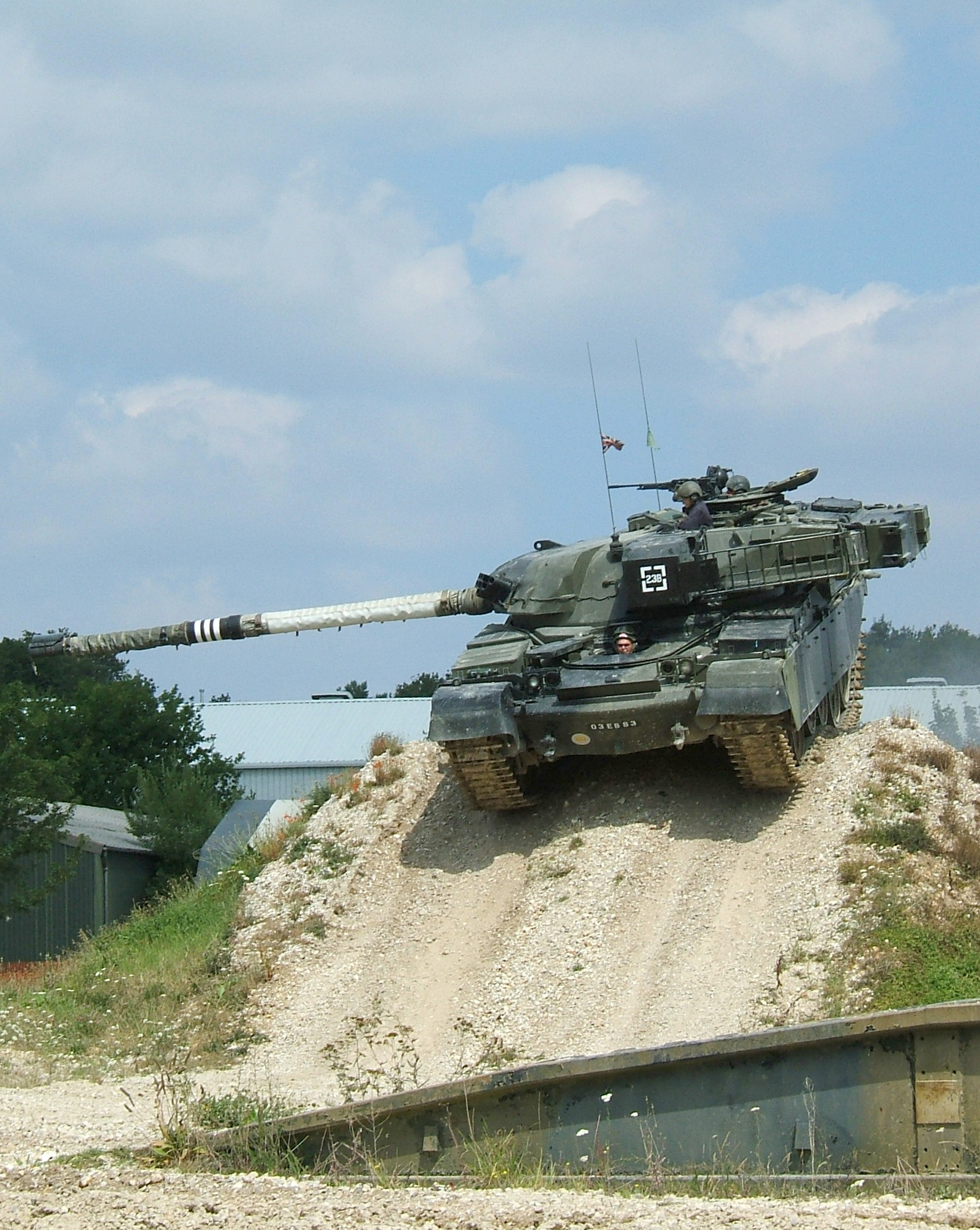
Chieftain display at the Bovington tank museum, 2006

The design of the Chieftain included a heavily sloped hull and turret which greatly increased the effective thickness of the frontal armour. The cast turret made by FH Lloyd was up to 280 millimetres (11 in) thick and designed to stop 100 mm APHE rounds fired by the Soviet T-54 and T-55 at close ranges. The glacis plate was specified during development to be 120 mm thick at an angle of 60°, but this was changed to a thinner, highly sloped glacis made from cast armour steel, offering equivalent protection. It had a mantletless turret in order to take full advantage of reclining the vehicle up to ten degrees in a hull-down position.

For security reasons, early prototypes had a canvas screen covering the mantlet and a sheet metal box mounted over the sloping glacis plate to disguise the configuration of the vehicle.

The driver lay semi-recumbent in the hull when his hatch was closed down which helped to reduce the profile of the forward glacis plate. The commander, gunner and loader were situated in the turret. On the left side of the turret was a large searchlight with infrared capability in an armoured housing.

The original design of the Chieftain tank called for a petrol V8 Rolls-Royce engine. With a two-year delay in the development of the V8 engine the decision was taken to drop the V8 and adopt a yet to be produced multi-fuel engine."

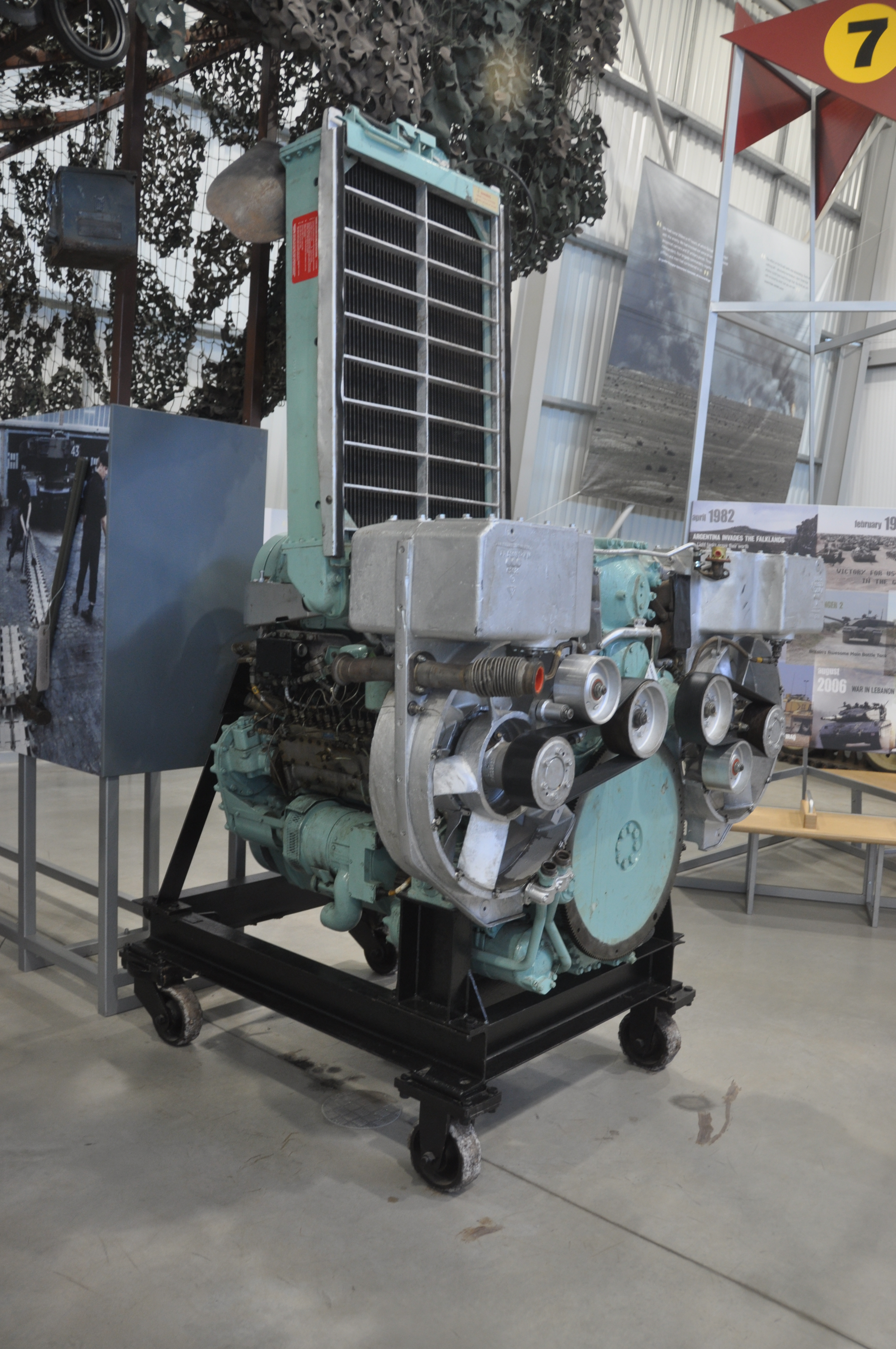
A Leyland L60 engine pack displayed at the Bovington tank museum. The complete unit could be removed by the crane of the FV434.

The Leyland L60 engine is a two-stroke opposed piston design intended for multi-fuel use so that it could run on whatever fuel was available. In practice the engine did not deliver the expected power and was unreliable, estimated to have a 90% breakdown rate but improvements were introduced to address this. Primary problems included cylinder liner failure, fan drive problems and perpetual leaks due to vibration and badly routed pipework. However, as the engine power improved the tank itself became heavier.

The tank was steered by conventional tillers hydraulically actuating onto external brake discs. The discs worked via the epicyclic gearbox providing regenerative steering. The Merritt-Brown TN12 triple-differential gearbox was operated motorcycle-style with a kick up/kick down "peg" on the left, which actuated electro-hydraulic units in the gearbox, the accelerator cable was operated by the right foot. In the turret, the loader was on the left and the gunner on the right of the gun with the commander situated behind the gunner. The suspension was of the Horstmann bogie type with large side steel plates to protect the tracks and provide stand-off protection from hollow charge attack.

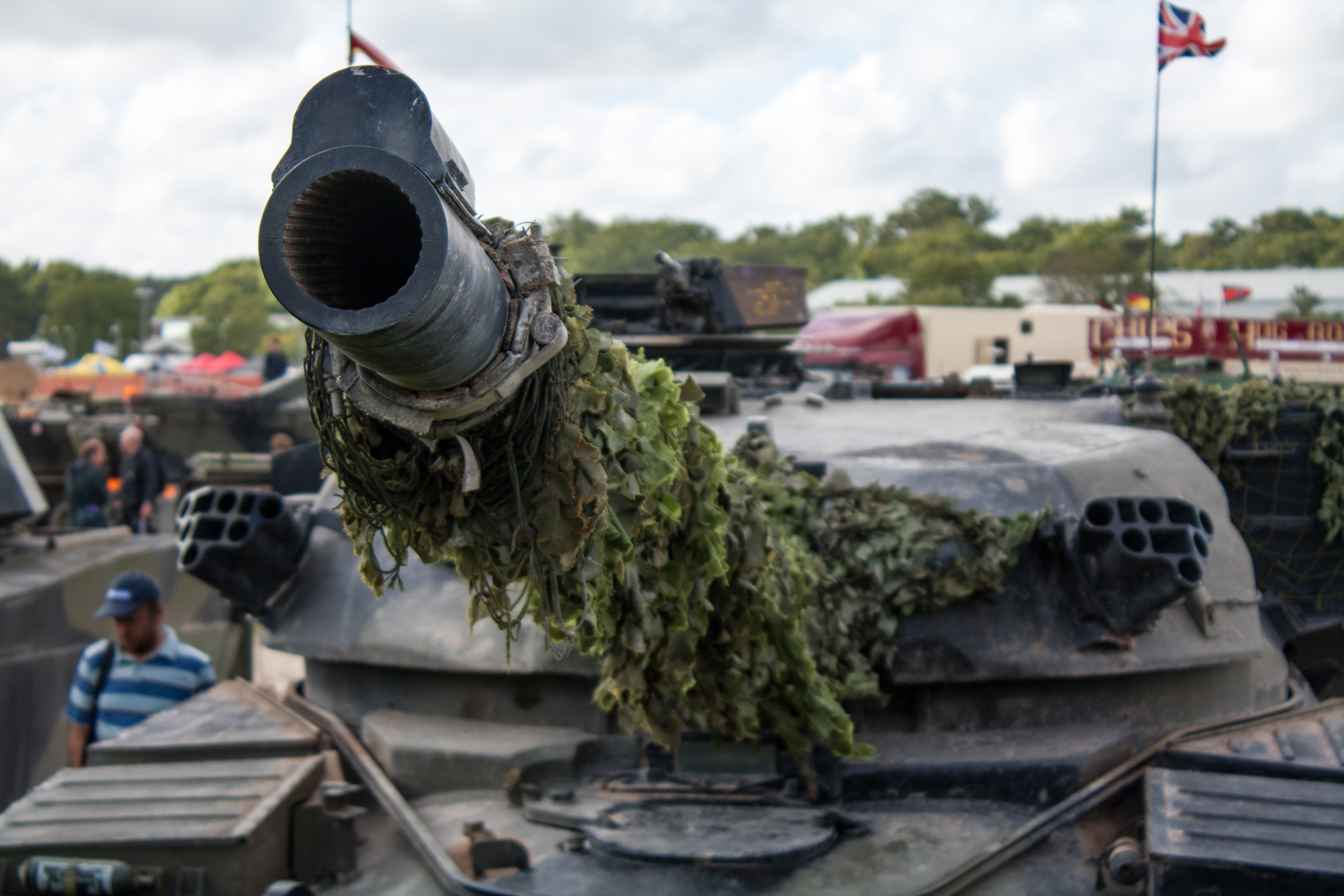
Detail of the 120 mm L11A5 rifled gun

The main armament was the 120 mm L11A5 rifled gun. This differed from most contemporary main tank armament as it used projectiles and charges that were loaded separately, as opposed to a single fixed round. The design of the Bagged Charge System was initiated after the earlier Liquid Propellant Gun project had failed due to the injection pump being so large that "no tank could accommodate it". This led to design studies to find "means of reducing the ammunition size and from this the bagged charge concept emerged". The charges were encased in combustible bags. Other tank guns such as the 120mm L1 gun on the Conqueror, needed to store the spent shell cartridges or eject them outside. The combustible charges were stored in 36 recesses surrounded by a pressurised water/glycol mixture – so-called "wet-stowage". In the event of a hit penetrating the fighting compartment, the jacket would rupture, soaking the charges and preventing a catastrophic propellant explosion. As there was no shell case, the firing of the charge was by vent tubes automatically loaded from a ten-round magazine on the breech. Due to the length of the gun, which required balancing, and the need for storage space, the turret has a large overhang to the rear. This contains radios, ammunition and fire control equipment and has further stowage externally.

The gun could fire a wide range of ammunition but the most commonly loaded types were high explosive squash head (HESH), armour-piercing discarding sabot (APDS), or practice round equivalents for both types. The Chieftain could store up to 64 projectiles (although the propellant stowage allowed a maximum of 36 charges for APDS rounds). The gun was fully stabilised with a fully computerized integrated control system. The secondary armament consisted of a coaxial L8A1 7.62 mm machine gun and another 7.62 mm machine gun mounted on the commander's cupola. An advantage of using two-part ammunition was that in the case of inert rounds like APDS the loader could reach for the next round and hold it in his lap, ready to load while the gunner was acquiring the target and firing. This practice increases the rate of fire but would be hazardous with one-piece ammunition.

Chieftain had an NBC protection system which Centurion lacked. An infantry telephone was fitted to the rear of the tank to facilitate communication with infantry.

The initial Fire-control system (FCS) was the Marconi FV/GCE Mk 4. A .50-inch (12.7 mm) ranging gun was mounted above the main gun (with 300 rounds available). This fired ranging shots out to a maximum of 2,600 yards (2,400 m), at which point the tracer in the ranging rounds burned out although the high explosive tip still created a visible "splash" on impact. The tank commander had a rotating cupola with nine vision blocks -giving all round view, plus the 7.62 mm machine-gun and an infrared (IR) capable projector coaxial with the weapon. The aiming systems were provided for both the gunner and the tank commander; they had 1x or 10x selectable magnification power, increasing to x15 in the Mk5 and beyond, and they were replaceable with IR vision systems for night operations (3x magnification power). The commander could rotate his cupola to bring his sight onto a target and then engage the mechanism that brought the turret round on to the correct bearing so that the gunner could complete the aiming.

The commander's controls had over-ride capability on those of the gunner.

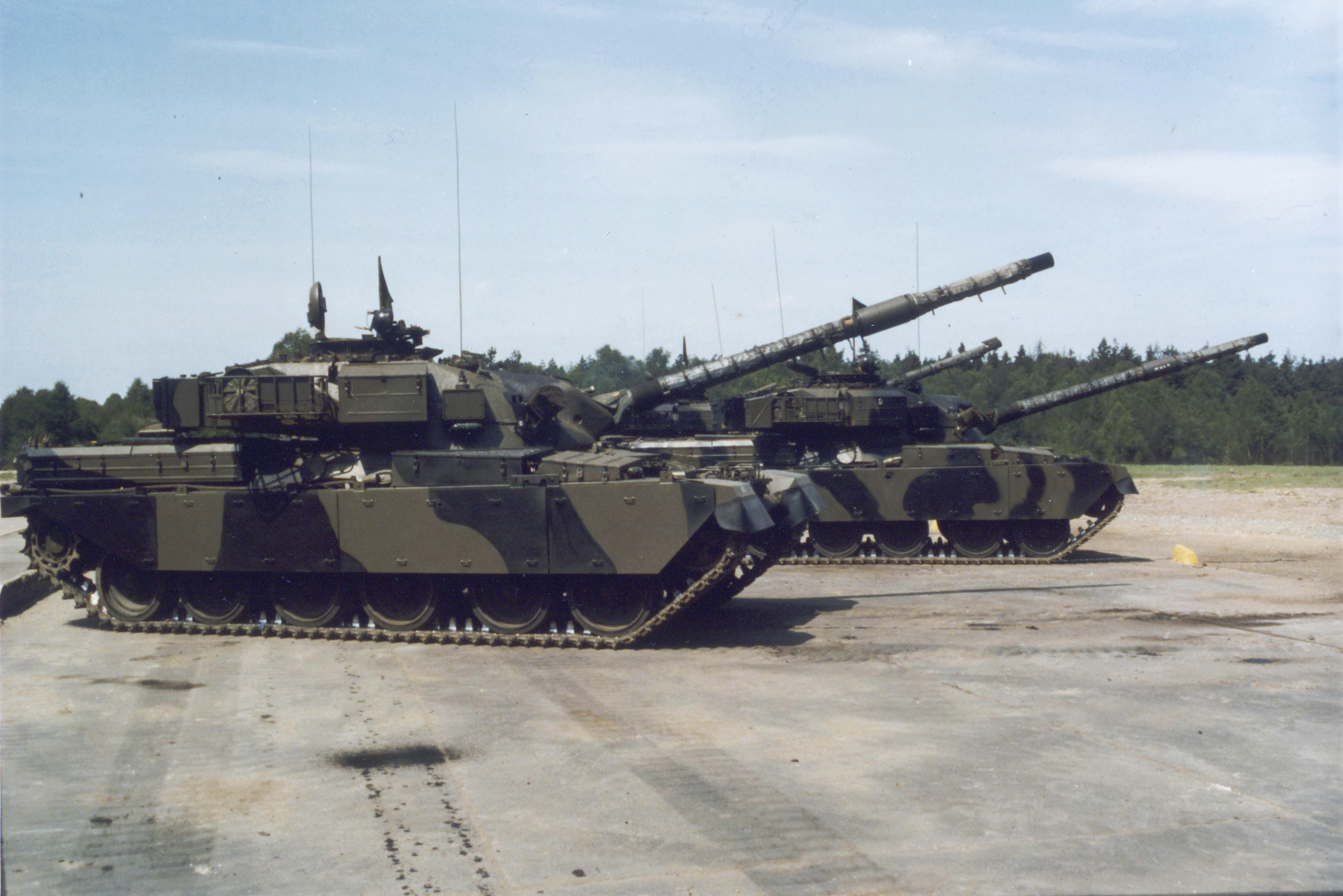
Chieftain tanks at the Canadian Army Trophy in 1979.

The left side of the turret had a large searchlight with an electrically controlled infrared filter inside an armoured box, with a relatively long range – up to 1–1.5 kilometres (0.62–0.93 mi).

From the beginning of the 1970s, the Mk 3/3 version replaced the ranging gun with a Barr and Stroud LF-2 laser rangefinder with a 10 km (6.2 mi) range. This allowed engagements at much longer ranges, and also could be linked to the fire control system, allowing more rapid engagements and changes of target.

On later models, fire control was provided by the Marconi IFCS (Improved Fire Control System), using a digital ballistic computer. The upgrade was not finished until the end of 1980, when some examples (but not the majority) had the IR searchlight replaced with TOGS. Many later examples had Stillbrew armour, intended to defeat Soviet 115 mm APFSDS rounds. These became the Mark 10 and then Mk 11 version. The Chieftain used the TESS (TElescopic Sighting System) developed in the early 1980s that was later sold as surplus for use on the RAF Phantom aircraft.

== Service ==
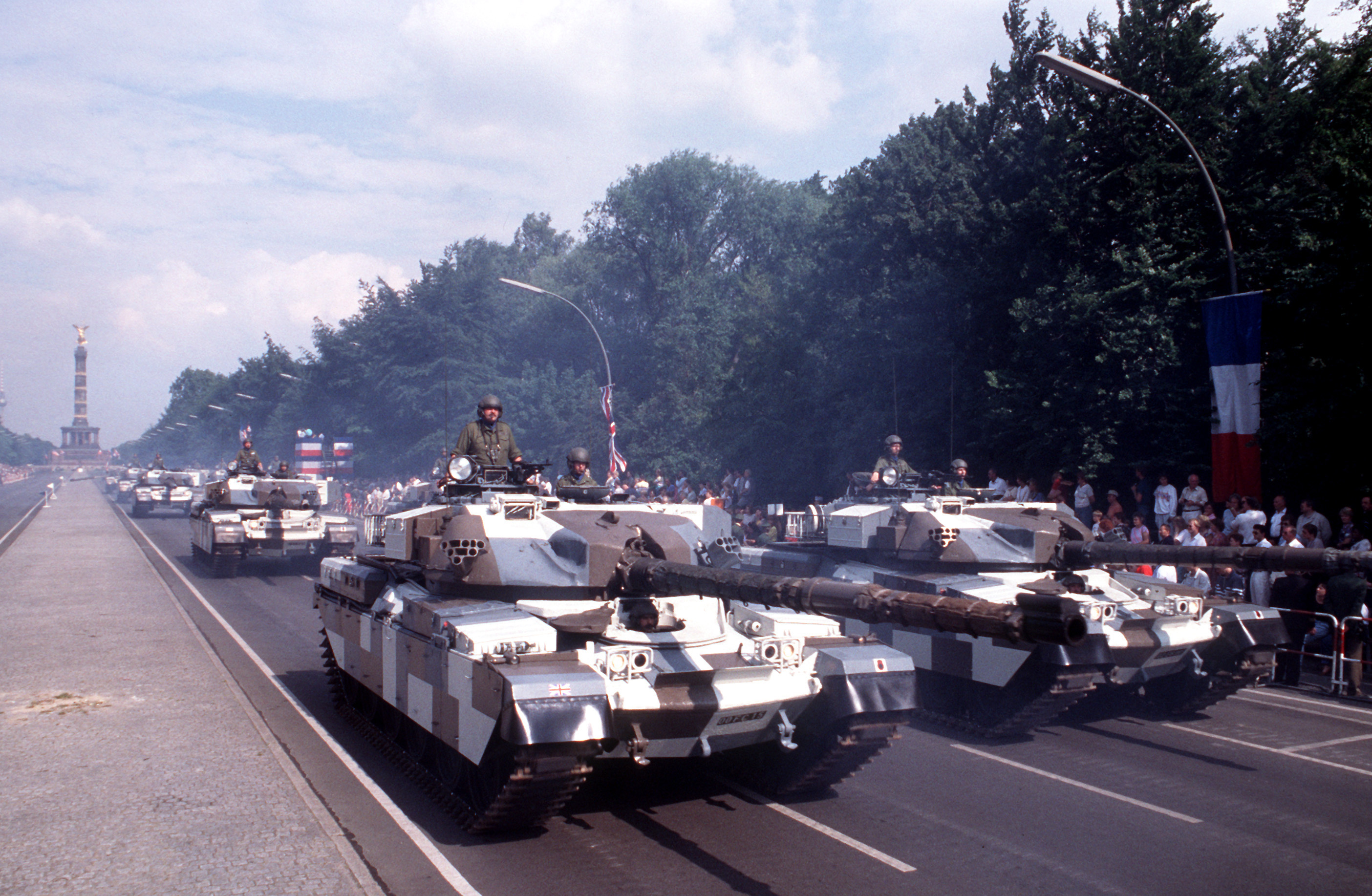
Chieftain tanks of 14th/20th King's Hussars on parade with urban camouflage, Straße des 17. Juni, West Berlin, 18 June 1989.

During the Cold War, Chieftain tanks were deployed in units of the British Army of the Rhine (BAOR) in West Germany to defend against a possible Warsaw Pact attack on the country.

Like its European competitors, the Chieftain found a large export market in the Middle East, but unlike the Centurion, it was not adopted by any other NATO or Commonwealth country.

The Chieftain proved itself capable in combat and able to be upgraded, both for overall improvement and to meet local requirements. It was continuously upgraded until the early 1990s, when it was replaced by Challenger 1. The final Chieftain version, which was used by the British Army until 1995, incorporated "Stillbrew" armour named after Colonel Still and John Brewer from the Military Vehicles and Engineering Establishment (MVEE), the Improved Fire Control System (IFCS) and the Thermal Observation Gunnery Sight (TOGS). The last British Regiment equipped with Chieftains was the 1st Royal Tank Regiment, which was based at Aliwal Barracks, Tidworth.

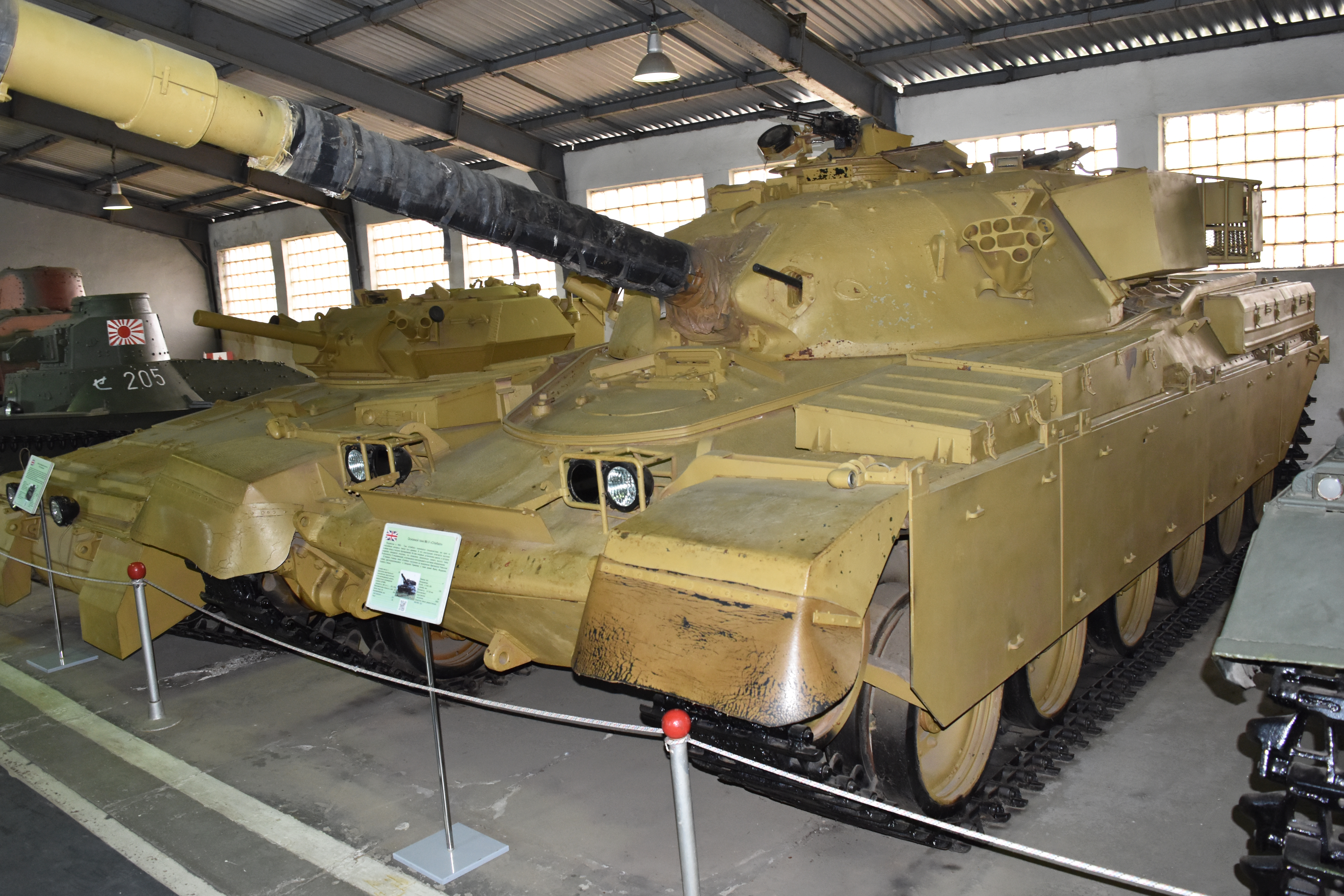
A former Iranian Army Chieftain Mk.5 main battle tank on display at the Kubinka Tank Museum in Russia

The first model was introduced in 1967. Chieftains were supplied to at least six countries, including Iran, Kuwait, Oman and Jordan. An agreement for sales to Israel and local production was cancelled by the British Government in 1969, despite considerable Israeli technical and tactical input into the development of the tank, especially the capacity to operate successfully in desert environments, and the provision for the tank to make good use of hull-down positioning. Two examples were delivered to, and extensively trialled by, the Israeli Armoured Corps. This experience spurred the creation of the indigenous Israeli Merkava, the development programme was led by General Israel Tal, who had worked closely with the British in the Anglo-Israeli Chieftain project. The largest foreign sale was to Iran, who, at the recommendation of General Tal, took delivery of 707 Mk-3P and Mk-5P (the letter P standing for Persia), as well as 187 FV4030-1, 41 ARV and 14 AVLB before the 1979 revolution. Further planned deliveries of the more capable FV4030-2 (Shir 1) and FV4030-3 (Shir 2) series were cancelled at that point.

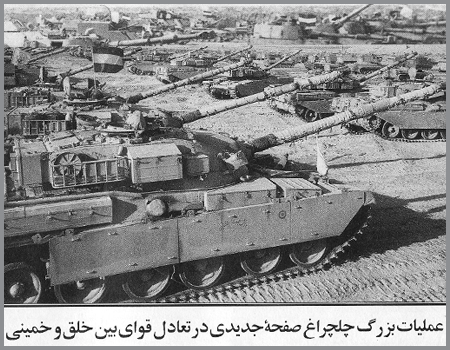
Formation of Chieftain tanks captured in Operation Forty Stars

It was in the Middle East that the Chieftain was to see all of its operational experience. It was first used extensively by Iran, during the Iran–Iraq War of 1980–88, including the largest tank battle of the war, with mixed results as the Chieftain Mk 3/5 suffered from chronic engine problems and low power-to-weight ratio, making it unreliable and slow when manoeuvering over harsh terrain, which in turn made it prone to breakdowns in the midst of battle or a sluggish target and thus vulnerable to enemy tank fire. After the tank battle at Susangerd, captured Chieftains of the Iranian 92nd Armored Division were taken back to Baghdad for trials. According to Aladdin Makki, the Iraqi Army Corps chief of staff, in a post-war interview, Iraqi sabot rounds "Went through the front armour of the Chieftain and came out the backside". This as well as the Chieftain's poor off-road capability influenced the Iraqis to reject British arms sale propositions, who were at the time courting Iraq for arms sales that included Chieftain MBT's. According to Makki, when the British telephoned the Iraqi director of Armor, Salah Askar, he responded with "We don't want your stupid tanks!" Ra'ad Al-Hamdani, an Iraqi general in the Republican Guard, also expressed negative opinion on the Chieftain's performance in combat, stating "The 16th Iranian Armored Division, which was equipped with Chieftain tanks, lost a battle against the 10th Iraqi Armored Brigade with T-72 tanks. It is hard for an armored brigade to destroy a division in 12 hours but it happened; it was a disaster for the Iranians". Out of the 894 Chieftain tanks that had started the war only 200 were left by the war's end.

The Chieftain remains in service in Iran, with the Mobarez tank being a locally upgraded version.

=== Kuwait and the Battle of the Bridges ===
Kuwait had 143 Chieftains on the eve of the 1990 Iraqi Invasion of Kuwait. Thirty-seven Chieftains of the Kuwaiti 35th Armored Brigade fought at the Battle of the Bridges against elements of the Iraqi Hammurabi and Medina divisions before withdrawing over the Saudi border. Kuwaiti 35th Armored Brigade failed to block the Mutla Pass and were ineffective at delaying the Iraqis, however they withdrew into the desert and became part of Joint Command Forces East during the 1991 Gulf War.

Besides those of the 35th Armored Brigade, the rest of the Kuwaiti Armed Forces' Chieftains (136 tanks) were either destroyed or captured by the invading forces after they had been abandoned by their Kuwaiti crews when their ammunition ran out. After the liberation of Kuwait, the ageing Chieftains were replaced by the Yugoslav M-84.

== Specifications (Mk. 5) ==
- Crew: 4
- Combat weight: 55 tons
- Overall length: 10.8 m (35 ft 5.2 in) gun forward
- Hull length: 7.5 m (24 ft 7.3 in)
- Height: 2.9 m (9 ft 6.2 in)
- Width: 3.5 m (11 ft 5.8 in)
- Powerplant: Opposed-piston engine Leyland L60 (diesel, multi-fuel compression ignition) 750 bhp (560 kW)
- Range: 500 km (310 mi)
- Maximum road speed: 43 km/h (27 mph)
- Cross-country speed: 30 km/h (19 mph)
- Armour: turret front, 240 mm (9.4 in) to 280 mm (11.0 in) cast steel

Armament

- 120 mm L11A5 rifled tank gun
  - Rate of fire: 10 rounds per minute for the first minute and 6 thereafter.
  - Elevation: −10 to +20 degree
  - Laser rangefinder
- Coaxial L8A1 7.62 mm machine gun
- Cupola-mounted L37A1 7.62mm machine gun

Mark 1 and Mark 2 models had a coaxial Browning .50-inch (12.7 mm) ranging machine guns prior to the introduction of the laser rangefinder on the Mark 3/3 then later the Mark 5 model.

Equipment

- Twin Clansman VRC 353 VHF Radio sets (1979 onward)
- 1 C42 1 B47 Larkspur VHF radios (pre 1979)
- 2 X 6-barrel smoke dischargers on turret
- Bulldozer blade (optional – fitted to one tank per squadron)

== Variants ==
FV4201 P1 – FV4201 P7
Prototypes. Seven built, 485 hp (362 kW) (Note: Net engine horsepower rating; gross (SAE) figures are approximately 100 hp (75 kW) higher.) L60 Mk 1 or 485 hp (362 kW) L60 Mk 4, (Note: All variants of the L60 were interchangeable and could be fitted to any Mark of vehicle. Vehicles at the factory were fitted with the latest variant of L60 being produced with earlier vehicles in service being upgraded to the current L60 variant as soon as sufficient numbers of the later engine variant became available, the removed earlier engines then being rebuilt to the current L60 standard where possible. Changing an engine usually took around 1.5 to two hours.) initial vehicles had internal exhaust silencers, short hull, (Note: The original design had the engine exhaust silencers mounted internally at the rear of the engine compartment however a re-design of the TN12 transmission resulted in an increase in gearbox length requiring the exhaust silencers to be resited in an external armoured box at the rear of the hull.) small diameter road wheels. In an attempt at reducing the overall height of the vehicle the original design used road wheels of a smaller diameter which gave insufficient ground clearance. They were later replaced with Centurion road wheels of a larger diameter and by careful re-positioning of their mountings along with adjustment of the idler and final drive mountings resulted in a vehicle height only 1 in (25 mm) higher than with the original smaller wheels. Initial vehicle weight 45 long tons (46 t); 49.5 long tons (50.3 t) for later vehicles, 1959-1962

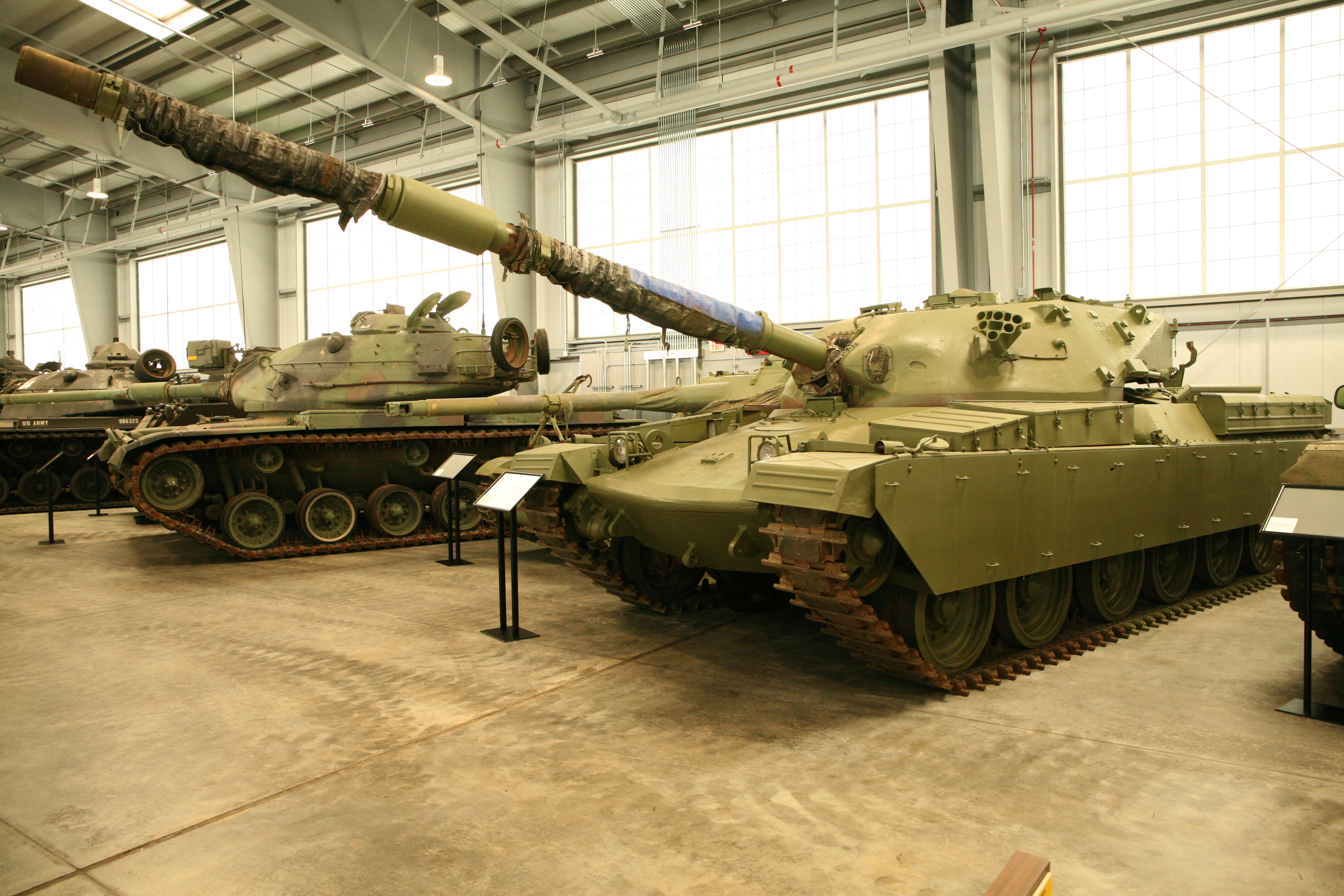
Chieftain Mk 1 at the U.S. Army Armor & Cavalry Collection at Fort Benning, Georgia

Chieftain Mk.1
40 training vehicles for 1965–1966 with 585 hp (436 kW) L60 Mk 4 engine, strengthened TN12 gearbox, (Note: Note: initial TN12's proved insufficiently robust on Chieftain prototype/pilot vehicles, having been based on a gearbox designed for an engine of lower power output for use in the abortive FV300 project.) exhaust silencers moved to external armoured box on hull rear plate, larger 'Centurion' 31.6-inch (80 cm) diameter road wheels, (Note: Chieftain road wheels are the same as those of Centurion and are interchangeable.) re-positioned final drive and idler wheel assemblies, two-piece commander's hatch cover, rubber track pads fitted for road protection in West Germany, (Note: British Army Chieftains were destined for service with the BAOR in the-then West Germany and would of necessity make much use of German roads.) resilient rubber coaming around engine rear decking to prevent damage from gun with gun depression when turret traversed to the rear, stowage rack added to left rear of turret, dummy stowage 'bin' on front glacis and canvas cover over turret nose to conceal ballistic shapes, (Note: These and other modifications had been initially trialled on Prototype vehicles before the MK.1 design had been frozen for production.) weight 50 long tons (51 t), Issued to 1 RTR and 5 RTR for troop trials. All Mk.1 to Mk.1/4 vehicles were subsequently to be based at Bovington Camp and Catterick Garrison. 11 short hull units converted to become Chieftain, Armoured Vehicle-Launched Bridge Mk.6 (CH AVLB Mk 6).
Chieftain Mk.1/2
Upgrade of Chieftain Mk.1 to Chieftain Mk.2 standard, fitted with 650 hp L60 Mk 4A2 engine, training use only
Chieftain Mk.1/3
Upgrade of Chieftain Mk.1, fitted with 650 hpL60 Mk 5A engine, training use only
Chieftain Mk.1/4
Upgrade of Chieftain Mk.1, fitted with 650 hp L60 Mk 6A engine and improved ranging gun, (Note: The ranging machine gun was a uniquely British method of ranging preferred over the optical range finders used by other nations. The gun uses ammunition ballistically-matched to HESH ammunition at ranges out to 1,300 metres (2,500 metres in the Chieftain MK.3/3.) APDS rounds were aimed using aiming marks displaced from centre which when aligned with the bullet impact points compensated for the ammunition's flatter trajectory. The ranging machine gun was fired in three-round bursts) training use only.

Chieftain Mk.2
First service model with 650 hp L60 Mk 4A2 engine, L11A2 or L11A3 main gun, (Note: Note; original gunnery requirement for FV4201 was for the ability to hit a vehicle-sized target at 1,000 yards (910 m) at night. Upon metrification ranges quoted changed from using yards to using metres) NBC system fitted to rear of turret, revised turret stowage, one-piece commander's hatch cover, armour removed from searchlight cover, rigid flotation panels replaced by facility for deep wading, road speed 25 mph (40 km/h), (Note: Vehicle speeds are governed.) range 250 miles (400 km), weight 51.5 long tons (52.3 t), first vehicles issued to 11th Hussars at Hohne in West Germany in early 1967, improved 650 hp (480 kW) L60 Mk 5A engine fitted 1969
Chieftain Mk.3
Improved 650 hp L60 Mk 6A engine with two-stage air cleaner, improved auxiliary generator (Coventry Climax H30 (Note: Known as the "Generating Unit Engine" (GUE), this engine was a three-cylinder opposed-piston two stroke diesel of 1 litre capacity. Its purpose was to drive a 24 volt, 500-amp, generator to provide electrical power when the main engine was not running.)), better stowage, new No. 15 Mk 2 commander's cupola, road speed improved to 30 mph (48 km/h), range increased to 310 miles (500 km), weight 53 long tons (54 t), 1970
Chieftain Mk 3/2
Fitted with 720 hp (540 kW) L60 Mk 7A, 1971
Chieftain Mk 3/3
Fitted with 720 hp L60 Mk 7A, Improved main gun range finding, (Note: Ranging gun effectiveness improved to 2,500 metres range. All service Chieftains were subsequently upgraded with the LF2 laser range finder with ranging out to in excess of 5,000 metres. Vehicles upgraded with the LF2 TLS had an "L" suffice appended to the Mark No.) provision for Barr & Stroud TLS (Tank Laser Sight) LF2 (Note: Officially; Sight, Laser Rangefinder, Periscopic, A.F.V,, No. 1, Mark I) laser range finder, (Note: The LF2 laser range finder had a ranging accuracy of +/- 10 m at 10,000 metres.) With the LF2, the Chieftain became the first vehicle to be fitted with such a range-finding system. 1971
Chieftain Mk 3/G
Chieftain Mk.3 with engine induction through fighting compartment. Prototype only
Chieftain Mk.3/3P
Chieftain Mk 3/3 for Iran, 1973
Chieftain Mk 3/S
Production version of Chieftain Mk 3/G with commander's firing control (Note: Note; this allowed the tank commander to fire the main gun and was subsequently fitted to all service Chieftains.)
Chieftain Mk.4
Chieftain Mk.3 with increased fuel capacity for Israel Defense Forces (IDF). Only two built. 1973. (Note: Standard fuel capacity for other vehicles was 195 imperial gallons (890 L).) The Chieftain Mk.4 project was halted at the behest of the British Government due to the perceived adverse effect the sale of Chieftain to Israel was likely to have on the balance of power within the region. Of the two Mk.4 vehicles built, one was scrapped, the other "02 SP 27" was fitted with an NCK Rapier crane and used at Kirkcudbright Training Area
Chieftain Mk.5
Final production variant, 750 hp (560 kW) L60 Mark 8A, with upgrades to the NBC protection system, weight 54 long tons (55 t), 1975
Chieftain Mk.5/5P
Chieftain Mk.5 for Iran, 1975. Engine later upgraded to 750 hp (560 kW) L60 Mk 10A, 1977
Chieftain Mk.5/2K
Chieftain Mk.5 for Kuwait, 1975

In 1975 all British Army earlier Marks of tanks except Mark 1s were upgraded to Chieftain Mk.5 standard as part of the 1975 "Totem Pole" programme. "Exercise Totem Pole" was carried out in six-to-nine phases depending on the Mark of vehicle being modified (Chieftain Mk.5's already had some of the required changes incorporated at the factory) between 1975 and 1979 and included fitment of the Marconi Improved Fire Control System (IFCS), replacement of the searchlight with the Barr & Stroud Thermal Observation Gunnery System (TOGS), along with modifications for using FSAPDS ammunition. Upon completion of each phase the vehicle received an additional suffix to the designation, e.g., "Chieftain Mk.3/S(Y)2" denoting a Mark 3/S having completed the first three phases of "Totem Pole". including addition of Clansman radios, (Note: Vehicles fitted with Clansman radios had a "C" suffix appended to the Mark No.) fitting of TLS, fitment of Muzzle Reference System (MRS) (Note: The Muzzle Reference System uses a laser beam reflected from a mirror at the muzzle to measure minute dimensional changes in the barrel due to temperature, humidity, etc., which are then compensated-for in the Fire Control System. The thermal sleeve had originally been developed to minimise such dimensional changes in the barrel which have an increasing effect on gun accuracy as ranges are increased. The effect on gunnery performance of the combined improvements in fire control would allow Chieftain gunners in practice shoots to achieve a first shot hit rate of 98% at ranges out to 1,500 meters. The MRS system was originally devised for the later abandoned FV4401 Contentious project.) upon replacement of L11A3 barrel with L11A5 barrel, (Note: Note; barrels became worn and needed replacement after firing a specified number of rounds during accumulated practice shoots.) and fitment of 750 hp L60 Mark 8A. These vehicles were re-designated Chieftain Mk's.6 to Mk.8.

Chieftain Mk.6
Chieftain Mk.2 upgraded to Chieftain Mk.5 standard, 1975 (Note: On fitment of the TLS the designation changed to Mk.6/L.)
Chieftain Mk.7
Chieftain Mk.3 and Chieftain Mk 3/S upgraded to Chieftain Mk.5 standard, 1975 (Note: On fitment of the TLS the designation changed to Mk.7/L.)
Chieftain Mk.7C
Chieftain Mk.3 upgraded to Chieftain Mk.5 standard for Oman
Chieftain Mk.8
Chieftain Mk.3/3 upgraded to Chieftain Mk.5 standard, 1975 (Note: On fitment of the TLS the designation changed to Mk.8/L.)

In 1977 the engines of all British Army vehicles were upgraded to the 750 hp L60 Mark 9A, followed by further upgrading with the L60 Mark 11A or L60 Mark 12A (Note: Mk 11A and Mk 12A engines were identical apart from minor difference in cylinder liner sealing) in 1978 as part of the 1977 "Dark Morn" and the 1978 "Sundance" programmes. "Exercise Sundance" concerned improvements in engine power, reliability, and other power train improvements, and was carried out in five main phases between 1976 and 1979. These, in themselves, had been preceded by "Dark Morn", "High Noon", and the initial "Fleetfoot" engine development programme which had completed in October 1971. Vehicles on which "Sundance" modifications had been carried out received an additional 'Z' suffix appended to their designations, the "Sundance" engines themselves were signified with a distinctive orange/yellow-coloured upper crankcase.

Chieftain Mk.9
Chieftain Mk.6 after completing all phases of "Totem Pole", 1979.
Chieftain Mk.10
Chieftain Mk.7 after completing all phases of "Totem Pole". Later upgraded with addition of Stillbrew Crew Protection Package which added additional armour to the turret front and turret ring to increase turret frontal protection against HEAT rounds, specifically, the improved variants of the Soviet-made RPG-7, etc., and consisted of conventional steel armour mounted on rubber pads to prevent vibration, (Note: The "Stillbrew" name is derived from the names of the developers, Col. Still, and John Brewer, of the Military Vehicles and Engineering Establishment.) 1984–86
Chieftain Mk.11
Chieftain Mk.8 after completing all phases of "Totem Pole". Later upgraded with Stillbrew, 1984–86
Chieftain Mk.12
Chieftain Mk.5 after completing all phases of "Totem Pole". Later upgraded with Stillbrew, 1984–86
Chieftain Mk.12/13
Proposed further upgrades, cancelled when the Challenger 1 was introduced.
Chieftain 800
Re-engined Iranian FV4030/1 Chieftain Mark 5/3P fitted with the 800 bhp (600 kW) Rolls-Royce CV8 TCA engine and the fully automatic TN12 Mk. 5 transmission.

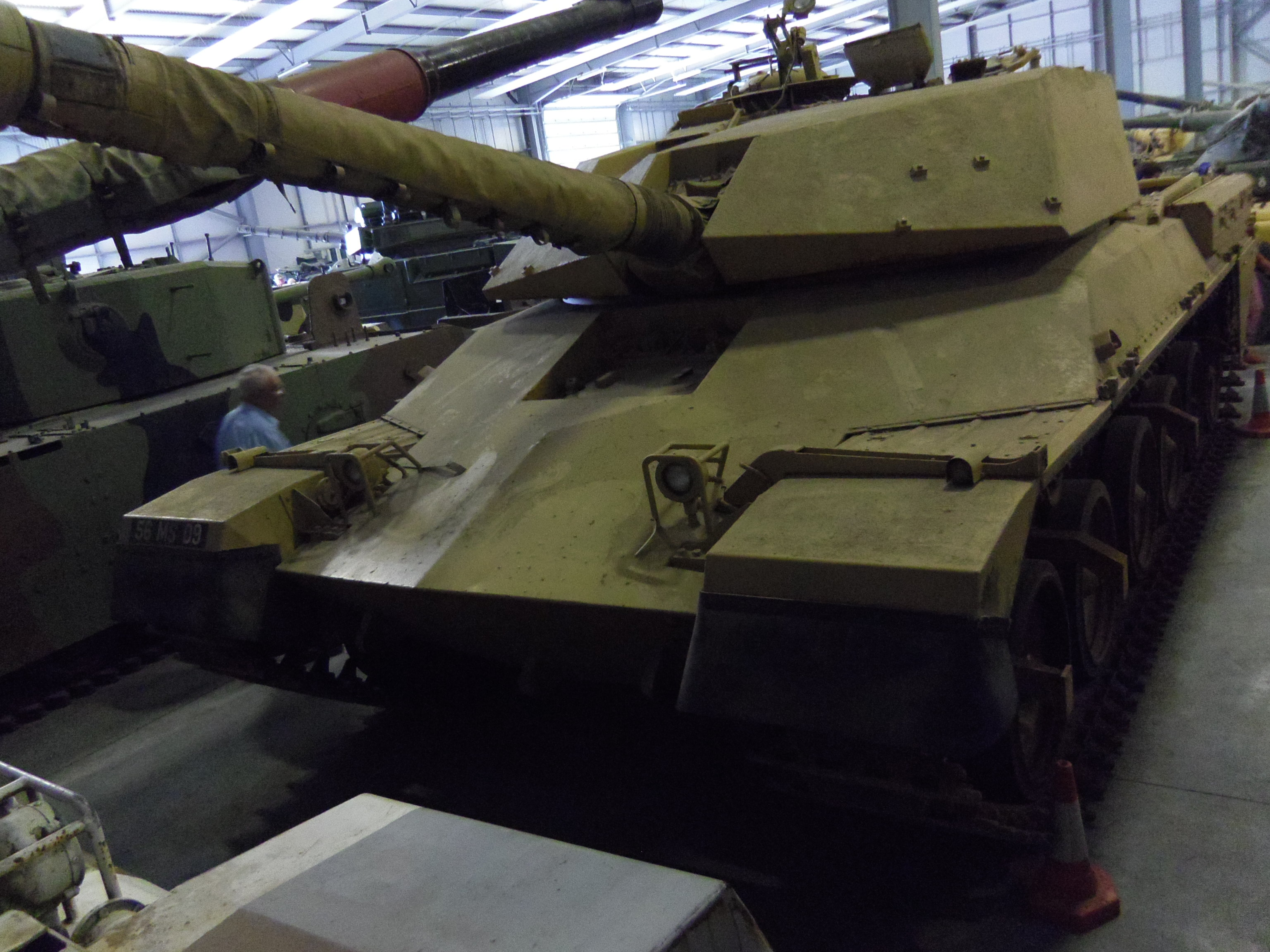
Chieftain 900 at the Bovington Tank Museum Vehicle Conservation Center in 2014

Chieftain 900
Two Mk. 5/3 (P) were converted by Royal Ordnance Factories by fitting the 900 bhp (670 kW) Rolls-Royce Condor 900E engine and the fully automatic TN12-1000 version of the Chieftain's gearbox, hence the name of Chieftain 900. The two Chieftain 900 prototypes were built in April 1982 and were exhibited the same year at the British Army Equipment Exhibition (BAEE). They were not fitted with real Chobham armour but were mocked up with cosmetic sheet-metal cladding to simulate the Chobham armour package. The project was abandoned by 1986.

FV4030/1 Chieftain Mk. 5/3 (P) « Persia »
Also known as "Project 4030 Phase 1" or "Improved Chieftain". The Mk. 5/3P featured the Tank Laser Sight (TLS), the Muzzle Reference System (MRS), a fully automatic controller for the TN12 gearbox, a 50 imp gal (230 L; 60 US gal) fuel capacity increase, thickened underbelly mine armour and shock absorbers fitted to the front and rear suspension units. 185 vehicles were built between August 1976 and late 1977/early 1978.
FV4030/2 Shir (Lion) 1
Also known as "4030 Phase 2". This tank formed Phase 2 of the Iranian contract for the supply of a new generation of MBTs (Phase 1 being for an Improved Chieftain). This project began in 1974. Shir 1 incorporated the Chieftain hull front and turret casting. The rear of the hull was reconfigured to accept a new power pack comprising Rolls-Royce CV12 1,200 hp (890 kW) (a turbocharged V12 four-stroke diesel engine), David Brown TN37 transmission and new cooling group. An improved bogie suspension (Super Horstmann), new final drives and tracks were included. The first vehicle-ran in April 1977 and no production deliveries had taken place when the project was cancelled in February 1979.

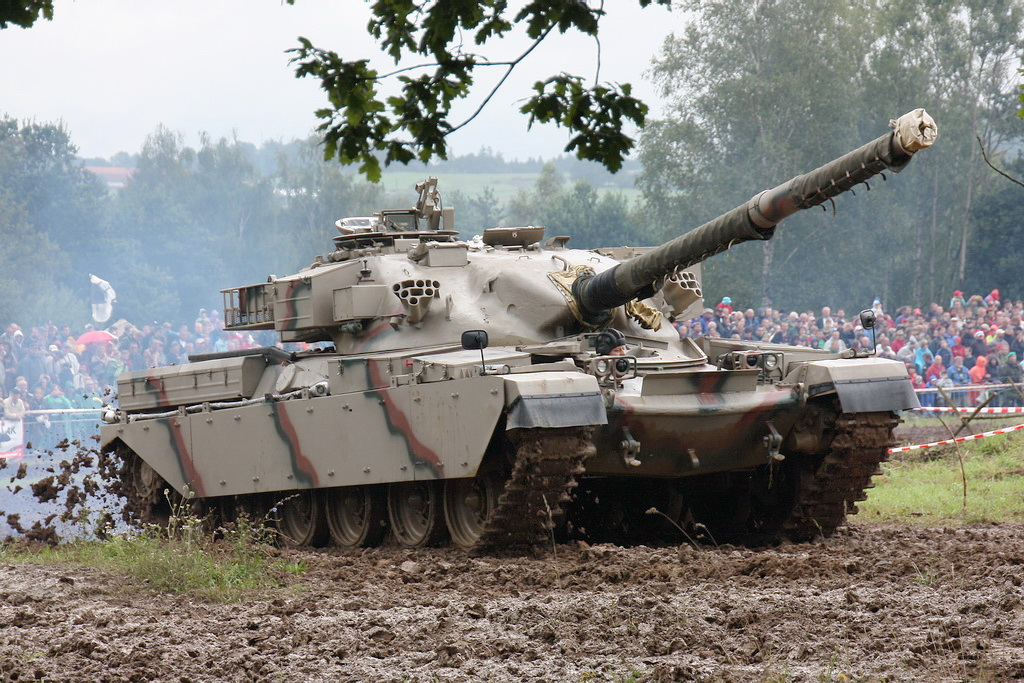
Khalid variant

Khalid
Also known as "4030 Phase 2 Jordan". The sale of 274 MBTs was negotiated with Jordan in June 1979 following the cancellation of the Iranian contract. The Khalid tank is based on the Shir 1 design with the addition of the Integrated Fire Control System (IFCS), Tank Laser Sight (TLS) and the No 84 Day/Night Sight. The first 125 were reworked Shir 1s and the remaining 149 were new production tanks. The order has been completed, the first being delivered in July 1981.
FV4030/3 Shir 2
Also known as "'4030 Phase 3'" Iranian variant. The Shir 2 represented a completely new-MBT incorporating Chobham armour (renamed "Pageant" to avoid diplomatic incident with the US government) to the hull and turret, with the rear of the hull similar in design to the Shir 1. The fire control, gun control and automotive systems were the same as Shir 1 with the following exceptions: Automotive - the option of adopting hydrogas suspension and command & control, the new No 84 commander's (PPE) day/night sight. The project began in 1974 and the first vehicle ran in October 1978. The production order was for 1,200 MBTs and production release given for 250 before cancellation in February 1979. Not delivered, the Shir 2 tanks became FV4030/4 Challenger 1 tanks after reworking at ROF Leeds.
Mobarez Tank
Iranian upgraded version of Chieftain.
Chieftain/ T95
Development of the FV4201 Chieftain allowed for the interchangeability of guns with the U.S. T95 tank by means of exchanging turrets. The project was discontinued because of numerous problems with training crews to master two artillery systems. Equipped with a 90mm T208 (rifled) gun.
FV4211
Test vehicle using Chieftain automotive sub systems (including the 750 bhp (560 kW) L60 engine), embodied in a new aluminium hull and turret structure incorporating Chobham Armour (CA) (Note: The armour was originally developed under the "Burlington" code name, later it became more widely known as "Chobham armour", after the location of the MVEE) for the first time. The project began in October 1969. A feasibility study was completed by February 1970 which led to MVEE being asked to design and produce a prototype within a year. This timescale was achieved, the MVEE produced the first prototype in February 1971. Although the project was officially discontinued in 1972, research work within MVEE continued until 1974. A paper study on a Mk. 2 version was carried out and was considered during the FMBT (Future Main Battle Tank) studies in 1974. (Note: Vehicle registration number "03SP13".)

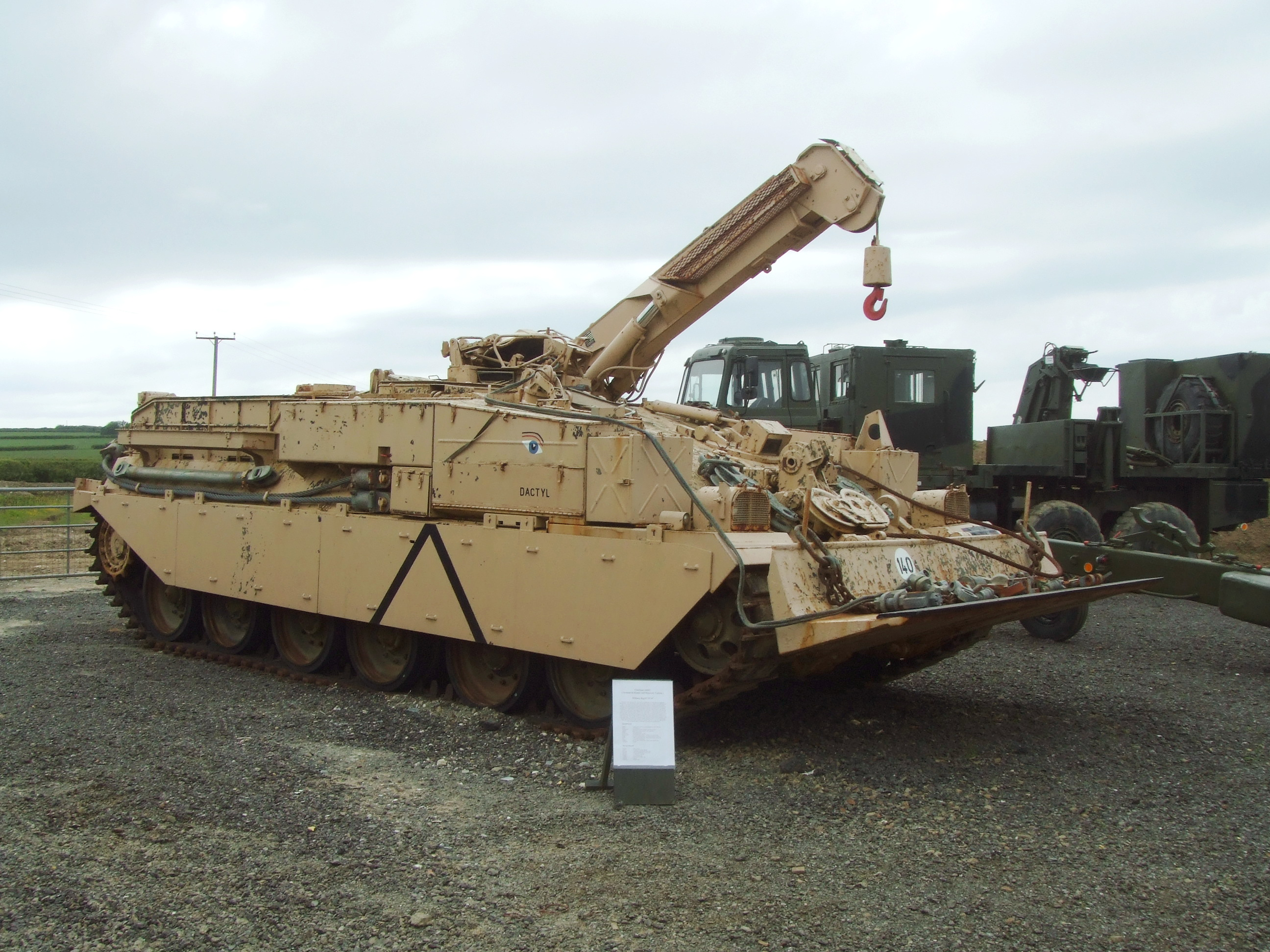
ARRV

FV4204 ARV/ARRV
Armoured Recovery Vehicle, Armoured Recovery and Repair Vehicle.
FV4205 AVLB Mk5
Bridge-laying vehicle

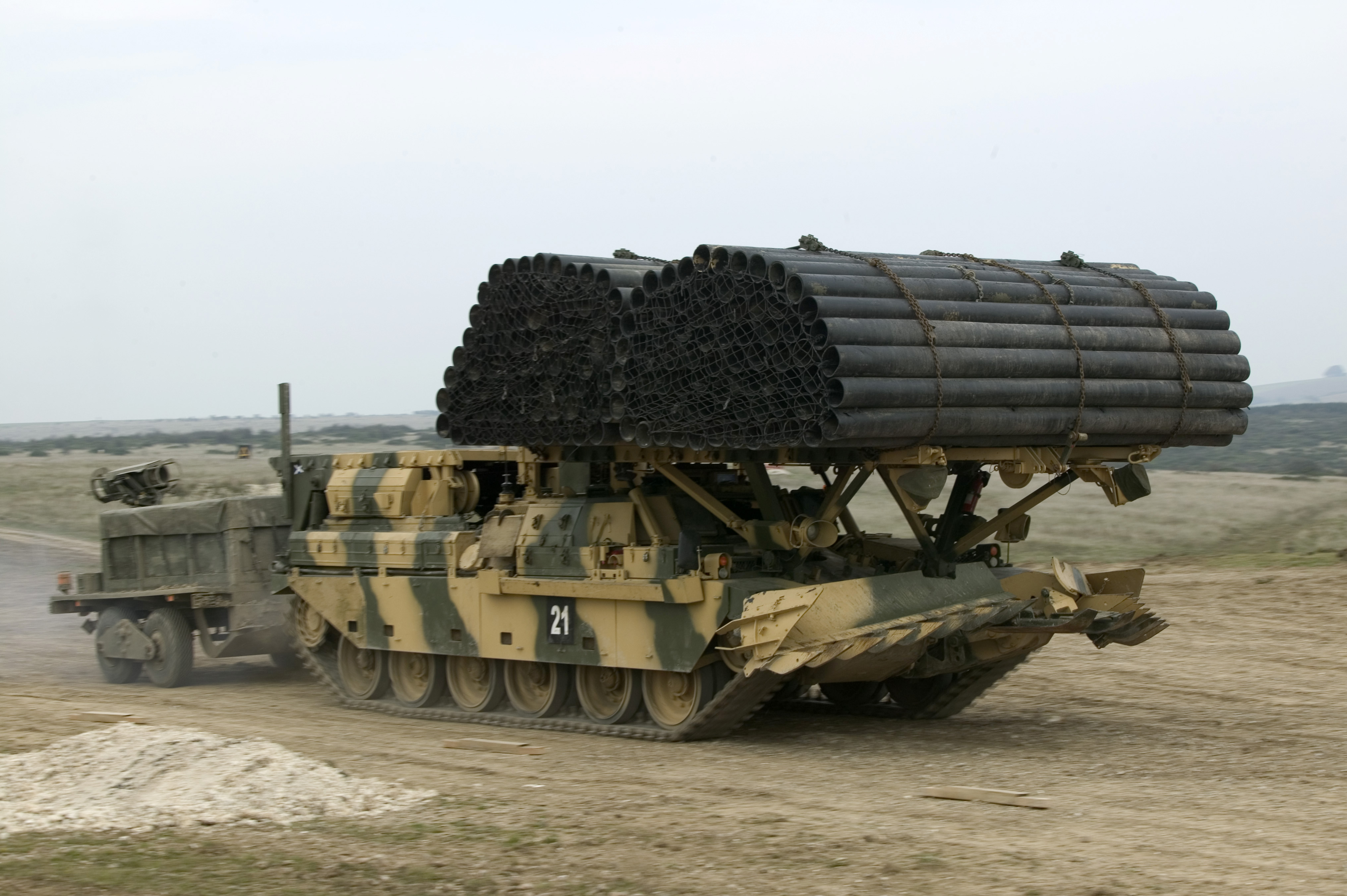
An AVRE carrying fascine and towing Python on Salisbury Plain.

Chieftain AVRE (CHAVRE)
Armoured Vehicle Royal Engineers, twelve early "Willich Chieftain AVRE" vehicles converted by 32 Armoured Engineer Regiment and 21 Engineer Base Workshop of the Royal Engineers, Willich, 1987, remaining 48 ex MBTs converted by Vickers Defence Ltd, 1991, to be a British Army combat engineering variant used by the Royal Engineers.
Chieftain Fascine Layer
Four turret-less vehicles specially converted for laying fascines
Chieftain Marksman
Self-propelled anti-aircraft gun version, equipped with the Marksman twin gun turret.
Chieftain Mineclearer
Mine-clearing development.
Chieftain Sabre
Twin 30 mm AA turret.
Chieftain SID
Chieftain Signature Integration Demonstrator.
Two vehicles modified from Chieftain Mk.12 for TRIGAT trials aimed at reducing battlefield reflectivity and emissions

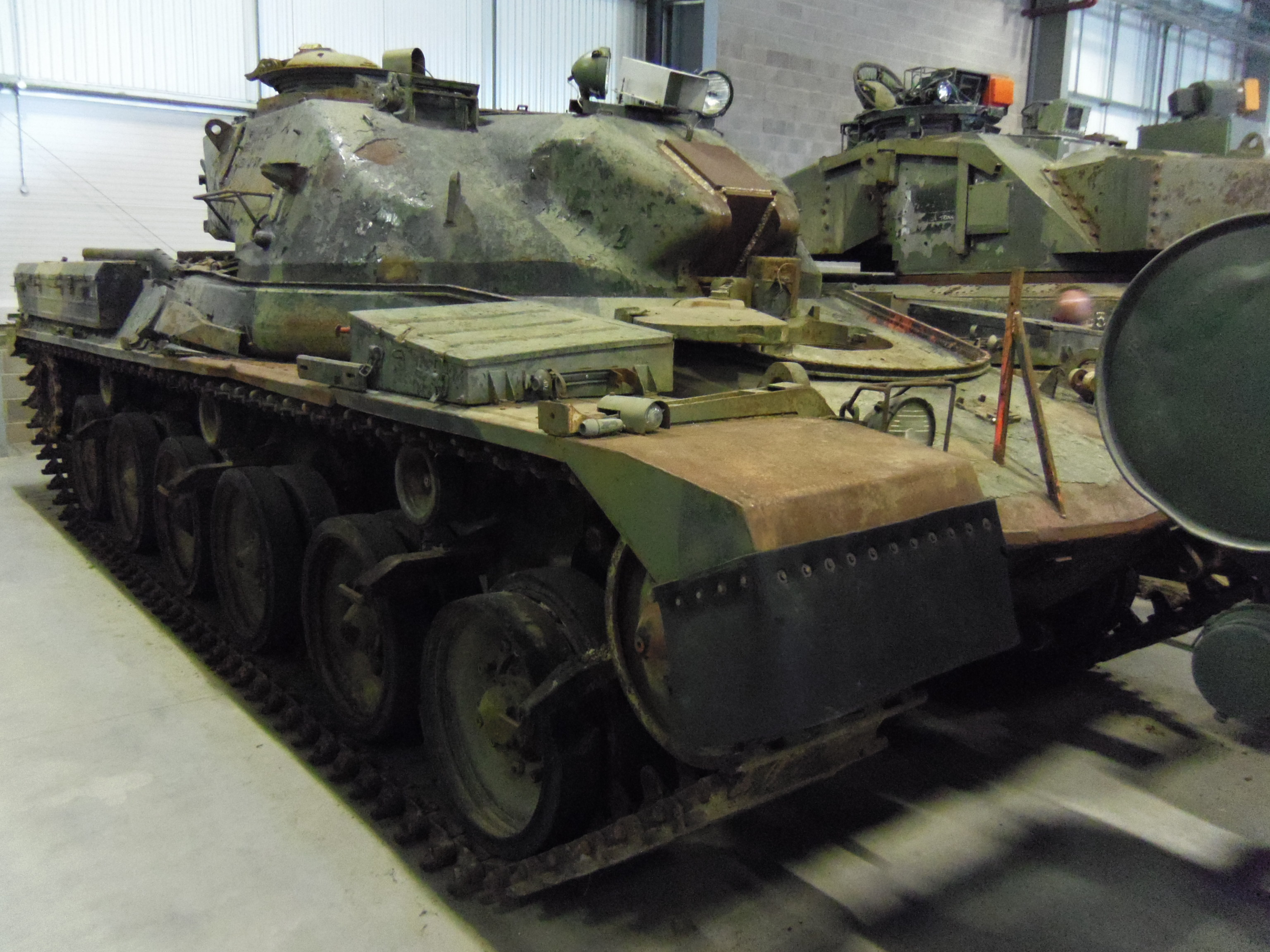
Chieftain Crazy Horse range target at Bovington in 2014

Chieftain Crazy Horse
Mobile Range Hard Target.
Modified from Chieftain Mk.1 with gun removed and incorporating Skyleader radio control. Remotely controlled range target for use with inert rounds. Used in conjunction with modified Alvis Stormer command vehicle. One built. 1987.
Weapon Carriers
The Chieftain chassis was adapted to mount air defence weapons ("Marksman" 2 x 35 mm cannon) and a 155 mm howitzer in a number of variants.

== Operators ==
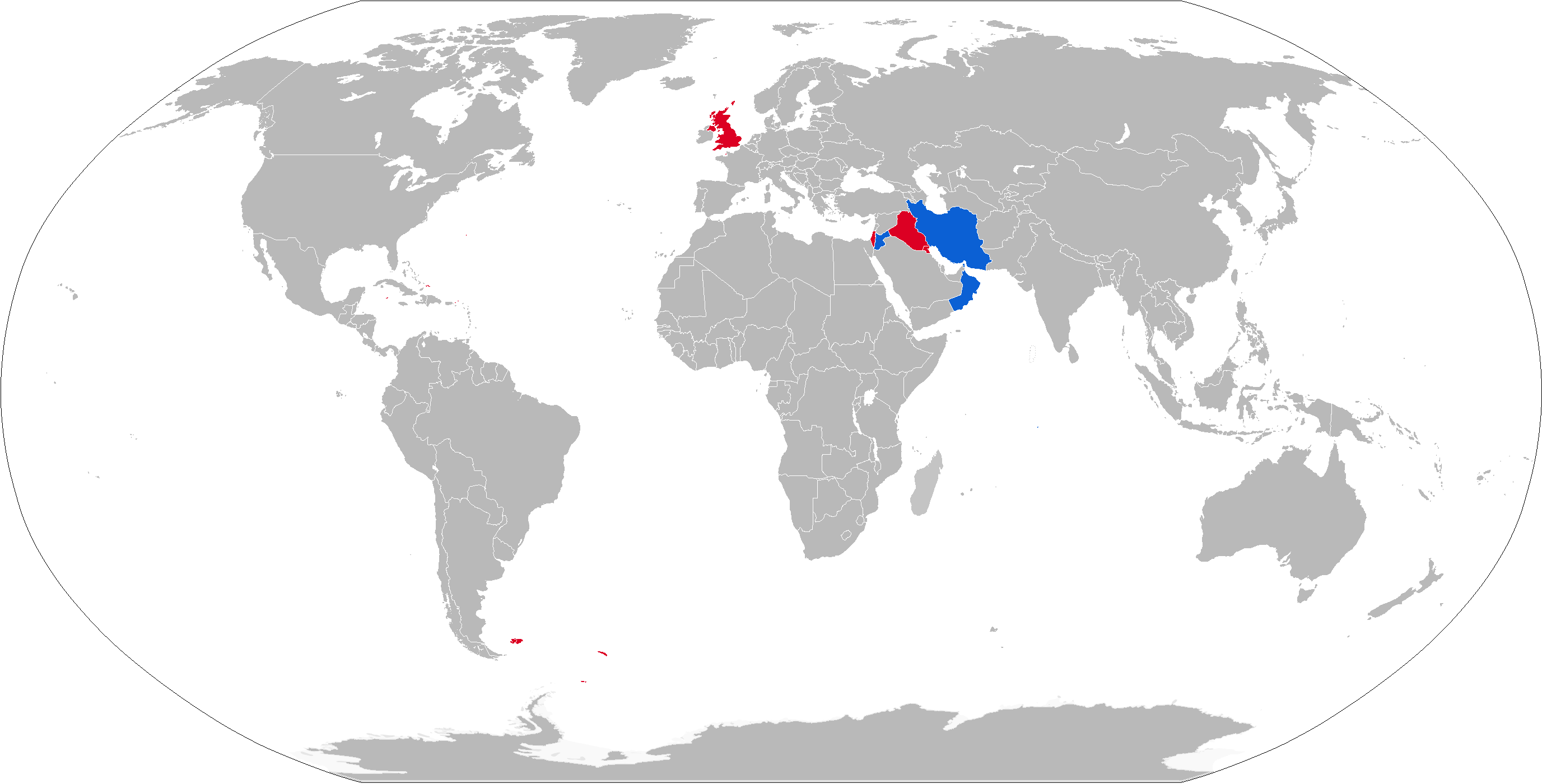
Operators Current Former

=== Current ===
- Iran: 100 Chieftain Mk3/Mk5 and 20 ARV in 2004. In the 1970s, Iran's Pahlavi government ordered and received 979 Chieftains including 707 Mark 3/3P and 5P MBTs, 71 Chieftain ARVs (fitted with Atlas cranes), 14 AVLBs, and 187 FV4030/1.
- Oman: 27 delivered 1981–85.

=== Former ===
- United Kingdom: Used from 1965 to 1995.
- Jordan: 274 Khalid delivered between 1981 and 1985 + 90 MK3/5 (captured Iranian tanks) from Iraq. In storage.
- Iraq: 50-75 tanks, captured from Iran, in service with Iraqi Army in 1990. Most upgraded to Khalid-level, with air conditioning for the crew and reinforced armour and night vision.

=== Evaluation-only ===
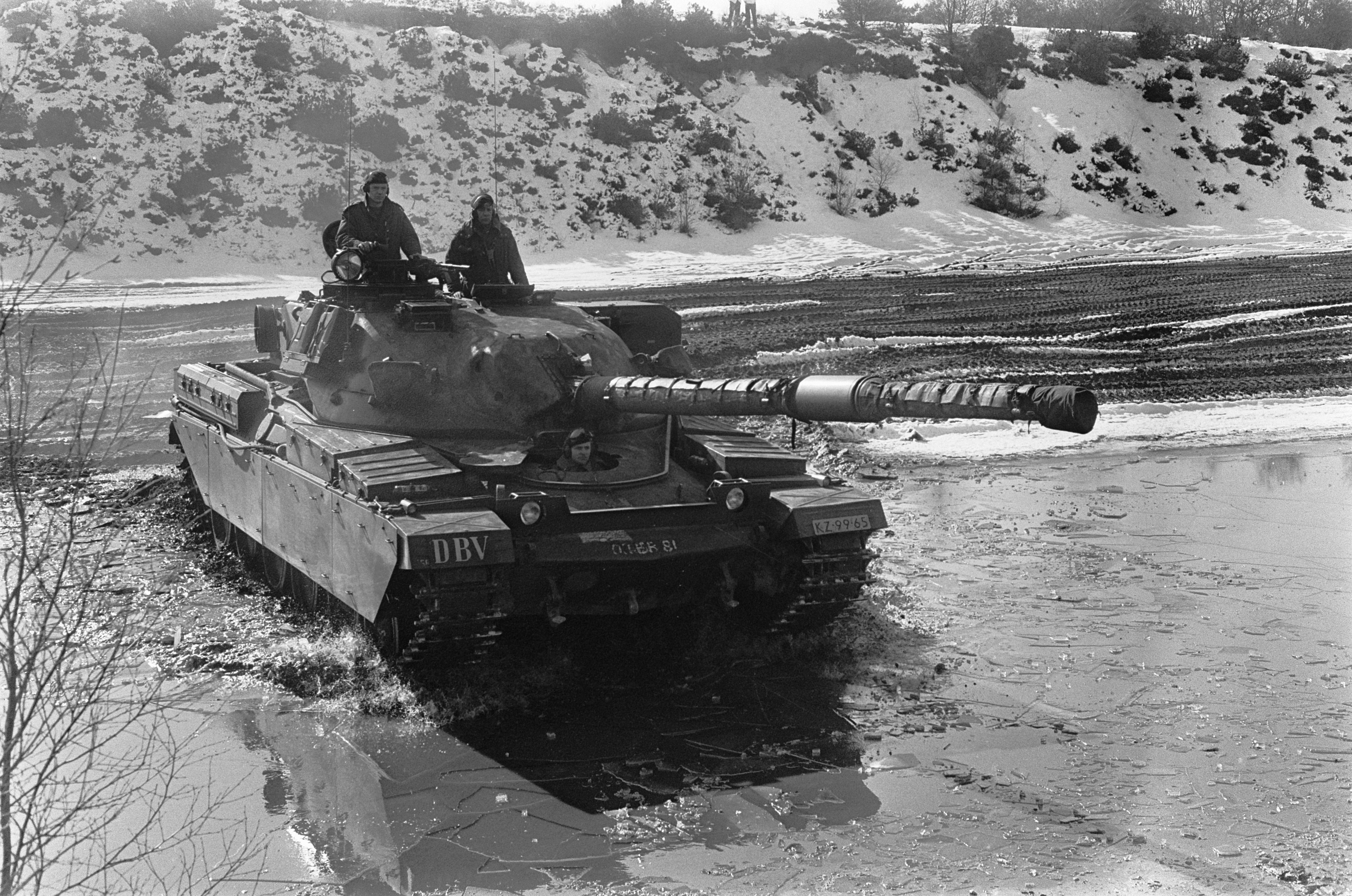
Chieftain Mk.2 trialled by the Dutch army, 1968.

- Israel: Two prototypes for evaluation c. 1966.
- Netherlands: One Chieftain was tested alongside a Leopard tank between 15 January and 22 March 1968 by the Detachement ter Beproeving van Voertuigen ("Detachment for Testing of Vehicles") of the Royal Netherlands Army; the tank was allocated British registration number 03 EB 81 and Dutch number KZ-99-65. The Leopard was eventually selected largely because of the Chieftain's poor construction quality, especially the engine, which leaked so much oil that the engine compartment turned black.

== See also ==
=== Tanks of comparable role, performance and era ===
- Leopard 1 – (Germany)
- Merkava tank – (Israel) (Early models)
- M60 tank – (United States)
- T-55M – (Soviet Union)
- T-62 – (Soviet Union)
- T-64 – (Soviet Union)
- T-72 – (Soviet Union)
