= 9M117 Bastion =

Russian anti-tank missile

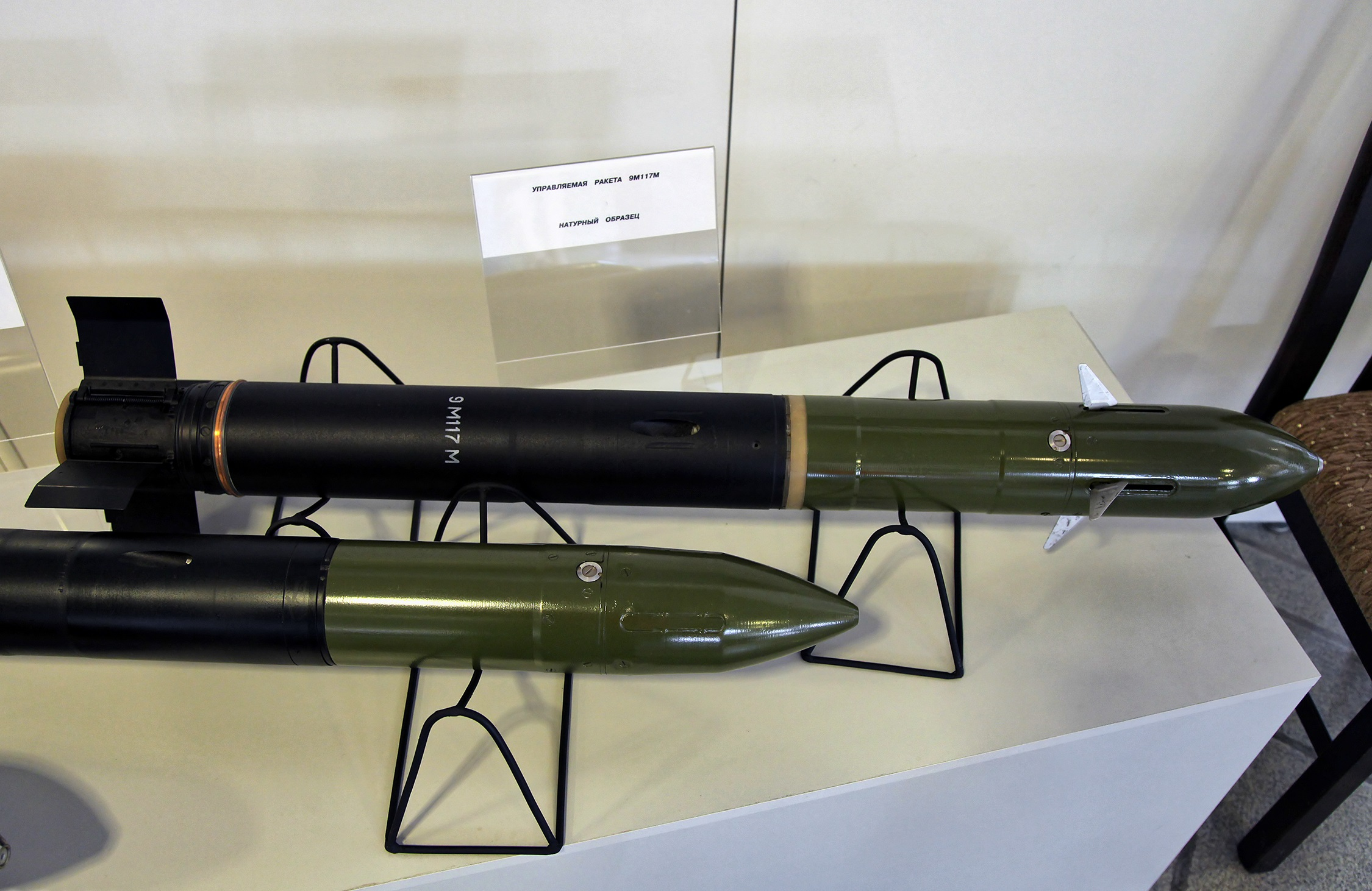
- 9M117M ATGM
- Type: Anti-tank guided missile
- Place of origin: Soviet Union; Russia

Service history
- In service: 1981–present

Production history
- Designer: KBP Instrument Design Bureau

Specifications
- Mass: 17.6 kg (39 lb)
- Length: 1,048 mm (41.3 in)
- Caliber: 100 mm
- Muzzle velocity: 375 m/s (1,230 ft/s) max 300 m/s (980 ft/s) average
- Effective firing range: 100–5,500 m (330–18,040 ft)
- Warhead: HEAT tandem warhead
- Detonation mechanism: Impact
- Guidance system: Laser guidance
- Steering system: SACLOS
- Launch platform: T-12, BMP-3, ZBD-04, T-55, T-62

The 9M117 Bastion is a Soviet laser beam-riding anti-tank missile. It is used in a number of separate weapon systems, including the 9K116-1 Bastion missile system (AT-10 Stabber), 9K118 Sheksna (AT-12 Swinger), T-12 anti-tank gun and the 3UBK12 fired from the BMP-3. The 100 mm projectile entered service in 1981.

== Development ==
The 9K112 Kobra (AT-8 Songster) was the first Soviet tube-fired anti-tank missile to enter service; however, it was only deployed in limited numbers to front line units. Development work began in the late 1970s on a third generation of guided projectiles that would use laser guidance rather than radio command links. The guidance system was developed by Igor Aristarkhov, and the missile was developed by Pyotr Komonov. The Bastion was developed firstly as a relatively cheap missile fired from towed MT-12 100 mm smoothbore anti-tank guns. The 9M117 missile was part of the 3UBK10 round and the whole weapon system was designated 9K116 Kastet. A laser guidance device was seated on a tripod next to the gun. The system was commissioned in 1981.

During development of the 9K116 system, it was recognized that it could enhance the long-range firepower of the older T-55 and T-62 tanks. The system for the T-55's D-10T 100 mm rifled gun was designated 9K116-1 Bastion (3UBK10-1 round); and for the T-62's U-5TS 115 mm smoothbore gun, 9K116-2 Sheksna (3UBK10-2 round). The 9M117 missiles were identical, as in the towed version; however, the 115 mm version had additional guiding rings. They were commissioned in 1983. Then, the 9K116-3 system was developed for the 100 mm rifled gun of the BMP-3 infantry fighting vehicle, commissioned in 1987. Similar systems, with larger caliber 9M119 Svir missiles, were developed for the 125 mm guns of the T-72 and T-80 tanks.

== Description ==
The 100 mm round resembles a normal 100 mm anti-tank round, and is loaded and fired in the same fashion. The round uses a reduced propellant charge to launch the projectile out of the barrel of the gun at around 400–500 m/s (1,300–1,600 ft/s). After leaving the gun barrel, a small cover falls away from the window on the rear of the missile. The rocket motor ignites 1.5 seconds after firing the missile, and it burns for 6 seconds.

The projectiles use beam-riding laser guidance. A cone of laser light divided into sectors is projected from the launching tank/vehicle/gun, each sector having a different frequency or modulation. The missile has a small window in the rear with a laser sensor to detect the modulation of the light. Using this modulation, the missile steers itself, maintaining its position in the cone. The laser beam is zoomed during the missile flight so it has the same diameter (about 6 m (20 ft)) throughout the missile flight path. The laser beam-riding guidance system is smaller than a radio command one, and cheaper and simpler than semi-active laser guidance. The missile is also not prone to radio or optical jamming. On the other hand, the target has to be tracked by laser sight all the time, and the system can not be reliably used on the move.

The missile's flight time to 4,000 metres (13,000 ft) is approximately 12 seconds. After 26 to 41 seconds, the missile self-destructs.

== Variants ==
Cartridges firing the 9M117 Bastion missile; average armour penetration 550 mm (22 in) rolled homogeneous armour equivalency (RHAe) after explosive reactive armour (ERA)

- 100 mm 3UBK10 (MT-12); firing range 100–5,000 m (330–16,400 ft); average armour penetration 550 mm (22 in) RHAe after ERA
- 100 mm 3UBK10-1 (T-55)
- 115 mm 3UBK10-2 (T-62)
- 100 mm 3UBK10-3 (BMP-3 and BMD-4); firing range 100–4,000 m (330–13,120 ft); average armour penetration 550 mm (22 in) RHAe after ERA

Cartridges firing the 9M117M Kan tandem-charge high-explosive anti-tank (HEAT) missile; average armour penetration 600 mm (24 in) RHAe after ERA

- 100 mm 3UBK10M (MT-12)
- 100 mm 3UBK10M-1 (T-55)
- 115 mm 3UBK10M-2 (T-62)
- 100 mm 3UBK10M-3 (BMP-3 and BMD-4); firing range 100–4,000 m (330–13,120 ft); average armour penetration 600 mm (24 in) RHAe after ERA

Cartridges firing the 9M117M1 Arkan tandem-charge HEAT missile with an extended range of 100–6,000 m (330–19,690 ft); average armour penetration 750 mm (30 in) RHAe after ERA

- 100 mm 3UBK23 (MT-12)
- 100 mm 3UBK23-1 (T-55)
- 115 mm 3UBK23-2 (T-62); average armour penetration 850 mm (33 in) RHAe after ERA
- 100 mm 3UBK23-3 (BMP-3 and BMD-4); firing range 100–5,500 m (330–18,040 ft); average armour penetration 750 mm (30 in) RHAe after ERA

== Users ==
- Russia
- Cyprus

== Sources ==
- Angelskiy, R. (2002). Отечественные противотанковые комплексы: Иллюстрированный справочник [Domestic Anti-Tank Systems: An Illustrated Reference Book]. Voyennaya tekhnika (in Russian). Moscow: AST. ISBN 5-17-011744-2.
