= Stillbrew armour =

Add-on composite armour for the Chieftain main battle tank

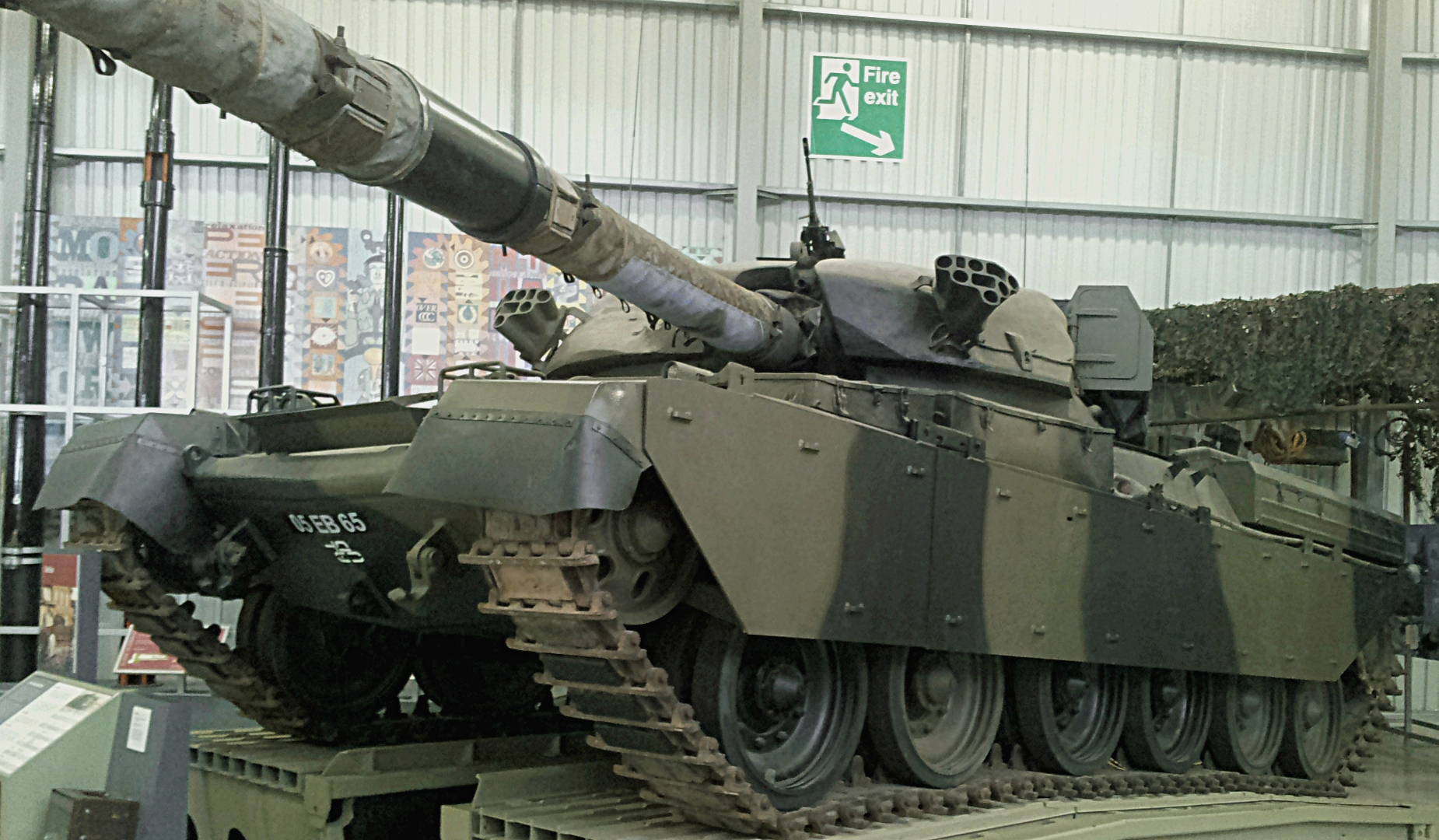
Chieftain Mark 11C at The Tank Museum, Bovington. Stillbrew armour is visible on the turret front.

Stillbrew armour, or more correctly, the Stillbrew Crew Protection Package (SCPP) was an add-on passive composite armour applied to the FV4201 Chieftain main battle tank used by the British Army's Royal Armoured Corps in the mid-1980s and early-1990s so as to provide increased protection from anti-tank warfare weapons. It was named after the two men that invented it, Colonel Still and John Brewer, from the Military Vehicles and Engineering Establishment in Surrey. The tanks to which it was fitted were colloquially referred to as Stillbrew Chieftains.

== History ==
In 1981, during the Iran–Iraq War, Iraqi forces granted access to roughly 190 former Iranian Chieftain tanks to personnel from the British International Military Services including experts from Military Vehicles and Engineering Establishment (MVEE). This led to a forensic examination of the captured Iranian Chieftains supplied by Iraq being undertaken. Around 70% of these tanks were destroyed by 115 mm APFSDS rounds fired from T-62 tanks, while others were destroyed by RPG-7 rockets, AT-3 Sagger and BGM-71 TOW ATGMs, and 100 mm APHE rounds fired from T-55 tanks.

Of the 88 Chieftain tanks hit by 115 mm APFSDS rounds, 71 were penetrated, with some being penetrated even in the most heavily armoured sections of the turret. British sources estimated that Soviet steel-cored 115 mm APFSDS rounds could penetrate 272 mm of RHA, while the larger 125 mm variant could defeat 420 mm of RHA. Tungsten-cored APFSDS rounds were estimated to penetrate 360 mm and 475 mm of RHA for the 115 mm and 125 mm versions respectively. In comparison, the front of the Chieftain's cast turret had a maximum armour thickness of 280 mm and a minimum thickness of only 240 mm.

The British assessment of these vehicles concluded that, although the front of the Chieftain's hull and turret were originally designed to provide protection against armour-piercing ammunition from the Soviet 100 mm main gun fitted to older Soviet tanks such as the T-54 and T-55, they offered inadequate protection against armour-piercing fin-stabilized discarding sabot (APFSDS) and fin-stabilised high-explosive anti-tank (HEAT) ammunition from the T-62's larger 115 mm main gun, nor against other similar current or near-future tank ammunition.

Subsequently, in December 1981, a project was initiated to up-armour the front of the Chieftain turret. This led to the development of Stillbrew armour, initially known as Chieftain Additional Armour (CAA), which was approved as an Operational Emergency (OE) General Staff Requirement (GSR) in May 1984.

While not officially a requirement, when the Chieftain Additional Armour was trialled in 1983 by the MVEE, the up-armoured Chieftain also showed enhanced protection against tank-fired HEAT shells. Three up-armoured turrets were subjected to firing trials at Kirkcudbright in 1985, during which they stopped British 105 mm and 120 mm APFSDS rounds. The weaker 105 mm APFSDS round was stopped at point-blank range, whereas the more powerful 120 mm APFSDS could only be stopped at 1,000 meters distance. In June 1985, the design was finalized and Royal Ordnance Factories Leeds was ordered to produce a first batch of 250 CAA kits, followed by further orders.

== Design ==
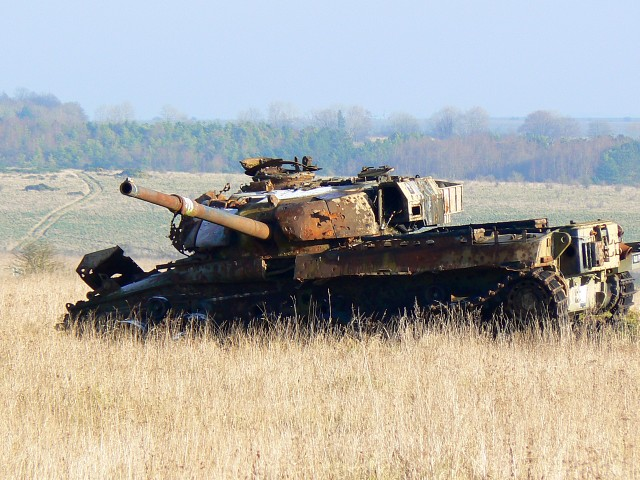
The individual Stillbrew armour panels are visible on this Chieftain tank used as a range target

Stillbrew armour is a passive (i.e. non-reactive) appliqué armour designed to provide increased protection against 115 mm and steel-cored 125 mm APFSDS penetrators.

On the Chieftain tank, Stillbrew armour takes the form of five large panels that cover the front of the turret, as well as two further panels that cover the uppermost section of the frontal hull. This configuration effectively protects the lower section of the turret front, which could not be covered directly by the new armour panels.

The large Stillbrew panels consist of cast RARDE 823 armour steel mounted on studs to the turret face. To prevent the studs from breaking upon impact, a thick dampener made from multiple laminated rubber mats is installed between the base turret and the add-on modules, allowing each of the panels to take at least two hits before being torn off the turret. The whole assembly is covered with cosmetic steel plates. Stillbrew armour is significantly less complex and cheaper than fitting the Chieftain with a new turret featuring Chobham armour, which had been considered a better solution but was not feasible due to time and cost constraints.

Stillbrew armour adds about 2.25 tonnes (2.21 long tons; 2.48 short tons) of weight of the Chieftain tank. Due to the complex shape of the turret, the desired armour thickness of 500 mm (including the rubber dampener) could not be achieved; instead the armour thickness varies between 480 and 540 mm.

== Operational history ==
Testing of the prototype armour began in 1984, with firing and mobility trials being conducted until 1985. The design was deemed successful with no changes needed. Production of the armour began in 1985 at the Royal Ordnance Factory Leeds (ROF Leeds) and fitting began in 1986. Vehicles located in the UK were fitted with the armour package by the Royal Electrical and Mechanical Engineers (REME) in base workshops across the country, while those vehicles deployed to West Germany were fitted at 23 REME Base Workshop in Wetter in the Ruhr.

The armour was first fitted to the Mark 10 Chieftain in 1986, and was also later fitted to the Marks 11 and 12. It was also due to be fitted to the Mark 13, which was to be the final model Chieftain, but this variant was cancelled with the introduction of the Challenger 1.

No other armoured fighting vehicles nor Chieftains sold to foreign armies (including exports of the Mark 10A), were fitted with Stillbrew armour.
