= Leopard tank =

Leopard tank may refer to one of four tanks:

- VK 1602 Leopard, a German experimental tank developed in 1942 that never entered mass production
- Leopard 1, a German tank introduced in 1965
- Leopard 2, a German tank introduced in 1979, successor to the Leopard 1
  - Leopard 2E, a Spanish version of the Leopard 2
