= M48 Patton =

Cold War-era American medium tank

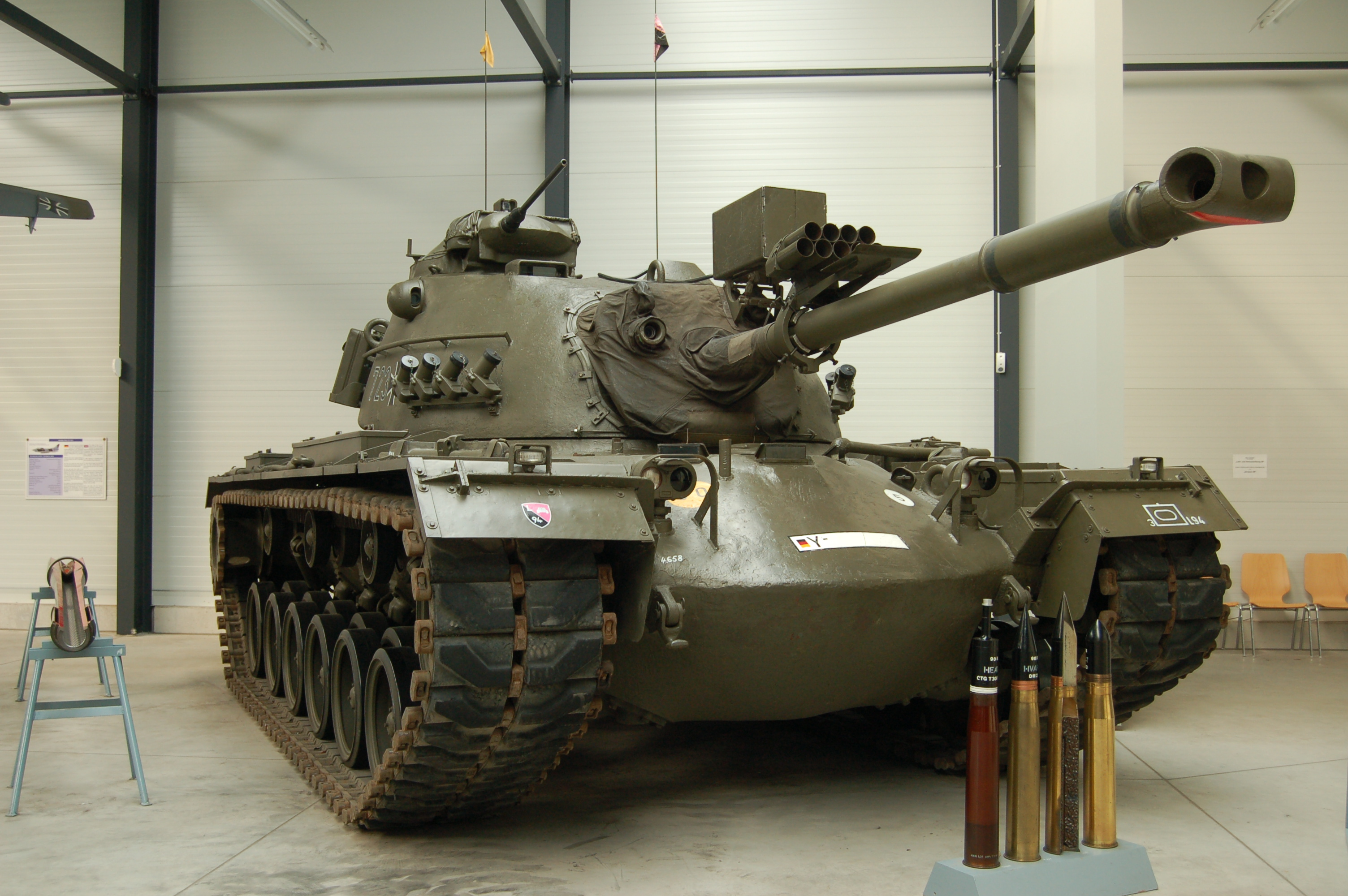
- M48A2C Patton at the Deutsches Panzermuseum Munster
- Type: Medium tank
- Place of origin: United States

Service history
- In service: 1952–present; United States Army (historical) 1952–1987; United States Marine Corps (historical) 1954–1973
- Used by: See Operators
- Wars: Cold War; 1958 Lebanon crisis; Portuguese Colonial War; Vietnam War; Dominican Civil War; Cambodian Civil War; Six-Day War; Indo-Pakistani War of 1965; Indo-Pakistani War of 1971; Yom Kippur War; Turkish invasion of Cyprus; Western Sahara War; Lebanese Civil War; Sino-Vietnamese War; Iran–Iraq War; Battle of Mogadishu (1993); Kurdish–Turkish conflict; 2007 Lebanon conflict; 2025 Cambodia‒Thailand conflict

Production history
- Designer: Chrysler Defense Engineering
- Designed: 1950
- Manufacturer: Chrysler, Fisher Body, Ford Motor Company, American Locomotive Company
- Developed from: M47 Patton
- Developed into: M60 tank
- Unit cost: M48A3 US$309,090 (equivalent to $3,330,118 in 2025) (1981)
- Produced: M48/M48A1 1952–1956 M48A2 1955–1957 M48A3 1957–1961
- No. built: 12,000 (all variants)
- Variants: See Variants

Specifications
- Mass: M48 49.6 short tons (44.3 long tons; 45.0 t)
- Length: 9.3 m (30 ft 6 in)
- Width: 3.65 m (12 ft 0 in)
- Height: 3.1 m (10 ft 2 in)
- Crew: Four: Commander; Gunner; Loader; Driver
- Armor: Upper glacis 110 mm (4.3 in) at 60° 220 mm (8.7 in) LoS Turret front 178 mm (7.0 in) at 0°
- Main armament: M48–M48A3 90mm M41/T139 gun M48A5 105 mm M68/T254E2 gun
- Secondary armament: M48.50 cal (12.7 mm) on M1 mount M48A1/A2/A3/A5.50 cal (12.7 mm) in M1 commander's cupola M48/A1/A2/A3 M37/T153 machine gun M48A5 M219 (7.62mm NATO)
- Engine: M48/M48A1 Continental AV1790 V12, air-cooled, gasoline engine 810 hp (600 kW) M48A2 Continental AV1790 fuel-injected, V12, gasoline engine 825 hp (615 kW) (Note: These AVI engines used a light blended gasoline (MOGAS) with a low-pressure (20 psi (140 kPa)) fuel-injection system and were rated at 810 hp (600 kW). No gasoline engines with the AVSI designation (air-cooled, V12, Supercharged, Fuel Injected) were used in the combat tanks. This engine designation was only found in the M88 ARV and was rated at 1,050 hp (780 kW) at 2800 RPM.) M48A3–M48A5 Continental AVDS-1790 V12, air-cooled, twin-turbo, diesel engine 750 hp (560 kW)
- Power/weight: 16.6 hp (12.4 kW)/tonne
- Transmission: Allison CD-850-4A or CD-850-4B: Two forward ranges; One reverse
- Suspension: Torsion bar suspension
- Ground clearance: 16 in (0.41 m)
- Fuel capacity: M48 200 US gal (760 L) M48A1 200 US gal internal 420 US gal (1,600 L)(with external fuel drums) M48A2 335 US gal (1,270 L) M48A3/A5 300 US gal (1,100 L)
- Operational range: M48 113 km (70 mi) M48A1 217 km (135 mi) with external fuel drums M48A2 177.8 km (110.5 mi) M48A3 463 km (288 mi) M48A5 499 km (310 mi)
- Maximum speed: M48A5 30 mph (48 km/h)

The M48 Patton is an American first-generation main battle tank (MBT) introduced in February 1952, being designated as the 90mm Gun M48, armored, full-tracked, combat vehicle of the medium-gun tank class. It was designed as a replacement for the M26 Pershing, M4 Sherman, M46 and M47 Patton tanks, and was the main battle tank of the US Army and US Marine Corps in the Vietnam War. Nearly 12,000 M48s were built, mainly by Chrysler and American Locomotive Company, from 1952 to 1961. The M48 Patton was the first US medium gun tank with a four-man crew, featuring a centerline driver's compartment and no bow machine gunner. As with nearly all new armored vehicles it had a wide variety of suspension systems, cupola styles, power packs, fenders and other details among individual tanks.

The early designs, up to the M48A2C, were powered by a gasoline engine. The M48A3 and A5 versions used a diesel engine. However, gasoline engine versions were still in use in the US Army National Guard through 1968 and by many West German Army units through 1975. Numerous examples of the M48 saw combat in various Arab–Israeli conflicts and the Vietnam War. Beginning in 1959, most American M48A1s and M48A2s were upgraded to the M48A3 model.

The M48 Patton-series saw widespread service with the United States and NATO until it was superseded by the M60 tank. It was widely exported. The tank's hull also became the basis for a wide variety of experimental, utility and support vehicles such as armored recovery vehicles and bridge layers. Some M48A5 models served into the mid-1980s with US Army National Guard units, and M48A3s were used as targets for weapons and radar testing into the mid-1990s.

Many M48s remain in service in countries other than the US. Most of these have been modified and their firepower, mobility and protection upgraded to increase their combat effectiveness on the modern battlefield. As of 2015, Turkey is the largest operator with over 750 units in service, Taiwan is second with approximately 500 upgraded variants, and Greece is third with 390 in service.

== History ==
After the conclusion of World War II, the United States Ordnance Tank-Automotive Command (OTAC) drastically slowed or canceled many tank development and design programs. On 7 November 1950, the Ordnance Technical Committee mandated a change in the nomenclature for tanks in the US military. It was decided that weight designations (Light, Medium, Heavy) were no longer applicable due to changes in the way tanks were developed and employed on the battlefield, and the varying calibers of main guns now available. Thus the caliber of the gun replaced its weight designation. For example, the M103 Heavy Tank was redesignated as the 120 mm Gun Tank M103 and the Light Tank M41 Walker Bulldog as the 76 mm Gun Tank M41 Walker Bulldog.

The M47 Patton entered production in 1951 and was used by the United States Army and Marine Corps but ongoing technical and production problems kept it from serving in the Korean War. This forced the US to field older tank models, such as the M26 Pershing and M46 Patton. In response, the Army launched several design projects for a replacement of the M46 and M26. The United States entered a period of frenzied activity during the crisis atmosphere of the Korean War, when the US seemed to lag behind the Soviet Union in terms of tank quality and quantity.

Testing and development cycles occurred simultaneously with production to ensure speedy delivery of new tanks. Such rapid production caused problems but the importance given to rapidly equipping combat units with new tanks precluded detailed testing and evaluation prior to its quantity production. Notable among these were the T42, T69 and T48 projects as well as continuing to pursue further improvements to the M47.

Compromise was inevitable, but not always welcomed, as General Bruce C. Clarke ironically observed: "We know exactly what we want. We want a fast, highly mobile, fully armored, lightweight vehicle. It must be able to swim, cross any terrain, and climb 30 degree hills. It must be air-transportable. It must have a simple but powerful engine, requiring little or no maintenance. The operating range should be several hundred miles. We would also like it to be invisible".

=== T48 project ===
The T48 project was to focus on improving the turret of the M47 Patton and upgrading performance with a more powerful yet more efficient gasoline engine. 1/4 and 1/8 scale design mockups of the turret were constructed during May 1950 using the T119 90mm main gun of the M47 Patton. The design study was accepted by the Army in December and a contract for the advanced production design and engineering (APE) of a 90mm armed tank was awarded to the Chrysler Defense.

Hull redesign included moving the driver's station to the front center and removal of the bow-mounted machine gun and its associated crew station, which was converted to safe container storage for additional main gun ammunition. The front glacis was sloped to offer much better ballistic protection than former welded and rather flat designs. An aircraft style steering wheel (a yoke) replaced lever steering. The power pack consisted of the Continental AV-1790-5B gasoline engine producing 704 brake horsepower coupled to an Allison CD-850-4A cross-drive transmission with 2 forward and 1 reverse ranges. The hull armor was increased to 4 in (100 mm) on the front glacis of rolled homogeneous steel. It had six roadwheel pairs per side and five return rollers, a torsion bar suspension system, and used T97E2 steel tracks. A new hemisphere-shaped turret eliminated the M47s noted shot traps and lowered the vehicle's height.

T48 pilot No. 1 was constructed by Chrysler Engineering to begin testing at the OTAC Detroit Arsenal Test Center in December 1951. Six prototypes were built in all.

On 27 February 1951, shortly after the outbreak of the Korean War, the Ordnance Technical Committee Minutes (OTCM) #33791 initiated the simultaneous production and design refinement of the new tank, designating the production tanks as the 90mm Gun Tank M48. The Army planned to produce some 9,000 M48s within three years of development. Chrysler Corporation became the principal producer of the tank. Expected production and teething troubles led to the creation of integrating committees to coordinate tank and component development. These Army Combat Vehicle (ARCOVE) committees included military and industrial representatives who provided early warning of defects and recommended remedies.

Testing trials of the T48 tanks began in February 1952 and continued until the end of 1955. However, the perceived immediate threat of Soviet aggression in Western Europe and the ongoing Korean War impelled Army senior leadership to rush the T48 tank into series production before the inevitable bugs could be worked out of the new tank design. Instead, it was decided that any needed design changes uncovered by the continued testing and evaluation of the T48 tanks at the OTAC Detroit Arsenal Test Center would be incorporated into the M48 series production vehicles as quickly as possible.

T48 pilot No. 1 was designed and constructed by Chrysler Engineering to begin the APE design development at the OTAC Detroit Arsenal Test Center in December 1951. This tank was provisionally armed with the M36/T119 gun using a Y-shaped deflector and a muzzle brake. This gun was not used for production M48 tanks. It used the Mod A hull and turret designs with smaller diameter crew hatches. The driver's hatch incorporated a mechanism that dropped his three periscope heads to provide clearance for the hatch door as it swung to the right, and the driver then had to reposition the periscopes by hand once the hatch was closed again. It had 5 return rollers, 6 roadwheel pairs per side with the drive sprocket at the rear and a torsion bar suspension system.

Pilot No. 2 was built in February 1952 and also used the early Mod A design with small hatches. It was fitted with the T139/M41 90mm gun replacing the muzzle brake with a cylindrical blast deflector. A T-shaped deflector was used for production M48 tanks. This vehicle had two machine guns installed, a .30cal M1919E4 mounted coaxially to the left of the main gun and a .50cal M2HB mounted on the commander's cupola. The full image stereoscopic T46E1/M12 rangefinder was placed in the central section of the turret.

Pilot No. 3 was constructed in November 1952 and used the Mod B hull and turret designs with a simplified, larger diameter hatch that was easier for the driver to operate. Also the front vision block was removable and allowed for the future use of IR vision blocks by the driver. It also had 5 return rollers, 6 roadwheel pairs per side with the drive sprocket at the rear and a torsion bar suspension system. The Mod B turret also had larger hatches for the commander and loader. An additional three hulls were constructed (T48 pilots 4 through 6) in 1953. These tanks were used into 1955 for the component development of the M48A2 production tanks including fire control systems, turret cupolas, suspension configurations and powerpacks. At least one of these hulls was fitted with experimental silica glass composite armor panels.

=== Components ===
==== Armor ====
In conjunction with the development of the T48 project there was some discussion regarding armor. The weight of conventional armored steel needed to provide protection against the emerging large-caliber high-velocity main guns and improved APDS kinetic energy penetrators was making its continued use impractical. Composite applique armor panels made with fused silica glass was envisioned to be fitted to the hull. It was also desired that a turret be constructed using this special armor. The OTAC and Carnegie Institute of Technology began development of the armor in November 1952 at Fort Belvoir VA as Project TT2-782/51. This composite armor offered protection against HEAT, HESH, and HE rounds. Its overall slow development limited its use to the T48 and was dropped from consideration in the M48 by 1953, however its development was continued with the T95 Medium Tank until 1958.

There were two different hulls used for the M48 series. The M48 hull had a wedge-shaped front glacis compared to the M46's rather flat design. Early Mod A hulls had smaller diameter driver's hatches. The suspension consisted of six roadwheel pairs per side with a torsion bar suspension system and five return rollers. The engine exhaust vents were located on the top of the rear deck. There was a dual compensating idler arm at the front, and dual auxiliary track tension wheels behind the last road wheels, using the T97E2 track assembly. The drive sprocket was located at the rear of the hull. Shock absorbers were mounted at the first two and last roadwheel arms. This hull design was manufactured for the original M48 and M48A1 versions of the M48 series. Many Mod B hull designs used for the M48A1 (T48 Pilot #3) were further upgraded to the A2 hull design standard but retained their original 5 return roller configuration.

The M48A2 hull design saw several modifications including a reduction from five to three return rollers per side. The suspension system was simplified, a more compact powerpack compartment and additional fuel cells, with large louvered grill access doors replaced the complicated grill work of the rear engine decks of the M48/M48A1 hull designs. This hull was used on newly constructed M48A2 and M48A3 tanks of the M48 series.

The turret used for the M48 series was hemispherical in shape and was made from cast homogeneous steel. It had a flat gun shield and a standard pop-up styled hatch for the commander and an additional hatch for the loader's station. Early production Mod A models of the turret had somewhat smaller diameter hatches. The gunner was provided with an M37 .30 cal machine gun with 5,900 rounds of ammunition.

==== Rangefinders and fire control systems ====
During WWII and the Korean War, most tanks used a direct sighting system where the gun sights and rangefinders were slaved directly to the gun's barrel but its long range accuracy depended upon the focusing abilities of the individual gunner. There are two basic types of optical rangefinders, stereoscopic and coincidence. With a stereoscopic model range determination occurred by measuring the distance from the observer to a target using the observer's capability of binocular vision. The coincidence rangefinder uses a single eyepiece. Light from the target enters the rangefinder through two windows located at either end of the instrument. The ARCOVE emphasis upon increased long range accuracy led to the incorporation of a fire control system (FCS) in the M48.

The fire control system included a rangefinder, mechanical ballistic computer, ballistic drive, and gunner's sight. Collectively, these mechanical devices resembled in miniature the fire control systems used in naval gunnery. Only after the Second World War did such systems become small enough for use in combat vehicles. These mechanical fire control systems permitted tanks to engage effectively at much longer ranges than in World War II, a critical consideration for the Army, expecting to enter the European battlefield outnumbered. Instead of a gunner's sight being slaved to the gun tube, the ballistic computer and drive computed the range and elevated the gun. The gunner's primary responsibility lay in keeping the sight on the target. The mechanical ballistic computer made a more accurate computation of range possible by mathematically accounting for such factors as vehicle cant and ammunition type. Many developmental range finders based on pulses of IR light, such as the Optical Tracking, Acquisition and Ranging (OPTAR) rangefinder of the T95 continued into 1957.

==== Autoloader systems ====
Another requirement of the T48 project was to explore the use of autoloaders for the main gun as they became available. Preliminary experiments with a loading system using the T48 turret were unsuccessful due to the limited space and the need to line up the breech with the loading system after each firing. It also was dropped from consideration for use on the M48 but was further developed on the T69 tank as the 90 mm T178 gun. It was fitted with an eight-round auto-loader system mounted in an oscillating turret.

==== 90 mm main gun ====
ARCOVE also involved the Ordnance Department with the goal of improving the 90 mm gun and its ammunition. The Army expected difficulties in engagements with the Soviet IS-3 heavy tank, since the M47's M36/T119 90 mm rifled main gun could not consistently penetrate its frontal armor, even with special armor-piercing capped (APC) or HEAT ammunition. Work was performed to address this by developing the improved T300E53 HEAT ammunition and the T137 series of hypervelocity armor-piercing discarding-sabot (HVAP-DS or simply APDS) ammunition for the M36 gun. The new APDS round could penetrate 11.1 in (280 mm) of homogeneous steel armor, angled at 30 degrees, at a distance of 1,000 yd (910 m), but was not accepted for service.

Instead it was decided to use an improved version of the 90 mm gun, the T139 for the M48 production tanks. It allowed for easier barrel changing and weighed less than the preceding M36/T119 gun. It was later standardized as the 90mm Gun M41 in February 1951.

==== Turret cupolas ====
The T48 and M48(Mod A) tanks featured a remote controllable machine gun mount as the tank commander's weapon on a pedestal, which allowed him to fire the .50 caliber (12.7 mm) M2HB machine gun from within the vehicle's turret. It used a 100-round ammunition box and could also be employed manually by the commander. However, servicing and reloading of the weapon required the tank commander to open his roof hatch and expose his head and upper torso. This remote-controllable mount was designated as the .50 Caliber Machine Gun Mount, M1 and designed by Chrysler Defense Engineering.

By October 1954, the Army decided to amend the design of the tank by installing a cupola. During the production of M48s it was modified several times resulting in a wide mix of cupola styles among individual tanks. Afterwards it was renamed as the Cupola, Tank Commander's Caliber .50 Machine Gun, M1. The new tank commander cupola would allow the tank commander to aim and fire his weapon while remaining under armor protection via a remote controlled M2HB machine gun, however the commander had to open the cupola hatch and expose his head to reload or service the machine gun due to the limited headroom. These cupolas had a small rearward opening hatch and a single, non-removable vision block. They were designed by Aircraft Armaments Incorporated. Because of its smaller turret roof hatch opening those M1 cupolas retro-fitted to early production M48 Mod A turrets used an adaptor ring.

The M1E1 cupola design used a G305 cupola riser with 9 non-removable vision blocks installed (some versions had 7 with the 2 rear blocks deleted) between the turret roof and the cupola. It also came with a new bulged hatch cover to provide the tank commander with more headroom and allowed him to reload the weapon while remaining under armor protection. A major drawback of both these cupolas was their inability to mount either daylight or infrared vision devices. The receiver of the M2HB took up a great deal of space in the already cramped cupola's interior. Also due to restraints in the cupola, smaller 50 round ammunition boxes were used. Development of its eventual replacement, the T9/M19 cupola of the XM60 tank was continued into 1958 and some M19 cupolas were retro-fitted to M48A5s to allow for the use of IR and daylight periscopes by the commander.

=== M48 ===
"Land Battleship: M48" (1952) - Official US Army promotional film.

Chrysler began building the Newark Tank Plant in Newark, Delaware, in March 1951 to produce the M48 while Chrysler Defense Engineering and ARCOVE continued advanced production engineering (APE) to evolve the design using the T48 prototypes at the OTAC Detroit Arsenal. In May 1952 Chrysler agreed to take control of a Government-Owned and Contractor Operated (GOCO) basis of the Newark Tank plant production facility with the US Government and continue production design refinement of the T48 at the OTAC Detroit Arsenal. To meet the urgent need for tanks, production contracts were also awarded to General Motors Fisher Body Division (Grand Blanc Tank Plant) and Ford Motor Company (Livonia Tank Plant) to produce the tank in Michigan starting in April 1952. Also in July 1952 the Army awarded American Locomotive Company a $200 million contract to start producing the tank in 1953 at the Schenectady Tank Plant in New York. All four companies were given initial production contracts in that same year for around 400 tanks each. The first production tank was unveiled on 1 July 1952 as the 90mm Gun Tank M48 and christened the M48 Patton by Mrs. Beatrice Ayer Patton, widow of the late General George S. Patton.

The M48 featured a gasoline-powered engine, different models were used depending on availability and manufacturer. Originally the M48 (Mod A) that was built by Chrysler Defense at the OTAC Test Center (T48 Pilot #1) in 1951 used the Continental AV-1790-5B coupled to a General Motors CD-850-4A cross-drive transmission as used for the M47. The M48s built by American Locomotive used a Continental AV-1790-5C gasoline engine and either an Allison CD-850-4A or 4B cross-drive transmission. Additionally a two-cylinder, gasoline, air-cooled engine (sometimes referred to as the "Little Joe" by tank crews) was provided to power a 28 volt, 300 ampere generator when the main engine was not needed.

Fuel capacity was 200 US gal (760 L) providing a cruising range of about 70 mi (110 km). The suspension consisted of six roadwheel pairs with a torsion bar suspension system and five return rollers. There was a dual compensating idler arm at the front, and dual auxiliary track tension wheels behind the last road wheels, as had the preceding M46 and M47 tanks. The M48 used the new 28 in (0.71 m) wide T97E2 track assembly.

It had hydraulic shock absorbers mounted on the first, second and sixth roadwheel pairs (opposite of the M46 and M47). The bow mounted machine gun and its related crew station was eliminated thus providing more ammunition storage for the main gun. The driver's station was moved to the front center of the hull. The steering controls were redesigned. A large aircraft-styled steering wheel (replacing the wobble stick control of the M46 and M47) and placing the transmission range selector on the floor to the driver's right.

Mod A hulls had a small oval overhead hatch for the driver. T48 Pilots No. 1 and 2 incorporated a mechanism that dropped the three periscope heads to provide clearance for the hatch door as it swung to the right, and the driver then had to reposition the periscopes by hand once the hatch was closed again. The vehicle did not have an NBC protection system for the crew and a fording depth of approximately 1.2 m (3.9 ft). It had a crew of 4; the commander, gunner and loader were positioned in the turret and the driver stationed in the front center of the hull.

The M48's turret consisted of a redesigned flat gun shield and standard pop-up hatch for the commander's station. The M48 Mod A turret design had smaller roof hatches for both the commander and loader. A .50 cal M2HB using a M1 remote control mount on a pedestal was available for the commander. When not in use, the machine gun mount could be stowed on a bracket welded to the turret roof in front of the loader. The M48's direct fire control system consisted of an M12/T41 stereoscopic rangefinder with a field of view of 5 degrees and magnification of x7.5, an azimuth indicator, an M20 gunner's periscope and a T13 super elevation actuator. Two main bearings are bolted to the mounting plate on the roof of the tank turret to support the range finder on steel radial ball bearings. A parallel gun linkage between the gun trunnion and the range finder assures that the line of sight of the range finder reproduces the exact motion of the gun in elevation.

A .30 caliber M1919E4 machine gun was coaxially mounted to the main gun's left and was operated by the gunner. An M12 full field optical range finder was used, the same as the M47. The tank was not fitted with any night fighting or computerized fire control systems. Some early production M48s used a Y-shaped blast deflector on the barrel and carried 53 rounds. Eight ready rounds were stored in the left side of the turret bustle for the loader, the rest were stored inside safe containers in the hull. Tank crews complained that the Y-shaped fume extractor was found to be prone to snagging brush. It was replaced with a T-shaped model early in production.

These early M48 tanks suffered from engine, transmission, track, and suspension problems. The first production vehicles suffered from excessive oil consumption and engine failures after only 1,000 mi (1,600 km). The gasoline engine managed only 0.33 mpg US (0.14 km/L), limiting range to 75 miles (121 km). The M12/T41 rangefinder was too fragile and often broke. Army Field Forces (AFF) found these tanks to be unsuitable for combat use in Europe and was regulated to limited use by US Army CONUS units until numerous shortcomings were corrected. Furthermore, some 120 hulls were found to have insufficient hull armor protection. These were denoted as the M48C and relegated by the Continental Army Command (CONARC) for non-ballistic training use by the Armor School at Fort Knox to train crewmembers and maintenance personnel.

=== M48A1 ===
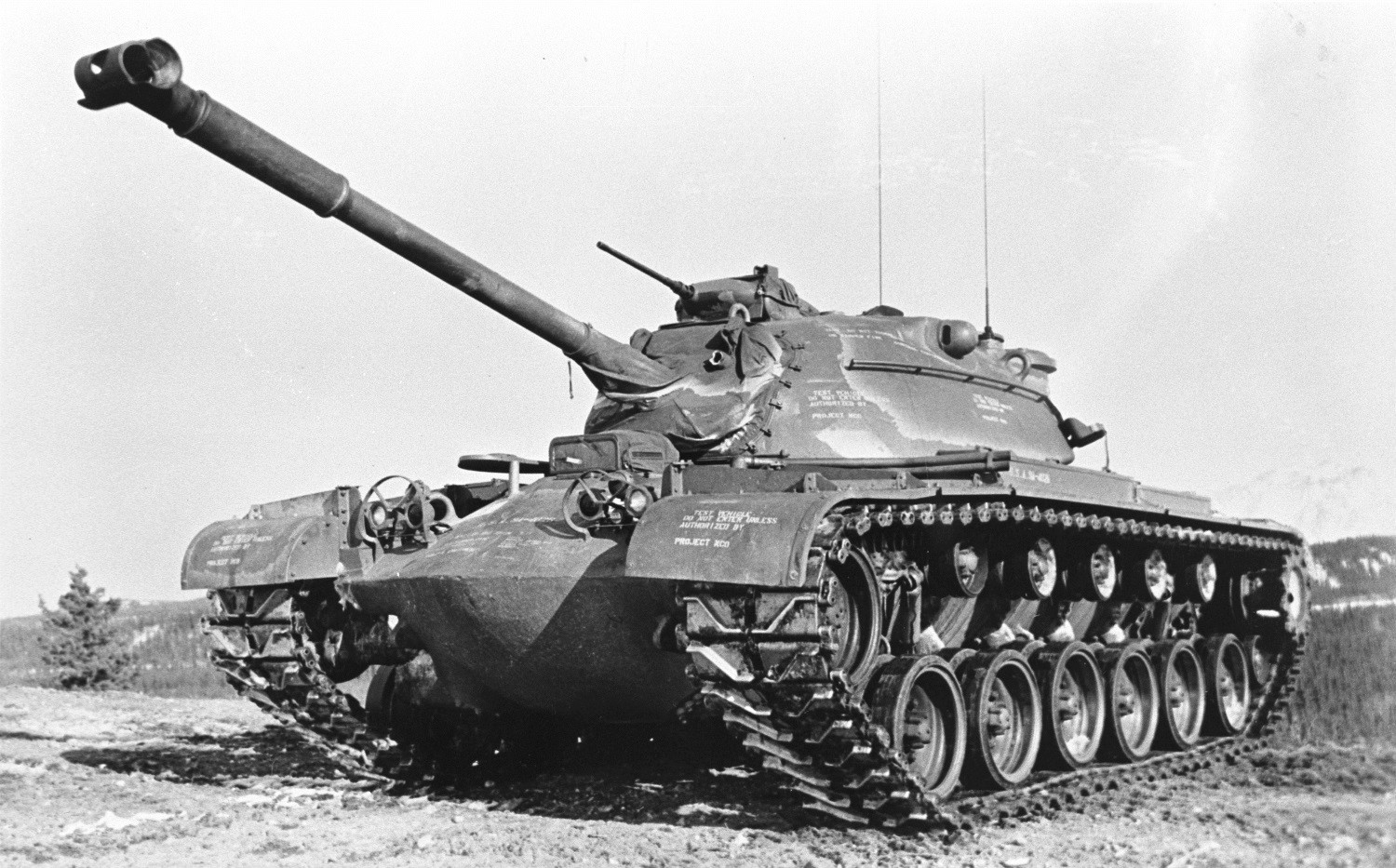
Late series M48A1 during cold weather tests at Fort Greely, Alaska, 1955. The main gun is equipped with a T-shaped blast deflector on the muzzle and the driver's station is under a protective cover.

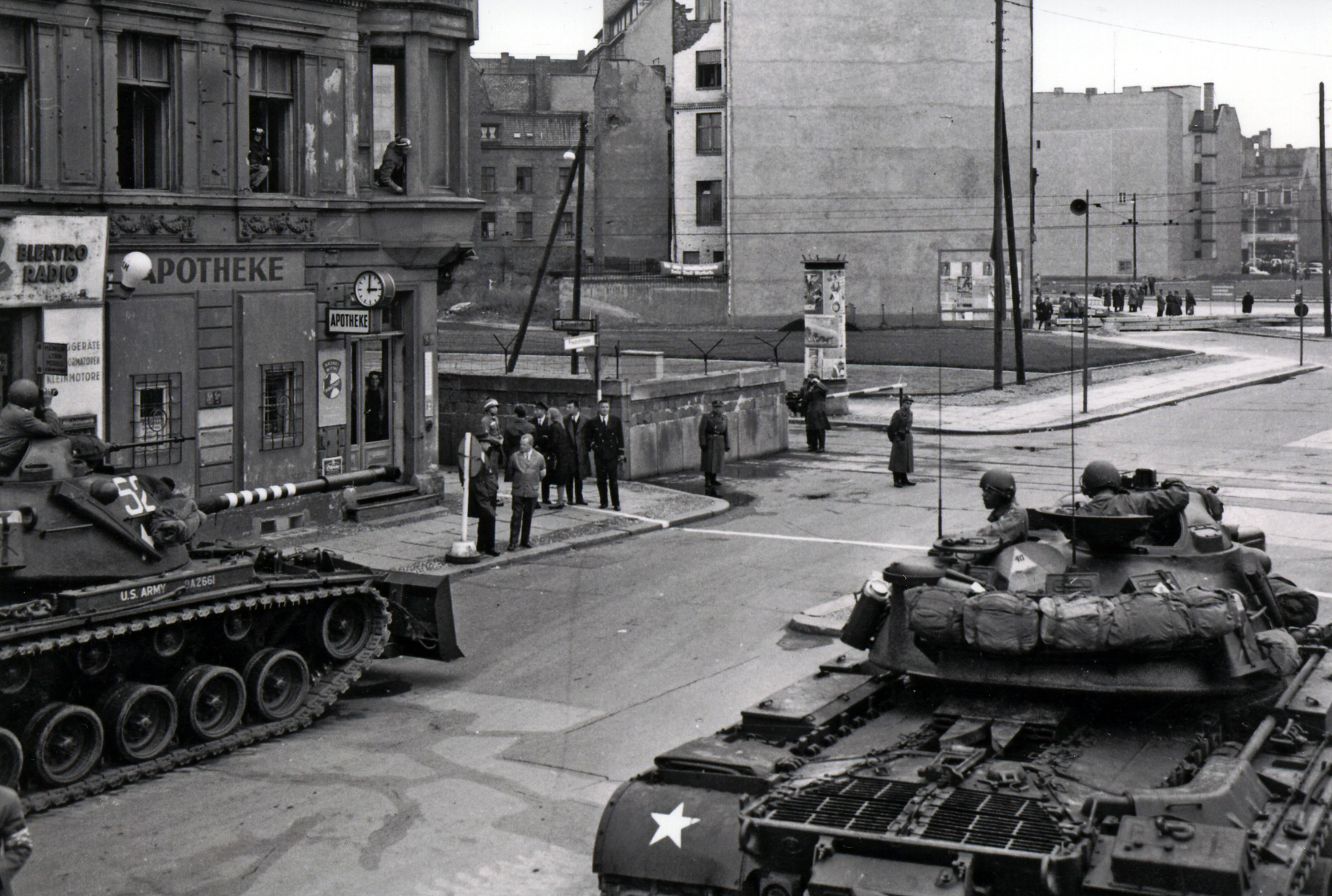
Two US Army M48A1s of F Co., 40th Armor of the Berlin Brigade face off in Berlin against Red Army T-54s during one of several standoffs at Checkpoint Charlie in 1961.

The Army concluded in January 1952 that the T42 had failed as a tank capable of combat in Europe against Soviet tanks and reached the same conclusion in November 1953 for the M48 Mod A versions. The M48A1 focused on improving the engine and the vehicle's operational range and fixing numerous mechanical problems. To cope with the lack of range, an add-on modification allowed the use of 4 external jettisonable 55 US gal (210 L) fuel drums of MOGAS (motor gasoline) that was mounted to the rear deck, extending the range to 135 mi (217 km). This proved very unpopular with tank crews and operational range remained unsatisfactory.

Further ARCOVE changes included a desire for the commander to observe and operate his weapons station while remaining under armor protection. At this same time the US Army Field Forces (AFF) declared the T42 medium tank unfit for production in November 1952, mainly due to serious shortcomings of its hull design. Ford's production of the M48 ended in August 1953 after a fire destroyed most of the Livonia Tank Plant.

During evaluation by the Army Review Committee on Development of Equipment (ARCOVE), testing on the T48 pilot No. 1 and No. 2 prototypes revealed that the original driver's hatch on the M48 Mod A hull restricted driver comfort and posture when operating the tank with the hatch open. To address this clearance issue, a redesigned, larger driver's hatch was developed and integrated into series production. Also the driver's front vision block was removable and could be replaced with an infrared IR vision block. A redesigned power pack featured an AV-1790-7B gasoline engine and CD-850-4B transmission. The turret was fitted with the M1 cupola that enclosed the M2HB machine gun. Cupolas fitted on those tanks with early production Mod A turrets used an adapter ring. In April 1953, the Army standardized this configuration as the 90mm Gun Tank M48A1 Patton and originally applied this designation to both the early Mod A hull design and the Mod B hulls currently in series production.

Between April 1952 and December 1954, nearly 7,000 M48s and M48A1s were produced, with production contracts for an additional 2,500 tanks to be built through 1956. Army units in Europe immediately received 2,120 of these early M48A1 tanks, but correction of ARCOVE defects discovered after production delayed the fielding of the remaining tanks. The Marines Corps however continued to use the M47 Patton. The M48A1's width proved too wide for many European tunnels, complicating rail transport. Operational readiness rates of M48-equipped units tended to be low. The tanks continued experiencing engine, transmission, track, and suspension problems, and the M12 stereoscopic rangefinder was uncomfortable to operate.

However, the M48A1 was considered an even match for its Soviet counterpart, the T-54 and fielded to combat units in Europe. On 25 October 1954, the Army decided to amend its designation of the M48 tank. Thereafter, the tanks with the original Mod A hull design and the Chrysler-designed M1 remote-control machine gun mount attached to the tank commander's pop-up hatch would remain the 90mm gun tank M48. However, all those tanks with the Mod B hull (some production M48A1 tanks had the Mod B turret) and fitted with the new small turreted M1 cupola armed with a .50 caliber M2HB machine gun would be designated as the 90mm gun tank M48A1. M48A1 tanks with 5 return rollers and the ModB driver's hatch were modified to the M48A2 hull configuration. The hull's armor framing for the engine compartment was modified. In addition detachable headlights, armored boxes around the taillights, newly redesigned mudguards, an updated fuel delivery system and a tank infantry phone were added.

=== M48A2 ===
The concurrent testing of the T48 and production of the M48 was the source of widespread debate among Congressional Budget Oversight committees. The Bureau of the Budget believed that the Army was not progressing with sufficient speed in its tank modernization program and recommended the immediate replacement of the M48A2 as well as better quality control. Under the ARCOVE's "single, efficient producer" model, Defense Secretary Charles Erwin Wilson directed the Army to reduce the number of contractors producing each model of tank. In a new round of production bids for the M48A2, General Motors underbid Chrysler, and in September 1953 Army Secretary Robert T. Stevens awarded GM's Fisher Body division a $200 million contract to become the sole producer of the M48A2 and started production at its Grand Blanc Tank Plant in Michigan in April 1953.

The decision raised skepticism among lawmakers. Senator Estes Kefauver noted the move would effectively leave GM as the only producer of light (the M41 Walker Bulldog) and medium tanks when the Chrysler production contract for M48A1 production was set to expire in April 1956. Months later Chrysler underbid GM in the new round of bidding. In September 1954 the Army awarded Chrysler an exclusive $160.6 million contract to restart production. In November 1955 the Army awarded American Locomotive Company a $73 million contract to begin producing 600 M48A2s the next year at the Schenectady Tank Plant, New York.

However Alco opted to wrap up its tank business when its contract ended in July 1956. In May the Army awarded Chrysler, the only bidder, a $119 million contract to continue production of the M48A2 at the Delaware Tank Plant. In December 1955 Chrysler took on orders initially intended for the American Locomotive after Alco opted production cutbacks to its tank program and became the only manufacturer of the tank by the end of 1956.

During the ARCOVE Questionmark III conference in June 1957 it was predicted that the Congress would not approve the procurement of the M48A2 after the fiscal year 1959. However, the ongoing T95 Tank Program was progressing slowly as its new technologies were being developed. Several ideas were proposed to replace the M48A2. General Bruce C. Clarke wrapped competing and even conflicting desires in irony, observing that "We know exactly what we want. We want a fast, highly mobile, fully armored, lightweight vehicle. It must be able to swim, cross any terrain, and climb 30-degree hills. It must be air-transportable. It must have a simple but powerful engine, requiring little or no maintenance. The operating range should be several hundred miles. We would also like it to be invisible".

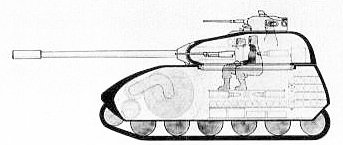
Envelope-stretching nuclear fission powered R-32 tank design proposal

Some ideas proposed were to use a nuclear fission power plant in the R-32 or a vapor-cycled power plant fueled by hydrocarbons in the Chrysler TV-8 tank. In response to these findings an eventual replacement for the M48A2 was recommended. ARCOVE and the Deputy Chief of Staff, Logistics (DCSLOG) submitted a proposal for a tank based on the M48A2 featuring improved firepower and a compression ignition engine and started the design development of the XM60 in September 1957.

The engine deck was redesigned with two large louvered doors that replaced the complicated grill work of the rear engine decks of the M48/M48A1 hull designs. This new rear hull arrangement on the M48A2 tank helped in cooling the engine and minimizing the infrared (heat) signature of the vehicle. The suspension system was simplified. The track tensioner arm was eliminated, modifications to the idler arm, the addition of bumper springs and friction snubbers, and a relocation of the air cleaner assembly. The number of return rollers was reduced to 3 per side. With the more compact AVI-1790-8 engine, additional fuel tanks were installed in the engine compartment, increasing fuel capacity to 335 gallons. Many older model M48A1s were rebuilt to this production configuration but retained their original 5 return rollers per side.

The M48A2C saw improvements for the turret implementing the Mod B turret design with larger hatches for the commander and loader. The M12 rangefinder was replaced with a full-field coincidence model along with an improved turret control system. The M13 Fire Control System (FCS) consists of the M5A2 ballistic drive and mechanical M13A3 gun data computer which integrated barrel temperature data with an M17 coincidence range finder. The rangefinder is a double image coincidence image instrument used as the ranging device of the gunner's primary direct sighting and fire control system. The gunner is provided with an M20 day periscope with a magnification of x8 and an M105D day telescopic sight with a magnification of x8 and a field of view of 7.5 degrees.

Range information from the rangefinder is fed into the ballistic computer through a shaft. The ballistic computer is a mechanically driven unit that permits ammunition selection, range correction, and superelevation correction by the gunner. The ballistic drive receives the range input and, through the use of cams and gears, provides superelevation information to the superelevation actuator. The superelevation actuator adds sufficient hydraulic fluid to the elevating mechanism to correctly position the gun.

M48A2s were widely deployed to both the US Army and US Marine Corps fully replacing the M47 Patton in combat units as well as being exported to NATO allies and foreign governments. In 1967 M48A2 tanks still in service with National Guard units were upgraded to the A3 configuration. The M48A2 hull received modified armored boxing around the taillights, an updated fuel delivery system and a tank infantry phone (TIP). The gasoline engine was replaced with the AVDS-1790-2A. They remained in CONUS training use with the Army National Guard through 1979.

=== M48A3 ===
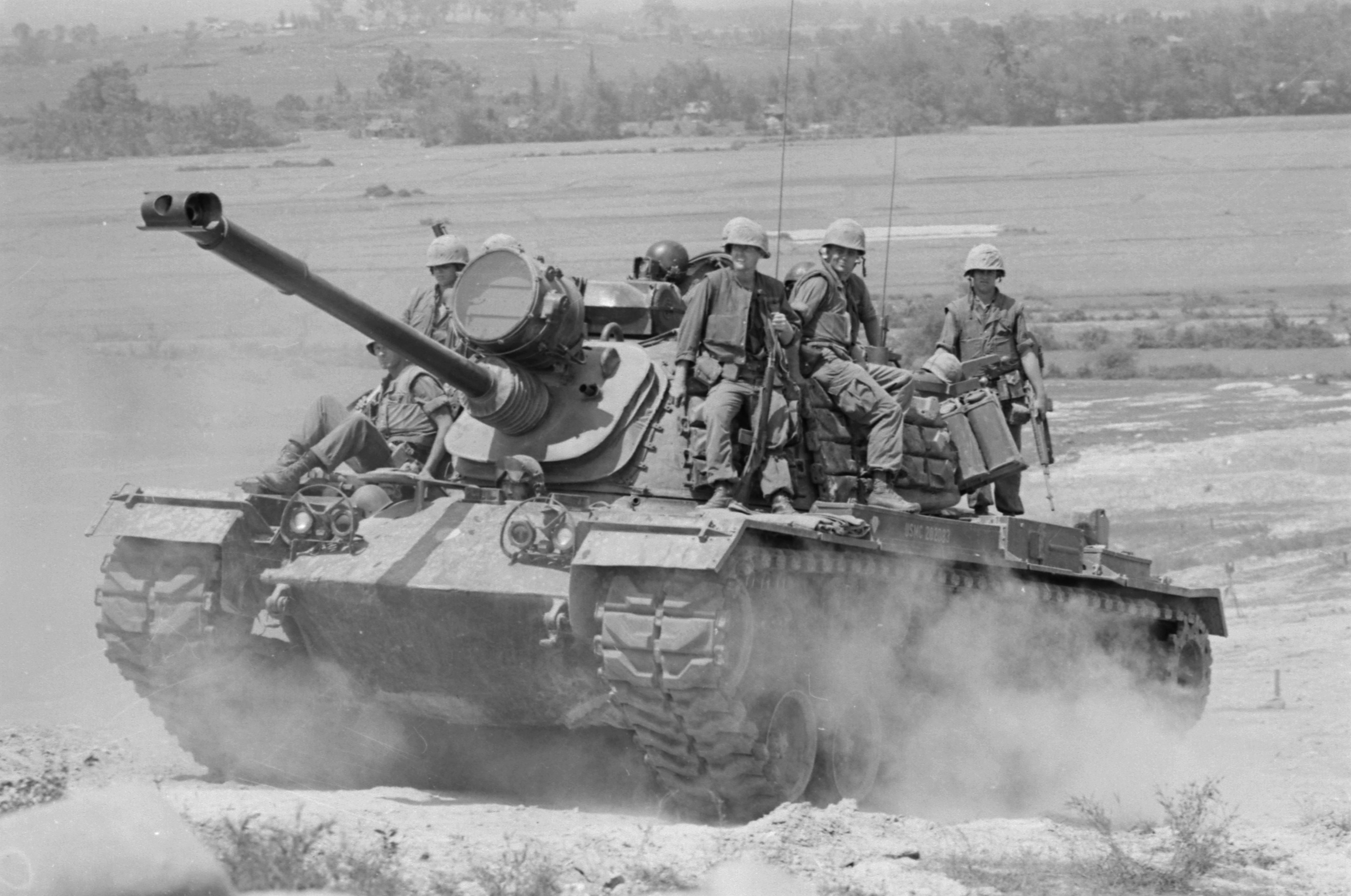
Infantry of E Company, 2nd Battalion, 3rd Marines, riding on an M48A3 in Vietnam, 1966

Citing high fuel consumption, poor low-end torque, and the extreme fuel flammability of gasoline engines, ARCOVE industrial representatives had expressed desires for a diesel engine for the M48 since 1953. Continental Motors and OTAC began to develop an experimental X-shaped vapour-cycled engine design powered by hydrocarbons in 1954 for the T95 tank but it remained unreliable. In June 1955, OTAC adopted the recommendations and allowed a diesel engine to be used if it significantly improved fuel economy.

By August 1956 the diesel powered AVDS-1790 was recommended as meeting this requirement, and the Army requested the initial retrofitting of approximately 1,020 older M48A1s and A2s with the new engine in December. By February 1957, the Army had around 600 converted M48A3 Patton tanks and the Marine Corps had received 419. Because many M48A3 tanks were conversions from earlier models many details varied among individual examples of this type. M48A3 tanks could have either three or five support rollers on each side and might have either the early or later type headlight assemblies, some retained their earlier Mod A turrets and different cupola styles.

During the Hungarian Revolution of 1956, a Soviet T-54A medium tank was driven onto the grounds of the UK's embassy in Budapest by the Hungarians. After a brief examination of this tank's armor and 100 mm gun by a British military attaché, the UK decided that their 20 pounder (84mm L/66.7) was apparently incapable of defeating it. There were also rumors of an even larger 115 mm gun in the works. In response to this the US Army started development of the XM60 to replace the M48 tank series and incorporating the ARCOVE recommendation of a more powerful main gun, the Royal Ordnance L7 (105mm T254). Instead of immediately getting a 105mm main gun, large stockpiles of 90 mm main gun ammunition and funding shortfalls that made it impossible to supply enough 105mm main gun rounds for all the planned tank conversions left the M48A3s with their M41 90mm guns.

In addition to the conversion of older model M48s, Chrysler continued to build new vehicles. These used the M48A2 hull design (with 3 return rollers) and had redesigned fenders and mudguards, armored boxes around the taillights among other minor details. They were fitted with another re-designed commander's cupola, the M1E1. It had a modified hatch to allow more room in comparison to the previous M1 cupola and the two rear vision blocks were eliminated. The driver's steering wheel was replaced with a T-bar control and received a padded seat. M48 procurement for the Army ceased and M48A2 hull production ended in May 1961. The Newark Tank plant was closed in October. This newest version of the M48 series received the designation Tank, Combat, Full-Tracked; 90mm Gun, M48A3 on 19 March 1958.

The M48A3 was withdrawn from Europe by October 1961, being replaced by the M60 tank. As US armored and cavalry units rotated out of combat deployments to South Vietnam most of their M48A3s were either directly transferred to the South Vietnamese army or to Thailand. FORSCOM withdrew the M48A3 from combat service with both the US Army and US Marine Corps in 1973, replacing them with the M60A1. Some M48A3s continued in service with National Guard units until 1979. Some were repurposed as Armoured vehicle-launched bridges (AVLBs). Afterwards they were relegated to target use for the testing of radar and weapons systems until the mid-1990s. They were replaced in this role by the QM60.

=== M48A4 ===
While the M60A1E1, later standardized as the M60A2, was under development, it appeared there would be many leftover M60 turrets, this resulted in a plan to transfer these turrets to M48A1 hulls modernized to the M48A3 standard. The turrets were essentially the same, although fitted with different guns, rangefinders and commander's cupolas. However, the M60 turret featured a deeper basket necessitating the addition of spacers on the turret ring which elevated the turret by 2 inches. Also, the ammunition stowage had to be rearranged to accommodate the 105 mm ammunition, which was done by modifying the M60A1 racks.

Two of these tanks were built, with one being sent to Fort Knox during the spring of 1967, the program was approved to retrofit 243 M48A1 tanks to this new configuration. The tank was planned to be designated as the 105 mm Gun, Full-Tracked, Combat Tank M48A4, however due to the decision to limit the number of M60 tanks converted to M60A2s, the project was cancelled with no more tanks being built.

=== M48A5 ===
The M48 was retrofitted with a 105 mm gun, which fit nicely in its turret, and the M60 power pack, which was an idea that was explored since 1958, and the M48A1E1 tank passed the trials in 1960. However, the cost of replacing large stores of 90 mm ammunition was considered too high, and the idea dragged without adoption for a decade and a half until the 90 mm gun became hopelessly obsolete.

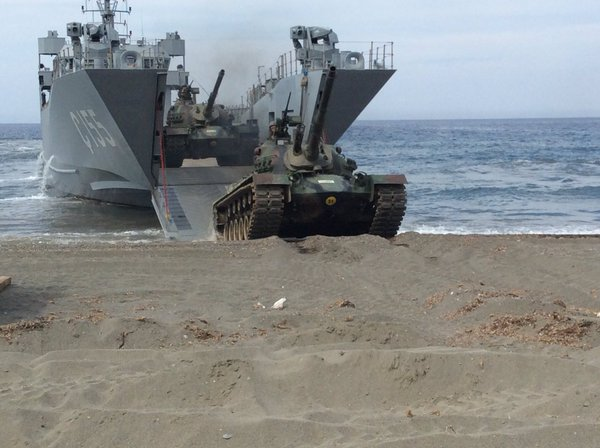
Türkish made M48A5T2 in amphibious exercise.

The Yom Kippur War in 1973 demonstrated high attrition rates of tanks due to ATGMs and, besides diverging hundreds of American tanks to make up Israeli losses, forced the US Army to raise its inventory objectives from 8,300 initially to 10,300 and by 1976 to 14,400 tanks. The opened gap had to be closed as quickly and cheaply as possible, so it was decided to rearm and re-engine reserve M48s. The program cost on average under $170,000 ($961,842 in 2025) per tank ($110,000 for diesel M48A3s and $236,000 for gasoline M48A1/A2Cs), which was about three times cheaper than a new M60A1.

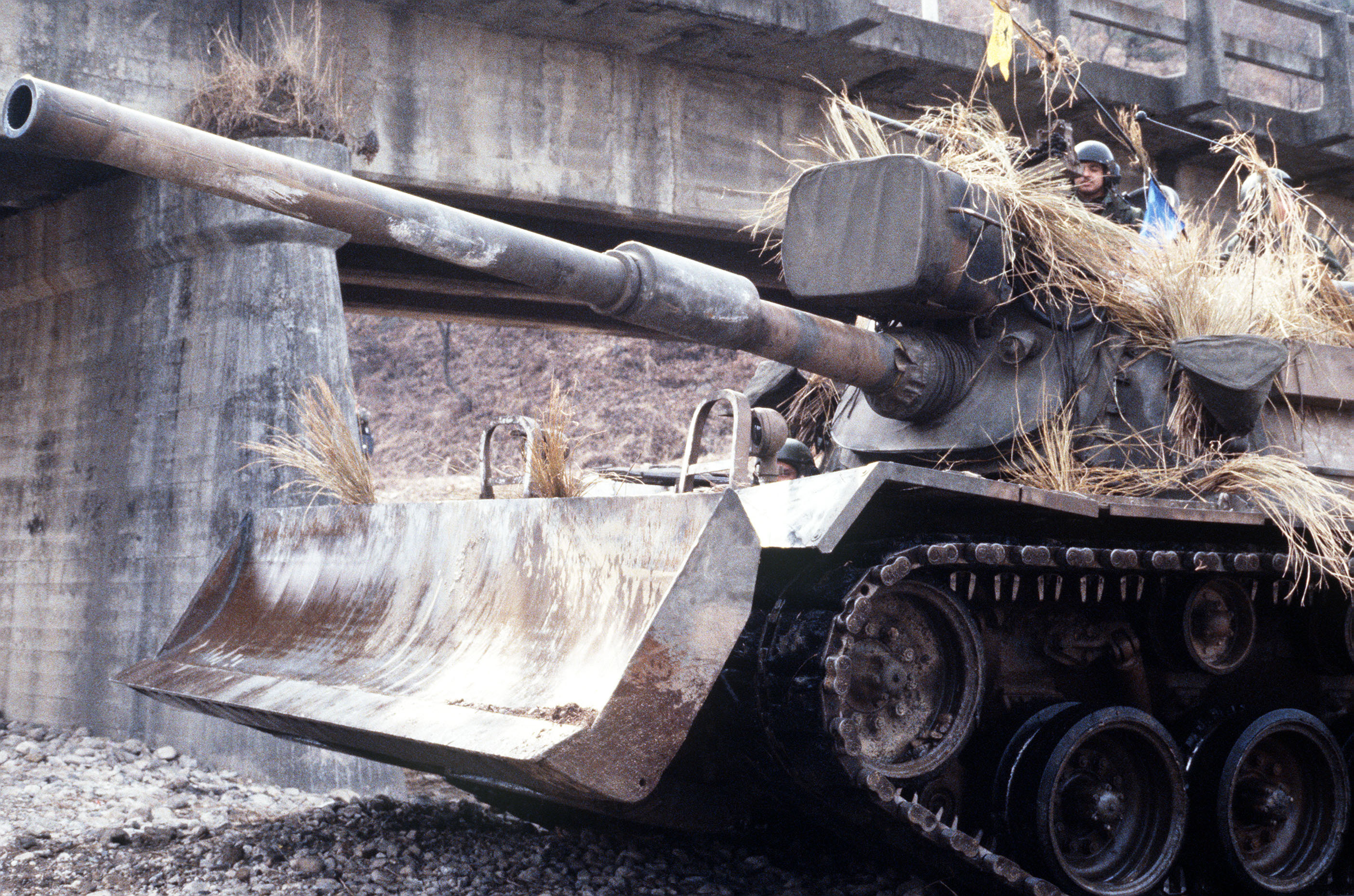
A US M48A5 Patton with a dozer blade participates in Team Spirit in Korea, 1984

The last major US upgrade of the M48 tank series was initially designated XM736, then M48A3E1 and was finally standardized as M48A5 in May 1975.

This conversion upgrade was applied to M48A3 versions still in service with Army National Guard units in order to maintain the training levels of Guard units as well as using a commonality in ammunition amongst tanks. The upgrade featured the mounting of the M68 105 mm gun carried in the M116 mount and the all-metric measurement M16 fire control system. The hull was upgraded by applying the M60A1 RISE Hull PIP Update Kit and incorporated as many of the components as possible.

Some of these included the retrofit of the AVDS-1790-2C RISE diesel engine incorporating TLAC engine panels coupled to with a CD-850-6 cross-drive transmission, a 300-gallon fuel capacity and the T142 track assembly, M13A1 NBC protection system for the crew and the replacement of the .30 caliber M37 coaxial machine gun with the 7.62mm NATO M219/T175 machine gun. Because all M48A5 tanks were conversions from earlier models, many characteristics varied among individual examples of this type. M48A5 tanks could have either three or five support rollers on each side and might have either the early or later type headlight assemblies, some retained their earlier cupola styles.

Starting in 1975 M48A3 tanks that were still in service with the Army National Guard were converted to the M48A5 standard. These tanks were initially converted from former M48A3 tanks using the M48A1 hull design (with 5 return rollers) and given the designation M48A5PI. But, after August 1976 these early hull conversions were further upgraded, the Product Improvement (PI) designation was removed, and these tanks were redesignated as the M48A5. By March 1978, 708 M48A5 tanks had been converted from the M48A1 hull model.^{:242} In conjunction with the conversion of M48A1 tank hulls, the conversion of M48A3s mated to M48A2 hulls (with 3 return rollers) to the M48A5 standard was also implemented in 1976. The conversion program ran from October 1975 to December 1979 with a total of 2,069 M48A3s converted to the A5 standard.^{:242}

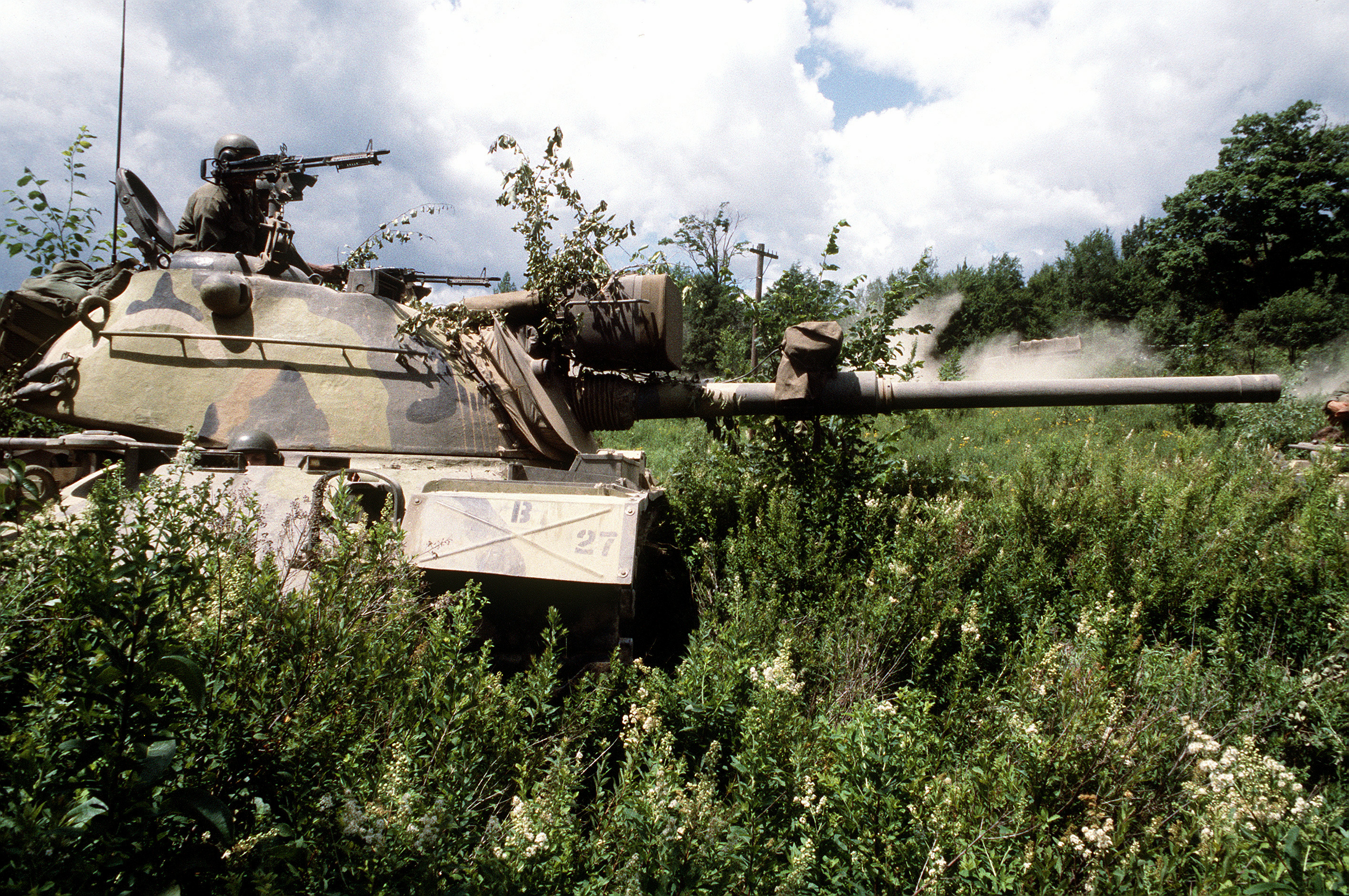
An M48A5 of B Co., 1st Battalion/ 127th Armor Regiment, 42nd Infantry Division, New York Army National Guard performing as the OPFOR force during joint exercise Sentry Castle 1981 at Ft. Drum, NY.

They were used by Guard units in CONUS to maintain their training levels and proficiency. In May 1987, at Fort McCoy, 1st Battalion, 632nd Armor Regiment of the Wisconsin Army National Guard retired the last M48 tanks in the US military. The tanks were parked in a holding pen at the WI ARNG Mobilization and Training Equipment Site (MATES) and later transferred to the Moroccan Army. They were replaced in National Guard service by the M60A3. However many other countries continue to use these M48 models.

Israel's wartime experiences with their M48/E48C Magach tanks spurred the IDF to implement its own changes. These included replacing the M1 cupola with a low-profile "Urdan" type that mounted an M60D machine gun for use by the tank commander. A second M60 machine gun was mounted on the turret roof for use by the loader. Internal ammunition stowage for the 105mm main gun was also increased to 54 rounds. Many of them were fitted with Blazer ERA panels.

=== E48 series ===
M48s for use in foreign military service were designated as the E48 series by the US Foreign Military Sales (FMS). These were essentially M48s with minor modifications requested by approved foreign purchasers. Some of the modifications included removal of the M1 cupola, different models of machine guns, electronics, fire control systems or radios, external armor plates, smoke launchers and power packs. Israel purchased many of these tanks forming the genesis of the Magach series.

This series included the following designations:

- E48: modified M48/M48A1 variant for non-US service
- E48A: modified M48A2 variant for non-US service
- E48B: modified M48A3 variant for non-US service
- E48C: modified M48A5 variant for non-US service
- E48 AVLB: modified M48 AVLB variant for non-US service

== Combat service ==
=== Vietnam War ===
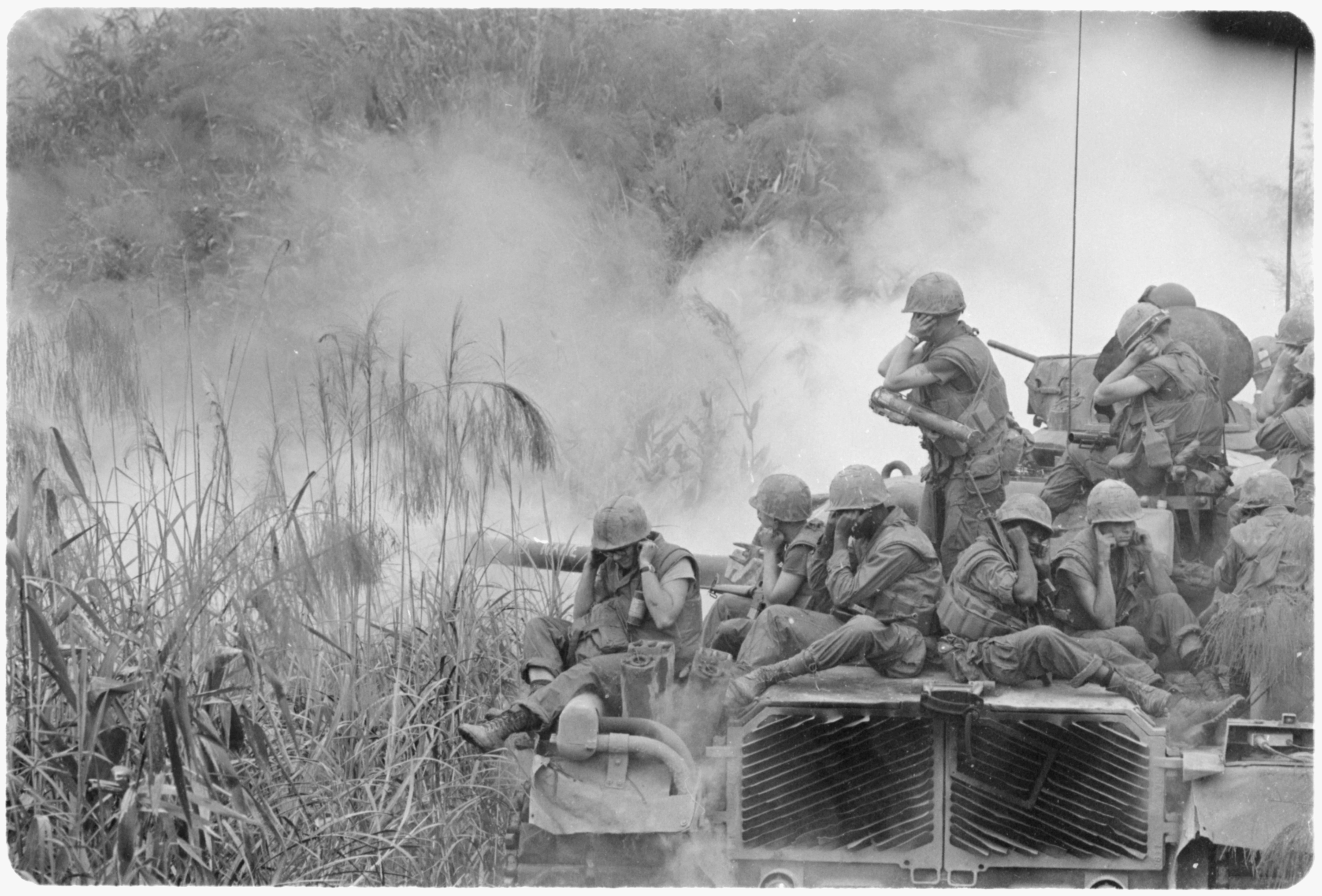
US Marines riding atop an M48 in Vietnam in April 1968

The M48 saw extensive action with the US military during the Vietnam War. Over 600 Pattons would be deployed with US forces during that war. The initial M48s first landed with the US Marine 1st and 3rd Tank Battalions in 1965, with the 5th Marine Tank Battalion later becoming a back-up/reinforcement unit. The remaining Pattons deployed to South Vietnam were in three US Army battalions, namely the 1-77th Armor near the DMZ (67 M48A2C (23 tanks supplied from US Army Training Center at Fort Knox, and 44 tanks from Letterkenny Army Depot) tanks were used by the 77th Armor from August 1968 to January 1969.

These were later replaced with M48A3s, the 1-69th Armor in the Central Highlands of central South Vietnam and the 2-34th Armor positioned near the Mekong Delta. Each battalion consisted of approximately 57 tanks. M48s were also used by Armored Cavalry Squadrons in Vietnam until replaced by M551 Sheridan Armored Reconnaissance Airborne Assault Vehicles (ARAAV) in the Divisional Cavalry Squadrons. M48A3 tanks remained in service with the 11th Armored Cavalry Regiment until the unit was withdrawn from the conflict. Some M48 variants, nicknamed "Zippos", or M67A1 Flame tanks were used by some U.S. Marine Corps units, but the US Army no longer used them. From 1965 to 1968, 120 US M48A3 tanks were written off.

M48 of B Troop, 1st Squadron, 10th Cavalry, 4th Infantry Division, in the Central Highlands, June 1969

The M48 Patton has the distinction of playing a unique role in an event that was destined to radically alter the conduct of armored warfare. When US forces commenced redeployment operations, many of the M48A3 Pattons were turned over to the Army of the Republic of Vietnam (ARVN) forces, in particular creating the battalion-sized ARVN 20th Tank Regiment, which supplemented their M41 Walker Bulldog units. During the North Vietnamese People's Army of Vietnam (PAVN) Easter Offensive in 1972, tank clashes between PAVN T-54/PT-76 and ARVN M48/M41 units became commonplace.

On 23 April 1972, tankers of the 20th Tank Regiment were attacked by a PAVN infantry-tank team, which was equipped with the new 9M14M Malyutka (NATO designation: Sagger) wire-guided anti-tank missile. During this battle, one M48A3 Patton tank and one M113 Armored Cavalry Assault Vehicle (ACAV) were destroyed, becoming the first losses to the Sagger missile; losses that would echo on an even larger scale a year later during the Yom Kippur War in the Middle East in 1973. By 2 May, the 20th Tank Regiment had lost all of their tanks to enemy fire. During the first month of the First Battle of Quảng Trị, all ARVN M48 Pattons (100 tanks) were lost. (Note: 1st Armor Brigade lost 43 M48s and 66 M41s, 20th Tank Regiment lost 57 M48s)

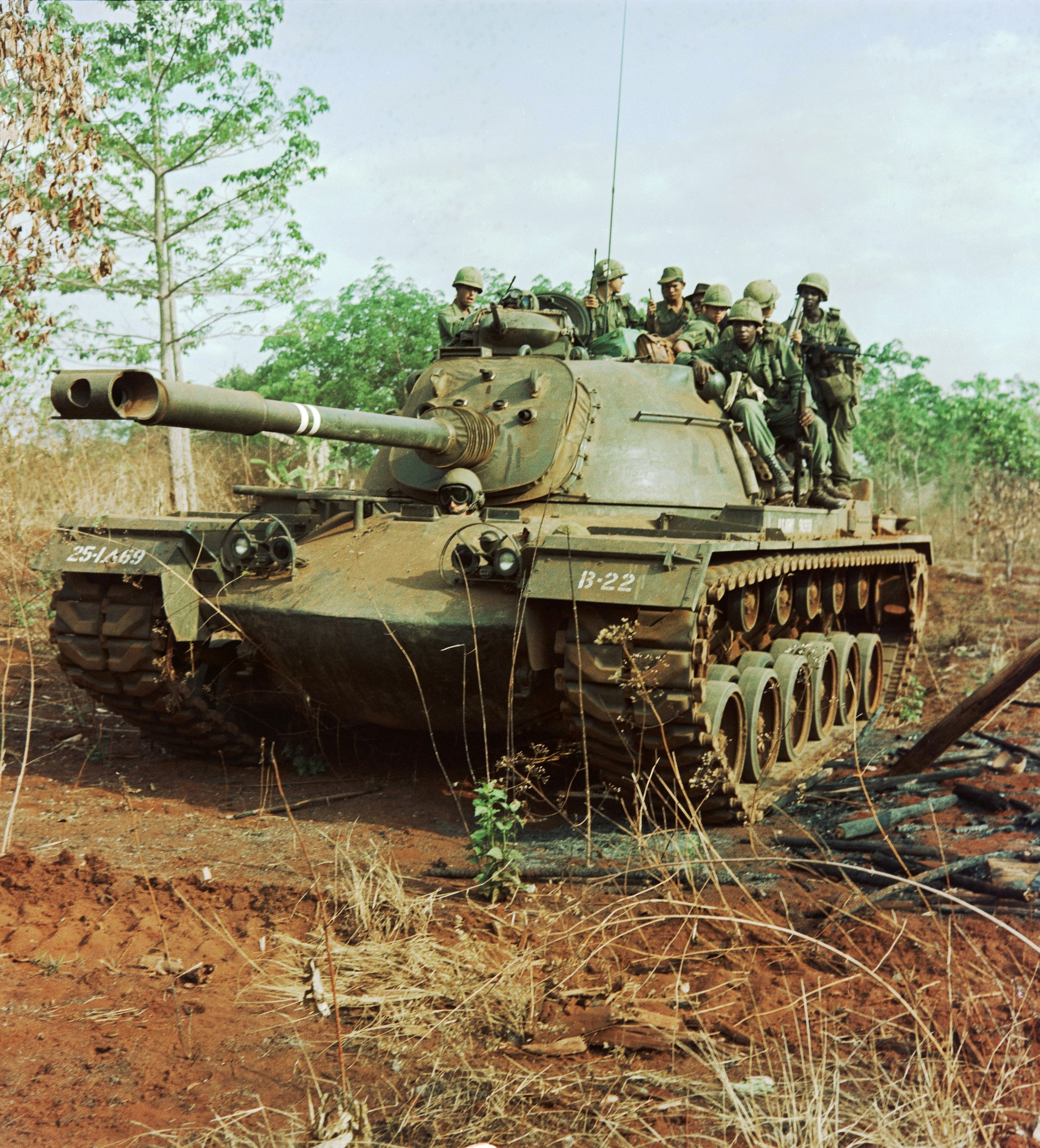
A 1st Battalion, 69th Armor M48 during Operation Lincoln

The M48s performed admirably in South Vietnam in the infantry-support role. However, there were few actual tank-versus-tank battles. One was between the US 1-69th Armor and PT-76 light amphibious tanks of the PAVN 202nd Armored Regiment at Ben Het Camp in March 1969. The M48s provided adequate protection for its crew from small arms, mines, and rocket-propelled grenades. South Vietnamese M48s and M41s fought in the 1975 Spring Offensive. In several incidents, the ARVN successfully defeated PAVN T-34 and T-55 tanks and even slowed the North's offensive.

However, due to shortages of fuel and munitions faced by the South Vietnamese military because of the US Congress-placed ban on the further funding and supply of military equipment and logistics to the country, the American-made tanks soon ran out of ammunition and fuel and were quickly abandoned to the PAVN, which then put them in their service after the war ended in May 1975. In total, 250 of the ARVN's M48A3s were destroyed and captured and those captured (at least 30) were only used briefly before being phased out and turned into war-memorial displays all over Vietnam.

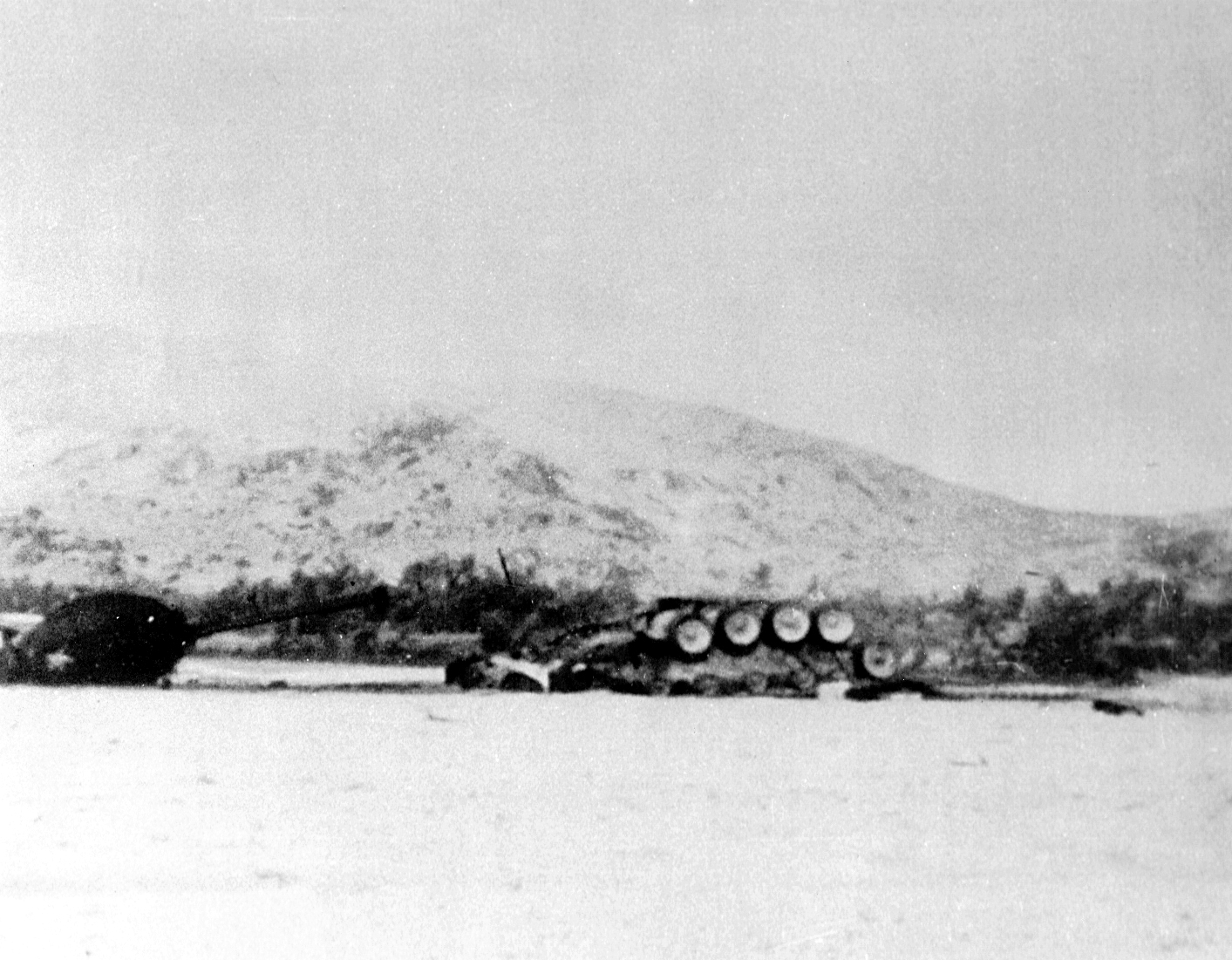
A destroyed M48A3 during Vietnam war - victim of a mine.

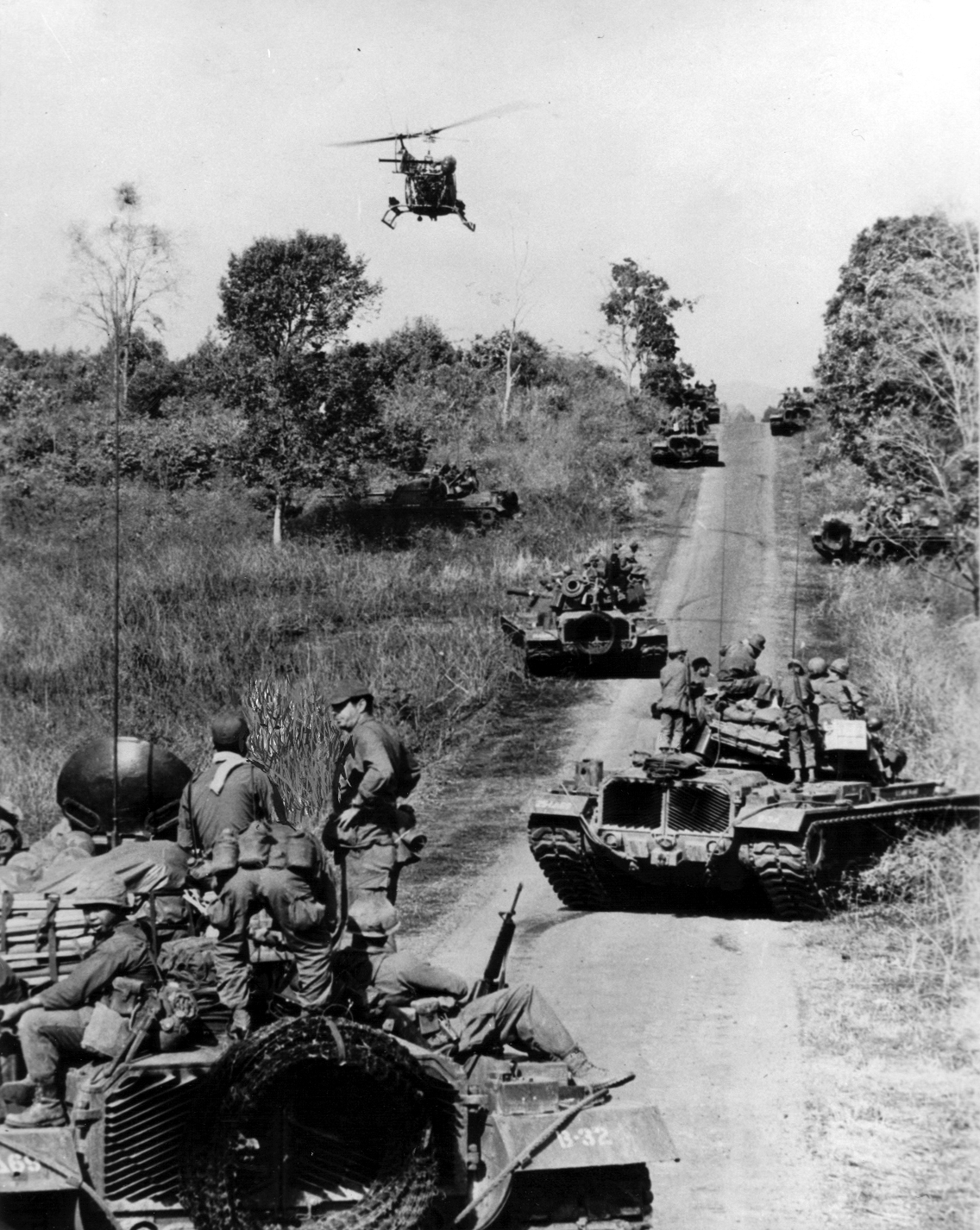
M48 tanks in a defensive herringbone formation along a road in Vietnam, west of Pleiku, April 1, 1966.

M48s, along with Australian 20 pounder (84 mm)-gunned Centurions of the 1st Armoured Regiment, were the only vehicles in use by the anti-communist side in the Vietnam War that could reasonably protect their crews from land mines. They were often used for minesweeping operations along Highway 19 in the Central Highlands, a two-lane paved road between An Khe and Pleiku. Daily convoys moved both ways along Highway 19. These convoys were held up each morning while the road was swept for mines. At that time, minesweeping was done by soldiers walking slowly over the dirt shoulders of the highway with hand-held mine detectors.

During this slow process, convoys would build up into a dangerously inviting target for the enemy, especially their guerillas and partisans. As a result, a faster method was improvised, the "Thunder Run", in which one M48 lined up on each side of the road, with one track on the dirt shoulder and the other track on the asphalt, and then with all guns firing, they raced to a designated position miles away. If the M48s made it without striking a mine, the road was clear, and the convoys could proceed. In most cases, an M48 that struck a land mine in these operations only lost a road wheel or two in the explosion; seldom was there any hull damage that would be considered a catastrophic kill.

Supply of M48A3 tanks to South Vietnam:

- 1971: 54.
- May 1972: 120.
- October 1972: 72.
- November 1972: 59.
- January 1973 - July 1974: 16.
- Total: at least 321 M48 tanks.

According to official US data 343 M48s were delivered to the ARVN up to March 1975., all of which were destroyed or captured.

The United States lost at least 123 M48 tanks (non-repairable) during the war. As a result, the United States with South Vietnam lost about 500 M48 tanks.

=== Indo-Pakistani wars ===
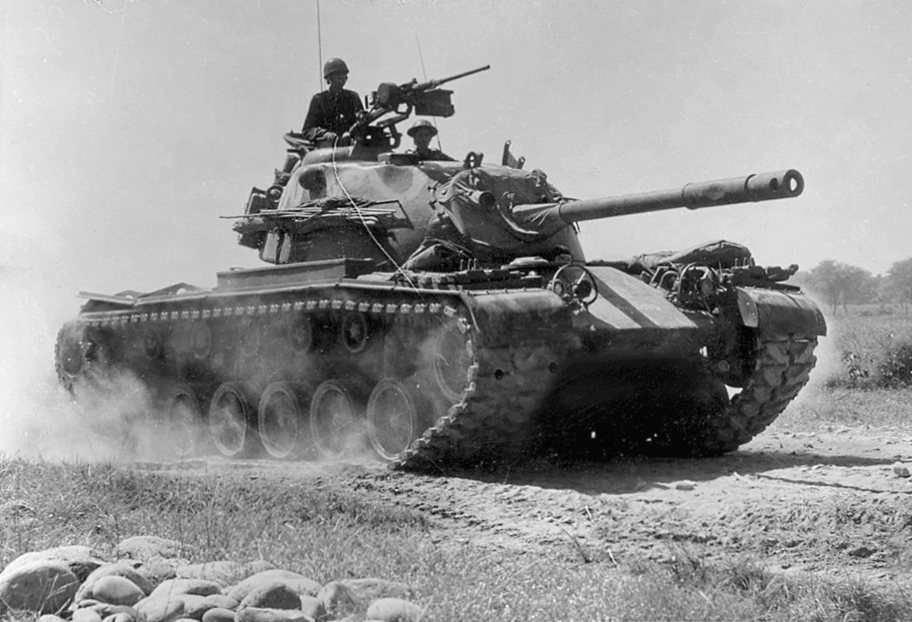
A Pakistani M48 Patton advances at Chumb in 1965.

M47s and M48s were used in tank warfare by the Pakistan Army against the Indian Army's Soviet T-55s, British Centurions and US M4 Sherman tanks in both the Indo-Pakistani War of 1965 as well as the following war in 1971 with at least some good results. During Operation Grand Slam Pakistani tank forces, composed mainly of M47 and M48 Patton tanks, thrust through the Indian defense-lines very quickly and swiftly defeated Indian Army armored counterattacks. At the Battle of Chumb, India's only tank battalion in the region was wiped out.

The Pakistanis used approximately a division's worth of tanks in the operation, although not all were Pattons, with upgraded Shermans included as well. In contrast, Pakistan's Patton tank failed to live up to its high expectations in the Battle of Asal Uttar in September 1965, where about 97 Pakistani tanks were lost, the majority of them being Pattons (M47s and M48s). Later, the Patton tank was the main Pakistani tank at the Battle of Chawinda and its performance at that battle was deemed satisfactory against Indian armor.

The Patton was later used by Pakistan again, this time, in the Indo-Pakistani War of 1971. A counterattack led by the 13th Lancers and the 31st Cavalry army units was defeated by the Indian 54th Division around Battle of Barapind in December 1971. The Pakistan Army Patton tanks could not stop an assault by Indian T-55 Soviet-supplied tanks of the 2nd Armored Brigade. At least 9 of the Pattons were destroyed by T-55 tanks during the battle of Nainakot. It total, more than 80 Pakistani Pattons were knocked out during the war, mainly by Centurion and T-55 fire.

India later set up a temporary war-memorial so named "Patton Nagar" (or "Patton City") in Khemkaran District in Punjab, where the captured Pakistani Patton tanks were displayed for a short period of time before being scrapped or sent all across India for use as war monuments and military memorials.

Analyzing their overall performance in their wars with India, the Pakistani military held that the Patton was held in reasonably-high esteem by both sides and that combat-tactics were to blame for the setback at Asal Uttar. However, a post-war US study of the tank battles in South Asia concluded that the Patton's armor could, in fact, be penetrated by the 20-pounder tank gun (84 mm) of the Centurion (later replaced by the even more successful L7 105mm gun on the Mk. 7 version which India also possessed) as well as the 75 mm tank gun of the AMX-13 light tank that was also fielded by India.

=== Other countries ===
In the 2025 Cambodian-Thai conflict, The Royal Thai Army employed M48A5PI tanks in combat against Cambodia. Thai M48A5PI tanks engaged variety of Cambodian targets as videos showing these engagements were published by the Thai side.

In one incident, Royal Thai Army M48A5 tanks engaged 4 Cambodian T-55 tanks on the Thai-Cambodian border, shortly after the video was posted, another video emerged depicting at least one Cambodian T-55 tank destroyed during the engagement.

=== Middle East ===
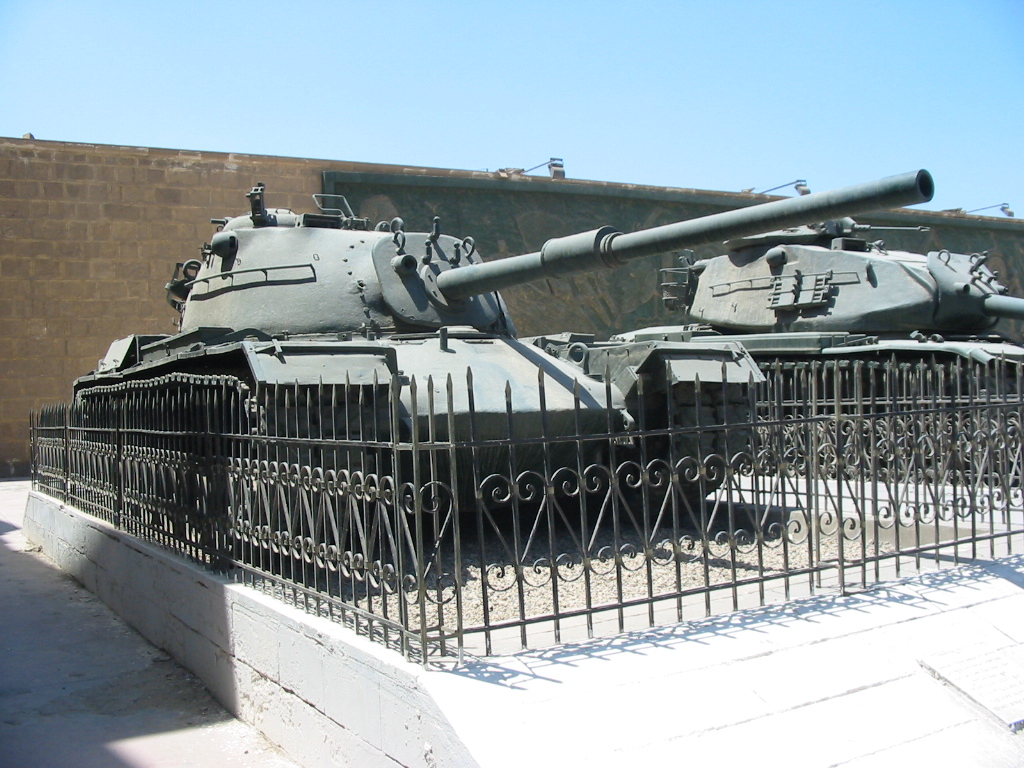
An ex-Israeli M48 captured by Egypt during the Yom Kippur War in 1973

M48s were also used with mixed results during the Six-Day War of 1967. On the Sinai battlefront, Israeli M48s upgunned with the then-advanced 105 mm L7 rifled tank gun were used with considerable success against Egyptian IS-3s, T-54s/T-55s, T-34/85s and SU-100s supplied by the Soviet Union during the 1950s and the 1960s (such as during the Second Battle of Abu-Ageila. On the Sinai front, Israel lost 50 M48 tanks of 117: 39 M48A2C and 11 M48A3. However, on the West Bank war-front, Jordanian M48s (Jordan was also a user of the M48 Patton as was Israel at the same time-period) were often defeated by Israeli 105mm-armed Centurions and WWII-era upgraded M4 Shermans - M-51s upgunned with French-built 105 mm tank guns, not to be confused with the British L7 105mm tank gun.

In purely technical terms, the Pattons were far superior to the much-older Shermans, with shots at more than 1,000 meters simply glancing off the M48's armor. However, the 105 mm main gun of the Israeli Shermans fired a HEAT round designed to defeat the Soviet T-62 tank, which was the USSR's response to the M48's successor in US service, the M60 tank. The Jordanian Pattons' general failure on the West Bank could also be attributed to excellent Israeli air superiority. The Israeli Army captured about 100 Jordanian M48 and M48A1 tanks and pressed them into service in their own units after the war, as were the Jordanian M113 APCs they seized during the war.

Israel used 445 M48 tanks in 1973 during the Yom Kippur War. From 15 to 18 October, M48 tanks participated in the largest tank battle of the war - Battle of the Chinese Farm. The battle involved the Egyptian 21st Armored Division (136 T-55s), 25th Armored Brigade (75 T-62s), tank battalion (21 T-55s) from 24th Armored Brigade (in the total 232 Egyptian tanks) and the Israeli 143rd and 162nd Armored Divisions (about 440 tanks).

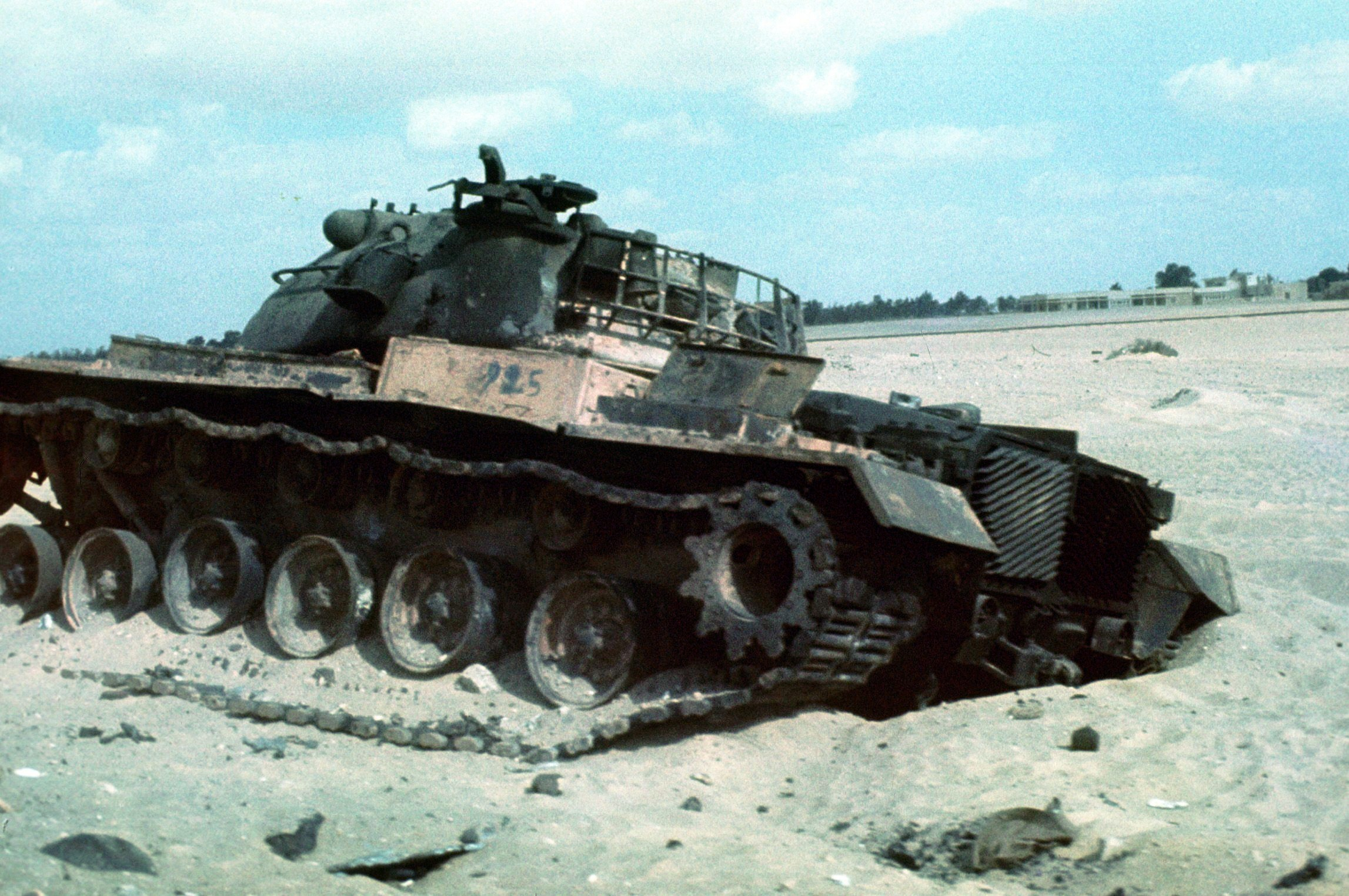
An Israeli M48 destroyed during fighting in the Yom Kippur War.

The battle ended with an Israeli victory, but both sides lost a huge number of tanks in this battle (each side lost about two hundred tanks). On the night of 15/16 October, the Israeli 14th Brigade of the 143rd Division lost 70 tanks out of 97. Between the 16th at 0900 and the 17th at 1400, the Israeli 143rd and 162nd Divisions have lost 96 tanks. As of 18 October, the Egyptian 21st Armored Division had no more than 40 tanks remaining of an original 136 tanks available at the start of the battle, 25th Armored Brigade had only 10 tanks of an original 75 T-62s.

Totally, when the Yom Kippur War broke out, Israel had 540 M48-series (with 105 mm gun) and M60/M60A1 tanks. During the war, the tanks suffered heavy losses. The location of flammable hydraulic fluid at the front of the turret was discovered to be a severe vulnerability. Egypt had destroyed a large number of Israeli tanks, and after the war, only 200 M48 and M60A1 tanks remained. Israel entrenched most of these tanks in the Sinai front against opposite entrenched Egyptian infantry armed with 9M14 Malyutka anti tank missiles.

Aside from the Israel Defense Forces (IDF), the M48 was also operated by the Lebanese Army, the Christian Lebanese Forces militia, the Druze Progressive Socialist Party's People's Liberation Army militia, the Shia Amal militia and the South Lebanon Army. All the tanks seized by the militias were captured from the Army's mostly Druze 4th Infantry Brigade which collapsed due to sectarian divisions in 1983. On 10 June 1982, eight Israeli M48A3s, two M60A1s and at least three M113 APCs were lost in a successful ambush by Syrian T-55 tanks and BMP-1 infantry fighting vehicles (IFVs) during the Battle of Sultan Yacoub in 1982.

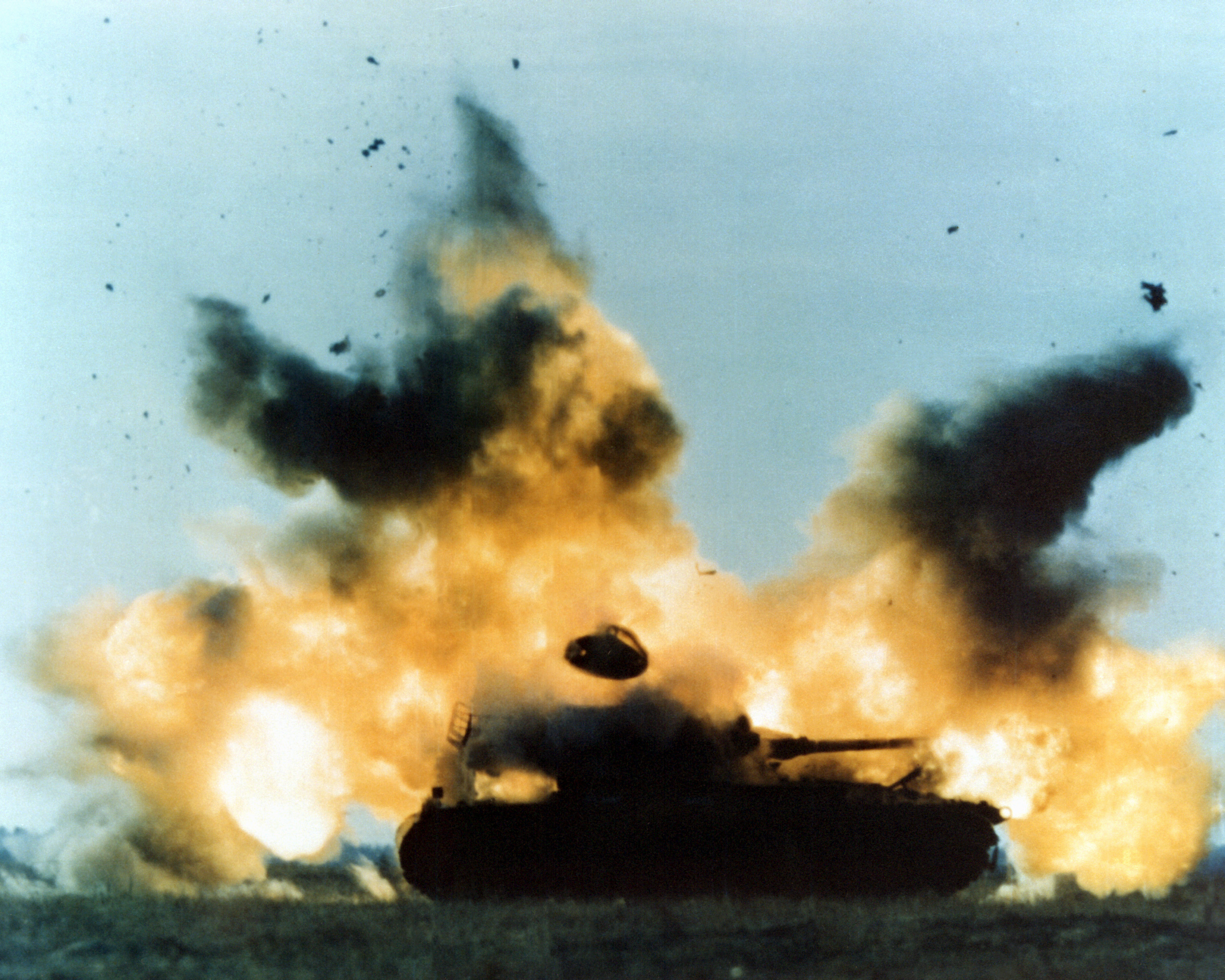
A target QM48 struck by an AGM-65 Maverick missile during a weapons test

The Lebanese Army still operates about 100 M48s. In 2007, during the 2007 North Lebanon conflict, Lebanese Army M48s shelled militant outposts located in a refugee camp.

Together with the M47, M48 tanks were used by the Turkish Armed Forces during the Turkish invasion of Cyprus in 1974. The Turkish Armed Forces in Northern Cyprus continue to use M48 tanks today.

When the Kurdish–Turkish conflict began, the Turkish Armed Forces had a number of M48s. These were used throughout the 1980s and the 1990s as static artillery and was used in defending military-base perimeters from enemy attacks.

Iranian M48 tanks were used widely in the Iran–Iraq War from 1980 to 1988, where they faced Iraqi T-55s, T-62s and T-72s, alongside M60 Pattons, in fierce and harsh combat with their Iraqi foes, with mixed results. M48s of the 37th Armored Brigade were used in the Battle of Abadan. About 150 M48s were lost in this tank battle alone.

=== Africa ===
In 1973, Morocco took delivery of its first M48A3s. By the end of the 1970s, further deliveries of M48A5 had occurred and the upgrade to M48A5 was achieved locally with the aid of US consultants. In 1987, a final shipment of 100 M48A5 tanks from the Wisconsin National Guard was delivered to the Moroccan army. There are unconfirmed reports of deliveries of Israeli M48A5s during the 1980s. The tanks were used in the Western Sahara desert against Polisario guerrillas.

Pakistan used M48 Pattons while reinforcing American troops during the Battle of Mogadishu in 1993.

== Specifications ==
	T48	M48	M48A1	M48A2	M48A3	M48A5
Overall length (gun forward)	343.7 in (8.7 m)	346.9 in (8.8 m)		341.8 in (8.7 m)		366.4 in (9.3 m)
Overall width	143.0 in (3.6 m)					
Height	127.6 in (3.2 m) (over MG)		121.6 in (3.1 m) (over cupola periscope)		129.3 in (3.3 m) (over cupola periscope)	120.5 in (3.1 m) (over cupola periscope)
Ground clearance	16.5 in (41.9 cm)					
Top speed	30 mph (48 km/h)	28 mph (45 km/h)		30 mph (48 km/h)		
Fording	48 in (1.2 m)			40 in (1.0 m)	48 in (1.2 m) w/o kit	
Max. grade	60%					
Max. trench	8.5 ft (2.6 m)					
Max. wall	36 in (0.9 m)					
Range	70 mi (110 km)			160 mi (260 km)	300 mi (480 km)	
Power	810 hp (600 kW) at 2800 rpm			825 hp (615 kW) at 2800 rpm	750 hp (560 kW) at 2400 rpm	
Power-to-weight ratio	16.5 hp/ST (13.6 kW/t)	16.4 hp/ST (13.5 kW/t)	15.6 hp/ST (12.8 kW/t)	15.7 hp/ST (12.9 kW/t)	14.0 hp/ST (11.5 kW/t)	13.9 hp/ST (11.4 kW/t)
Torque	1,610 lb⋅ft (2,180 N⋅m) at 2200 rpm		1,600 lb⋅ft (2,170 N⋅m) at 2200 rpm	1,670 lb⋅ft (2,260 N⋅m) at 2200 rpm	1,710 lb⋅ft (2,320 N⋅m) at 1800 rpm	
Weight, combat loaded	98,400 lb (44,630 kg)	99,000 lb (44,910 kg)	104,000 lb (47,170 kg)	105,000 lb (47,630 kg)	107,000 lb (48,530 kg)	108,000 lb (48,990 kg)
Ground pressure	11.2 psi (77 kPa)		11.8 psi (81 kPa)	11.9 psi (82 kPa)	12.1 psi (83 kPa)	12.2 psi (84 kPa)
Main armament	90 mm M41/T139					105 mm M68
Elevation, main gun	+20° −9°	+19° −9°				
Traverse rate	10 seconds/360°	15 seconds/360°				
Elevation rate	4°/second					
Main gun ammo	60 rounds			64 rounds	62 rounds	54 rounds
Firing rate	8 rounds/minute					7 rounds/minute

== Variants ==
- T48: Developmental prototypes designed in 1950 and used between 1951 and 1955.
- M48: Initial production variant with Mod A hull & turret designs featuring M41/T139 90mm gun, M1 remote-controllable machine gun mount and AV-1790-5 or -7 gasoline engine. Deemed not fit for combat use in Europe, relegated to CONUS use only.
  - M48C: M48 with incorrect hull ballistic protection. Relegated by CONARC to the Armored Forces School at Fort Knox for non-ballistic training of crewmembers and maintenance personnel.
- M48A1: First variant to have M1 cupola and Mod B hull design. Fitted with external fuel drums to extend its range.
- M48A2: Redesigned hull with simplified suspension system and louvered engine access doors, AVI-1790-8 fuel-injected gasoline engine and Mod B turret design.
  - M48A2C: M48A2 fitted with M13 fire control system
- M48A3: Featured AVDS-1790-2A diesel engine and M1E1 cupola. Withdrawn from combat use in 1973, replaced by M60A1.
- M48A4: M60 turrets on M48A1 hulls modernized to the M48A3 standard. Fitted with spacers on the turret ring to elevate the turret and the rearrangement of ammunition stowage to accommodate the 105 mm ammunition.
- M48A5PI: Early conversions of M48A1 hulls to the M48A5 standard. Retained the AVDS-1790-2A engine, CD-850-5A transmission and T97 track. All were further upgraded in 1976 with components from the M60A1 RISE Hull PIP Update Kit and redesignated M48A5.
- M48A5: Featured M68 105mm gun, all metric-measurement M16 FCS, coax machine gun upgraded to M219 and a crew NBC protection system. Hull component upgrades included AVDS-1790-2C RISE engine, TLAC engine panels and T142 track. Some were fitted with the M19 cupola. All were relegated to the Army National Guard for CONUS training use. Replaced by the M60A3.
- QM48: M48A3 designation for target vehicles. Withdrawn from use by 1994 and replaced in role by QM60.

=== Specialized ===
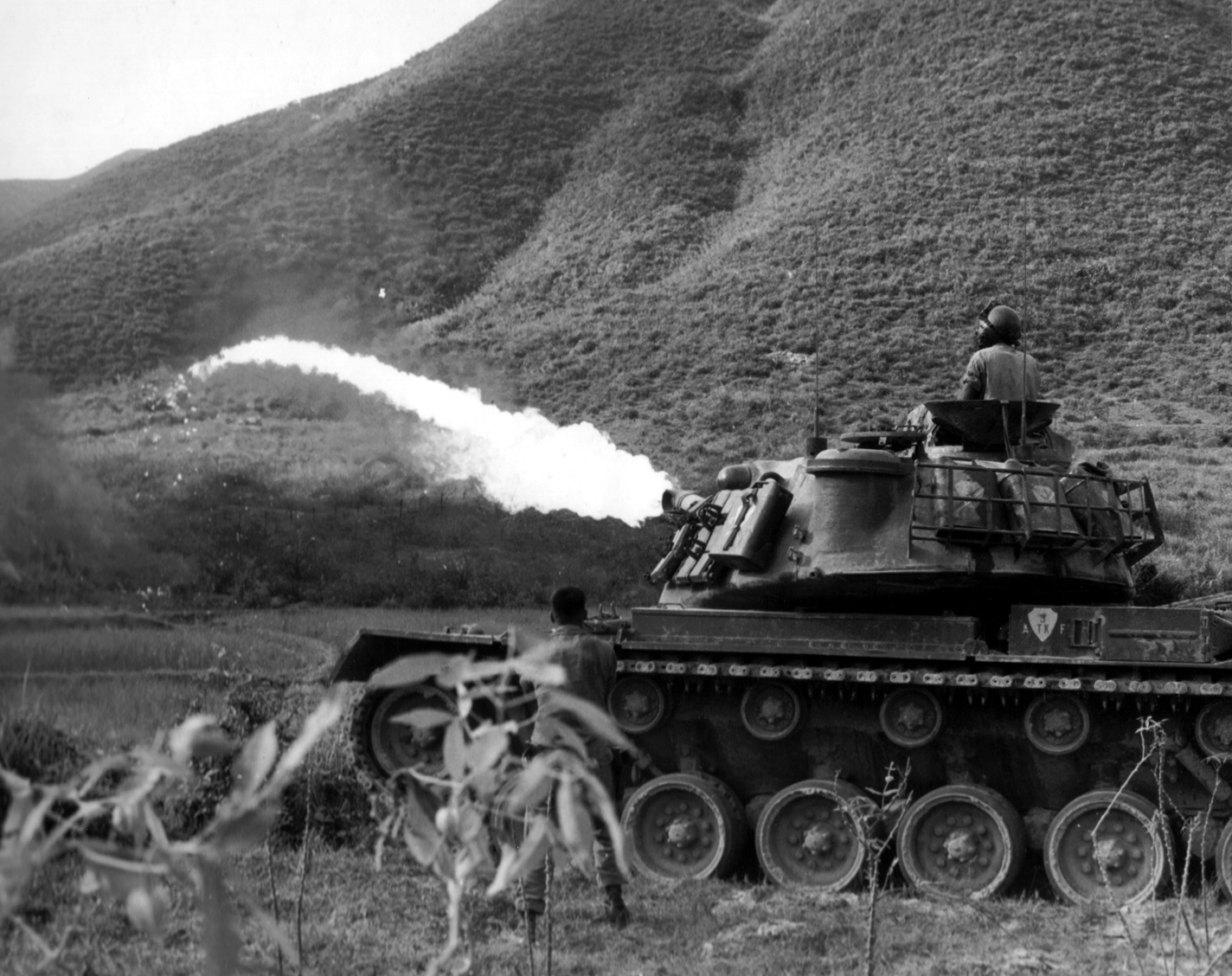
A USMC M67 Flamethrower Tank in action near Da Nang, Vietnam.

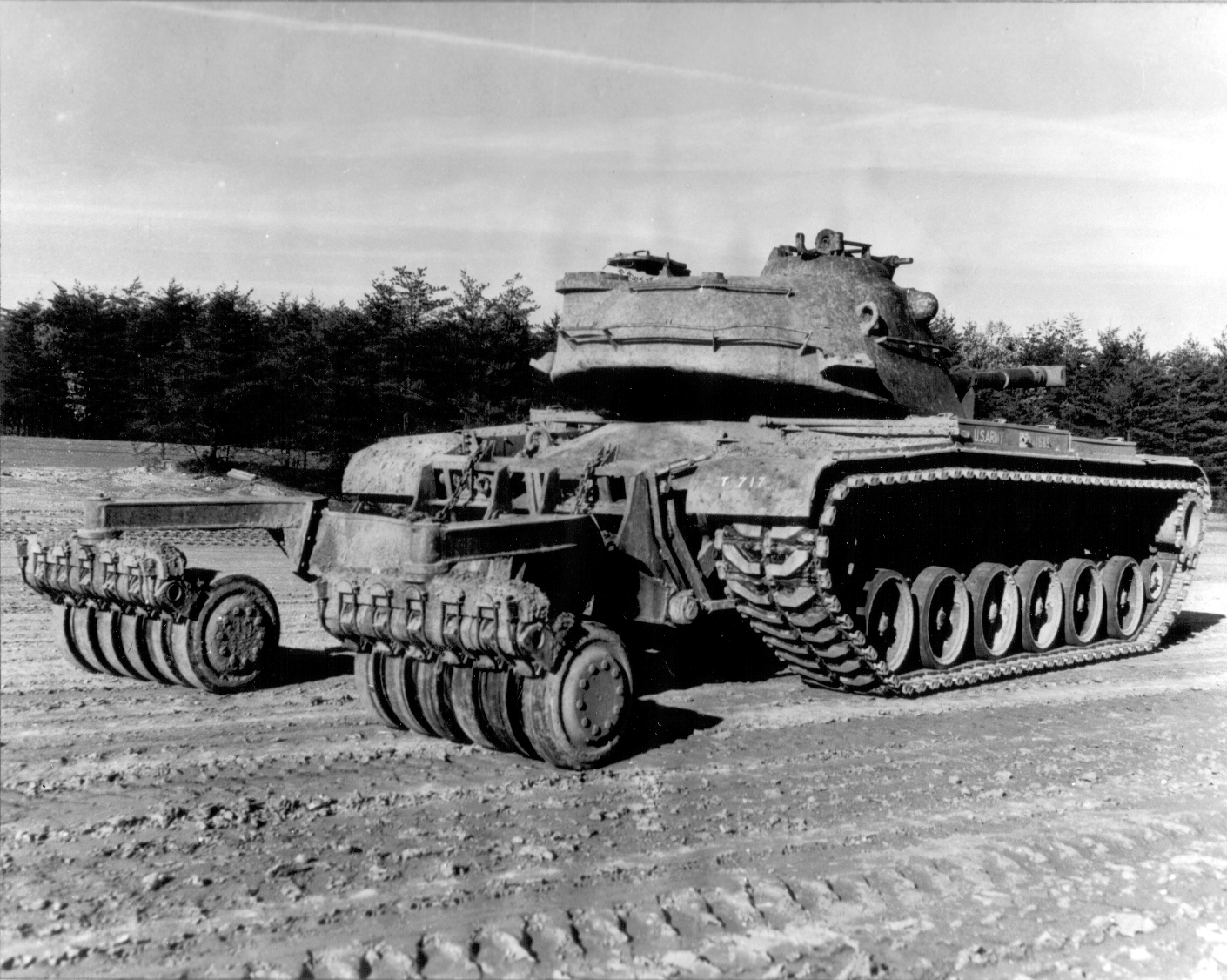
The Ensure 202 expendable tank-mounted mine roller was tried in Vietnam on the M48 tank.

- M48 AVLB: armored vehicle-launched bridge Former M48A3 with 60-foot (18 meters) scissors bridge mated to the M48A1/M48A2 hull. Most were upgraded with the M60 Hull PIP Update Kit.
- M48 GAU-8: a prototype self propelled anti-aircraft platform created by General Electric that incorporated the GAU-8 Avenger cannon as its main gun.
- M48 Tagash AVLB: Israeli variant of the M48 AVLB. Former Jordanian M48A2s. Upgraded with Merkava-based track and suspension, upgraded engine and two Tzmed tandem bridge sections.
- M67 flame thrower tank "Zippo": An M48 tank armed with a flame thrower and a mock barrel and deflector. Named after a popular cigarette lighter.
- M48 Minenräumpanzer Keiler: German mine flail variant based on the M48A2 hull with upgraded 986 hp German MTU 871 Ka501 diesel engine and Renk HSWL 284 M transmission. As of 2007 they were still in service.
- M48 Marksman SPAAG (Self-Propelled Anti-Aircraft Gun): British short range Marksman anti-aircraft system designed by GEC-Marconi. Armed with two Oerlikon 35 mm cannon mated to M48A2 hull. Not accepted for US service.
- M247 Sergeant York DIVAD (Division Air Defense): A short range air defense system designed by Ford Aerospace armed with 2 Bofors 40 mm cannons mounted on the M48A1 hull incorporating component upgrades from the M60A1 Hull PIP Kit. Canceled by 1985.
- M48T5 Tamay: Turkish combat support vehicles based on the M48A2 hull designed by TLFC Kayseri and introduced at the IDEF Show at Ankara, Turkey in December 2005.
  - M48T5 ARV (armored recovery vehicle): The turret has been replaced with a welded armored superstructure that provides protection from shell fragments and small arms fire and a front-mounted stabilizer/dozer blade. It is fitted with a hydraulically operated winch with a maximum rated capacity of 70 tons and an auxiliary winch with a capacity of two tons. Both winches are located at the front of the vehicle.
  - M48T5 CEV (Combat Engineer Vehicle): Visually similar to the ARV and has the same two winches and a front-mounted stabilizer/dozer blade. The boom is mounted on the right side of the hull at the front but has an extendable jib that can be fitted with various attachments to meet specific engineer requirements, when used as a crane it has a lift capacity of seven tons. The boom can be traversed through 195 degrees.

Additional equipment

- M8 Bulldozer Kit for the M48 tank series (SNL G278): The M8 bulldozer installed on the M48 series tank will increase the vehicle's weight by 4.45 tons (4.04 metric tons). It is controlled by the driver.

=== International ===
- E48 series: Foreign Military Sales designation for the M48 series
  - E48: modified M48/M48A1 variant for non-US service
  - E48A: modified M48A2 variant for non-US service
  - E48B: modified M48A3 variant for non-US service
  - E48C: modified M48A5 variant for non-US service
  - E48 AVLB: modified M48 AVLB variant for non-US service
- Israeli variants: Israeli M48s are part of the Magach series. Many have been upgraded with additional reactive or passive armor.
  - Magach 1: Israeli M48A1/E48 variant armed with M41 90mm main gun. Different configurations exist.
  - Magach 2: Israeli M48A2/E48A variant armed with M41 gun, some also fitted with ERA and Urdan cupola. Different configurations exist.
  - Magach 3: Modernized Israeli M48A1/A2/A3. Armed with British 105mm L7A1 cannon, Urdan cupola, new communication suite and an AVDS-1790-2A 750 hp diesel. Most were eventually fitted with Blazer ERA. Different configurations exist.
  - Magach 5: Generally similar to the Magach 3, but with upgraded AVDS-1790-2D engine and CD-850-6A transmission. Most were fitted with Blazer ERA and Urdan cupola. Different configurations exist.
- Spanish variants:

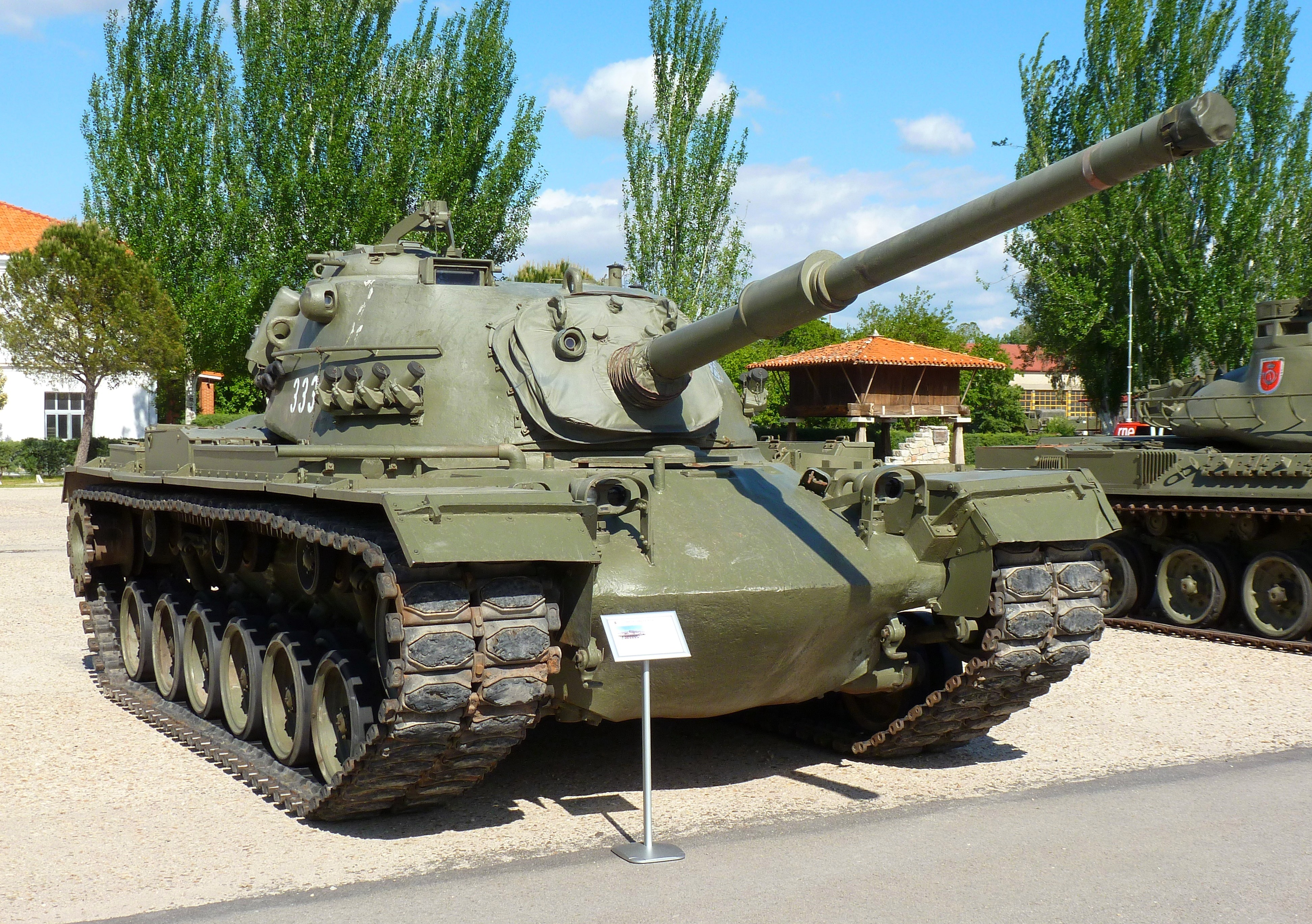
Spanish M48A5E2

  - M48A3E: M48A3/E48B variant with M68E1 105mm main gun, M17B1C rangefinder, M13A4 ballistic computer and AN/VSS-1(V)1 IR searchlight.
  - M48A5E1: M48A5E with upgraded engine
  - M48A5E2: Hughes Mk7 fire control system with laser rangefinder & solid-state ballistic computer and passive night vision equipment.
  - M48A5E3: Prototype vehicle. M48A5E2 fitted with gunner's IR thermal sight and a new gun stabilization system
- South Korean variants:

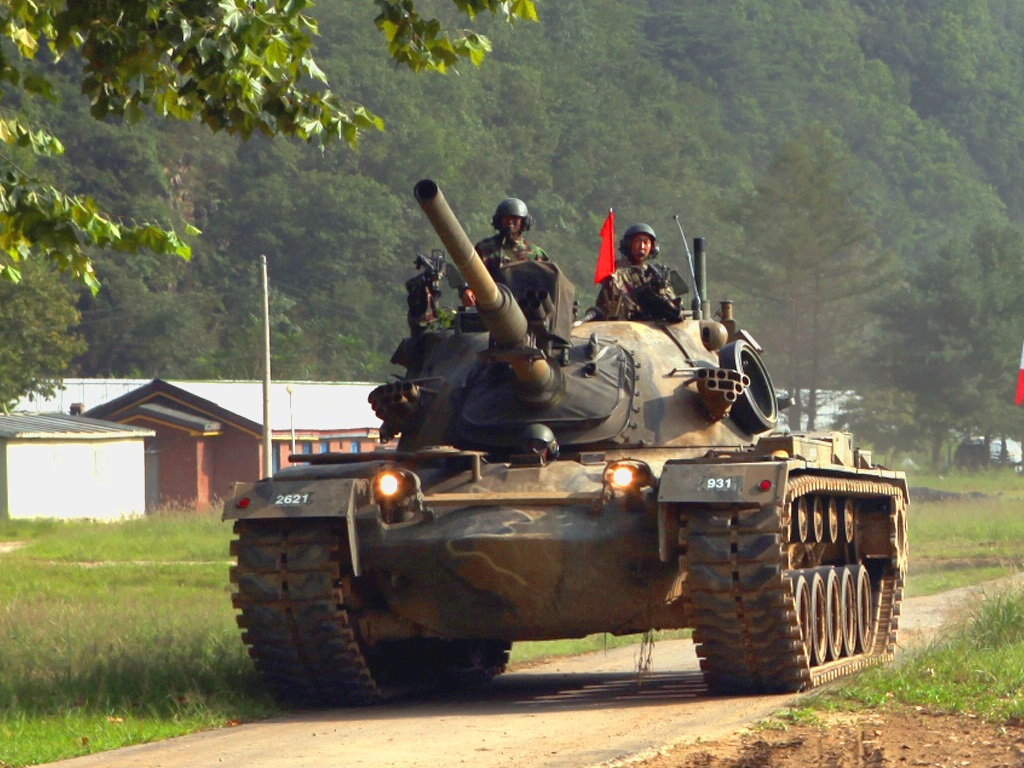
South Korean M48A5KW

  - M48A3K: South Korean modified M48A3/E48C fitted with Laser Tank Fire Control System (LTFCS)
  - M48A5K1: 105mm KM68A1 main gun, digital fire control system, M1 cupola and steel side skirts
  - M48A5K2: Same as K1 but fitted with Urdan low profile cupola.
  - M48A5KW: Same as K2 but without side skirt armor
- Taiwanese variants:
  - M48A3 (Taiwan variant): M48/E48B variant with lower fuel capacity, Operational range lowered to 194 miles (312 km)
  - M48H/CM11 Brave Tiger: M48/M60 hybrid variant mating the M48A3 turret to the M60A1 RISE hull. Included improved gun stabilization and new fire control system.
  - CM12: M48A3/E48B variant upgraded with CM11 FCS and weapons systems. Lower fuel capacity, range 126 miles (203 km).
- Turkish variants:
  - M48A5T1: Turkish M48A5/E48C variant upgraded to M60A1 level. Modifications include M68E1 105mm gun, M19 FCS, a passive night vision system and AVDS-1790-2C RISE diesel engine. Some fitted with M19 cupola.
  - M48A5T2: upgraded to M60A3 level with M21 FCS, laser range finder and TTS thermal sight for the gunner.
- West German variants: As a member of NATO, West Germany acquired a large fleet of M48 tanks.

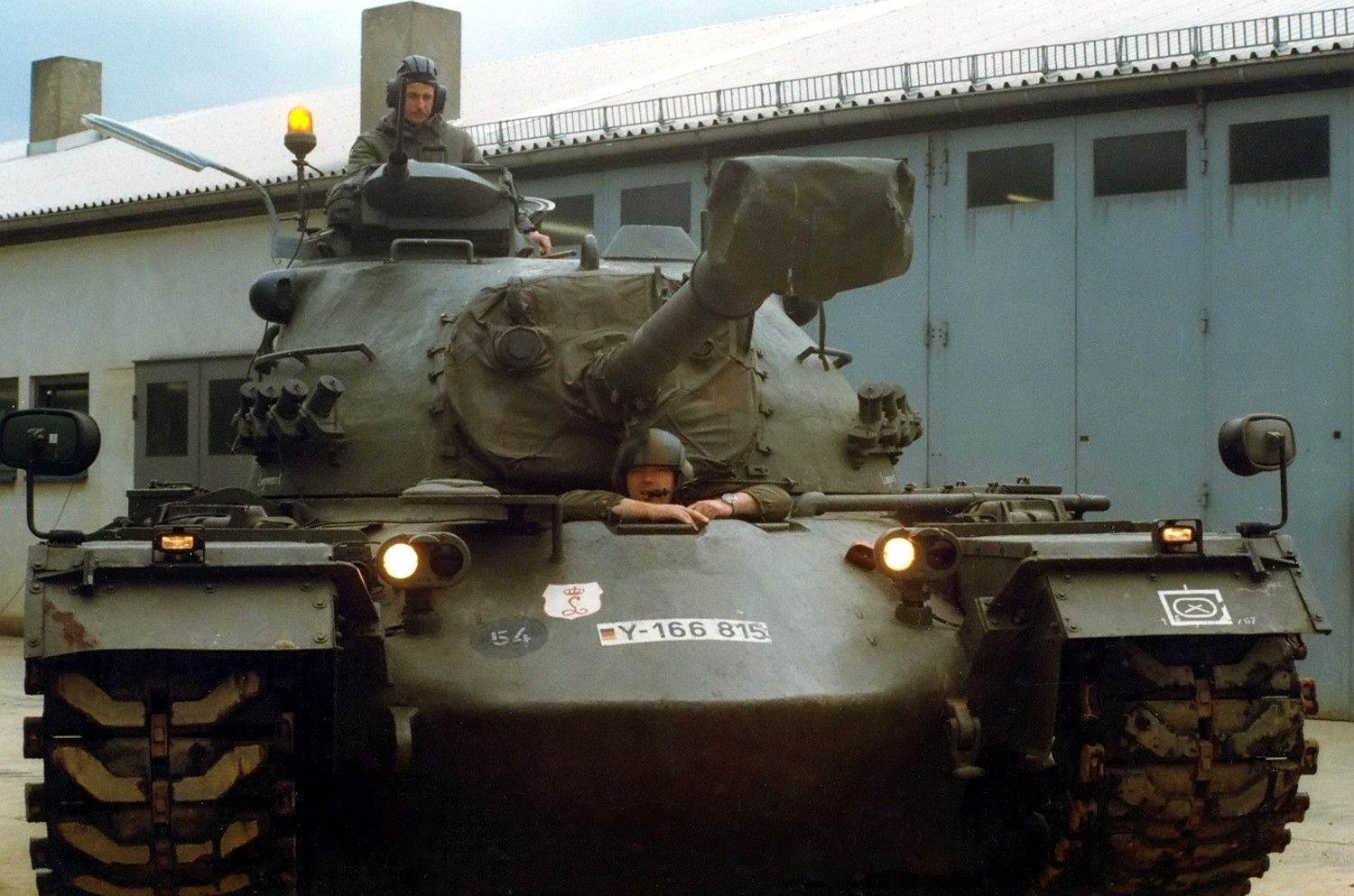
West German M48A2CGA1 during NATO exercise "REFORGER 85", 1985

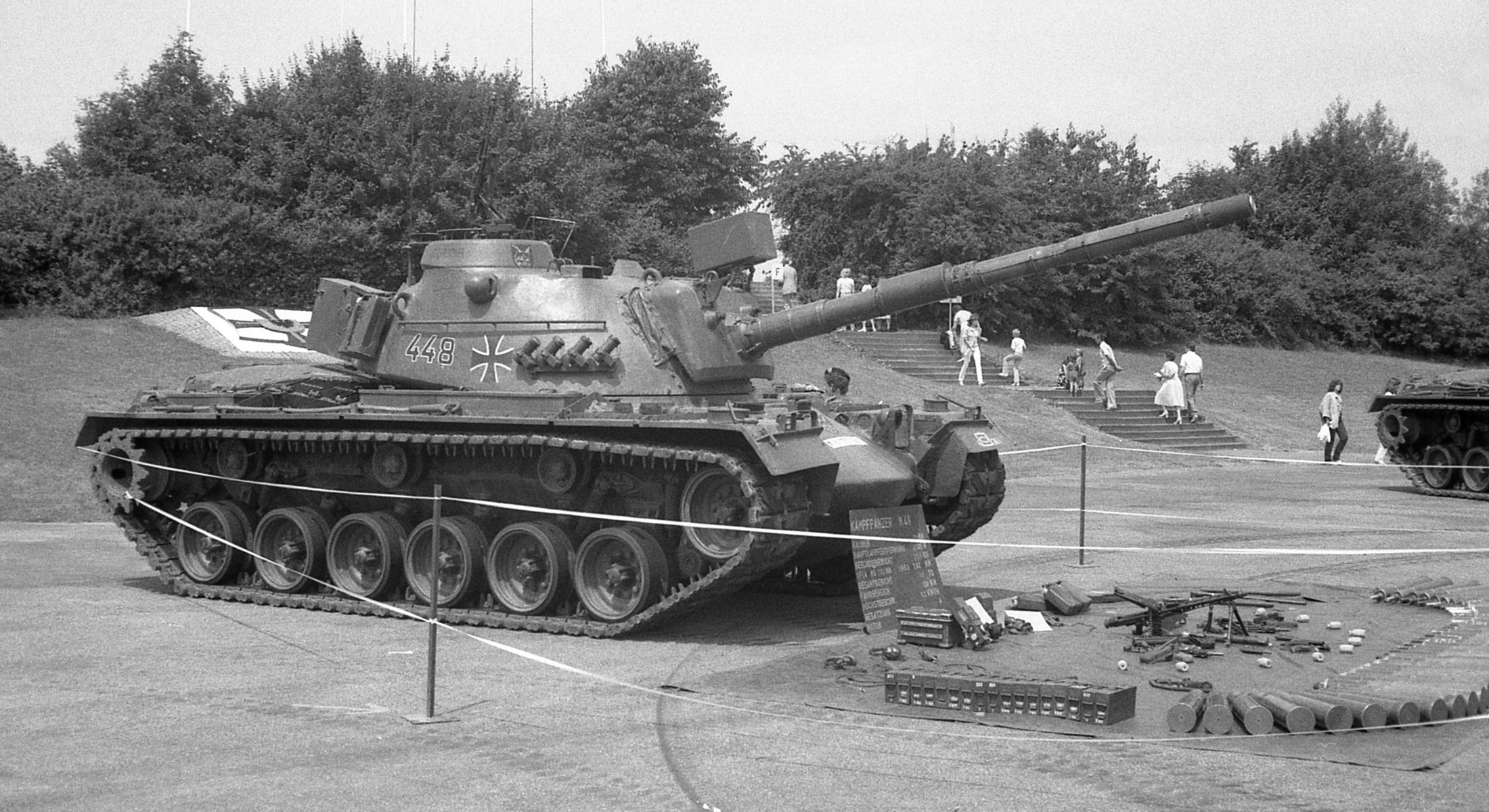
M48A2GA2 of 4./PzBtl 361 Külsheim in 1983

  - Kampfpanzer M48A2CGA1: West German M48A2/E48A armed with 90mm M41 main gun with a cylindrical blast deflector. Some were fitted with the M8 Bulldozer kit.
  - Kampfpanzer M48A2GA2: West German upgrade mounting L7A3 105mm cannon with new cast gun mantlet, circular cast commander's cupola, MG3 machine guns, and the same infrared night vision equipment as Leopard 1. 650 vehicles upgraded between 1978 and 1980.
  - M48 G Export: West German upgrade for export, similar to the M48A2GA2 and equipped with MTU MB-837 Ea-500 diesel engine. Turkey had its five M48A1 tanks upgraded in Germany and bought another 165 upgrade kits.
  - Super M48: West German modular upgrade offered in 1994 by Krauss Maffei and Wegmann and other partners for the M48A2/A3. Upgrades included Applique armor panels for the turret, NBC protection system, MOLF 48 fire control system, thermal sight, laser rangefinder, MTU MB-837 Ka-501 diesel engine and Renk RK304 automatic transmission. Armed with L7A3 105mm gun. Only 5 prototypes built.
- M48A5 MOLF: (Modular Laser Fire) Greek M48A5/E48C variant fitted with EMES-18 fire control system.
- Zulfiqar-1: Iranian modernized M48A3/A5 variant developed in the mid-1990s, armed with a Russian 2A46 125 mm smoothbore main gun.

== Operators ==
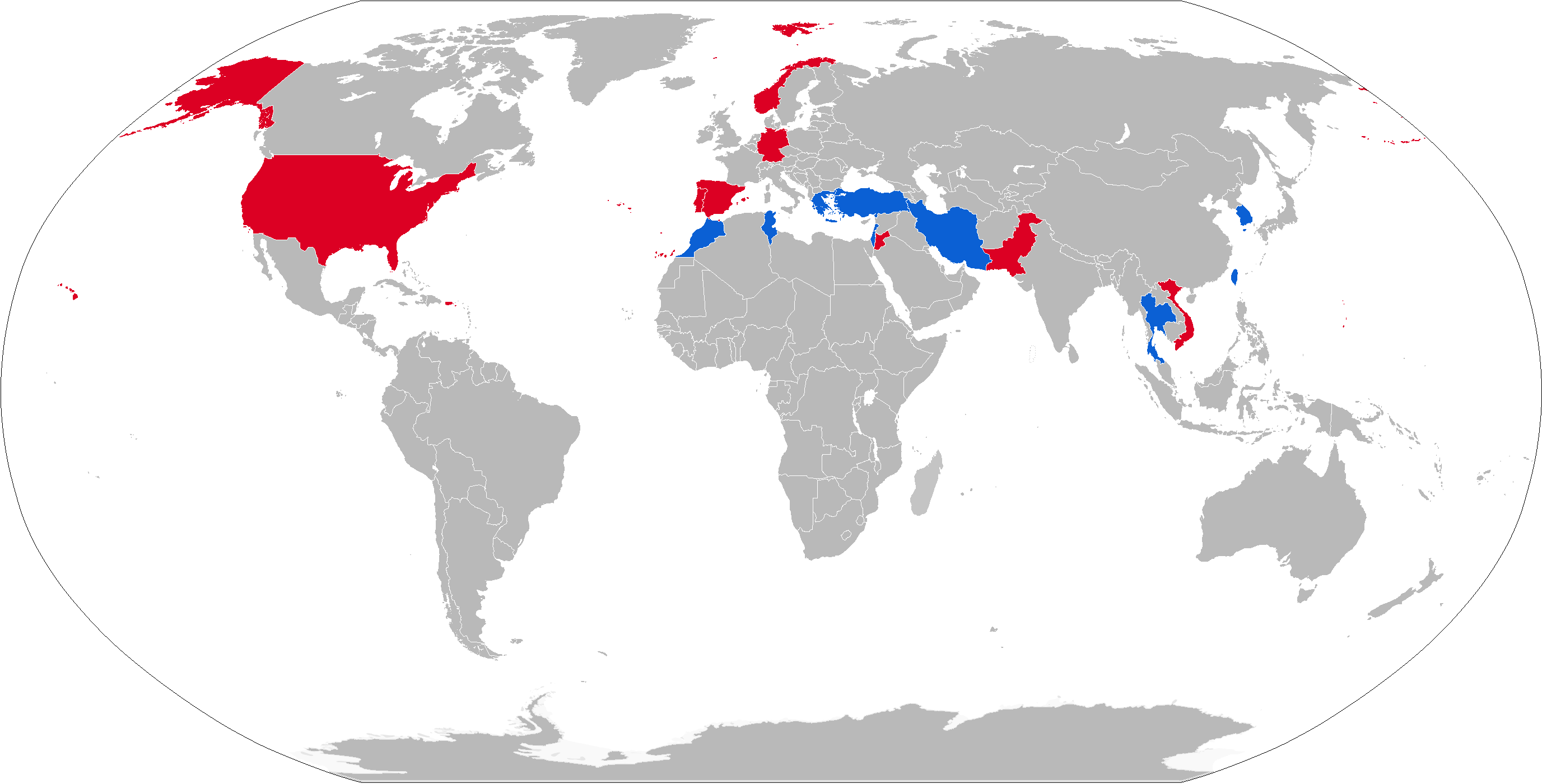
A map of M48 Patton operators Current Former

=== Current operators ===
Operators of main battle tank:

- Greece: 450 M48A5 MOLF.
- Iran
- Lebanon: 104 M48A5PI.
- Morocco: 225 M48A5PI.
- Somalia: M48A5T1/T2 tanks delivered from Turkey.
- Taiwan: 450 CM11, 100 CM12
- Thailand: 105 M48A5PI, notably used in the 2025 Cambodia–Thailand clashes.
- Turkey: 630 M48A5T2 in service. All other variants, 2,250 pieces including the 1,389 M48A5T1 are phased out of active service.

Operators of mine clearing tank Minenräumpanzer Keiler

- Germany: As of 2021, 24 Minenräumpanzer Keiler were in service.
- Poland: 4 Minenräumpanzer Keiler, transferred from Germany.

=== Former operators ===
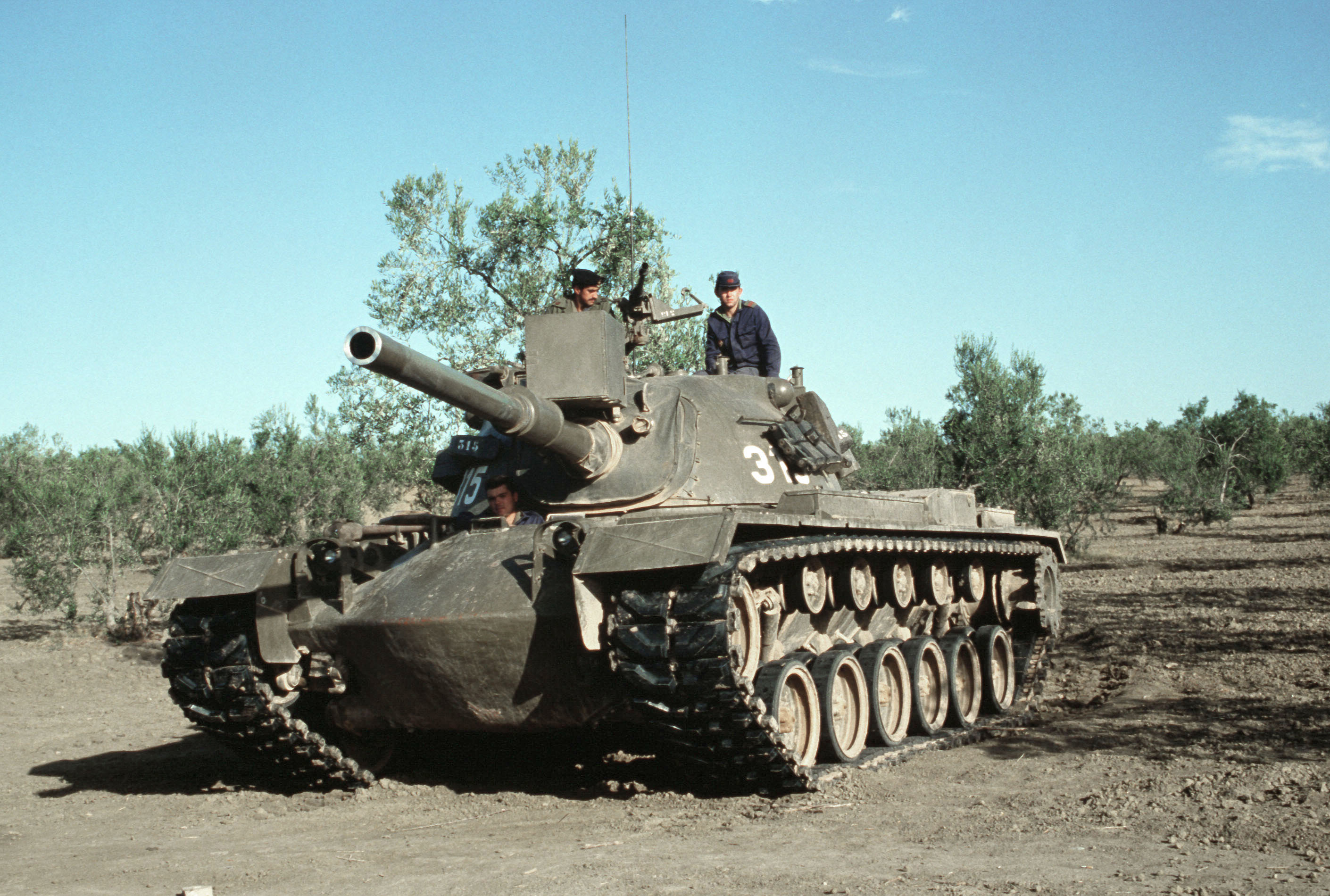
Spanish M48A5E in 1983.

- Belgium: Only M48 AVLBs.
- Germany: Used until 1993.
  - West Germany: 1,692 in active service, passed onto unified Germany.
- Iraq: Limited ad hoc use of captured Iranian tanks during Iran–Iraq War. Any remaining tanks scrapped after the war. It was never officially in Iraqi service.
- Israel: 561 Magach 5 Golan.
- Jordan: 200 M48A1.
- Norway: 38 M48, upgraded to M48A5 between 1982 and 1986. Additional 17 acquired in 1986. The M48 was phased out in 1993.
- Pakistan: 300 M48A5s retired from active service in 2002, currently in reserve.
- Portugal: 86 M48A5 received supplied by West Germany from 1977. Replaced by 93 US-supplied M60A3 TTS from 1993 and 37 Leopard-2A6 in the 2000s.
- South Korea: 200 M48A3Ks operated by Republic of Korea Marine Corps until 2023. 400 M48A5K1/K2/KW remained in service by the Republic of Korea Army until 2025, currently in reserve.
- Spain: 164 M48A5E.
- Taiwan: 309 M48A3 (Taiwanese variant).
- Tunisia: 28 M48A3.
- United States: Retired from combat use in 1973, by the Army National Guard in 1987, and from target use by 1994.
- Vietnam: M48A3s in strategic storage until 2010s.
  - North Vietnam: Limited ad hoc use of captured US and ARVN tanks during the Vietnam War.
  - South Vietnam: 271 M48A3's recorded in August 1974.

==== Non-state former operators ====
- Amal Movement: unknown number of M48A5 tanks loaned by the Shia 6th Infantry Brigade in 1988.
- Lebanese Forces: 7 M48A5s captured in 1984 from the Lebanese Army and returned in 1994.
- People's Liberation Army: 7 M48A5s captured in 1984 from the Lebanese Army and returned in 1993.
- South Lebanon Army: 7 M48A5s captured in 1984 from the Lebanese Army and returned in 2000.

== See also ==
- M46 Patton
- M47 Patton
- M60 tank
- M88 Recovery Vehicle – armoured recovery variant based on the M48 Patton/M60 Series tanks chassis and part of the automotive component.
- M103 heavy tank
- List of armoured fighting vehicles
- G-numbers – SNL G254

=== Tanks of comparable role, performance and era ===
- T-55 – a contemporary Soviet design
- Centurion – a contemporary British design
- Type 59 - a contemporary Chinese design
