= Grand Blanc Metal Center =

Coordinates: 42°55′59″N 83°38′40″W

The Grand Blanc Metal Center, also known as the Fisher Body Tank Plant, was a General Motors automotive body metal fabricating facility in Grand Blanc, Michigan. It was built to produce tanks, which it did in large numbers during World War II and the Cold War.

== History ==
The Factory opened in 1942 primarily as a facility for the manufacture of tanks. From April 1942 to May 1945 it produced 11,385 M4 Sherman tanks and roughly 1,190 M26 Pershing tanks from November 1944 to June 1945. With the end of World War II and the draw down in U.S. defense expenditures the plant ceased the manufacture of tanks and by 1947 Buick leased the plant as a storage facility. However, with the Cold War heating up in the early 1950s the plant again resumed the manufacture of tanks, producing 4,200 M48 Patton tanks by the time of its conversion to an automotive body metal fabricating facility in 1955. By the time of its closure in 2013 the plant was operating as a corporate-wide-weld-tooling center.

Much of the tooling and employees were relocated to a plant in Parma, Ohio.

It was alliteratively and popularly called the "Grand Blanc Tank Plant."
