= MBT-80 =

1970s experimental British tank

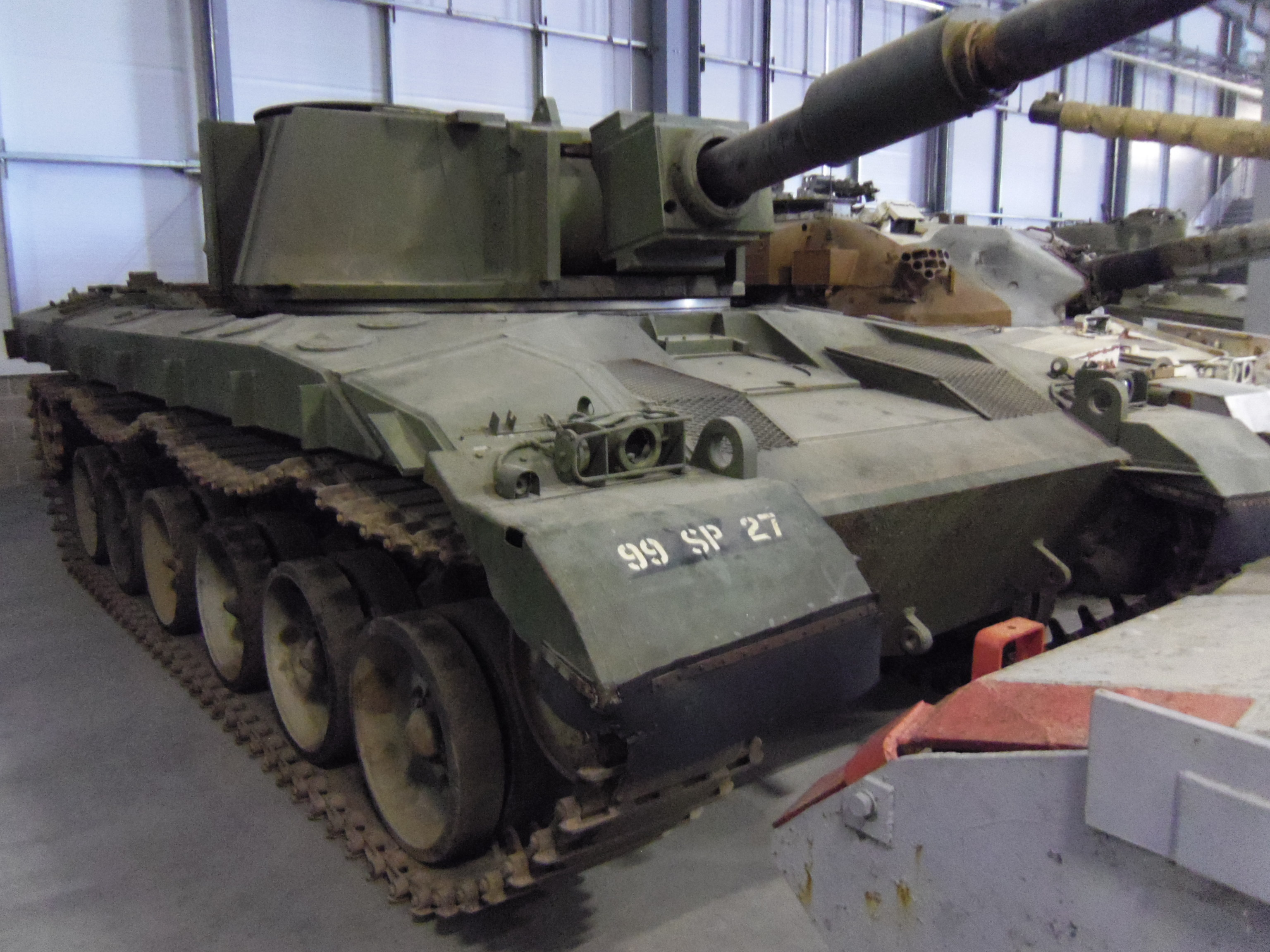
- Automotive test rig 2 (ATR-2) at the Bovington Tank Museum Vehicle Conservation Centre in 2014
- Type: Main battle tank
- Place of origin: United Kingdom

Service history
- In service: Never; 1989 (planned)

Production history
- Designer: Military Vehicles and Engineering Establishment
- Designed: 1979
- Manufacturer: ROF Leeds (planned)
- Unit cost: £1,000,000 Pounds Sterling estimate (September 1978)
- No. built: 17 prototypes (ATR1 & ATR2) (Note: Nine dedicated prototypes were scheduled to be delivered during the period April - October 1983.) (Note: Projected initial production run was 1,102 units, enough to replace all the Chieftain MBTs in front line service with the ten British Army tank regiments (8 Type A / 2 Type B) then equipped with them on a one to one basis.)

Specifications
- Mass: 55 tonnes, empty; 62 tonnes, fully loaded (crew, fuel, ammunition, armour package, etc.)
- Crew: 4 (commander, gunner, loader, driver)
- Armour: Chobham
- Main armament: RARDE (Note: Series production would have been handled by the Royal Ordnance Factories) EXP-28M1 120 mm split-block breach rifled gun
- Secondary armament: RSAF 7.62 mm L37A1 GPMG fitted to the commander's cupola
- Engine: Rolls-Royce Motors, Military Engine Division CV12 TCA Condor 12-cylinder diesel 1,500 hp
- Power/weight: 27 bhp/t
- Transmission: David Brown Gear Industries TN-38 automatic transmission
- Suspension: Hydropneumatic suspension (similar to the later Challenger MBT) (Note: A hydrogas based system developed by the MVEE in co-operation with Laser Engineering Ltd. (later became Air-Log Limited).)

The FV4601 MBT-80 (Note: Referred to in some contemporary documents as MBT/80, possibly to help differentiate it from the earlier FMBT.) was a British experimental third-generation main battle tank, designed in the late 1970s to replace the Chieftain tank. It was eventually (and later controversially) cancelled in favour of the Challenger 1, itself an evolution of the Chieftain design. (Note: An error exists in the source of the inline citation here. 1983 was the planned entry into service of the Challenger tank, but it did not enter even limited service with the British Army until late 1984.)

== History ==
By the early 1970s, there was a great disparity in the number of tanks being fielded by NATO and the Warsaw Pact in Europe. The US Army fielded the M60, while the British Army had introduced the Chieftain; both had been designed to counter the 100 mm gun of the T-54 and T-55, but neither could withstand the 115mm gun fielded on the T-62, let alone the newer 125mm gun of the T-64 and T-72.

By this point, the most heavily armed Western tank was the British Army's Chieftain, which entered service in April 1966. It mounted the 120 mm L11 rifled gun, giving it significantly greater anti-armour firepower than the 105 mm guns equipping other NATO tanks. However, the Chieftain also suffered from a number of technical shortcomings, particularly its underpowered engine and outdated suspension, which severely limited its cross-country mobility.

The same-era West German Leopard 1 and French AMX-30 were both very lightly armoured, reflecting the conclusion that heavy armour had little purpose in an era of rapidly improving high-explosive anti-tank (HEAT) weapons. Instead, both designs emphasized high mobility to outmanoeuvre slower-moving Soviet tanks and the early generation of anti-tank guided missiles, which were difficult to employ effectively against moving targets. This philosophy proved increasingly flawed as the number of Soviet tanks grew, making it impractical to outmanoeuvre massed armoured formations, while second-generation missiles made engaging moving targets much easier.

In 1963 the United States and West Germany started a joint project to develop a new tank to be used by both forces, the MBT-70. This combined the manoeuvrability of the Leopard with a spaced armour that would offer protection against 105 mm armour-piercing discarding sabot rounds while adding a new missile-firing gun able to engage Soviet tanks at very long range. By the late 1960s, the MBT-70 project had repeatedly overrun its development budget and the US Congress eventually cancelled it.

The Germans were still looking for a tank to replace their now outdated Leopards, as well as the many M48 Patton tanks they still had in service. The UK was looking for a more manoeuvrable design. A new joint program was formed between the UK and West Germany to develop a Future Main Battle Tank (FMBT). (Note: The design process of which was partly influenced, as would the later MBT-80, by a British study titled 'AFV for the 80's', in particular Stage 2, which dealt with the requirements for MBTs.) (Note: Ironically, this project was also semi-officially known as the MBT-80.) This was expected to replace the Chieftain tanks starting in the 1980s, as well as the older West German tanks. In 1977, Frederick Mulley, then Secretary of State for Defence, announced that, while both countries had agreed on the specifications of the joint tank, the replacement timetables diverged to such a degree that collaboration was not practicable at that time.

The cancellation of the MBT-70 had led the US to begin the development of its own design, the XM1. Prototypes arrived in 1976 with production slated for the late 1970s. Using the UK's new Chobham armour, it was emerging as a potent design. When carefully examined by the British Army, a number of issues became apparent. Notable was the 105 mm gun, which did not have the power to defeat the latest Soviet designs at long range, the preferred action for British tankers. Moreover, the armour package had been designed to defeat either the 115 mm firing armour-piercing fin-stabilized discarding sabot (APFSDS) or 125 mm firing high-explosive anti-tank (HEAT) rounds, but could not stop the 125 mm firing APFSDS at reasonable range.

Despite this, the desire to replace the Chieftain with a more mobile design remained, and there was some consideration given to importing XM1 hulls and turrets and then fitting them out with British-made components such as engine, transmission, and the 120 mm gun from the Chieftain on a domestic production line to produce a new tank. Reports on the XM1 were not favourable though.

Ultimately the UK instead officially began development of the MBT-80 in September 1978. (Note: In December 1978, during the project definition phase of the programme, it was proposed that the service name of the tank when it entered service would be Gladiator.)

This new project would build on work already carried out by the Military Vehicles and Engineering Establishment (MVEE) as far back as 1968, when they had produced a tank prototype with an external (unmanned) turret. (Note: The COMRES 75, based on a Comet chassis and mounting a 3.3 inch (83.8mm) tank gun with autoloader.) This was followed in 1978 by another tank prototype fitted with Chobham armour. This later prototype was based on the Chieftain design, and had the designation FV4211.

== Design ==
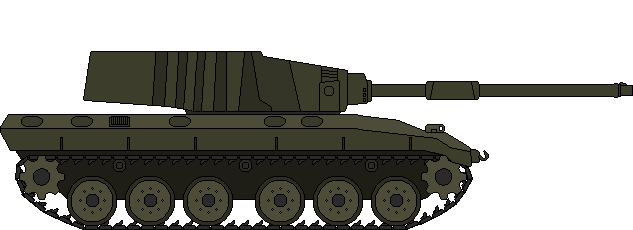
Drawing of the ATR-2 test rig for Shir and MBT-80

The MBT-80 was designed to counter all current and future armoured threats from the Eastern Bloc, combining a rifled gun, advanced composite armour and increased mobility onto one platform. Other design features included the use of a David Brown Gear Industries TN-38 transmission, a Sperry/Vickers stabilised panoramic sight for use by the tank commander, and an advanced vetronics suite incorporating Ferranti F100-L microprocessors. The MBT-80 would have also been the first operational British tank to have a crew compartment with a full environmental system; i.e. able to provide both heating, ventilation, and air conditioning for the crew. (Note: In the event, it would not be until the Challenger 2 tank was introduced that British tank crews would be able to enjoy the benefits of such a system.) (Note: While at least some members of the CVR (T) family including the Scorpion and Scimitar light tanks had an optional air conditioning system, it was apparently only ever procured by the various export customers.)

=== Armament ===
The main armament of the MBT-80 was to be a 120 mm rifled gun, the EXP-28M1, similar in some respects to the main guns found on the Chieftain and later the Challenger 1 and Challenger 2 main battle tanks, but a new design of its own. It was an advanced development of the Royal Ordnance L11A5 tank gun, designed by the Royal Armament Research and Development Establishment (RARDE), with a split-block breach mechanism. It was one of the first tank guns to use an Electro Slag Refined Steel (ESRS) barrel. This new barrel was intended to greatly increase the fatigue life of British 120mm tank guns. The technology had been cleared for use by new tank gun designs in 1976.

The fire-control system (FCS) would access and process relevant target, environment, and gun status data from various internal and external sensors including laser rangefinders and thermal imagers, to help the main gun hit targets accurately and consistently under more adverse conditions: "First shot, first kill". Major components of the FCS included the Fire Control Computer which was the 'brains' of the FCS, the Gun Control Equipment, and the STAMPLAR sight (see below), all of which were connected together by a fully digital databus. The FCS was also designed with built-in self-test diagnostics. The commander and gunner had duplicate turret/main gun controls, so either of them could aim and fire the main gun. Ammunition for the EXP-28M1 would have included armour-piercing fin-stabilized discarding sabot (APFSDS, APDS-T), high-explosive anti-tank (HEAT), high-explosive squash head (HESH), and smoke-white phosphorus rounds. (Note: A 120 mm APERS-T (Beehive anti-personnel round) was seemingly considered for development by the British.)

Secondary armament would have included a 7.62 mm L37A1 General Purpose Machine Gun mounted on the commander's cupola, which could be aimed and fired from within the tank. L2A1 "ball" and L5A1 tracer rounds would have been among the ammunition available for this weapon.

=== Protection ===
The MBT-80 was going to be protected mainly by the recently developed Chobham armour (Note: The Challenger 1 and 2 (initially in the case of the latter) were equipped with the second generation Chobham armour codenamed "Dorchester". If the MBT-80 had been continued, it is certain that it would have received this upgrade instead, likely prior to or early on in its initial production run.) (Note: Chobham armour in general has been described by some sources as effectively being a form of non-explosive reactive armor (NERA).) first fielded on the American M1 Abrams. The armour would have provided greater resistance against high explosive anti-tank (HEAT) rounds and kinetic energy penetrators. Thanks to the use of Chobham armour, it was anticipated that much greater use could be made of high grade aluminium alloy in the construction of the hull (the turret was steel) than in prior tank designs, helping to keep down the overall weight of the tank and therefore improve mobility and associated logistics, not to mention transportation of the tank to where it would be needed. The tank would also have had among other protection features a full active NBC defences, something that was becoming more common on military vehicles being designed and/or introduced in the late 1970s and early 1980s. This included both advanced NBC sensors and radiation/electromagnetic interference (including electromagnetic pulse) shielding to help protect the crew and vehicle systems. (Note: The tank's Chobham armour would have given excellent protection on its own against most radiation threats, including near misses by standard tactical nuclear weapons. It would have been less effective against battlefield enhanced radiation weapons that had begun to enter Soviet service, due to the interaction of such weapons with the depleted uranium component of the armour.) An extensive electronic warfare system including a dedicated electronic counter-countermeasure ability was also to be included. This system would have incorporated various countermeasures against such threats as a rocket-propelled grenade (RPG) or anti-tank guided missile (ATGM), 1st through 3rd generation.

As a thermal signature management measure, the exhaust gases from the Rolls-Royce CV12 TCA Condor engine would have been mixed with cooling air before being discharged outside the tank. This feature was also used on the Vickers Valiant MBT.

Mounted on the sides of the turret would have been two L8A1 six-barrelled 66 mm smoke grenade dischargers, the same British system was used as the M250 grenade launchers found on early models of the M1 Abrams.

=== Mobility ===
The MBT-80 was to have a longer range, more mobility, and greater speed than prior tanks. Two options were considered; the Honeywell AGT1500 gas turbine engine used by the United States's prototype XM1 Abrams tank, producing 1,500 hp, and a modified, turbocharged version of the Rolls-Royce CV12 diesel engine, also producing 1,500 hp. The CV12 was eventually picked, mainly because the AGT1500 would need substantial modification of the tank to suit the transmission that came with the engine, which had been specially designed for the XM1. The higher fuel use of the gas turbine engine was also a factor in choosing the diesel engine. The CV12 was expected to be produced at Rolls-Royce's Shrewsbury plant.

=== Sensors ===
Known sensors included:

- Sperry/Vickers stabilised sight for tank commander – Daytime sight only with ×1–10 magnification.
- PANTILI (Panoramic, Thermal Imager, Laser Integrated Sight) – 360 degree rotating thermal imager fitted with a (CO_{2}) laser rangefinder. Accessible to both commander & gunner. Similar in concept to the hunter-killer sight found on the later Challenger 2 tank.
- Two-axis stabilised monocular gunners sight incorporating a laser rangefinder and muzzle reference system, magnification ×2–3 and ×10. (Note: May also have had a low light ability, but this is unconfirmed.) Backup telescope with ×8 magnification also provided.
- Driver's thermal imager – possibly the Barr & Stroud IR18 TVFS but this is unconfirmed. The IR18 was later used as part of the Challenger 1's TOGS (Thermal Observation and Gunnery Sight) system.
- STAMPLAR (Sight, Thermal, Armoured, Periscope, LAser Rangefinder) – Part of the fire control system. Directly tied into the Fire Control Computer via a digital databus.
- Roof-mounted infra-red detector – Part of the NBC defence suite, it could detect airborne chemical weapon agents and radioactive nuclear fallout. Later available as an option on the Chieftain 900 tank.

== Versions and variants ==
Among the projected vehicles based on the MBT-80 chassis were a self-propelled anti-aircraft weapon (gun: SPAAG) using the turret of the Flakpanzer Gepard, an armoured vehicle-launched bridge (AVLB), and an armoured recovery vehicle (ARV). None of these had progressed beyond the concept stage at the time of the programme's unexpected cancellation.

== Cancellation ==
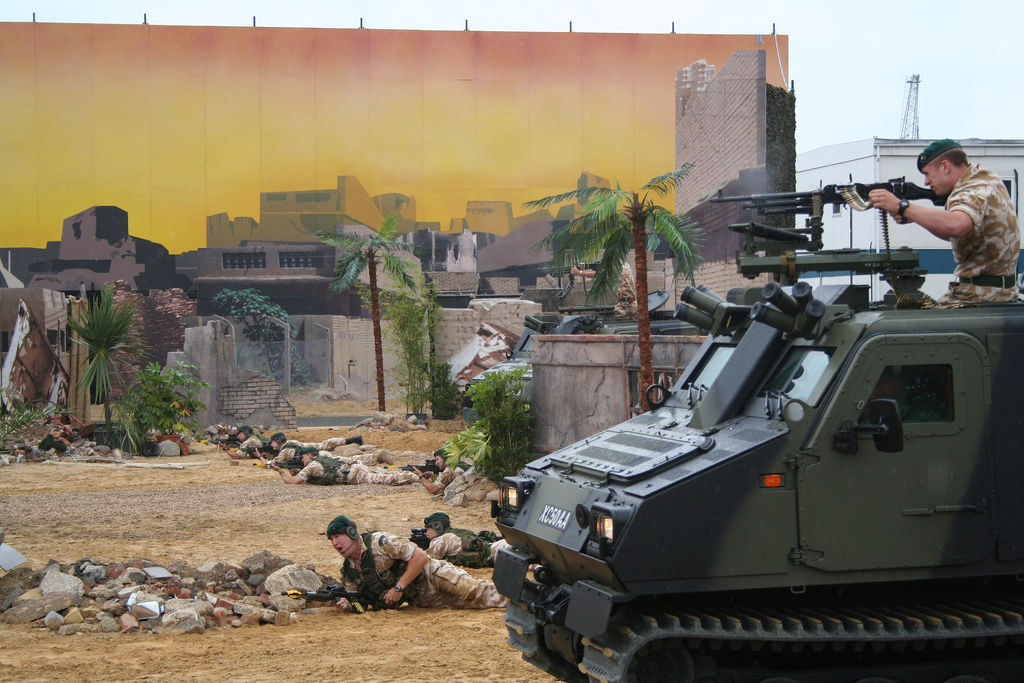
Viking Armoured Vehicle of the Royal Marines during a demonstration at the Portsmouth International Festival in 2005.

In the aftermath of the Iranian Revolution, all orders for weapons from the United Kingdom were cancelled, including those for Shir 2 tanks. The British war industry was reliant on the Iranian market, forcing the government to cut the number of workers at ROF Leeds. The government was looking into how they could still retain the skill and capacity at Leeds that would be needed to produce the next generation of main battle tanks. Despite attempts to put the tank into production quickly, it would not be until the mid-1980s that the MBT-80 would be ready for production, even if development was drastically accelerated. There were increasing worries that Soviet tank technology was advancing at such a rate that new designs, such as the T-80, reportedly about to enter service would make obsolete extant front line British MBTs far sooner than predicted. The programme was cancelled in favour of the Challenger, which had been developed from the Shir 2 as a private venture and would be in theory available for service by 1983 to replace the Chieftain tanks instead. (Note: In practice though, it would not be until late 1984 that the British Army, in the form of the Royal Tank Regiment, would receive its first Challengers. Even then it was not remotely a mature or indeed fully operational design, enduring in service numerous embarrassing and often expensive shortcomings and failures that persisted right up to the eve of battle in the Gulf War of 1991, Operation Granby. Despite the first of an initial batch of 237 Challengers being completed on the production line at ROF Leeds in March of 1983, none were judged ready for delivery to operational units that year.)

With its adoption as an official programme, the Challenger was also known for a time as the MBT-85. (Note: This designation had apparently been used on and off since 1969 for studies and projects.) Various research elements of the MBT-80 programme were continued to develop and mature advanced technology for the next generation of British MBTs to enter service in the early 1990s, the design of which was to be provided by the new MBT-95 programme, launched in late 1982. In the event though, the MBT-95 was superseded by the Challenger 2 programme in 1987 that seemed to indicate an urgent need for a replacement tank in the near term, and not just to replace the remaining Chieftains as originally planned. (Note: At the time it was set aside in favor of the Challenger 2, MBT-95 had evolved into MVEE's highly promising Evolutionary National Tank concept. This had a three man crew and was armed with a 140 mm gun fed by a carousel autoloader.) A competition (the Chieftain Replacement Programme) was held, with the competing designs being the Challenger 2 (given the interim name 'Improved Challenger'), the Abrams, the Leclerc, and the Leopard 2. The result was never really in any doubt, despite some strong internal opposition to continued procurement of the Challenger series, in part due to financial and political considerations and partly due to the unexpectedly poor performance of the original Challenger in early trials, exercises and the like. (Note: Such as the poor showing at the 1987 Canadian Army Trophy) The Challenger 2 was not officially chosen as the British Army's new tank until late 1991, by which time the Challenger 1's problems had been resolved, with it having an excellent operational record in the Gulf War.

The MBT-80 was planned for development to be completed in 1987 and production by 1989. By 1989 the Challenger tank at the same point in time, despite having been in production for nearly seven years and officially in service for over four of those, was widely considered to be still not fully operational. (Note: This not only had already resulted in the initiation in 1988 of the Challenger Replacement Programme [Staff Requirement (Land) 4026] but would also result in the interim in remediation/upgrade efforts such as the CHARM gun/shell upgrade programme and the Gulf War era Jericho I & II crash programmes.)

== Surviving vehicles ==
Two test rigs were built to test the various systems that would be used in the planned MBT-80. The first, Automotive Test Rig 1 (ATR1), had a hull assembled from Shir 2 prototypes derived from the Chieftain, removable blocks of armour that either contained Chobham or steel designed to imitate it, and a dummy tank gun. It could also move under its own propulsion. ATR1 fell into the hands of a private collector but is currently in bad condition. The second rig, ATR2, was designed to test the ability to weld aluminium and steel tank hulls together to reduce weight. It also had a different turret design from the ATR1 and possesses advanced sights that were state-of-the-art at the time of construction. ATR2 is currently displayed in the Vehicle Conservation Centre of the Bovington Tank Museum in Dorset.

== See also ==
- MBT-70
- British Army of the Rhine
- SPRITE infrared detector
- Pilkington Optronics
- Bhangmeter
- Fulda Gap
- T-64
- T-72
- Group of Soviet Forces in Germany
