= Longcross Studios =

Film and television production facility in Surrey, England

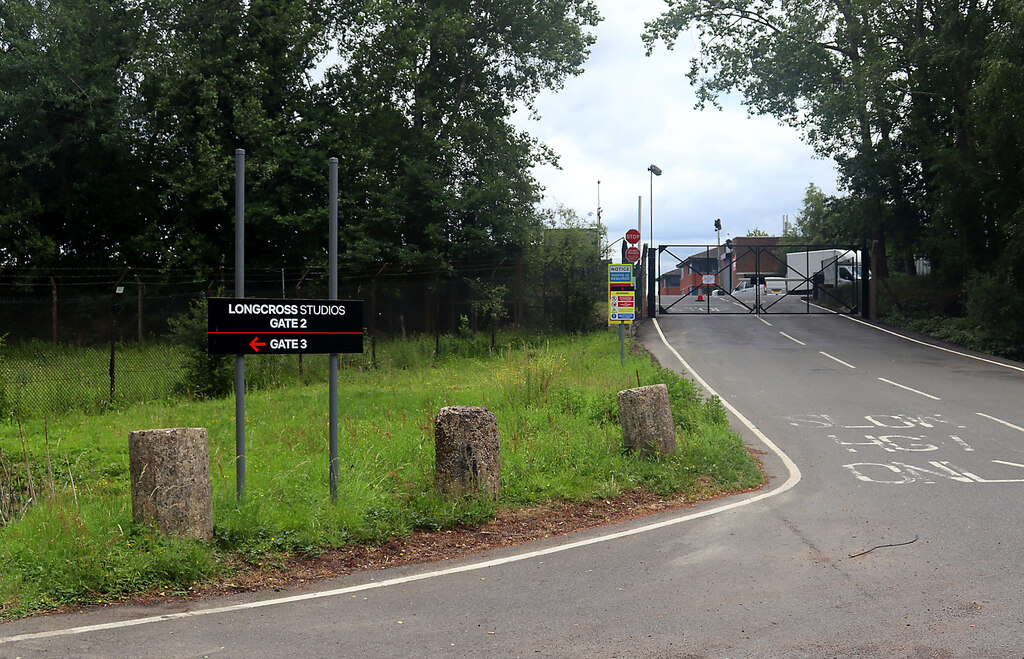
- Longcross Studios Gate 2

General information
- Location: Longcross, England, Longcross, Chertsey, Surrey, KT16 0EE
- Coordinates: 51.38175°N 0.592833°W
- Opening: 2006
- Owner: Aviva Investors

Website
- Longcross South Studios

Longcross Film Studios is a film and television production facility in Longcross, Surrey, approximately 25 miles (40 km) west of central London. Built on the site of the Military Vehicles and Engineering Establishment, the studio began operations in 2006.

The studio features four main sound stages ranging from 13,000 to 47,000 square feet (1,200 to 4,400 m^{2}), eight "meganova" sound stages, 200 acres of backlot, a two-and-a-quarter mile test track, and an off-road course.

In 2021, Netflix signed a long-term lease deal with Aviva Investors to expand operations and invest in Longcross Studios.

== Background ==
The studios are built on the site of a 150-year-old manor house in Chobham Common. From 1942 to 2005 the site was used by Military Vehicles and Engineering Establishment for the production and testing of military vehicles and innovations such as Chobham Armour.

In 2005, the site was purchased by construction company Crest Nicholson and asset management company Aviva Investors. Longcross Studios began operations the following year and has since hosted a wide range of film and television productions, including the James Bond film Skyfall (2012), ITV crime drama Broadchurch (2013-17), and the Marvel Studios production Doctor Strange in The Multiverse of Madness (2022).

The rise of streaming services such as Disney+, Netflix, and Amazon Prime and the increased demand for original content has led to a spike in demand for production real estate and sound stages. In order to respond to the demand, Longcross Studios has built a new type of sound stages with Serious Stages, a concert stage and temporary building construction company. The "meganova" and "Space" stages are built to purpose and can be built in three months versus 12–18 months of traditional sound stages. A number of productions are already taking advantage of the new stages, including the upcoming Mission Impossible films.

In 2021, Netflix and Aviva Investors signed a deal to expand operations and invest in stages and facilities at Longcross Studios. Aviva Investors also acquired the remaining £45 million ($61.5m) stake from Crest Nicholson.

== List of Longcross Studios Productions ==
=== Film ===
- The Descent Part 2 (2009)
- Clash of the Titans (2010)
- Green Zone (2010)
- Hugo (2011)
- War Horse (2011)
- Wrath of the Titans (2012)
- John Carter (2012)
- Skyfall (2012)
- Captain Phillips (2013)
- Fast & Furious 6 (2013)
- Jack the Giant Slayer (2013)
- Rush (2013)
- Thor: The Dark World (2013)
- World War Z (2013)
- Guardians of the Galaxy (2014)
- Victor Frankenstein (2015)
- Alice Through the Looking Glass (2016)
- Assassin's Creed (2016)
- Doctor Strange (2016)
- Kingsman: The Golden Circle (2017)
- Murder on the Orient Express (2017)
- Star Wars: The Last Jedi (2017)
- Aladdin (2019)
- Angel Has Fallen (2019)
- The Gentlemen (2019)
- Artemis Fowl (2020)
- The King's Man (2021)
- Death on the Nile (2022)
- Doctor Strange in the Multiverse of Madness (2022)
- Mission: Impossible – Dead Reckoning Part One (2023)
- The Marvels (2023)
- Mission: Impossible – The Final Reckoning (2025)
- Star Wars: Starfighter (2027)
- Untitled Luther film (TBA)

=== Television ===
- Dead Set (2008)
- Law & Order: UK (2010)
- Call the Midwife (2012–present)
- Broadchurch (2015)
- Andor (2022-25)
- Secret Invasion (2023)
