= Longcross =

Village in Surrey, England

Coordinates: 51.378°N 0.585°W

- Location within Surrey
- Population: 943 (approx.) (2011 Census)
- District: Runnymede
- Shire county: Surrey
- Region: South East
- Country: England
- Sovereign state: United Kingdom
- Post town: Chertsey
- Postcode district: KT16
- Dialling code: 01932
- Police: Surrey
- Fire: Surrey
- Ambulance: South East Coast
- UK Parliament: Runnymede and Weybridge

Longcross is a village in the Borough of Runnymede in Surrey, England, approximately 34.6 kilometres (21.5 mi) west of central London. Its name is thought to come from a marker, placed where the parish boundaries of Chertsey, Chobham and Egham met.

== Description ==
South Longcross consists of large houses along one long, hilly road with a few closes. North Longcross has two, adjoining, scheduled for early 2020s-final phase completion housing estates including Upper Longcross on a shorter road before the next settlement, the south of Virginia Water, Trumps Green which is an older mixture of former workers' cottages, a little semi-detached stock, large houses and public woodland. The village is otherwise very buffered however has a transport link: its rail station on the Waterloo to Reading Line. All of its clusters are between Virginia Water, Sunningdale, Windlesham, Ottershaw and Chobham. It is bisected by the M3 motorway (which is unusually in a large cutting) into north and south components.

== Politics and demography ==
In the local return of a panel of three councillors per ward of 5,000-6,000 people (see apportionment) its electoral ward is Foxhills (an estate towards Lyne, once the seat of John Ivatt Briscoe). It comprises Longcross together with Lyne, Ottershaw and Addlestone.

In 2011 the village was again, for equal population of units (or half-sized units) purposes, split into three Output Areas totalling two and a half typical size, by taking in a small part of Ottershaw and of Wentworth Estate. These areas had a total population of 943 people.

== History ==
Longcross's church is Christ Church; it is a redundant church registered for disposal and the parish has re-merged with the parish of Lyne, itself a relatively late breakaway from Chertsey, but longer a chapelry. The church is a Grade II listed building of mid-Victorian (1847) origin comprising a nave, west porch, chancel, north organ chamber, and vestry. It is built of red brick with slate roofs.

For a long time there was a Ministry of Defence presence in Longcross. In World War II, the Military Vehicles and Engineering Establishment was built to the north of the village, where armoured vehicles were designed and tested. Now no longer used for its original purpose, the site was sold by QinetiQ, and is now the site of Longcross Film Studios, where the James Bond film Skyfall and several other films have been made since 2010.

== Facilities ==
Longcross has few public facilities of its own; exceptions include the Old School café, boarding kennels and serviced offices. The café has been a family-run business for 50 years. There is no village centre, pub, or green. It is a dispersed village. By virtue of its farms, Chertsey lays claim to be the only predominantly London commuter town with an annual agricultural show. The show has since lost its agricultural component.

=== Public transport ===
Train services from Longcross railway station to and from London Waterloo are operated by South Western Railway. The station adjoins the North or Upper Longcross development, a large new Garden village constructed in the late 2010s and early 2020s.

The railway station, linked by footpaths to the new North/Upper Longcross estates and at Burma Road, has been upgraded in services from a very minor (seldom) stop on the London Waterloo to Reading line to a normal minor stop. The next station with regular services is Virginia Water, being a major stop on this main line and a branch line.

No part of this hilly area of land has bus services — the far east of Longcross is 1 mile (1.6 km) across sparse footpaths from services to Woking and Chertsey.

== Today ==
Longcross Road has a partial footway, otherwise sandy mud verges, at one point reduced by trees and hill crest to nothing meaning South Longcross is hard to traverse on foot. The road leading NNE into Trumps Green has footways and short section of normal verge, making Trumps Green an easy walk from the station/north area.

A large portion of Longcross is taken up by the Longcross Estate, currently owned by Mohammed bin Rashid Al Maktoum. There are public footpaths and bridleways leading through the estate and onto Chobham Common, which spans from the south-west to the south-east of the village.

On 2 January 2017, it was announced that Longcross was to be one of the sites of the government's proposed garden villages, ideally having around 5,000 new homes. A generous road expansion to the existing road to Trumps Green has been given, and the sites are served by rail and road with spare capacity.
