= M250 =

M250 can refer to:

- M250 series, a Japanese freight train type
- Allison Model 250, a British aircraft engine
- M250 grenade launcher, an American grenade launcher
- Lotus M250, a cancelled two-seat sports car concept
- M250, an American belt-fed machine gun
