= LNG (disambiguation) =

LNG, or liquefied natural gas, is a form of natural gas for easier storage and transport.

LNG or lng may also refer to:

- Levonorgestrel, a hormonal medication used for birth control
- Lateral nuclear group, a group of thalamic nuclei
- Lombardic language (ISO 639-3 code: lng)
- Longcross railway station (National Rail code: LNG)
- Cheniere Energy, NYSE symbol LNG
