= Aviva Investors =

Asset management company

- Formerly: Morley
- Type: Subsidiary
- Industry: Investment management
- Founded: 1971
- Headquarters: London, UK
- Key people: Mark Versey (CEO)
- AUM: £273 billion (2026)
- Parent: Aviva
- Website: avivainvestors.com

Aviva Investors is an investment management company and is part of the Aviva group. Founded in 1971 as Geoffrey Morley and Partners, the firm has undergone mergers and ownership changes as part of the Aviva group. The company has been active in infrastructure and renewable-energy investment, including biomass and wind projects.

== History ==
The London unit, previously known as Morley, was founded in 1971 as Geoffrey Morley and Partners. This was bought by Globe Investment in 1988 and then sold to Commercial Union, before being absorbed into CGU and then Aviva plc.

The Central Bank of Ireland fined Aviva Investors in July 2011 for failing to have proper controls and procedures surrounding the safeguarding of client assets.

The company has made significant investments in biomass and wind energy. Some of the investments, e.g. the Barry docks incinerator, have attracted local and national opposition, due to the increase in pollution.

In September 2021, Aviva Investors signed a long-term lease deal with Netflix to operate and expand the Longcross Studios.
