= Gracious Pond =

Nature reserve in Surrey, United Kingdom

Coordinates: 51.365°N 0.584°W

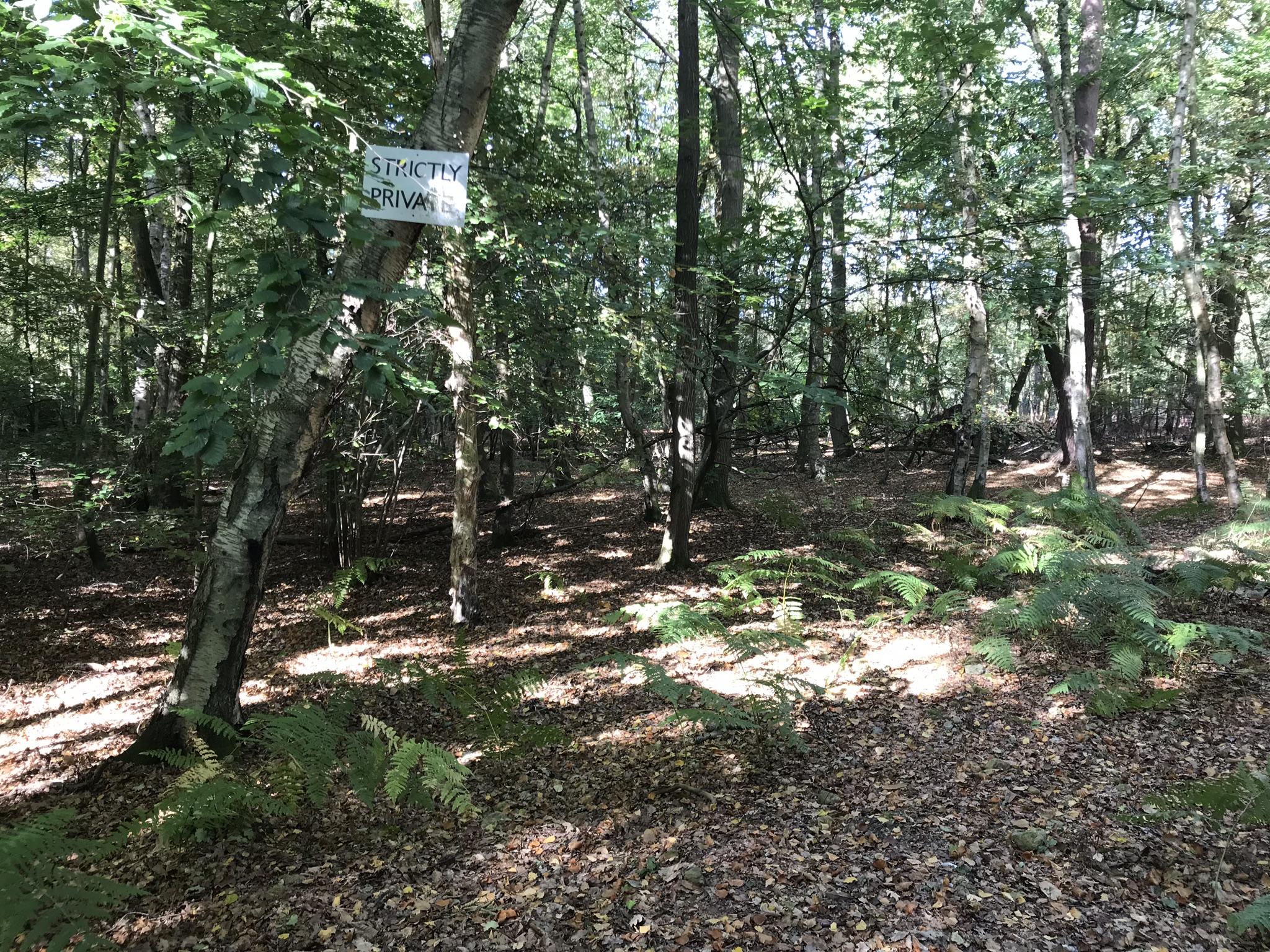
- Interactive map of Gracious Pond
- Type: Nature reserve
- Location: Chobham, Surrey
- OS grid: SU 987 638
- Area: 14 hectares (35 acres)
- Manager: Surrey Wildlife Trust

Gracious Pond is a 14-hectare (35-acre) nature reserve in Chobham in Surrey. It is managed by the Surrey Wildlife Trust. It is part of Chobham Common Site of Special Scientific Interest.

This site has heath, wet woodland and ponds. Fauna include common toad and raft spiders, which can run on water. There are heathland plants such as round-leaved sundew and trees include beeches.

There is no public access.
