= Chobham armour =

British-designed composite tank armour

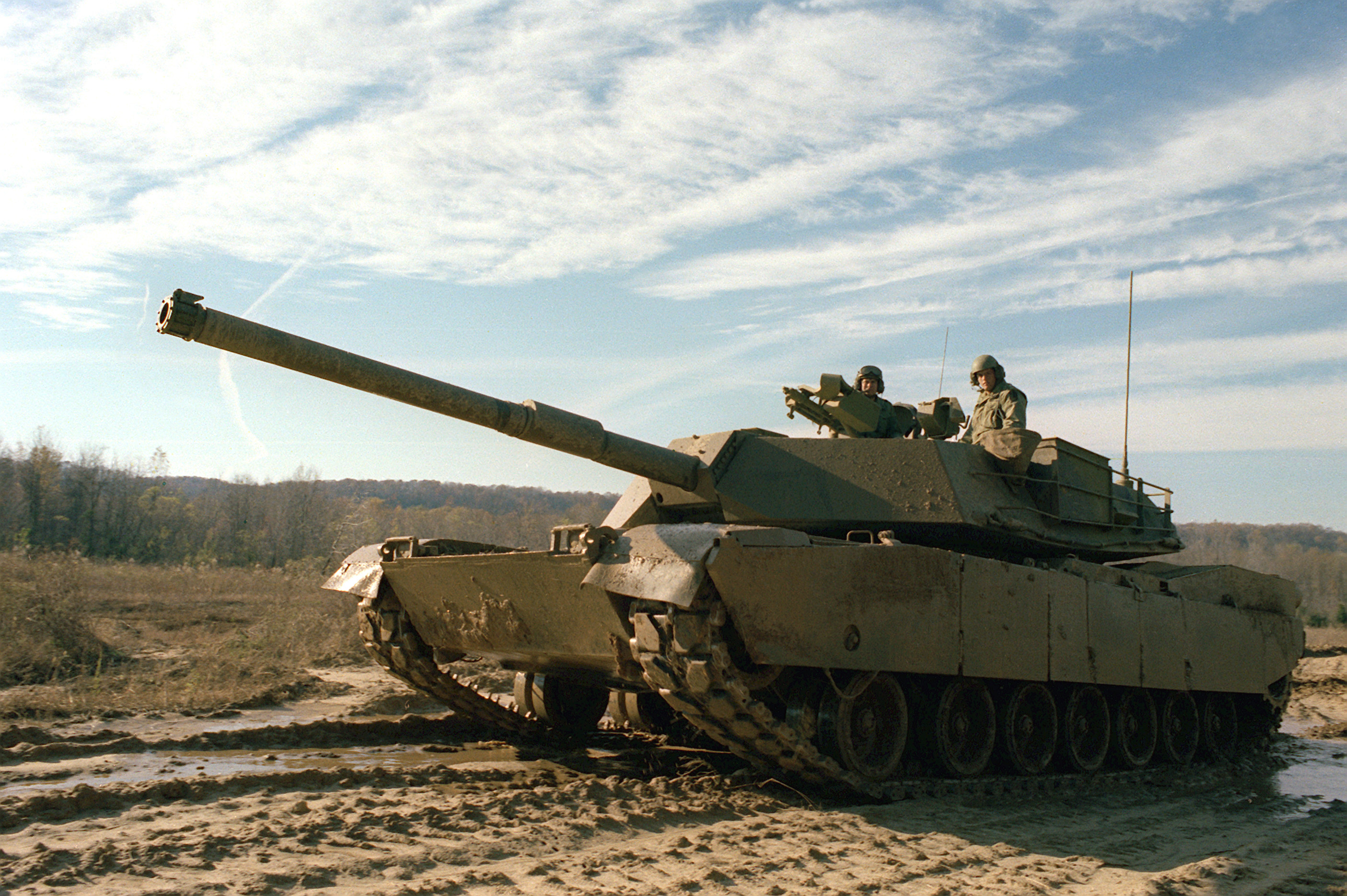
An American XM1 Abrams of the pre-series, the first main battle tank type to be protected by Chobham armour

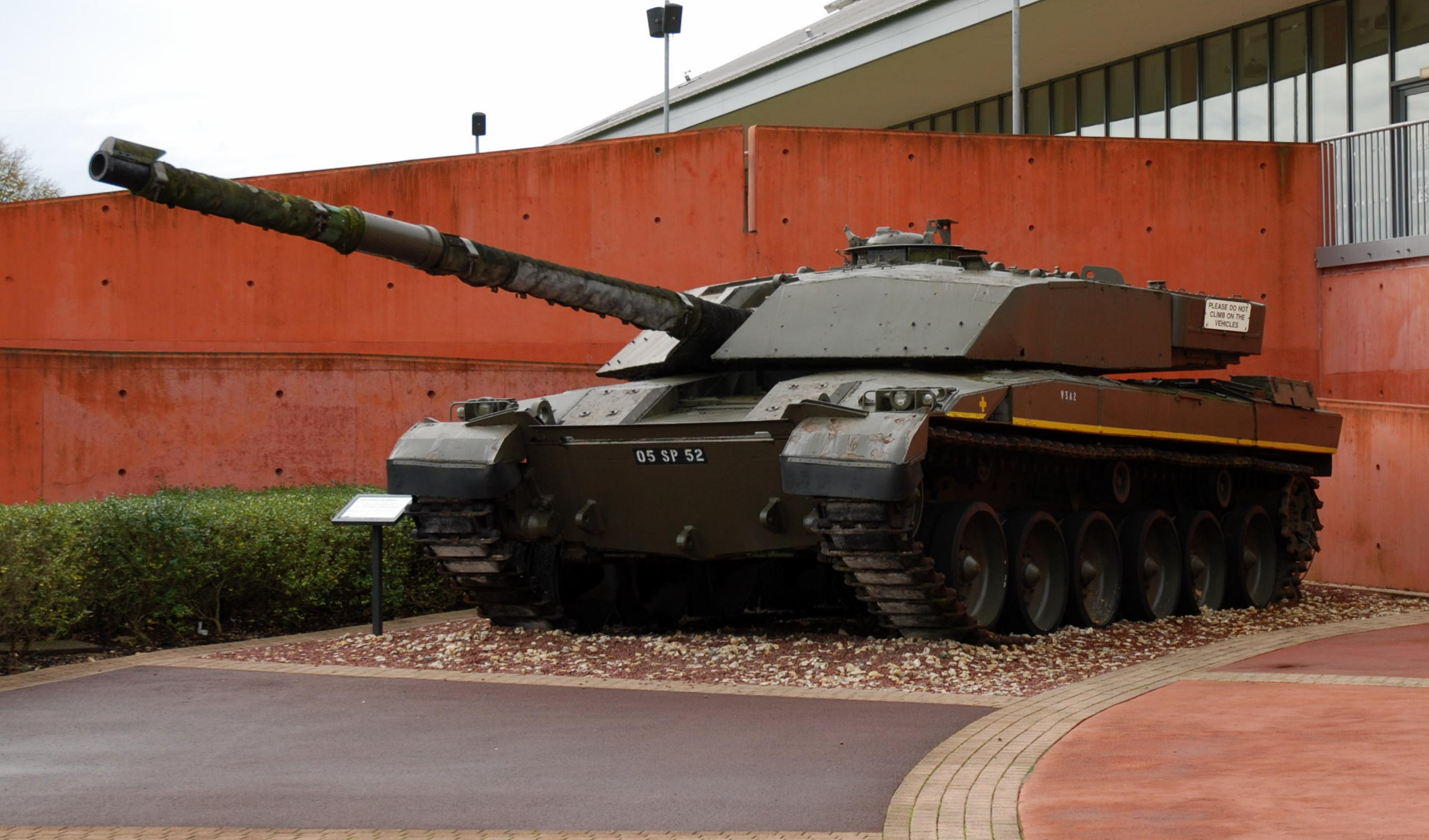
The British Army's Challenger 1 was the second main battle tank to use Chobham armour

Chobham armour is the informal name of a composite armour developed in the 1960s at the Military Vehicles and Engineering Establishment, a British tank research centre on Chobham Lane in Chertsey. The name has since become the common generic term for composite ceramic vehicle armour. Other names informally given to Chobham armour include Burlington and Dorchester. Special armour is a broader informal term referring to any armour arrangement comprising sandwich reactive plates, including Chobham armour.

Within the Ministry of Defence (MoD), Chobham usually refers specifically to the non-explosive reactive armor and ceramic composites, while Dorchester is usually in reference to additional armour packages, primarily composed of explosive reactive armour and spaced armour, although these are often conflated when in colloquial usage.

Although the construction details of the Chobham armour remain a secret, it has been described as being composed of ceramic tiles encased within a metal framework and bonded to a backing plate and several elastic layers. Owing to the extreme hardness of the ceramics used, they offer superior resistance against shaped charges such as high-explosive anti-tank (HEAT) rounds and they shatter kinetic energy penetrators.

The armour was first tested in the context of the development of a British prototype vehicle, the FV4211, and first applied on the preseries of the American M1. Only the M1 Abrams, Challenger 1, Challenger 2, and K1 88-Tank have been disclosed as being thus armoured. The framework holding the ceramics is usually produced in large blocks, giving these tanks, and especially their turrets, a distinctive angled appearance.

== Protective qualities ==
Due to the extreme hardness of the ceramics used, the tiles offer superior resistance against a shaped charge jet and they shatter kinetic energy penetrators (KE-penetrators). The (pulverised) ceramic also strongly abrades any penetrator. Against lighter projectiles, the hardness of the tiles causes a shatter gap effect: a higher velocity will, within a certain velocity range (the gap), not lead to a deeper penetration but destroy the projectile instead.

Because the ceramic is so brittle, the entrance channel of a shaped charge jet is not smooth—as it would be when penetrating a metal—but ragged, causing extreme asymmetric pressures which disturb the geometry of the jet (on which its penetrative capabilities are critically dependent as its mass is relatively low). This initiates a vicious circle as the disturbed jet causes still greater irregularities in the ceramic, until in the end it is defeated. The newer composites, though tougher, optimise this effect as tiles made with them have a layered internal structure conducive to it, causing "crack deflection". This mechanism, using a jet's own energy against it, has caused the effects of Chobham to be compared to those of reactive armour.

This should not be confused with the effect used in non-explosive reactive armour: that of sandwiching an inert but soft elastic material such as rubber, between two armour plates. The impact of either a shaped charge jet or armour-piercing fin-stabilized discarding sabot (APFSDS) kinetic energy (KE) long rod penetrators, after the first layer has been perforated and while the rubber layer is being penetrated will cause the rubber to deform and expand, so deforming both the back and front plates. Both attack methods will suffer from obstruction to their expected paths, so experience a greater thickness of armour than there is nominally, thus lowering penetration. Also for rod penetrations, the transverse force experienced due to the deformation may cause the rod to shatter, bend, or only change its path, again lowering penetration.

All versions of Chobham armour have incorporated a large volume of non-energetic reactive armour (NERA) plates, with added hard armour ahead of the NERA (intended to protect the NERA elements and disrupt the penetrator before it encounters the NERA) and/or behind the NERA (intended to catch the fragments of long rods or HEAT jets after they have been fractured or disrupted by the front plate and NERA. This is another factor favouring a slab-sided or wedge-like turret: the amount of material the expanding plates push into the path of an attack increases as they are placed closer to parallel to the direction of that attack.

To date, few Chobham armour-protected tanks have been defeated by enemy fire in combat; the relevance of individual cases of lost tanks for determining the protective qualities of Chobham armour is difficult to ascertain as the extent to which such tanks are protected by ceramic modules is undisclosed.

During the second Iraq war in 2003, a Challenger 2 tank became stuck in a ditch while fighting in Basra against Iraqi forces. The crew remained safe inside for many hours, the Burlington LV2 composite armour protecting them from enemy fire, including multiple rocket-propelled grenades.

== Structure ==
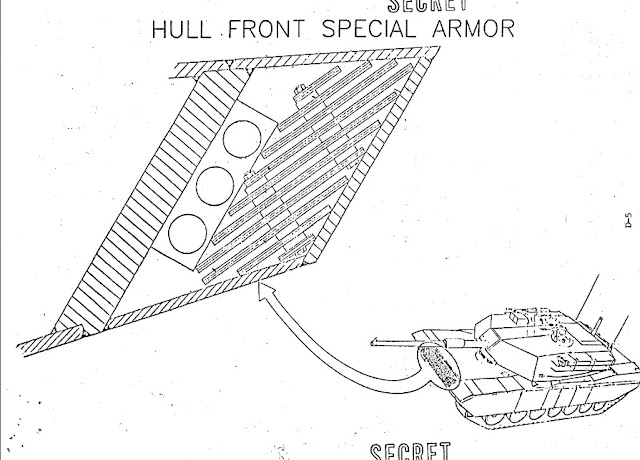
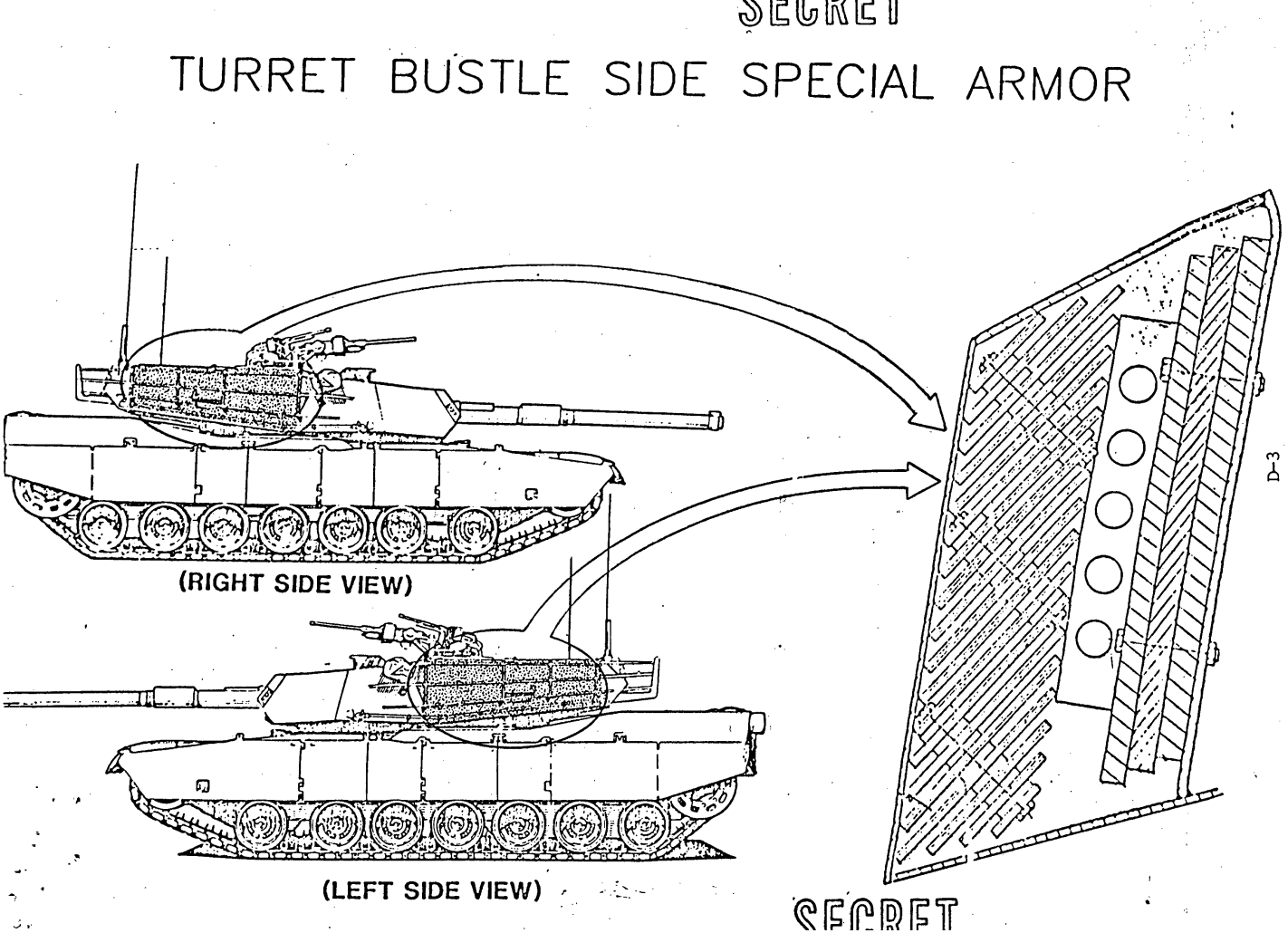
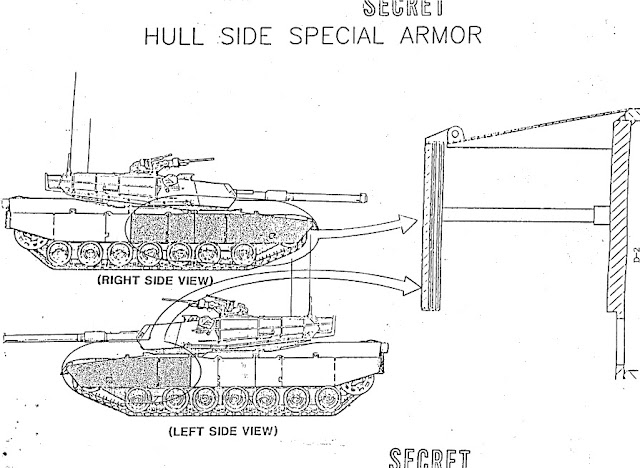
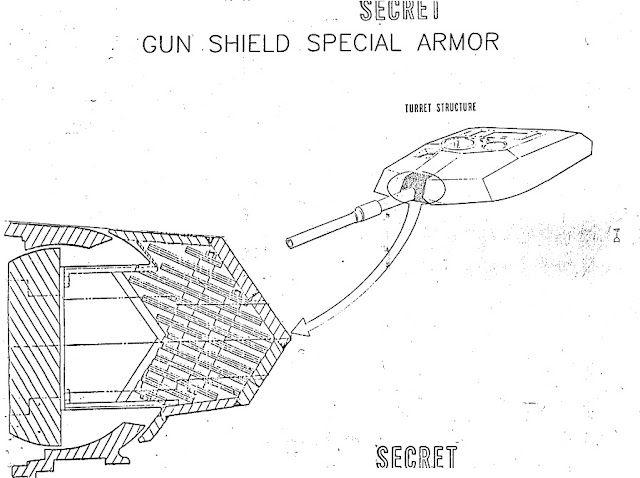
Configuration of early M1 Abrams Special Armor. Clockwise from upper left: Hull front, turret bustle with Chobham triplate, hull side with triplate, gun shield.

Ceramic tiles have a multiple hit capability problem in that they cannot sustain successive impacts without quickly losing much of their protective value. To minimise the effects of this the tiles are made as small as possible, but the matrix elements have a minimal practical thickness of about 25 mm (approximately one inch), and the ratio of coverage provided by tiles would become unfavourable, placing a practical limit at a diameter of about ten centimetres (approximately four inches). The small hexagonal or square ceramic tiles are encased within the matrix either by isostatically pressing them into the heated matrix, or by gluing them with an epoxy resin. Since the early 1990s it has been known that holding the tiles under constant compression by their matrix greatly improves their resistance to kinetic penetrators, which is difficult to achieve when using glues.

The matrix has to be backed by a plate, both to reinforce the ceramic tiles from behind and to prevent deformation of the metal matrix by a kinetic impact. Typically the backing plate has half of the mass of the composite matrix. The assemblage is again attached to elastic layers. These absorb impacts somewhat, but their main function is to prolong the service life of the composite matrix by protecting it against vibrations. Several assemblages can be stacked, depending on the available space; this way the armour can be made modular, to be replaceable, and more adaptable to varied tactical situations. The thickness of a typical assemblage is today about five to six centimetres. Earlier assemblages, so-called depth of penetration (DOP) matrices, were thicker. The relative interface defeat component of the protective value of a ceramic is much larger than for steel armour. Using a number of thinner matrices again enlarges that component for the entire armour package, an effect analogous to the use of alternate layers of high hardness and softer steel, which is typical for the glacis of modern Soviet tanks.

Ceramic tiles draw little or no advantage from sloped armour as they lack sufficient toughness to significantly deflect heavy penetrators. Indeed, because a single glancing shot could crack many tiles, the placement of the matrix is chosen so as to optimise the chance of a perpendicular hit, a reversal of the previous desired design feature for conventional armour. Ceramic armour normally even offers better protection for a given areal density when placed perpendicularly than when placed obliquely, because the cracking propagates along the surface normal of the plate. Instead of rounded forms, the turrets of tanks using Chobham armour typically have a slab-sided appearance.

The backing plate reflects the impact energy back to the ceramic tile in a wider cone. This dissipates the energy, limiting the cracking of the ceramic, but also means a more extended area is damaged. Spalling caused by the reflected energy can be reduced by a malleable thin graphite layer on the face of the ceramic absorbing the energy without making it strongly rebound again as a metal face plate would.

Tiles under compression suffer far less from impacts; in their case it can be advantageous to have a metal face plate bringing the tile also under perpendicular compression. The confined ceramic tile then reinforces the metal face plate, a reversal of the normal situation.

A gradual technological development has taken place in ceramic armour: ceramic tiles, in themselves vulnerable to low energy impacts, were first reinforced by gluing them to a backplate; in the nineties their resistance was increased by bringing them under compression on two axes; in the final phase a third compression axis was added to optimise impact resistance. To confine the ceramic core several advanced techniques are used, supplementing the traditional machining and welding, including sintering the suspension material around the core; squeeze casting of molten metal around the core and spraying the molten metal onto the ceramic tile.

=== Material ===
Over the years newer and tougher composites have been developed, giving about five times the protection value of the original pure ceramics, the best of which were again about five times as effective as a steel plate of equal weight. These are often a mixture of several ceramic materials, or metal matrix composites which combine ceramic compounds within a metal matrix. The latest developments involve the use of carbon nanotubes to improve toughness even further. Commercially produced or researched ceramics for such type of armour include boron carbide, silicon carbide, aluminium oxide (sapphire or "alumina"), aluminium nitride, titanium boride and Syndite, a synthetic diamond composite. Of these boron carbide is the hardest and lightest, but also the most costly and brittle. Boron carbide composites are today favoured for ceramic plates protecting against smaller projectiles, such as used in body armour and armoured helicopters; this was, in the early sixties, the first general application of ceramic armour. Silicon carbide is better suited to protect against larger projectiles than boron carbide as the latter material suffers a phase collapse when impacted by a projectile travelling at a speed over 850 m/s (2,800 ft/s). The ceramics can be created by pressureless sintering or hot pressing. A high density is required, so residual porosity must be minimised in the final part.

A matrix using a titanium alloy is very costly to produce but the metal is favoured for its lightness, strength, and resistance to corrosion, which is a constant problem.

The backing plate can be made from steel, but, as its main function is to improve the stability and stiffness of the assemblage, aluminium is more weight-efficient in light armoured fighting vehicles (AFVs) only to be protected against light anti-tank weapons. A deformable composite backing plate can combine the function of a metal backing plate and an elastic layer.

=== Heavy metal modules ===
The armour configuration of the first western tanks using Chobham armour was optimised to defeat shaped charges as guided missiles were seen as the greatest threat. In the eighties however they began to face the improved Soviet 3BM-32, then 3BM-42 kinetic energy penetrators which the ceramic layer was not particularly effective against: the original ceramics had a resistance against penetrators of about a third compared to that against HEAT rounds; for the newest composites it is about one-tenth. A typical example, the 3BM-42 is a segmented projectile which frontal segments are sacrificed in expanding the NERA plates in the front of the armour array, leaving a hole for the rear segment to strike the ceramic with full efficiency. For this reason many modern designs include added layers of heavy metals to add more density to the overall armour package.

The introduction of more effective ceramic composite materials allows for a larger width of these metal layers within the armour shell: given a certain protection level provided by the composite matrix, it can be thinner. Because these metal layers are denser than the rest of the composite array, increasing their thickness requires reducing the armour thickness in non-critical areas of the vehicle. They typically form an inner layer placed below the much more costly matrix, to prevent extensive damage to it should the metal layer strongly deform but not defeat a penetrator. They can also be used as the backing plate for the matrix itself, but this compromises the modularity and thus tactical adaptability of the armour system: ceramic and metal modules can then no longer be replaced independently. Furthermore, due to their extreme hardness, they deform insufficiently and would reflect too much of the impact energy, and in a too wide cone, to the ceramic tile, damaging it even further. Metals used include a tungsten alloy for the Challenger 2 or, in the case of the M1A1HA (Heavy Armor) and later American tank variants, a depleted uranium alloy. Some companies offer titanium carbide modules.

These metal modules function on the principle of perforated armour (typically employing perpendicular rods), with many expansion spaces reducing the weight by up to one third while keeping the protective qualities fairly constant. The depleted uranium alloy of the M1 has been described as "arranged in a type of armour matrix" and a single module as a "stainless-steel shell surrounding a layer (probably an inch or two thick) of depleted uranium, woven into a wire-mesh blanket".

Such modules are also used by tanks not equipped with Chobham armour. The combination of a composite matrix and heavy metal modules is sometimes informally referred to as "second generation Chobham".

== Development and application ==
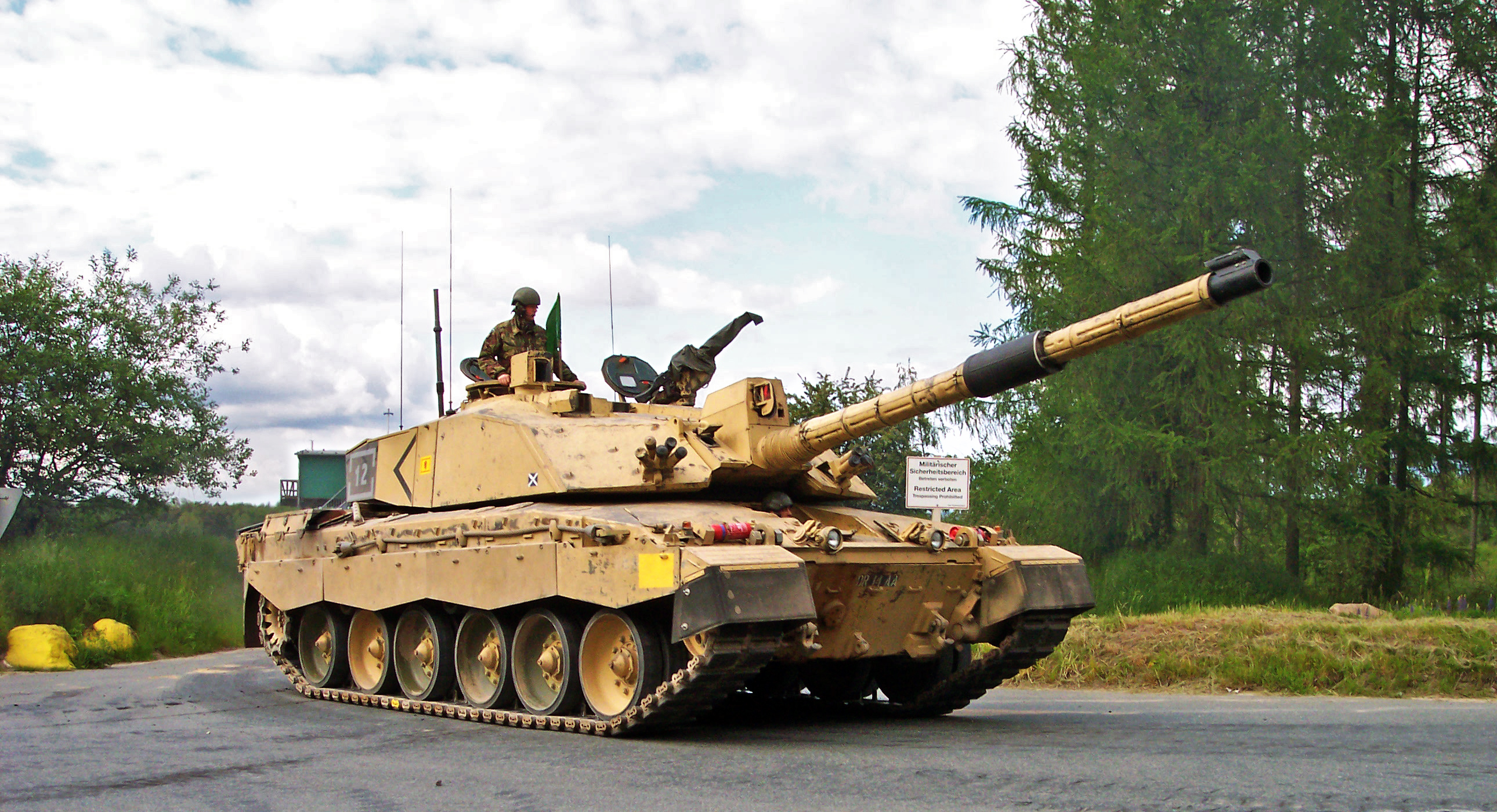
British Army Challenger 2

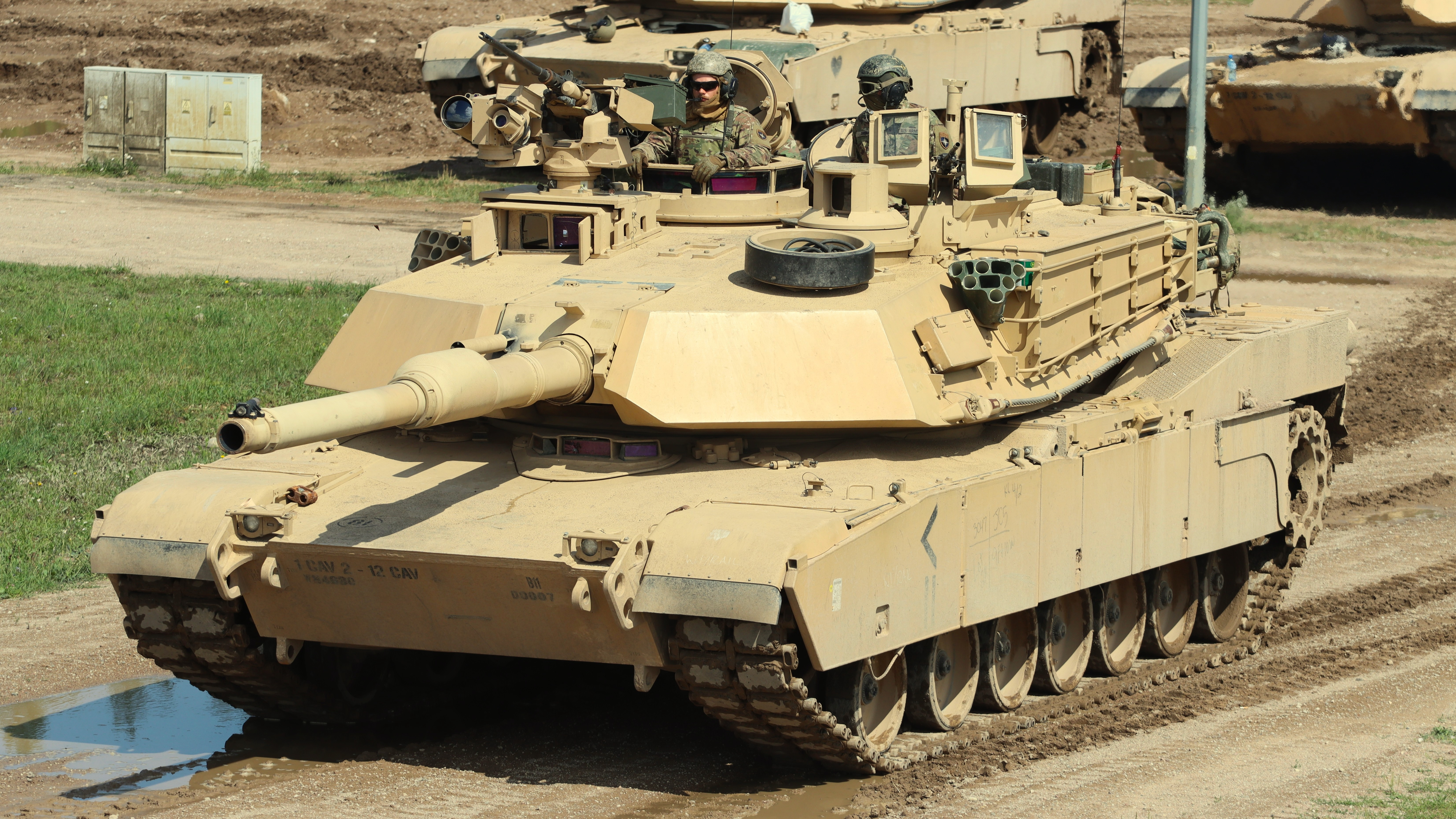
U.S. Army M1A2 Abrams in 2024

The concept of ceramic armour goes back to 1918, when Major Neville Monroe Hopkins discovered that a plate of ballistic steel was much more resistant to penetration if covered with a thin (1–2 millimetres) layer of enamel. Further, the Germans experimented with ceramic armour in World War I.

Since the early 1960s there were, in the US, extensive research programmes ongoing aimed at investigating the prospects of employing composite ceramic materials as vehicle armour. This research mainly focused on the use of an aluminium metal matrix composite reinforced by silicon carbide whiskers, to be produced in the form of large sheets. The reinforced light metal sheets were to be sandwiched between steel layers. This arrangement had the advantage of having a good multiple-hit capability and of being able to be curved, allowing the main armour to benefit from a sloped armour effect. However, this composite with a high metal content was primarily intended to increase the protection against KE-penetrators for a given armour weight; its performance against shaped charge attack was mediocre and would have to be improved by means of a laminate spaced armour effect, as researched by the Germans within the joint MBT-70 project.

An alternative technology developed in the US was based on the use of glass modules to be inserted into the main armour; although this arrangement offered a better shaped charge protection, its multiple hit capability was poor. A similar system using glass inserts in the main steel armour was from the late fifties researched for the Soviet Obiekt 430 prototype of the T-64; this was later developed into the "Combination K" type, having a ceramic compound mixed with the silicon oxide inserts, which offered about 50% better protection against both shaped charge and KE-penetrator threats, relative to steel armour of the same weight. It was, later in several improved forms, incorporated into the glacis of many subsequent Soviet main battle tank designs. After an initial period of speculation in the West as to its true nature, the characteristics of this type were disclosed when the dissolution of the Soviet Union in 1991 and the introduction of a market system forced the Russian industries to find new customers by highlighting its good qualities; it is today rarely referred to as Chobham armour. Special armour much more similar to Chobham appeared in 1983 under the name of BDD on the T-62M upgrade to the T-62, was first integrated to an armour array in 1986 on the T-72B, and has been a feature of every Soviet/Russian MBT since. In its original iteration, it is built directly into the cast steel turret of the T-72 and required lifting it to perform repairs.

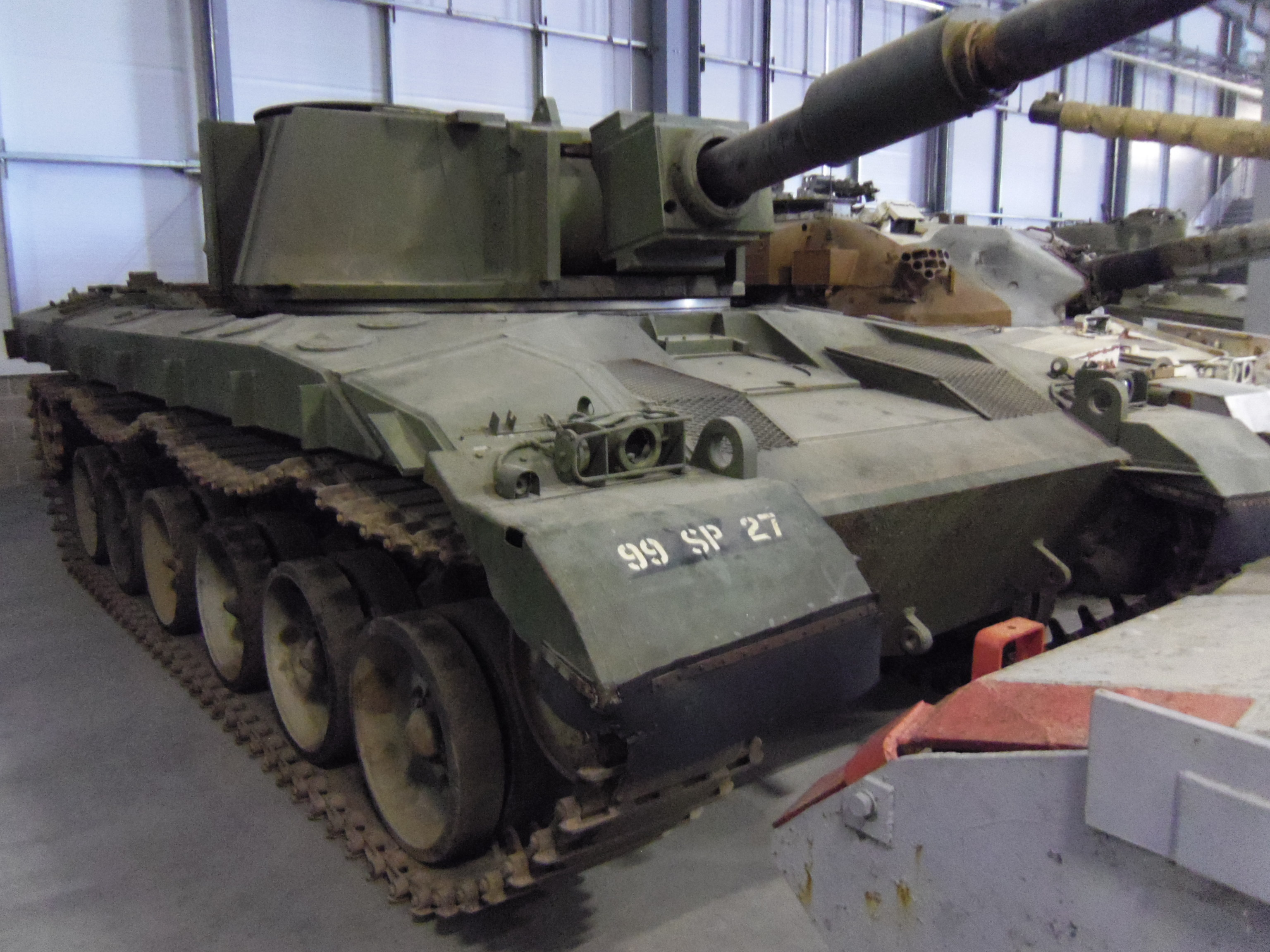
The British MBT-80 main battle tank was planned to field Chobham armour, before being cancelled in favour of the Challenger 1

In the United Kingdom another line of ceramic armour development had been started in the early 1960s, meant to improve the existing cast turret configuration of the Chieftain that already offered excellent heavy penetrator protection; the research by a team headed by Gilbert Harvey of the Fighting Vehicles Research and Development Establishment (FVRDE), therefore was strongly oriented at optimising the ceramic composite system for defeating shaped charge attack. The British system consisted of a honeycomb matrix with ceramic tiles backed by ballistic nylon, placed on top of the cast main armour. In July 1973 an American delegation, in search of a new armour type for the XM815 tank prototype, now that the MBT-70 project had failed, visited Chobham Common to be informed about the British system, the development of which had then cost about £6,000,000; earlier information had already been divulged to the US in 1965 and 1968. It was very impressed by the excellent shaped-charge protection combined with the penetrator impact damage limitation, inherent to the principle of using tiles. The Ballistic Research Laboratory at the Aberdeen Proving Ground, which later became a part of the Army Research Laboratory, initiated the development of a version that year named Burlington, adapted to the specific American situation, characterised by a much higher projected tank production run and the use of a thinner rolled steel main armour. The increased threat posed by a new generation of Soviet guided missiles armed with a shaped charge warhead, as demonstrated in the Yom Kippur War of October 1973, when even older-generation missiles caused considerable tank losses on the Israeli side, made Burlington the preferred choice for the armour configuration of the XM1 (the renamed XM815) prototype.

However, on 11 December 1974 a Memorandum of Understanding was signed between the Federal Republic of Germany and the US about the common future production of a main battle tank; this made any application of Chobham armour dependent on the eventual choice for a tank type. Earlier in 1974 the Americans had asked the Germans to redesign the existing Leopard 2 prototypes, considered by them too lightly armoured, and had suggested adoption of Burlington for this purpose, of which type the Germans had already been informed in March 1970; the Germans however in response in 1974 initiated a new armour development programme of their own. Having already designed a system that in their opinion offered satisfactory protection against shaped charges, consisting of multiple-laminate spaced armour, they put a clear emphasis on improving KE-penetrator protection, reworking the system into a perforated metal module armour. A version with added Burlington was considered, including ceramic inserts in the various spaces, but rejected as it would push vehicle weight well over sixty metric tonnes, a weight then seen as prohibitive by both armies. The US Army in the summer of 1974 faced the choice between the German system and their own Burlington, a decision made more difficult because Burlington offered, relative to steel armour, no weight advantage against KE-penetrators: the total armour system would have a RHA equivalence against them of about 350 mm (compared to about 700 mm against shaped charges). No consensus developing, General Creighton Abrams himself decided the issue in favour of Burlington. Eventually each army procured its own national tank design, the project of a common tank failing in 1976. In February 1978 the first tanks protected by Burlington left the factory when the first of eleven pilot M1 tanks were delivered by Chrysler Corporation to the US Army.

Beside these state projects, private enterprise in the US during the 1970s also developed ceramic armour types, like the Noroc armour made by the Protective Products Division of the Norton Company, consisting of boron carbide sheets backed by resin-bonded glass cloth.

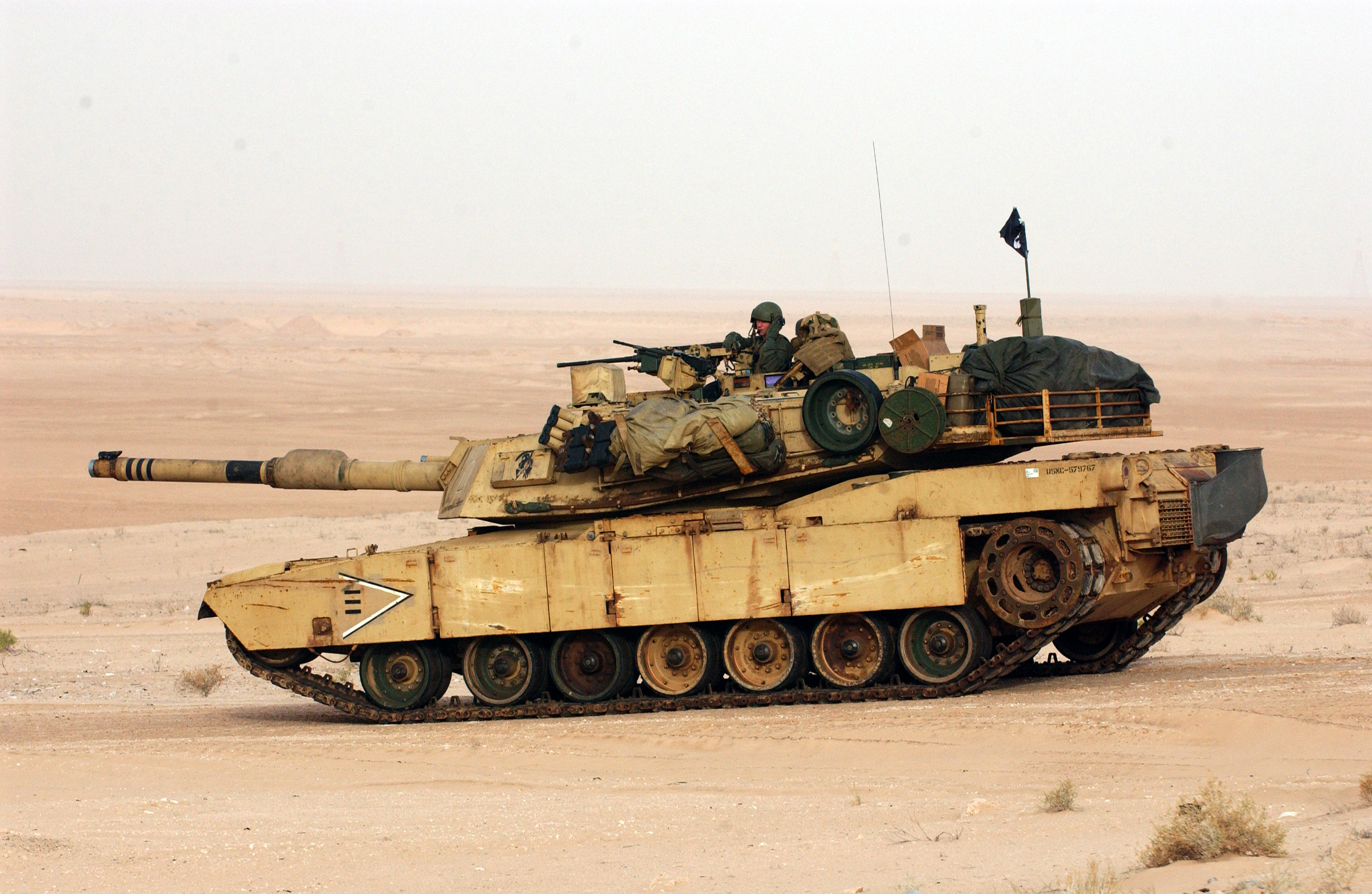
US Marine Corps M1A1 on a live fire exercise in Iraq, 2003. It is a modern Main Battle Tank that extensively uses Chobham armour

In the United Kingdom application of Chobham armour was delayed by the failure of several advanced tank projects: first that of a joint German-British main battle tank; then the purely British MBT-80 programme. A first directive to prepare Chobham armour technology for application in 1975 was already given in 1969. It was determined by a study of a possible Chobham-armour protected MICV that a completely new design using only Chobham armour for the most vulnerable front and side sectors (thus without an underlying steel main armour) could be 10% lighter for the same level of protection against KE-ammunition, but to limit costs it was decided to base the first design on the conventional Chieftain. The prototype, FV 4211 or the "Aluminium Chieftain", was fitted with a welded aluminium add-on armour, in essence a box on the front hull and front and side turret to contain the ceramic modules, of which box the fifty millimetre thick inner wall due to its relative softness could serve as their backing plate. The extra weight of the aluminium was limited to less than two tonnes and it was shown that it was not overly susceptible to cracking, as first feared. Ten test vehicles were ordered but only the original one had been built when the project was cancelled in favour of the more advanced programmes. However, the Iranian government ordered 1,225 vehicles of an upgraded Chieftain type, the Shir-2 (FV 4030/3), using the same technology of adding Chobham armour to the main cast armour, bringing total weight to 62 metric tonnes. When this order was cancelled in February 1979 because of the Iranian Revolution, the British government, under pressure to modernise its tank fleet to maintain a qualitative superiority relative to the Soviet tank forces, decided to use the sudden surplus production capacity to procure a number of vehicles very close in design to the Shir-2, called the Challenger 1. On 12 April 1983 the first British tank protected by Chobham armour was delivered to the Royal Hussars.

In France from 1966 GIAT Industries performed experiments aimed at developing a light vehicle ceramic armour, in 1970 resulting in the CERALU-system consisting of aluminium-backed alumina weldable to the vehicle, offering a 50% increase in weight-efficiency against ballistic threats compared to steel plate. An improved version was later applied in helicopter seats.

The latest version of Chobham armour is used on the Challenger 2 (called Dorchester armour), and (though the composition most probably differs) the M1 Abrams series of tanks, which according to official sources is currently protected by silicon carbide tiles. Given the publicly stated protection level for the earliest M1: 350 mm steel equivalence against armour-piercing fin-stabilized discarding sabot (APFSDS) kinetic energy (KE) penetrators, it seems to have been equipped with alumina tiles.

Though it is often claimed to be otherwise, the original production model of the Leopard 2 did not use Chobham armour, but a combined spaced armour and perforated armour configuration, cheaper in terms of procurement, maintenance and replacement than a ceramic armour system. For many modern tanks, such the Italian Ariete, it is yet unknown which type is used. There was a general trend in the 1980s away from ceramic armour towards spaced armour, but even many tanks from the 1970s like the Leopard 1A3 and A4, the French AMX 32 and AMX 40 prototypes used the latter system; the Leclerc has an improved version.

== Future ==
The Challenger 3, the successor to the Challenger 2 in the British Army, will feature Epsom armour.

== See also ==
- Case-hardening
