= Vickers MBT Mark 4 =

Vickers MBT Mk. 4
- Type: Main battle tank
- Place of origin: United Kingdom

Production history
- Unit cost: $1.39 million (1993)

Specifications
- Mass: 43.6 t (Mk. 4); 47 t (Valiant)
- Length: 7.51 m (24 ft 8 in) hull 10.62 m (34 ft 10 in) with gun forward
- Width: 3.3 m (10 ft 10 in); 3.6 m (11 ft 10 in) with appliqué armour
- Height: 2.48 m (8 ft 1.64 in)
- Crew: 4 (commander, gunner, loader and driver)
- Armour: Chobham
- Main armament: 105 mm L7A1 rifled gun (Mk. 4); 120 mm L11 rifled gun (Valiant); 120 mm Rh-120 smoothbore gun (proposed)
- Secondary armament: RSAF L8A2 7.62 mm coaxial machine gun (Mk. 4); McDonnell-Douglas Helicopter Co 7.62 mm EX-34 chain gun (Valiant)
- Engine: GM Detroit Diesel 12V-71T and later Rolls-Royce CV12 TCA Condor; 915 hp (682 kW) at 2,500 rpm 1,000 hp (750 kW) at 2,300 rpm
- Power/weight: 20.9 hp/t–21.2 hp/t
- Transmission: TN 12-1000
- Suspension: torsion bar
- Ground clearance: 50 cm (1 ft 8 in)
- Fuel capacity: 1,130 litres (249 imperial gallons; 299 US gallons)
- Operational range: 550 km (340 mi)
- Maximum speed: 61.2 km/h (38.0 mph).

The Vickers Main Battle Tank Mk. 4 later known as the Vickers Valiant was a main battle tank developed as a private venture by British company Vickers for export. Its development began in 1976 and ended in January 1984. Although the Valiant did not enter production, its development provided valuable experience in the production of an aluminium-hulled, Chobham-armoured tank in the 40 tonnes weight range. A further development of its turret was later used for the Vickers Mk. 7 MBT.

== History ==
In August 1977, Vickers produced a design for a vehicle that incorporated Chobham composite armour protection within a battle weight of 43 tonnes.

This first prototype, designated the Vickers Main Battle Tank Mark 4, mounted the L7 105 mm rifled gun and, in 1978, underwent automotive tests with the Rolls-Royce CV12 TCA developing 1000 bhp and with the General Motors Detroit Diesel 12V-71T developing 915 bhp.

The prototype of the Mk. 4 was firstly exhibited at the British Army Equipment Exhibition in June 1980, along with a mock-up of a new universal turret fitted with a 120 mm L11 gun.

By the time of the British Army Equipment Exhibition in June 1982, the tank had undergone extensive testing with the new turret. The design of the Universal Turret was a radical change from the original and included the installation of many state-of-the-art components. This quantum leap in turret evolution led to a decision to give the Mk. 4 a new identity, and it was renamed the " Valiant ". In early January 1983, the Valiant slipped off the low-loader of its tank transporter during transport at Larkhill and rolled onto its roof. The optics and the elevation gearbox were damaged and repaired within a week. It was then shipped to Lulworth ranges for trials on behalf of the ATDU (Armoured Trials and Development Unit).
From February to March 1983, the Valiant took part in the Floater '83 floating arms exhibition, touring the Middle East countries on the ferry Viking Venturer.
The Valiant went back to the Middle East in July and August of the same year, where it was involved in desert trials in the United Arab Emirates along with the British FV4030/4 Challenger 1 and the French AMX-40.

Its development was completed in January 1984. Although the tests of the Valiant in the Middle East indicated that the Valiant tank had excellent firepower and fire control components, the mobility characteristics were deficient, leading to the termination of its marketing effort in July 1985. Nevertheless, future automotive improvements were to improve the Valiant deficient mobility under the designation of Valiant 2.
The Universal Turret was fitted in 1985 to a German Leopard 2 hull to become the Vickers Mk. 7 main battle tank.

In 1989, the Valiant took part in the exercise Hellspot on Salisbury Plain with the purpose of trialling thermal sights. The fate of the hull, the first turret, and the Universal Turret remains unknown to this date.

== Design ==
The fire control and gun stabilization system was an all-electric system developed by Marconi. This featured a built-in laser rangefinder and a brand-new solid-state ballistic computer to improve the chances of a first-round hit capability against static and moving targets as well as for supporting firing on the move. This system used the Marconi Radar SFCS 600 computer derived from the GCE 620 system installed on the Vickers Mk. 3 main battle tank with some improvements, known as the Marconi Radar systems Centaur 1 system.

The gunner was provided with a Vickers Instruments L30 telescopic laser sight as a main sight. The sight was monocular, with a magnification of ×10, and was fitted with a Barr and Stroud LF 11 Neodimium-YAG laser rangefinder and a cathode-ray tube for injection of fire-control data. In addition to his main sight, the gunner was also provided with a Vickers Instruments GS10 periscopic sight. This was mounted in the turret roof and provided a ×1 wide angle field of view and was used for surveillance and target acquisition.

The commander had a ring of six fixed ×1 periscopes around his hatch to give all-around vision. The commander's main sight was a French SFIM VS580-10 gyrostabilized panoramic sight. Two degrees of magnification ×3 and ×10 were provided; it also incorporated a Nd-YAG laser rangefinder. In addition, a gyrostabilised panoramic thermal sight, the Dutch Philips-USFA UA 9090, was also mounted on the turret roof, in front of the loader's hatch.

The loader has at his disposal one AFV No.10 Mk.1 rotating periscope.

The driver was originally provided with only a single wide-angle AFV No.44 Mark 2 periscope which was later supplemented in late 1982 by two additional side-looking periscopes.

=== Protection ===
The basic hull structure of the Valiant was fabricated from 7039 aluminium alloy armour, allowing optimum use of Chobham armour within an overall weight of 47 tonnes. The turret structure was made of welded steel plates, with a layer of Chobham armour added to the front and sides.

The use of Chobham armour allowed increased ballistic protection compared to the heavier Chieftain. Emphasis was placed upon frontal protection covering a 60° arc against 5 inches (127 mm) shaped charge warheads, MILAN and Swingfire ATGMs and over a 50° frontal arc against 105 mm APDS. (Note: According to the video Vickers Mk IV - Design & Development based on Bovington Archives and Kew Archives.) In addition, however, Chobham armour was also applied along the full length of the hull sides (heavy ballistic skirts). The turret and hull sides were protected against Carl Gustav 84 mm HEAT rounds and RPG-7 warheads.

The tank was also equipped with a Westair Dynamics Ltd type 6 NBC protection system and a Graviner Firewire F.D.S automatic fire extinguishing system.

=== Armament ===
The first prototype was armed with a Royal Ordnance L7 105 mm rifled gun, 56 to 60 rounds are carried, 30 of which are stowed in the hull, to the left of the driver.

In 1982 it was rearmed with the Royal Ordnance L11 120 mm rifled gun, 42 to 52 rounds are carried, 21 rounds are stowed in the hull, to the left of the driver. The L11A5 was fitted with an experimental rigid thermal sleeve optimized for hot weather operations, it was made of a new material called Fibrelam, it was also featured on the Vickers Mk. 7 MBT.. Alternatively, the Valiant can be armed with the Rheinmetall Rh-120 120 mm smoothbore gun; 44 rounds are carried, 28 rounds are stowed in the hull, to the left of the driver.

The secondary armament of the Mk. 4 includes a 7.62 mm FN MAG coaxial machine gun, which was later replaced on the Valiant's Universal Turret by a 7.62 mm Hughes EX-34 Chain Gun. This externally-powered weapon has been adopted because of the advantages it offers to the crew, including its ability to eject faulty rounds without a stoppage of the gun and the elimination of gun fumes in the turret.

=== Mobility ===
The Mk. 4 was first fitted with a General Motors Detroit Diesel 12V-71T engine developing 915 bhp and subsequently fitted a Rolls-Royce V-12 diesel engine, the CV12 TCA Condor, virtually the same engine as that fitted in the British Army FV4030/4 Challenger 1 main battle tank, but is rated at 1000 bhp instead of 1200 bhp. The lower power rating increases its durability and, because it is less highly turbocharged, its response is more rapid, which increases the tank acceleration. The engine has a minimum specific fuel consumption of 207 g/(kW⋅h).

The transmission of the Valiant does not follow the trend to use torque converters and hydrostatic steering. Instead, it is a modified version of the six-speed David Brown TN-12 Mk. 3 transmission produced for the FV4201 Chieftain, but made fully automatic by means of an electronic control system. Designed by Self-Changing Gears Limited of Coventry, the TN-12-1000 was able to handle greater torque than the TN-12 Mk. 3, specifically 3,660 Nm compared to 2,509 Nm of torque on the TN-12 Mk. 3. The TN-12-1000 was also used on the Chieftain 900. The all-mechanical transmission has the inherent advantage of being more efficient, which means that more of the engine power is available to drive the tank, instead of being dissipated by oil coolers. At the same time, the skill and effort generally required of drivers by mechanical transmissions are eliminated by the electrical controls.

The suspension of the Mk. 4 is almost the only feature carried over with little change from the Vickers Mark 1 and Mark 3 MBTs. The total vertical wheel travel is 303 mm (bump : 202 mm / rebound : 101 mm). In principle, it is of a conventional, torsion bar type, but it is unique in having secondary torsion bar springs in the trailing arms of the first two and the last road wheels on each side. The secondary torsion bars provide more effective springing at the most critical wheel stations and significantly improve the ride over rough ground. In addition to this, wheel stations 1, 2, and 6 also had hydraulic shock absorbers. Having a heavier turret than the Mk. 4, the Valiant had secondary torsion bars fitted to all wheel stations.

== Additional specifications ==
- Ground pressure: 0.916 kg/cm²
- Power/weight ratio: 23,3 bhp/t
- Maximum gradient 58%
- Maximum tilt: 30%
- Trench: 3 m
- Vertical obstacle: 0.914 m
- Fording depth: 1,1 m
- Gun control: Marconi Command and Control Systems Centaur I fully integrated gun-and-fire control system
- Fire control system: Marconi Radar SFCS 600

== Variant ==
- Mk. 4: early prototype armed with an L7 105 mm rifled gun, a 7.62 mm L8A2 coaxial machine gun, and a cupola-mounted L37A2 machine gun.
- Valiant: upgraded Mk. 4 fitted with the Vickers Universal Turret armed with a L11A5 120 mm rifled gun and a EX-34 Chain Gun 7.62 mm coaxial machine gun. All wheel trailing arms are now fitted with secondary torsion bars.
- Valiant 2: proposed upgrade with automotive improvements comprising a hydrogas suspension system and the German MTU MT 872 1200 hp diesel engine.

== See also ==
- Vickers MBT Mk. 3 (predecessor)
- Vickers MBT Mk. 7 (successor)
- AMX-32 (French counterpart)
- AMX-40 (French counterpart)
- FV4201 Chieftain
- FV4034 Challenger 2
