= Vickers MBT Mark 7 =

Prototype of main battle tank

Vickers MBT Mk. 7
- Type: Main battle tank
- Place of origin: United Kingdom/West Germany

Production history
- No. built: 1 prototype

Specifications
- Mass: 54.6 t
- Length: 7.722 m (25 ft 4.0 in) hull 10.95 m (35 ft 11 in) with gun forward
- Width: 3.42 m (11 ft 3 in)
- Height: 2.54 m (8 ft 4.00 in)
- Crew: 4 (commander, gunner, loader and driver)
- Armour: Chobham
- Main armament: 120 mm L11 rifled gun
- Secondary armament: McDonnell-Douglas Helicopter Co 7.62 mm EX-34 chain gun
- Engine: MTU MB 873 Ka-501; 1,500 hp (1,100 kW) at 2,600 rpm
- Power/weight: 27 hp/t
- Transmission: Renk HSWL 354
- Suspension: torsion bar
- Ground clearance: 50 cm
- Fuel capacity: 1,160 litres (255 imperial gallons; 306 US gallons)
- Operational range: 550 km (340 mi)
- Maximum speed: 72 km/h (45 mph)

The Vickers Main Battle Tank Mark 7 was a main battle tank developed on the basis of a joint venture between Vickers Defence Systems in the United Kingdom and Krauss-Maffei of Germany. It combined the Leopard 2 chassis with the Universal Turret previously developed for the Vickers Valiant main battle tank. The Vickers Mk. 7 was a key milestone in the development of the Challenger 2 as many of the features developed and successfully demonstrated in the turret of the Vickers Mk. 7 were later incorporated into the Challenger 2.

== History ==
Following trials of the Vickers Valiant in the Middle East in 1983, some interest was expressed by some potential customers for a main battle tank that combined the firepower and turret system of the Valiant tank with a more powerful engine. The most powerful tank engine available at that time was the German MTU MB 873 Ka-501 of the Leopard 2 and the Mk. 7 was designed to use this engine by using the chassis of the Leopard 2.
In 1984 work commenced at Vickers Defence Systems on a new main battle tank which became the Mk. 7. The prototype essentially consisted of the chassis of the Leopard 2 main battle tank fitted with a further development of the Universal Turret of the Valiant. The first prototype was completed in June 1985, the crew and vehicle work-up at Lulworth and Bovington lasted until July 1985.
Between August and October 1985, the Mk. 7 underwent extensive trials in Egypt in which it went to Cairo to Suez and back in a single day, covering a distance of 274 km, with the ambient temperature over 30 °C.
For a variety of reasons, no sales of the Vickers Mk. 7 were made and following the takeover of the Royal Ordnance Factory in Leeds in 1986 by Vickers Defence Systems, the main emphasis was on further development of the Challenger 1 main battle tank. Some features of the Vickers Mk. 7 such as the gun mantlet and the commander's independent stabilized panoramic sight were subsequently reused in a revised turret on the Challenger 2.

== Design ==
=== Fire control and vision ===
The gunner is provided with a Nanoquest L30 telescopic laser sight as his main sight. This sight is mounted through the rotor co-axially with the main gun, thus eliminating the errors normally associated with mechanical linkages. The monocular sight has a magnification of ×10 and is fitted with a Nd-YAG laser rangefinder and a cathode-ray tube for injection of fire-control data and the thermal image when selected. In addition to his main sight, the gunner is also provided with a Vickers Instruments GS10 periscope sight mounted in the turret roof and providing a wide-angle field of view and is used for surveillance and target acquisition.

The tank commander is provided with a ring of six fixed ×1 periscopes around his hatch to give all-around vision. The commander’s main sight is a French SFIM VS 580-10 panoramic day sight that allows him to scan through a full 360 degrees without moving his head. Two degrees of magnification; ×3 and ×10, are provided and the gyrostabilised head enables the commander to hold the sight accurately on the target from the moving vehicle. An Nd-YAG laser rangefinder incorporated in the sight enables the commander to engage targets and to fire on the move. Indicators in the commander’s sight right eyepiece show the position of the sight axis, and the gun axis. Fire-control information from the computer and laser is displayed on the left eyepiece. When used in the surveillance mode the commander has the facility to align his main sight with any one of his six periscopes. This is achieved by pushing a button mounted under each periscope. A gyrostabilised Dutch Philips UA 9090 panoramic thermal sight is mounted on the turret roof. This provides a thermal picture on 625-lines monitors for both the commander and gunner. An aiming mark injected into the sight picture enables the sight to be used for engaging targets in the normal way.

The loader has a single-piece hatch cover that opens to the rear, in front of which is an AFV No 30 Mark 1 observation periscope.

=== Armament ===
The main armament consisted of a Royal Ordnance L11A5 120 mm rifled gun, it was fitted with an experimental rigid thermal sleeve optimized for hot weather operations, it was made of a new material called Fibrelam, it was also featured on the Vickers Valiant MBT.

The turret left rear housed an ammunition compartment sealed off from the crew by an armoured bulkhead with a sliding door. 120 mm rounds such as the L23A1 APFSDS could be vertically stacked in rows. (Note: As seen in the video Tank Chats #92 Challenger 2: Full Length published on Youtube by the Tank Museum.)

Other main armament options included the Rheinmetall Rh-120 L44 and GIAT G1 120 mm smoothbore guns. A total of 44 120×570mm rounds could have been carried, 15 of which were to stored in a separated compartment in the turret bustle behind the loader station.

A 7.62-mm McDonnell Douglas Helicopter Chain Gun mounted co-axially to the left of the main gun is belt-fed from an ammunition bin that is replenished by the loader. A 12.7-mm anti-aircraft machine-gun is available as optional equipment.

=== Protection ===
The protection is provided by British Chobham armour. The crew area of the turret and the hull front are protected over a frontal arc of plus or minus 30 degrees about the center line from APDS and APFSDS up to 120 mm caliber, anti-tank guided missiles such as the MILAN and the Swingfire and man-portable anti-tank weapons such as the Carl Gustaf and the RPG-7.

The turret right rear housed an NBC air filtration system made by Westair Dynamics. A set of 66 mm grenade dischargers were mounted on either sides of the turret and were later relocated on the turret cheeks. The Mark 7 has three features that reduces the likelihood of its detection by night sights and other heat-sensing devices. These are its coat of infra-red reflective paint; the mixing of the hot exhaust gases with the cooling air before discharge; and a new design of thermal sleeve.

=== Mobility ===
The hull of the Leopard 2 incorporates a MTU MB 873 Ka-501 V12 diesel engine rated at 1,500 PS (1.1 MW) at 2600 RPM. The engine is cooled by two annular radiators mounted horizontally above the transmission. The Renk HSWL 354 gearbox features four forward and two reverse gears and its hydrostatic steering mechanism provides regenerative steering at all steering radii. The suspension is of the torsion-bar type with seven dual rubber-tyred road wheels on each side. The first, second, third, sixth and seventh wheel stations incorporate rotary shocks absorbers.

=== Versions ===
- Vickers Mk. 7/1 : was completed in 1985 and successfully tested in Egypt shortly afterward. It was later displayed at the June 1986 British Army Equipment Exhibition (BAEE) in Aldershot.
- Vickers Mk. 7/2 : new turret with improved armour protection and fire control system for better fire-on the-move capability. The new turret is designed to better suit the 1.98 m turret ring of the Leopard 2 hull instead of the 2.15 m of the Vickers Valiant.

== See also ==
- Vickers Valiant (predecessor)
- FV4034 Challenger 2
- AMX-40 (French counterpart)
