= Military Vehicles and Engineering Establishment =

British defence research unit in Surrey

Coordinates: 51°22′54″N 0°35′33″W

The Military Vehicles and Engineering Establishment (MVEE) was a British defence research unit on Chobham Lane, Chertsey in Surrey. It was responsible for many innovations in armoured vehicle design, including ceramic Chobham armour.

== History ==
The Admiralty's Landships Committee was created in 1915 to oversee the development of what would become known as tanks. In the same year, the Design Department was set up at the Royal Arsenal, Woolwich. The Tank and Tracked Transport Experiment Establishment (TTTEE) was formed at Farnborough in 1925, which in turn spawned the Mechanical Warfare Experimental Establishment (MWEE) in 1928. The MWEE was renamed the Mechanisation Experimental Establishment (MEE) in 1934 and in 1940 the MEE merged with elements of the Design Department at Woolwich to form the Department of Tank Design.

In 1942, the DTD at Farnborough spawned the Fighting Vehicles Proving Establishment (FVPE), which moved to a new purpose-built camp in Chertsey on the site of the former RAF Chobham that was convenient for testing tanks on Chobham Heath. The Wheeled Vehicles Experimental Establishment (WVEE) was also formed out of the DTD in that year, and moved to Chertsey in 1943.

In 1946, the DTD merged with WVEE to form the Fighting Vehicle Design Department (FVDD) at Chertsey alongside the FVPE. The FVDD was renamed the Fighting Vehicle Design Establishment (FVDE) in 1948. Four years later, the FVPE and FVDE merged to create the Fighting Vehicles Research and Development Establishment (FVRDE).

In 1970, FVRDE and the Military Experimental Engineering Establishment (MEXE) at Christchurch amalgamated to form the Military Vehicles and Engineering Establishment (MVEE). Between 1984 and 1985, Chertsey became the Vehicles Department of the Royal Armament Research and Development Establishment (RARDE) as the MVEE and the Propellants, Explosives and Rocket Motor Establishment (PERME) based at Waltham Abbey and Westcott, merged with RARDE Fort Halstead.

In the wake of the ending of the Cold War, RARDE merged with other research establishments in April 1991 to form the Defence Research Agency (DRA), an executive agency of the Ministry of Defence. In turn, DRA became a division of the Defence Evaluation and Research Agency (DERA) in 1995. The Chertsey and Christchurch sites were among those allocated to Qinetiq when DERA was broken up in 2001 with the intention that Qinetiq would be privatised, which happened in 2006. Certain technologies, such as electric armour, were retained within the Defence Science and Technology Laboratory (Dstl).

In 1972, the research staff at Chertsey were joined by the Vehicles Branch of the Royal Electrical and Mechanical Engineers (REME), which became the Vehicles and Weapons Branch in 1982, the Army Technical Support Agency (ATSA) in 1995, and finally the Defence Logistics Organisation (DLO) Chertsey from 2000 until 2005. The DLO and its predecessors were responsible for the support and testing of all British Army vehicles.

During the 1990s, vehicle testing was carried out by a sub-contracted company who provided drivers to test a range of military vehicles ascertaining a range of requirements from their ability to move over rough terrain through to their tipping point.

In November 2003, Qinetiq sold the 315 acre Chertsey site to Crest Nicholson and Morley Fund Management (part of CGNU) for redevelopment. They submitted a plan for up to 113,434 square metres of development in 2005, which was later reduced. It now forms the backlot of Longcross Studios and has plans for redevelopment as residential.
