= Longcross railway station =

Railway station in Surrey, England

Coordinates: 51°23′06″N 0°35′42″W

Longcross
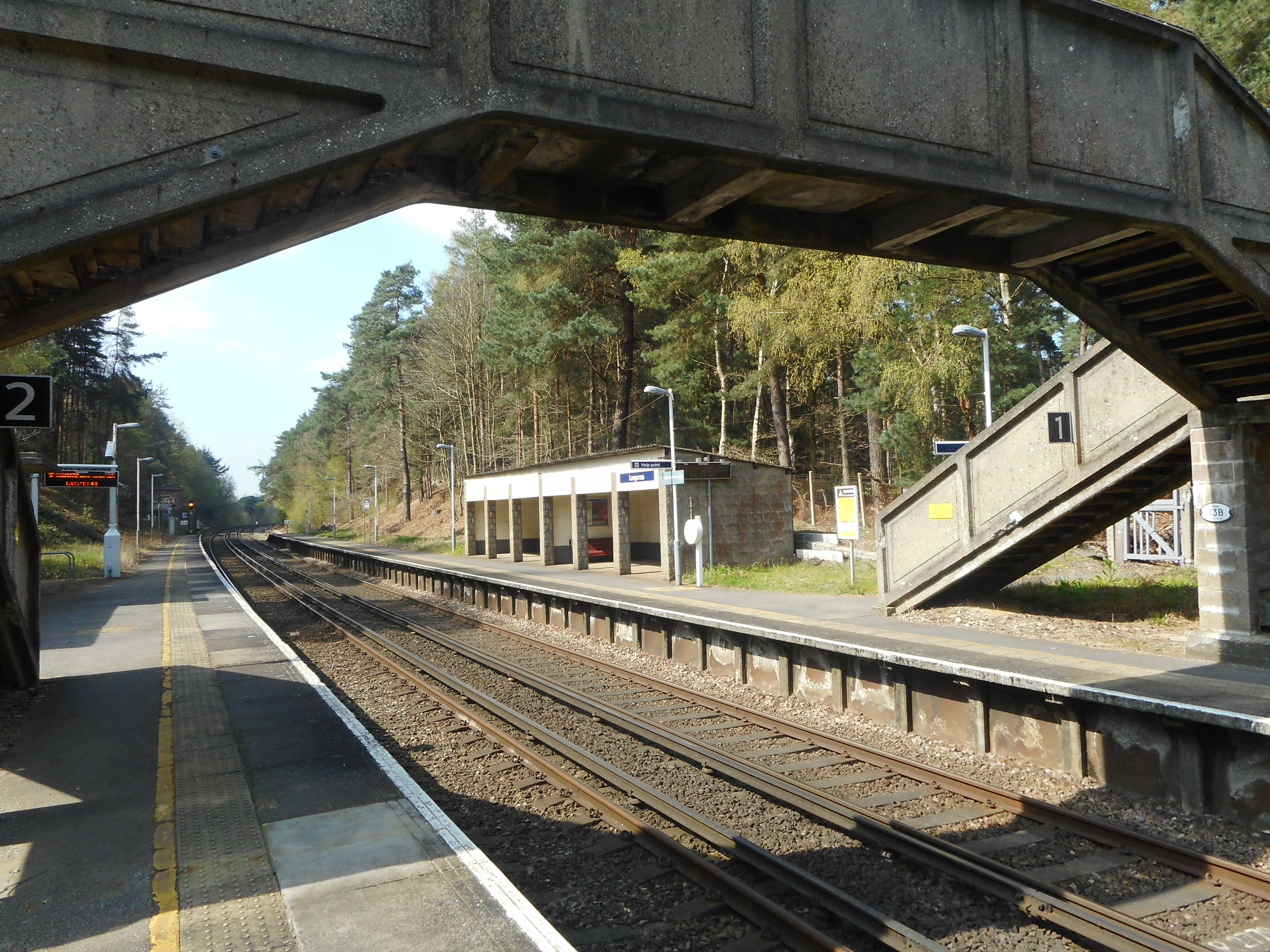

General information
- Location: Longcross, Runnymede; England
- Grid reference: SU978660
- Managed by: South Western Railway
- Platforms: 2

Other information
- Station code: LNG
- Classification: DfT category F2

History
- Original company: Southern Railway
- Post-grouping: Southern Railway

Key dates
- c. 1940: Opened to restricted traffic, as Longcross Halt
- 21 September 1942: Opened to general traffic
- 5 May 1969: Renamed Longcross

Passengers
- 2020/21: ▼21,356
- 2021/22: ▲68,956
- 2022/23: ▲96,298
- 2023/24: ▼71,368
- 2024/25: ▲84,920
Location
Notes
- Passenger statistics from the Office of Rail and Road

Longcross railway station is next to Longcross Garden Village (Upper Longcross) in Surrey, England. It straddles the former parishes of Virginia Water and Lyne and Longcross (a current civil parish) in part of the large wooded sandy heath known as Surrey Heath, larger than the district of the same name. It is 25 miles 11 chains (40.5 km) down the line from London Waterloo and is served as a minor stop by South Western Railway on the Waterloo–Reading line.

== History ==
The station was opened c. 1940 by the Southern Railway. Originally named Longcross Halt, it was not shown in regular timetables until 21 September 1942. On 5 May 1969 it was renamed Longcross by British Rail.

Since the May 2022 timetable change, trains stopping at this station have increased to a regular half-hourly frequency similar to other stations on the Waterloo–Reading line. This reflects the development of Longcross Garden Village nearby.

== Location ==
The station provides access to Longcross Garden Village, and the adjacent Longcross film studios. The station has no direct road access but has a short, broad path to the nearby residential Burma Road and Churchill Drive.

To the north is Wentworth Golf Course, lacking any rights of way between it and the station. The station is adjacent to parts of the Wentworth Estate and, beyond the M3 motorway, Chobham Common.

== Services ==
All services at Longcross are operated by South Western Railway.

The typical off-peak service in trains per hour is:

- 2 tph to London Waterloo via Richmond
- 2 tph to Reading

On Sundays, the service is reduced to hourly in each direction.

Preceding station	National Rail	Following station
Virginia Water	South Western Railway Waterloo to Reading Line	Sunningdale
