= Syndite =

Syndite is a composite material which combines the hardness, abrasion resistance and thermal conductivity of diamond with the toughness of tungsten carbide.

== Applications ==
- cutting tools for machining
- a wide variety of abrasive materials
- wear part applications

== Advantages ==
- improved life of the tool, or wear part
- improved process reliability
- improved frictional behaviour

== Grades ==
Syndite is produced in five standard grades:

- CTB002
- CTC 002
- CTB010
- CTB025
- CTH 025

The numbers refer to the average dimensions in micrometres of the starting diamond material. The designation CTB indicates standard Polycrystalline diamond (PCD) products, whereas CTC and CTH indicate modified PCD grades. Syndite CTB010 may, in most cases, be regarded as the general-purpose grade.
