= Interface defeat =

Occurs when ceramic armor defeats a kinetic projectile

Interface defeat is when a ceramic armour system, typically on an armoured fighting vehicle, defeats a kinetic energy penetrator at the ceramic's front surface. Above a certain impact velocity, known as the transition velocity, interface defeat can no longer occur and either penetration or perforation of the ceramic occurs.
