= M250 grenade launcher =

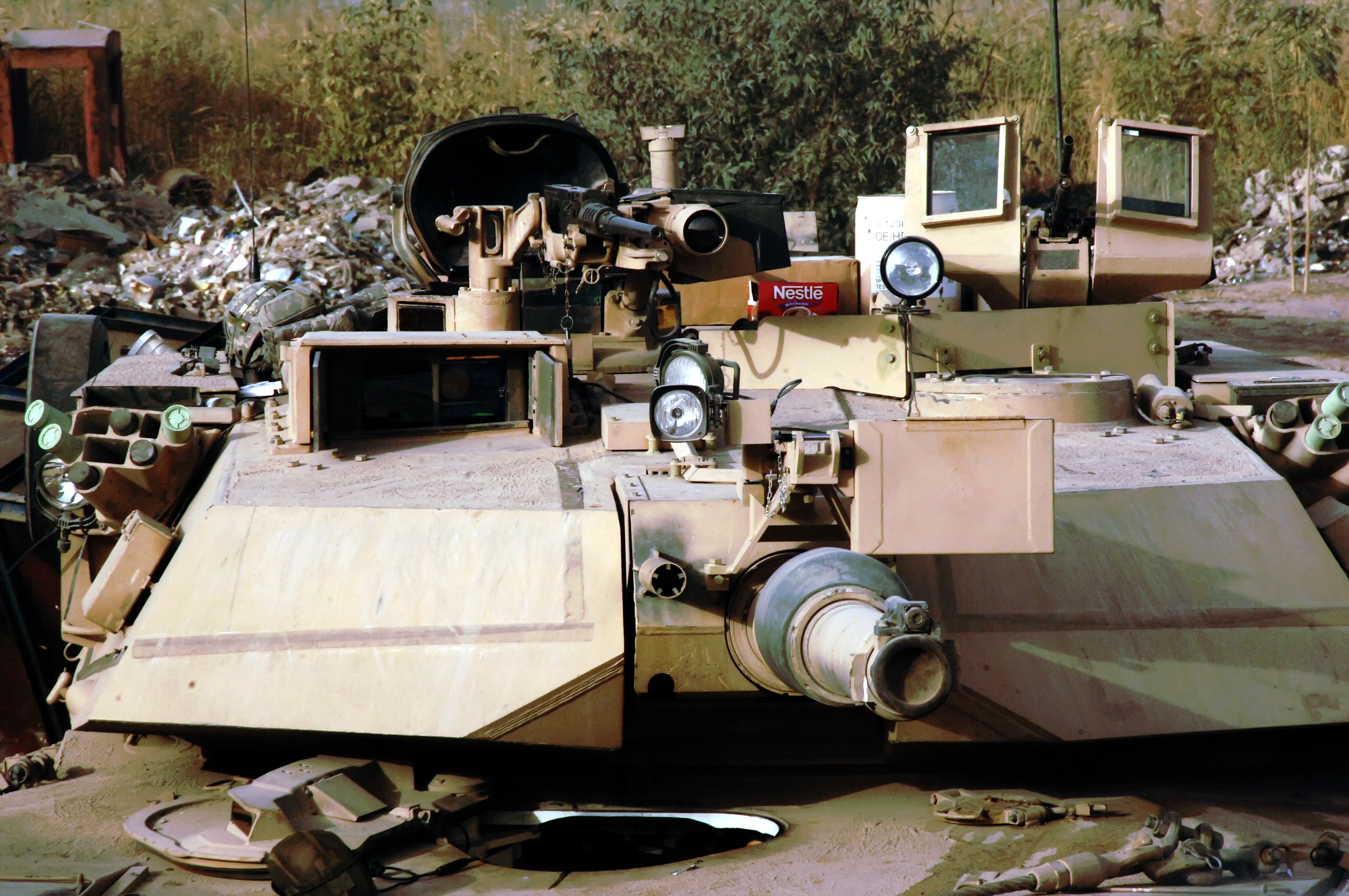
- Two M250 grenade launchers equipped on either side of the M1A1 Abrams's turret
- Type: Fixed array grenade launcher
- Place of origin: United Kingdom

Service history
- Used by: United States

Specifications
- Cartridge: 66 mm M82 smoke grenade
- Barrels: 6

The M250 is a six-barrel 66-millimeter grenade launchers (the British No. 19 Mk 2 design) used on US Army M1 Abrams tank, USMC M1A1s used an eight-barreled version, known as the M257. Which the Bradley Infantry Fighting Vehicles also use M257. The M250 is designed to fire M82 smoke grenades.

The M257 is also used on the M8 armored gun system.

The launchers are controlled from the commander's seat. Pressing a button launches 3 grenades from both sides of the M1, and pressing both buttons will launch all 6 grenades from both sides, equating to 12 in total. It is launched 30 meters from the tank, and provides a hail of smoke.
