= Chobham Common =

Location near Chobham, Surrey, of a British tank research centre

Coordinates: 51.373°N 0.604°W

- Site of Special Scientific Interest
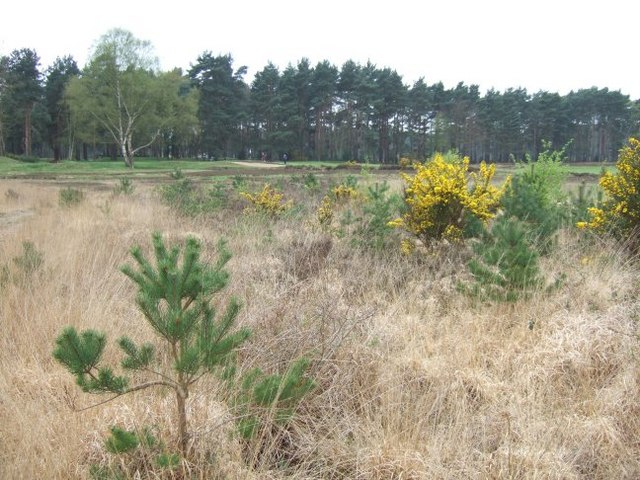
- Location of Chobham Common.
- Area of search: Surrey
- Grid reference: SU 973 647
- Interest: Biological
- Area: 655.7 hectares (1,620 acres)
- Notification date: 1993
- Location map: Magic Map

Chobham Common is a 655.7-hectare (1,620-acre) biological Site of Special Scientific Interest north of Chobham in Surrey. It is a Nature Conservation Review site, Grade I and a national nature reserve. It is part of the Thames Basin Heaths Special Protection Area and the Thursley, Ash, Pirbright and Chobham Special Area of Conservation. It contains three scheduled monuments. Most of the site is managed by the Surrey Wildlife Trust as the Chobham Common nature reserve, but the SSSI also includes a small private reserve managed by the Trust, Gracious Pond.

== Animals ==
- 26 species of mammal have been recorded on the site including the nationally rare water vole.
- 116 species of bird have been recorded. The Common is a nationally important breeding area for European nightjar, woodlark and Dartford warbler.
- 9 species of reptiles and amphibians have been recorded, including adders and the nationally rare sand lizard.
- The Common is nationally important for its invertebrate fauna being the best site in the UK for spiders, hymenoptera (bees wasp and ants) and ladybirds – it is one of the last two sites on the mainland UK for the red barbed ant Formica rufibarbis.
- 23 species of dragonfly
- 33 species of butterfly including large colonies of the rare silver studded blue have been recorded.

== Plants ==
- 390 species of vascular plant
- A good assemblages of bryophytes, lichens and fungi have been recorded.
  - Of most note are the marsh club moss (Lycopodiella inundata) and Deptford pink (Dianthus armeria)
- A good assemblages of wetland species including sundews (Drosera) and marsh gentian (Gentiana pneumonanthe), and of heathland road verge species.

== History ==
Peat and tumuli at the site suggest that, like other non-mountainous heaths, Chobham Common was transformed from to mostly shrubs, grass and bog when late Paleolithic farmers and wood-gatherers cleared much of the primary woodland that before their arrival cloaked the country. This exposed and degraded the fragile topsoils of the site, creating the conditions favoured by heathland. After the initial clearance the area would have been kept free of trees by grazing and fuel gathering. The specific earliest periods of occupation were the Neolithic period and the Bronze Age; analysis of peat cores from areas with similar geology and patterns of settlement elsewhere in southern Britain would suggest the heathland on Chobham Common emerged at some time during these periods.

An inclosure award was made by Parliament in 1855 of part to the Earl of Onslow outright, the rest, for example, in 1911 comprising "several thousand acres of common land" was uninclosed but associated with his land, at which time Chobham remained a large parish (i.e. village or town) in southern England, covering 9,057 acres (3,665 ha).

In addition to the Great Camp of 1853, the common also hosted the Battle of Chobham Common in September 1871, as part of the Autumn Manoeuvres of that year. During the First World War, trenching exercises were held in August 1915 in advance of Kitchener's Third Army's mobilisation in France.

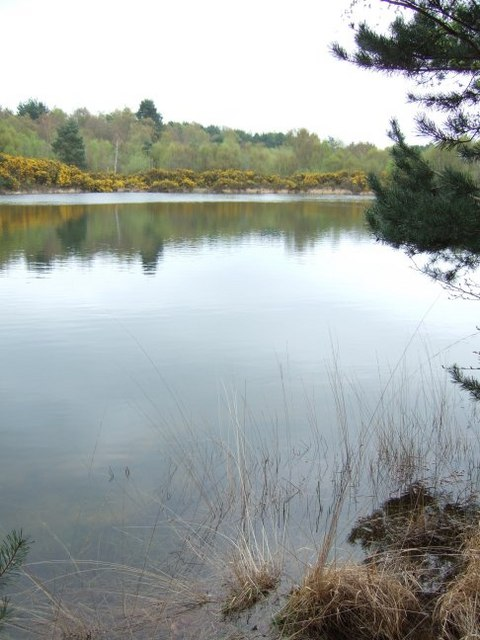
Lake at Chobham Common

Chobham Common was used by the military during the 1920s and 1930s, and throughout the Second World War. Captured enemy tanks were also tested in the common as was equipment to detonate land mines using flails and probably caused the significant damage that led to reseeding.

Immediately after the Second World War, the southern part was ploughed and seeded with an annual grass to allow the natural vegetation to re-establish, while the area north of Staple Hill, which was not as heavily damaged, was allowed to recover naturally. By the 1950s, plants and associated small animals were recovering well. At this time the common was heavily grazed by rabbits with little scrub and large areas of close-cropped heather and gorse. Myxomatosis reached the area in 1955 and consequently the heather and gorse on Chobham Common grew and scrub began to develop. By the 1960s scrub including brambles was starting to become a problem. Surrey County Council purchased the slightly reduced area comprising the common from William Onslow, 6th Earl of Onslow for £1 per acre by in 1966.

=== Monuments ===
- There are three scheduled monuments on Chobham Common: a Bronze Age barrow, and two earthworks of unknown date and origin known as "The Beegardens".
- Queen Victoria reviewed troops encamped on the Common, including the Light Brigade (famous from the "Charge of the Light Brigade"), before their departure to the Crimea during the Crimean War in 1853. The Victoria Monument erected on the site in 1901 commemorates this review.

== Maintenance ==
The survival of Chobham Common as an extensive area of lowland heath is largely due to the historic isolation of the Chobham area where traditional heathland management continued until the early twentieth century. While turbary (turf cutting) was still practised on a small scale at the beginning of the twentieth century it had ceased to be an important factor in the management of the Common by that time. Rough grazing and the cutting of heather, gorse and small trees began to decline after 1914 and had almost completely ended by the time of the Second World War. Photographic evidence and verbal reports indicate that during the early part of the twentieth century large tracts of Calluna vulgaris (heather) with extensive areas of wet heath and open bog dominated the Common. There was little scrub and the only trees of any great size were at the Clump on Staple Hill and the Lone Pine to the south of the Beegarden.

=== Management ===
In 1984, Surrey County Council produced the first management plan for Chobham Common which acknowledged invading scrub, fire and erosion as the main threats to the site. The Surrey Trust for Nature Conservation (now renamed the Surrey Wildlife Trust) had carried out small-scale scrub clearance work from 1974 onwards and Surrey County Council began clearing scrub on the Common from the 1970s onwards; however despite their best efforts the scrub continued to advance. The 1984 Management Plan described birch and pine invasion as possibly the most serious problem for nature conservation on the common, but concluded that widespread control was difficult to justify financially, and that intervention would be limited to the more significant open habitats and to places where tree cover could be held at an acceptable level at low cost.

From the late 1980s, a more aggressive approach to scrub management was adopted together with more active conservation management starting with the large scale annual events for schools and volunteers such as the "Purge the Pine" and "Free Christmas Tree" events. These involved more than 1,500 volunteers in some years and reduced the threat to the Common from pine invasion, birch remained a major threat to the site.

The 1992 Management Plan took a much more positive approach to conservation management of Chobham Common. In the same year the site was proposed as a national nature reserve (NNR) and a substantial grant covering a ten-year period was awarded to Surrey County Council under the Countryside Stewardship Scheme for the management of 280 hectares of the Common. The scheme was extended to cover the whole NNR for a further ten years in October 2002. At the time of writing at least seventeen hectares of scrub management takes place each year together with at least twenty hectares of conservation mowing, and bracken control. Bare ground creation and heather cutting, and pond, scrape and pool creation are also carried out to enhance bio-diversity. The restoration of conservation grazing on Chobham Common is seen as a priority by site managers.

== Fire ==
Fires occurred fairly regularly during the 1950s and 1960s and the whole of Chobham Common was seriously damaged by major fires in the early and mid-1970s which caused the loss of the smooth snake (Coronella austriaca) and sand lizard from the site and allowed extensive areas of purple moor grass and bracken to establish. Since 1976, a network of fire tracks and firebreaks has been created and progressively upgraded. Since 1990 rangers and volunteers have fire watched during periods of high risk and in 2006 the rangers were equipped with a fire fighting system. These measures together with close liaison with the Surrey Fire Service have served to reduce both the frequency and scale of fires on the site.

The major utilities that cross Chobham Common were constructed during the 1950s and early 1960s. The M3 motorway was completed in 1974 cutting the site in half. Some attempts were made at mitigation work at the time, but with hindsight they were both inappropriate and inadequate and large blocks of gorse (Ulex europeaus) developed in the zone of disturbance on either side of the motorway creating further fragmentation of the site and causing serious fire risks. Following serious fires in 2001 and 2002 the Department for Transport provided funding for clearance of the gorse in the zone of disturbance and this area is mown annually to suppress any gorse regrowth.

Strong summer heat can occur to dry out the long grass, shrubs and trees of acidic heath soil. When a fire breaks out, Surrey Fire and Rescue Service (in the case of the major May 2010 fire attracting rubbernecking, Surrey Police and Hampshire Fire and Rescue assisted) extinguish it in a range of vehicles and teams.

In August 2020, a fire on the common spread to the golf course at the Wentworth Club causing the abandonment of the final event of the Rose Ladies Series.

== Erosion mitigation ==
The first car parks on Chobham Common were created in 1936 at Staple Hill and south of the Monument. After the Second World War, the recreational use of the Common grew dramatically. This recreational use developed in an ad-hoc manner with walkers and horse riders creating tracks then abandoning them for new routes as they gullied and became impassable, causing wide scale erosion of the site.

It is also reported that during the 1950s and 1960s visitors regularly took vehicles onto Chobham Common further adding to the problem. An aerial photograph dated 1964 clearly shows severe erosion problems on Tank Hill and Staple Hill. By the time Surrey County Council acquired Chobham Common in 1968 there were nine car parks on the area covered by this plan. Initially the Council wished to develop a country park but these plans were soon dropped in favour of informal recreation and nature conservation.

Erosion and disturbance continued to be serious problems through the 1970s and 1980s. While attempts to restrict horse riding proved unsuccessful, by the late 1980s both walkers and riders were showing a marked preference for the growing network of high quality fire tracks.

In 1992, a consultative process began to resolve long running conflicts of interest between horse riders and other users, and to rationalise the rights of way networks in order to meet the needs of visitors while protecting sensitive habitats and species. Following a public enquiry in 1996 the present network of rights of way and agreed horse rides which incorporates the fire track network was installed. Since then there have been few serious erosion problems and disturbance has been greatly reduced.

== Access ==
Chobham Common is open to the public, has six car parks, an extensive network of footpaths, bridleways, other tracks and three self-guided trails.

=== Rail access ===
There is a half hourly service at the Longcross railway station, hourly on a Sunday. Alternatives are Virginia Water and Sunningdale.

== In popular culture ==
The site has featured in many film productions, including in the Hammer Horror films. Productions filmed in the area include the 1957 film Quatermass 2, The Hound of the Baskervilles (1959), the biographical epic Lawrence of Arabia (1962), Carry On Cowboy (1965), Frankenstein Created Woman (1967), The Bed-Sitting Room (1969), Superman II (1980). More recently the site has been less used, with soundstage filming preferred. However, recent productions in the common include the fantasy drama series The WItcher, Britannia, and Mission: Impossible – The Final Reckoning (2025).
