= Main battle tank =

Tank designed for all primary combat roles

M1 Abrams

A main battle tank (MBT), also known as a battle tank, is a tank that fills the role of armour-protected direct fire and maneuver in many modern armies. Cold War-era development of more powerful engines, better suspension systems and lighter composite armour allowed for the design of a tank that had the firepower of a super-heavy tank, the armour protection of a heavy tank, and the mobility of a light tank, in a package with the weight of a medium tank. The first designated MBT was the British Chieftain tank, which during its development in the 1950s was re-designed as an MBT. (Note: "Chieftain, which until then had been called Medium Gun Tank No 2, was renamed the Main Battle Tank".) Throughout the 1960s and 1970s, the MBT replaced almost all other types of tanks, leaving only some specialist roles to be filled by lighter designs or other types of armoured fighting vehicles.

Main battle tanks are a key component of modern armies. Modern MBTs seldom operate alone, as they are organized into armoured units that include the support of infantry, who may accompany the tanks in infantry fighting vehicles. They are also often supported by surveillance or ground-attack aircraft. The average weight of MBTs varies from country to country. The average weight of Western MBTs is usually greater than that of Russian or Chinese MBTs.

== History ==
=== Initial limited-role tank classes ===
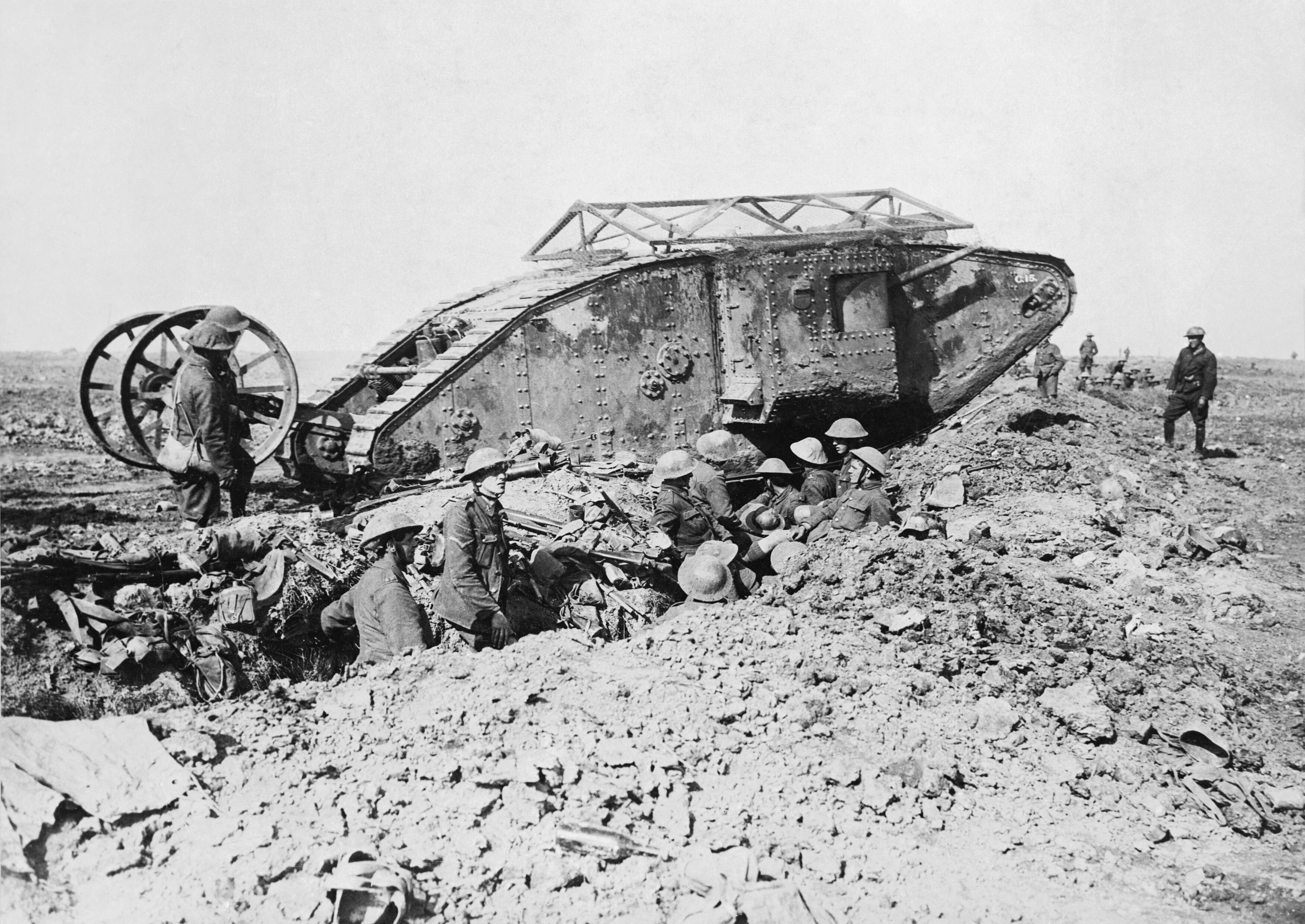
Early model Mark I tank at the Battle of Somme, 1916

During World War I, combining tracks, armour, and guns into a functional vehicle pushed the limits of mechanical technology. This limited the specific battlefield capabilities any one tank design could be expected to fulfill. A design could have good speed, armour, or firepower, but not all three together.

Facing the deadlock of trench warfare, the first tank designs focused on crossing wide trenches, requiring very long and large vehicles, such as the British Mark I tank and successors; these became known as heavy tanks. Tanks that focused on other combat roles were smaller, like the French Renault FT; these were light tanks or tankettes. Many late-war and inter-war tank designs diverged from these according to new, and mostly untried, concepts for future tank roles and tactics. Each nation tended to create its own list of tank classes with different intended roles, such as "cavalry tanks", "breakthrough tanks", "fast tanks", and "assault tanks". The British maintained cruiser tanks that in order to achieve high speed and hence manoeuvrability in the attack carried less armour, and infantry tanks which operating at infantryman pace could carry more armour.

=== Evolution of the general-purpose medium tank ===
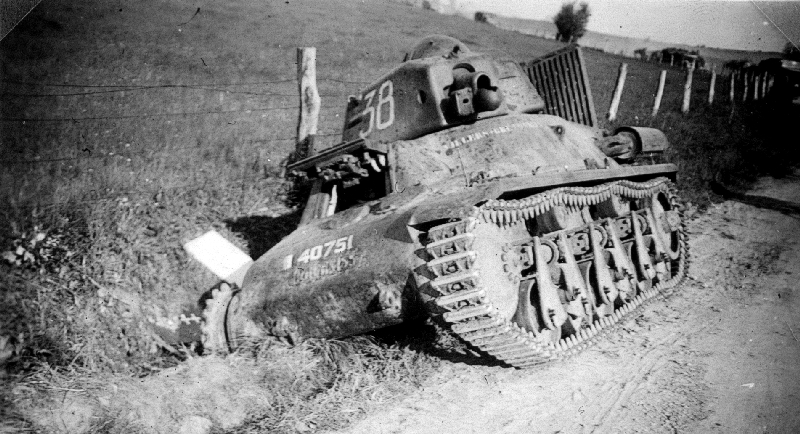
Abandoned French Hotchkiss H-39 light cavalry tank, Battle of France, 1940

After years of isolated and divergent development, the various interwar tank concepts were finally tested with the start of World War II. In the chaos of blitzkrieg, tanks designed for a single role often found themselves forced into battlefield situations they were ill-suited for. During the war, limited-role tank designs tended to be replaced by more general-purpose designs, enabled by improving tank technology. Tank classes became mostly based on weight (and the corresponding transport and logistical needs). This led to new definitions of heavy and light tank classes, with medium tanks covering the balance of those between. The German Panzer IV tank, designed before the war as a "heavy" tank for assaulting fixed positions, was redesigned during the war with armour and gun upgrades to allow it to take on anti-tank roles as well, and was reclassified as a medium tank.

The second half of World War II saw an increased reliance on general-purpose medium tanks, which became the bulk of the tank combat forces. Generally, these designs massed about 25–30 t (25–30 long tons; 28–33 short tons), were armed with cannons around 75 mm (3.0 in), and powered by engines in the 400–500 hp (300–370 kW) range. Notable examples include the Soviet T-34 (the most-produced tank at that time) and the US M4 Sherman.

Late war tank development placed increased emphasis on armour, armament, and anti-tank capabilities for medium tanks:

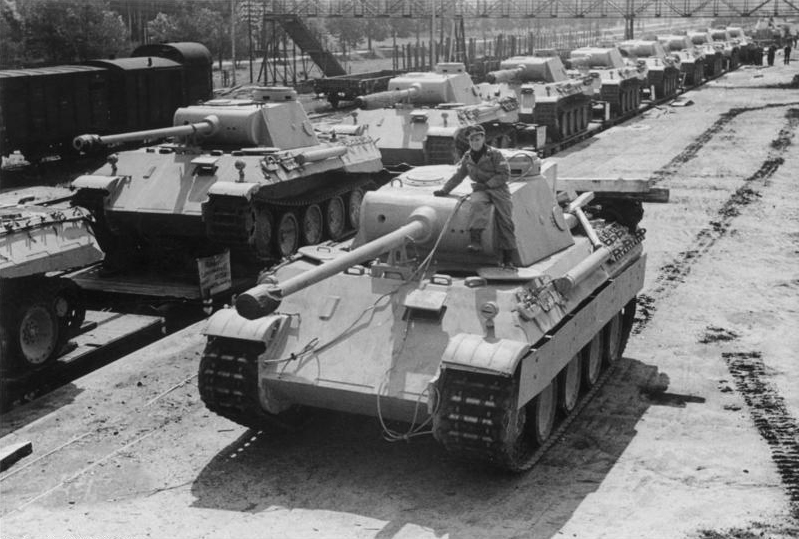
New Panther D tanks being loaded for transport to the Eastern Front

- The German Panther tank, designed to counter the Soviet T-34, had both armament and armour increased over previous medium tanks. Unlike previous Panzer designs, its frontal armour was sloped for increased effectiveness. It also was equipped with the high-velocity long-barreled 75 mm KwK 42 L/70 gun that was able to defeat the armour of all but the heaviest Allied tank at long range. The powerful Maybach HL230 P30 engine and robust running gear meant that even though the Panther tipped the scales at 50 t (49 long tons; 55 short tons) – sizeable for its day – it was actually quite manoeuvrable, offering better off-road speed than the Panzer IV. However, its rushed development led to reliability and maintenance issues.
- The Soviet T-44 incorporated many of the lessons learned with the extensive use of the T-34 model, and some of those modifications were used in the first MBTs, like a modern torsion suspension, instead of the Christie suspension version of the T-34, and a transversally mounted engine that simplified its gearbox. It is also seen as a direct predecessor of the T-54. Unlike the T-34, the T-44 had a suspension sturdy enough to be able to mount a 100 mm (3.9 in) cannon.
- The American M26 Pershing, a medium tank of 40 short tons (36 t; 36 long tons) to replace the M4 Sherman, innovated in US tanks many features common on post-war MBTs. These features include an automatic transmission mounted in the rear, torsion bar suspension and had an early form of a powerpack, combining an engine and transmission into a compact package. The M26, however, suffered from a relatively weak engine for its weight (effectively the same engine as the 10 t (9.8 long tons; 11 short tons) lighter M4A3 Sherman), and as a result was somewhat underpowered. The design of the M26 had profound influence on American postwar medium and main battle tanks: "The M26 formed the basis for the postwar generation of US battle tanks from the M46 through the M47, M48, and M60 series."

=== British universal tank ===
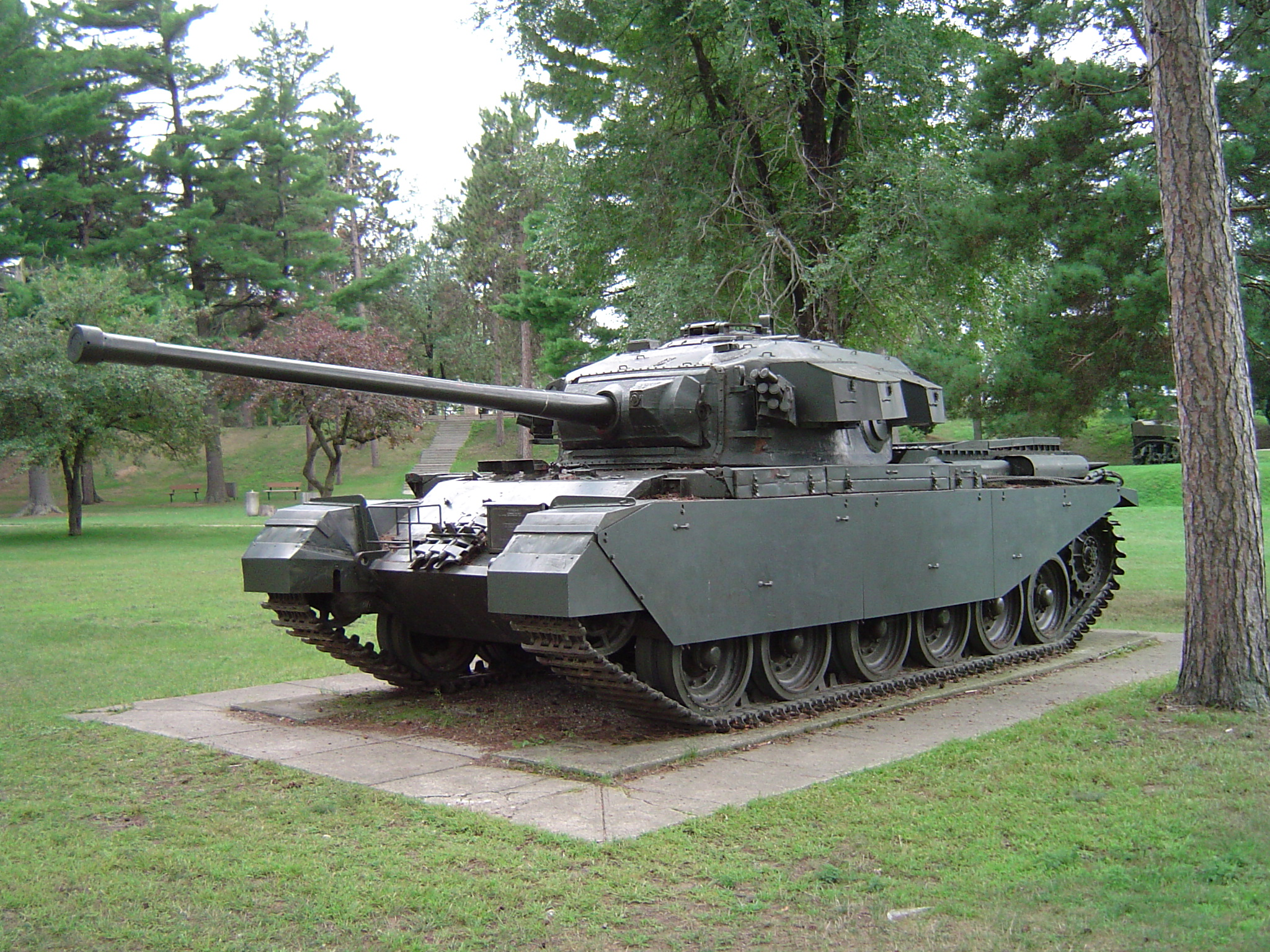
Centurion Mk 5

Britain had continued on the path of parallel development of cruiser tanks and infantry tanks. Development of the Rolls-Royce Meteor engine for the Cromwell tank, combined with efficiency savings elsewhere in the design, almost doubled the horsepower for cruiser tanks. This led to speculation of a "Universal Tank", able to take on the roles of both a cruiser and an infantry tank by combining heavy armour and manoeuvrability.

Field Marshal Bernard Montgomery is acknowledged as the main advocate of the British universal tank concept as early as 1943, according to the writings of Giffard Le Quesne Martel, but little progress was made beyond development of the basic Cromwell cruiser tank that eventually led to the Centurion. The Centurion, at the time designated "heavy cruiser" and later "medium gun tank" was designed for mobility and firepower at the expense of armour, but more engine power permitted more armour protection, so the Centurion could also operate as an infantry tank, doing so well that development of a new tank was rendered unnecessary.

The Centurion, entering service just as World War II finished, was a multi-role tank that subsequently formed the main armoured element of the British Army of the Rhine, the armed forces of the British Empire and Commonwealth forces, and subsequently many other nations through exports, whose cost was met largely by the US. The introduction of the 84 mm (3.3 in) 20-pounder gun in 1948 gave the tank a significant advantage over other tanks of the era, paving the way for a new tank classification, the main battle tank, which gradually superseded previous weight and armament classes.

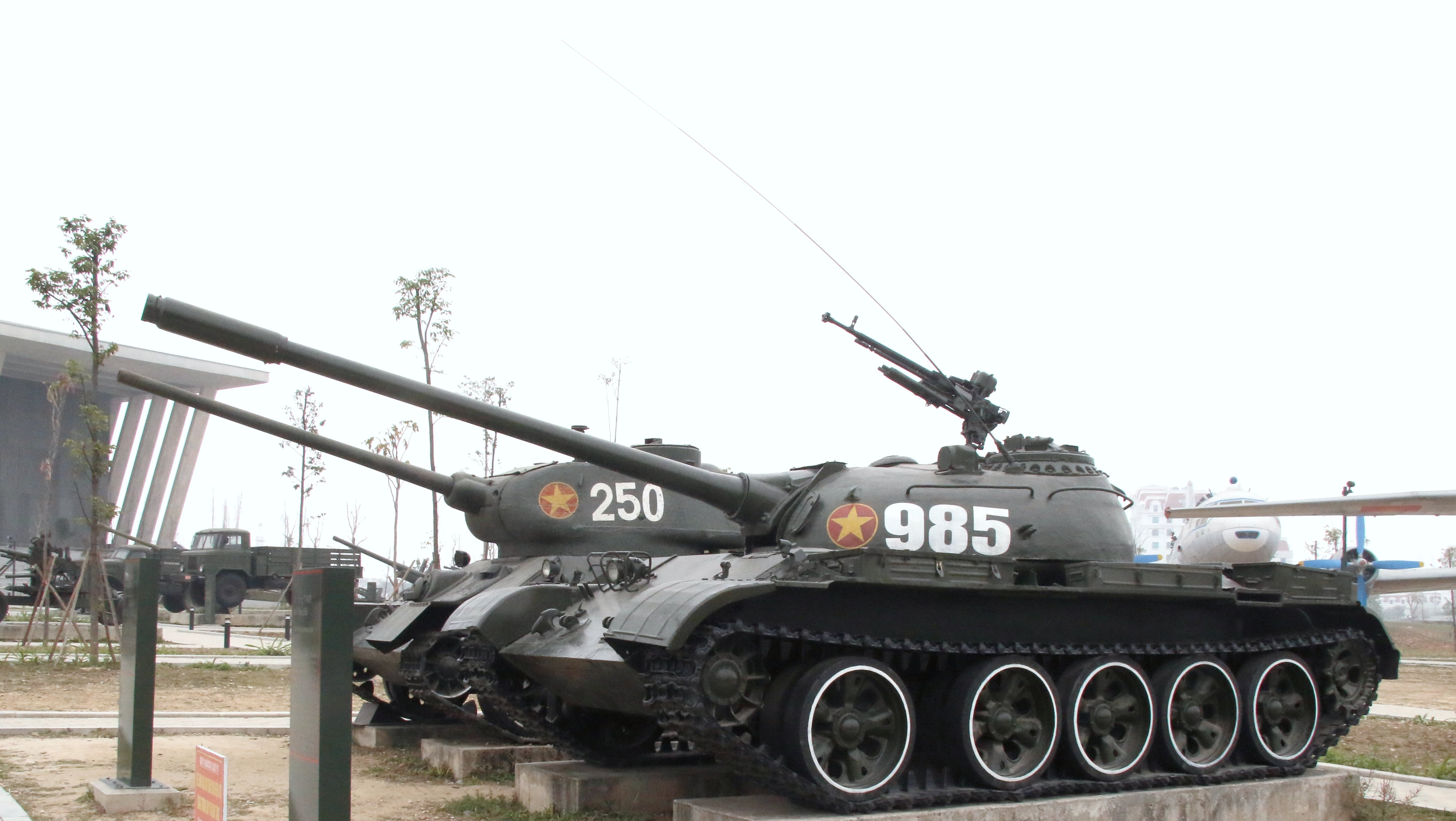
Introduction of the main battle tank definition with the T-54/T-55 during Cold War comprehensively superseded World War II medium tanks such as the T-34.

=== Cold War ===
A surplus of effective WWII-era designs in other forces, notably the US and the Soviet Union, led to slower introductions of similar designs on their part. By the early 1950s, these designs were clearly no longer competitive, especially in a world of shaped charge weapons, and new designs rapidly emerged from most armed forces.

The Quebec conference in 1957 between the US, UK and Canada identified the MBT as the route for development rather than separate medium and heavy tanks.

The concept of the medium tank gradually evolved into the MBT in the 1960s, as it was realized that medium tanks could carry guns (such as the American 90 mm (3.5 in), Soviet 100 mm (3.9 in), and especially the British L7 105 mm (4.1 in)) that could penetrate any practical level of armour then existing at long range. Also, the heaviest tanks were unable to use most existing bridges. The World War II concept of heavy tanks, armed with the most powerful guns and heaviest armour, became obsolete because the large tanks were too expensive and just as vulnerable to damage by mines, bombs, rockets, and artillery. Likewise, World War II had shown that lightly armed and armoured tanks were of limited value in most roles. Even reconnaissance vehicles had shown a trend towards heavier weight and greater firepower during World War II; speed was not a substitute for armour and firepower.

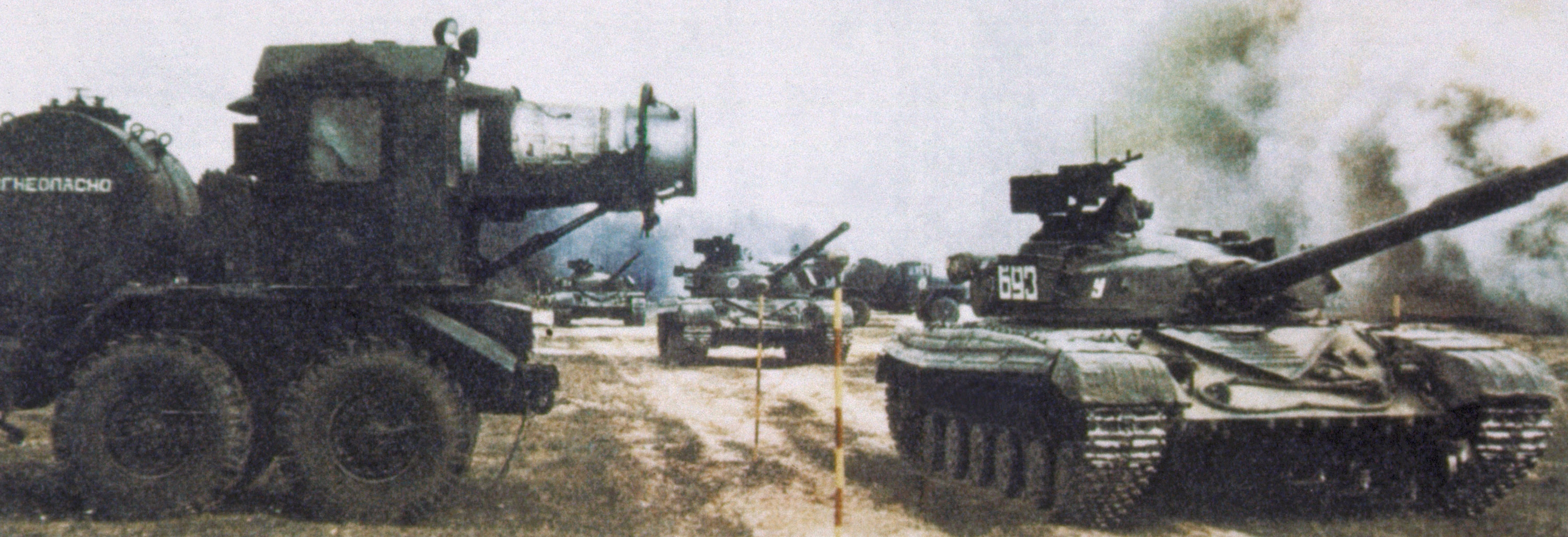
Soviet T-64 undergoing decontamination

An increasing variety of anti-tank weapons and the perceived threat of a nuclear war prioritized the need for additional armour. The additional armour prompted the design of even more powerful guns. The main battle tank thus took on the role the British had once called the "universal tank", exemplified by the Centurion, filling almost all battlefield roles. Typical main battle tanks were as well armed as any other vehicle on the battlefield, highly mobile, and well armoured. Yet they were cheap enough to be built in large numbers. The first Soviet main battle tank was the T-64A (the T-54/55 and T-62 were considered "medium" tanks) and the first American nomenclature-designated MBT was the M60 tank.

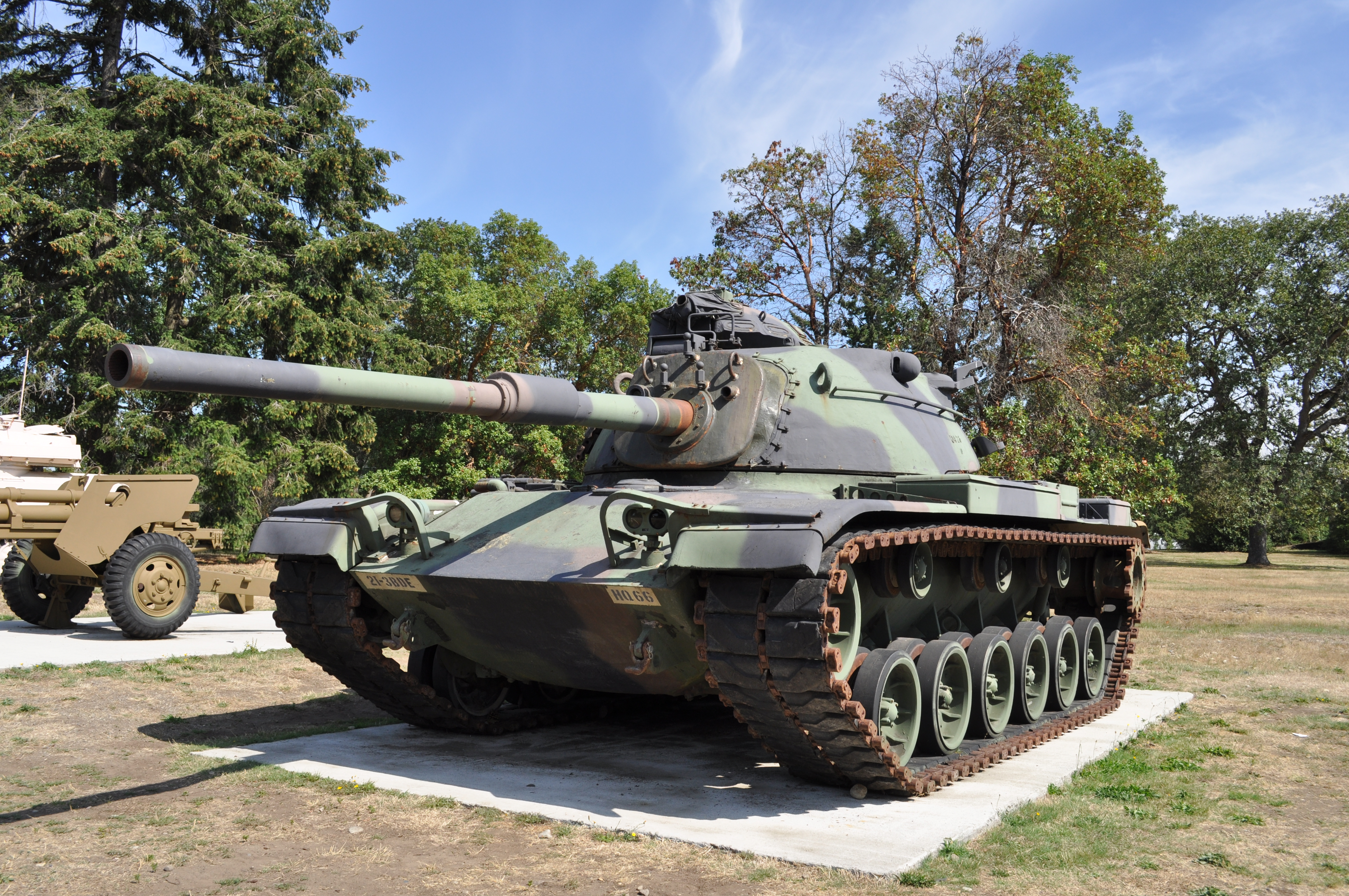
A very early model M60 with M48 turret and 105mm cannon

Anti-tank weapons rapidly outpaced armour developments. By the 1960s, anti-tank rounds could penetrate a meter of steel so as to make the application of traditional rolled homogeneous armour unpragmatic. The first solution to this problem was the composite armor of Soviet T-64 tank, which included steel-glass-reinforced textolite-steel sandwich in heavily sloped glacis plates, and steel turret with aluminum inserts, which helped to resist both high-explosive anti-tank (HEAT) and APDS shells of the era. Later came British Chobham armour. This composite armour used layers of ceramics and other materials to help attenuate the effects of HEAT munitions. Another threat came by way of the widespread use of helicopters in battle. Before the advent of helicopters, armour was heavily concentrated to the front of the tank. This new threat caused designs to distribute armour on all sides of the tank (also having the effect of protecting the vehicle's occupants from nuclear explosion radiation).

By the late 1970s, MBTs were manufactured by China, France, West Germany, Britain, India, Italy, Japan, the Soviet Union, Sweden, Switzerland, and the United States.

The Soviet Union made novel advancements to the weapon systems including mechanical autoloaders and anti-tank guided missiles. Autoloaders were introduced to replace the human loader, permitting the turret to be reduced in size, making the tank smaller and less visible as a target, while missile systems were added to extend the range at which a vehicle could engage a target and thereby enhance the first-round hit probability.

The United States's experience in the Vietnam War contributed to the idea among army leadership that the role of the main battle tank could be fulfilled by attack helicopters. During the Vietnam War, helicopters and missiles competed with MBTs for research money.

Though the Persian Gulf War reaffirmed the role of main battle tanks, MBTs were outperformed by the attack helicopter. Other strategists considered that the MBT was entirely obsolete in light of the efficiency and speed with which coalition forces neutralized Iraqi armour.

=== Asymmetrical warfare ===
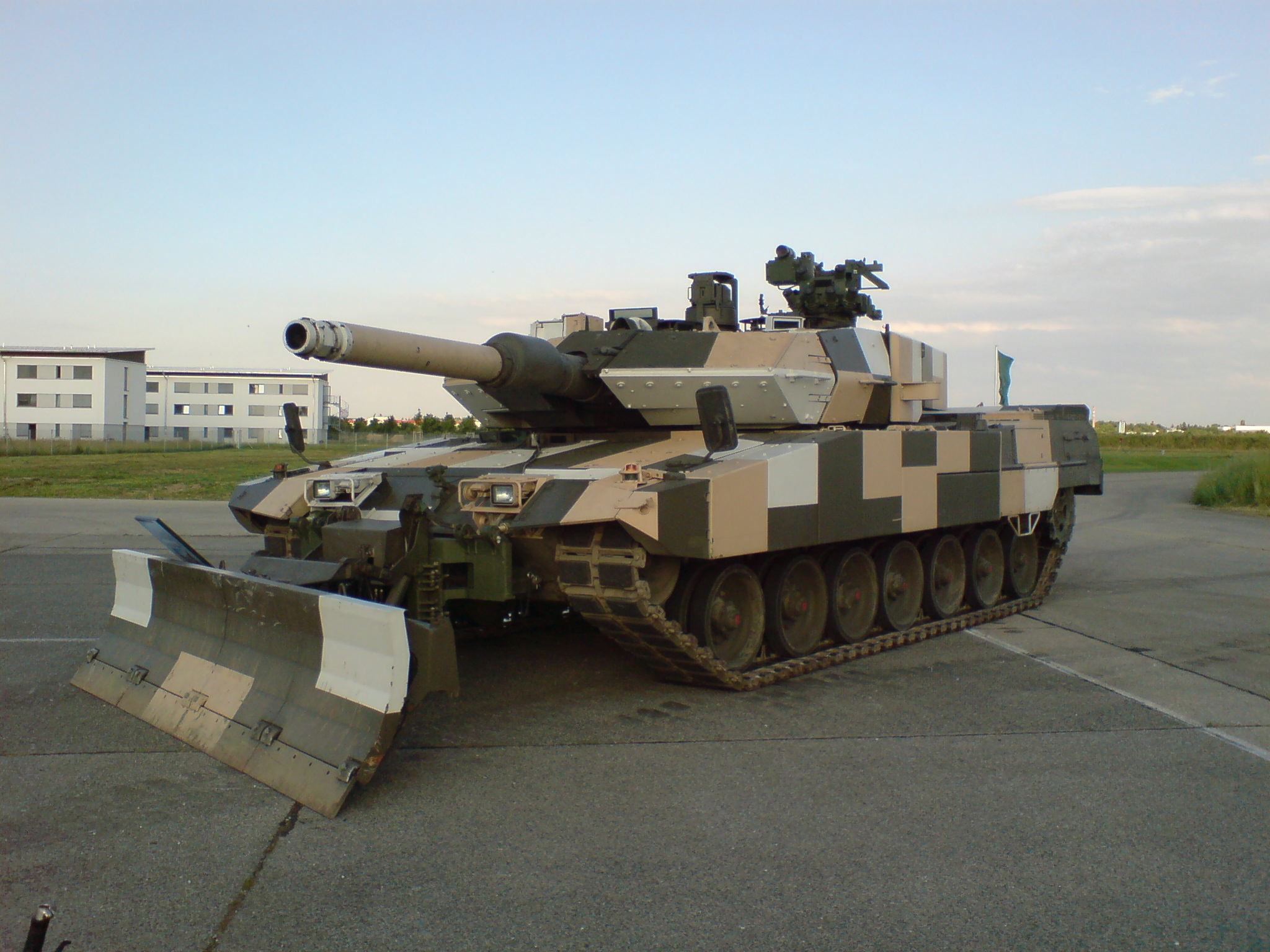
A German Leopard 2 in the PSO-version, prepared for asymmetric warfare

In asymmetric warfare, threats such as improvised explosive devices and mines have proven effective against MBTs. In response, nations that face asymmetric warfare, such as Israel, are reducing the size of their tank fleet and procuring more advanced models. Conversely, some insurgent groups like Hezbollah themselves operate main battle tanks, such as the T-72.

The United States Army used 1,100 M1 Abrams in the course of the Iraq War. They proved to have an unexpectedly high vulnerability to improvised explosive devices. A relatively new type of remotely detonated mine, the explosively formed penetrator, was used with some success against American armoured vehicles. However, with upgrades to their rear armour, M1s proved to be valuable in urban combat; at the Second Battle of Fallujah the United States Marines brought in two extra companies of M1s. Britain deployed its Challenger 2 tanks to support its operations in southern Iraq.

Advanced armour has reduced crew fatalities but has not improved vehicle survivability. Small unmanned turrets on top of the cupolas called remote controlled weapon stations armed with machine guns or mortars provide improved defence and enhance crew survivability. Experimental tanks with unmanned turrets locate crew members in the heavily armoured hull, improving survivability and reducing the vehicle's profile.

Technology is reducing the weight and size of the modern MBT. A British military document from 2001 indicated that the British Army would not procure a replacement for the Challenger 2 because of a lack of conventional warfare threats in the foreseeable future. The obsolescence of the tank has been asserted, but the history of the late 20th and early 21st century suggested that MBTs were still necessary. During the Russian invasion of Ukraine, Western and Russian MBTs saw large-scale combat in large numbers.

== Design ==
The Organization for Security and Co-operation in Europe defines a main battle tank as "a self-propelled armoured fighting vehicle, capable of heavy firepower, primarily of a high muzzle velocity direct fire main gun necessary to engage armoured and other targets, with high cross-country mobility, with a high level of self-protection, and which is not designed and equipped primarily to transport combat troops."

=== Overview ===
1. Periscope
2. Gun mantlet
3. Coaxial gun
4. Bore evacuator
5. Main gun
6. Driver's optics
7. Driver's hatch
8. Glacis plate
9. Continuous track
10. Machine gun ammunition
11. Commander's machine gun
12. Hatch or Cupola
13. Gun turret
14. Turret ring
15. Hull
16. Engine air intake
17. Engine compartment
18. Side skirt
19. Drive sprocket
20. Link
21. Road wheel

=== Protection and Countermeasures ===
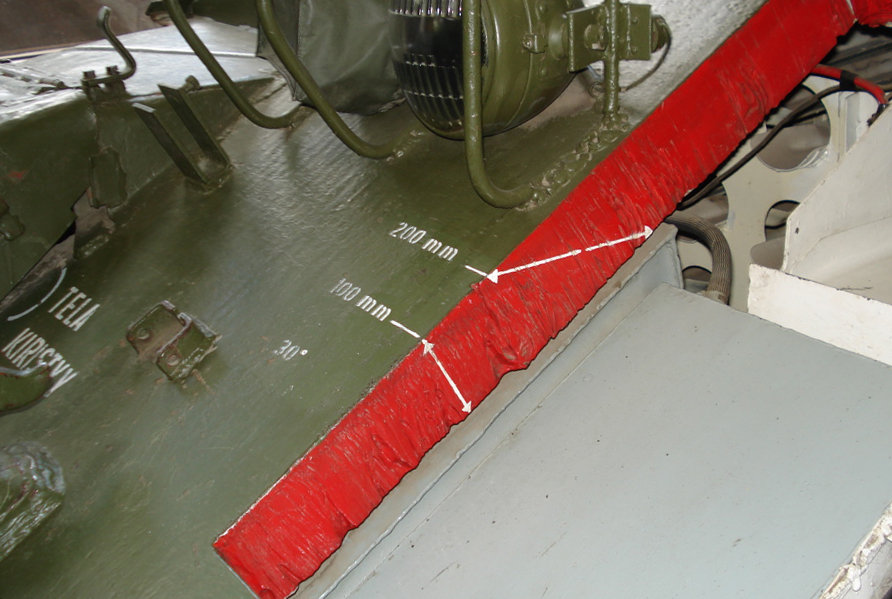
The sloped armor of this T-54 demonstrates how a round fired at the tank from the front would need to pass through 200mm worth of steel armor before penetrating it, even though the armor is itself only 100mm thick. The effective line of sight armor is therefore 200mm while the thickness of the steel is only 100mm.

Early main battle tanks relied on the thickness of the homogenous steel that made up the structure of the tank to provide its protection, and protection levels were determined by measuring the thickness of this armour.

By sloping or angling the armor of the tank, protection can be increased without making the armor itself thicker. By angling the armor away from the anticipated direction of incoming fire, the effective line of sight thickness of the armor is increased, which measures the thickness a projectile travels through an armor plate, rather than the thickness of the armor plate itself, with sloped armor requiring projectiles to penetrate a greater thickness of material. Such sloped armor is usually located and thickest on the front and turret sections of the tank while the sides and rear are typically flatter and thinner.

This difference in protection levels of steel armor is based on combat experience that most engagements that armored fighting vehicles, including MBTs, saw the majority of incoming fire hitting the tank from the frontal arc, with limited fire coming from the sides and rear, leading to the notion that these areas of the tank require the most amount of protection.

The thickness of armor has increased with successive MBTs. The British Centurion featured a frontal hull armor of approximately 76-108mm with a turret frontal armor of 152mm with its successor, the Chieftain, having increased the frontal armour thickness to 195mm which, when sloped, provided an effective thickness of around 350mm. Around this sae time the American M60A1 featured frontal hull armor of approximately 109mm, working out at around 258mm line of sight equivalent when sloped, and frontal turret armor of up to 254mm.

However increasing the thickness of this armor to achieve better levels of protection is not a practical solution, as by making the armor thicker, the overall weight of the tank increases, which brings with it challenges such as reduced range, speed and mobility.

Soviet tank designers realised that mobility could itself be a form of protection. By making the tank smaller, and thus a smaller target overall, the tank is a more difficult target for enemy forces to hit and being less exposed to enemy fire and easier to hide and conceal. The T-62 for example was about one meter shorter than an M60. It was estimated by Richard Ogorkiewicz in 1968 for example that the Swedish Stridsvagen 103 had a 30% lower probability of being hit by an enemy tank at 1,000 meters owing to its low profile shape. This has been noted to be a continued benefit for tanks fighting in the Russo-Ukrainian war where smaller MBT designs provide a smaller target for enemies to fire upon, especially when partially concealed behind terrain or obstacles.

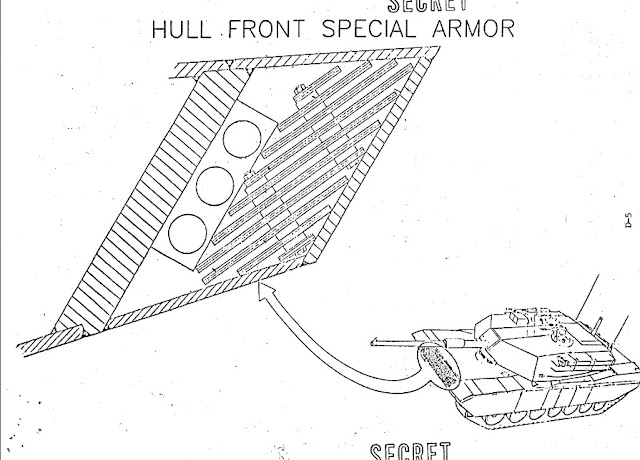
Diagram of how composite armor consists of outer steel encasing layers of composite materials such as plastics, fiberglass, ceramics and other non-metallic materials. These materials provide a level of protection comparable to steel armor while being far lighter and thinner.

In an effort to overcome the drawbacks of simply thickening the steel armor of the tank to add additional protection at the expense of increased weight, some early research and development into alternative forms of armor began in the 1950s, in particular with the American T-95 trialling a combination of metallic and non-metallic of amor such as fused silica glass encased between steel, as glass was found to be more than twice as effective at resisting the penetration of shaped charges relative to their weight than steel in certain applications.

This early form of composite armor, while not adopted, showed that MBT armor designs did not need to rely solely on sloped ever thicker steel armor to effectively protect a MBT from threats, and cast or welded armor parts encasing a package of alloys or other materials could provide better protection than steel armor of the same thickness. Soviet research at the Ioffe Institute at around the same time also found comparable results from similar research into alternative armor material, finding the penetration protection of high hardness ceramics was at about the same level as steel, yet these ceramics were far lighter, leading to far less dense armor.

The adoption of composite armor into MBT designs developed significantly in the 1960s and early 1970s, most notably with Britain's Chobham armor and Soviet composite armor systems including Combination K.

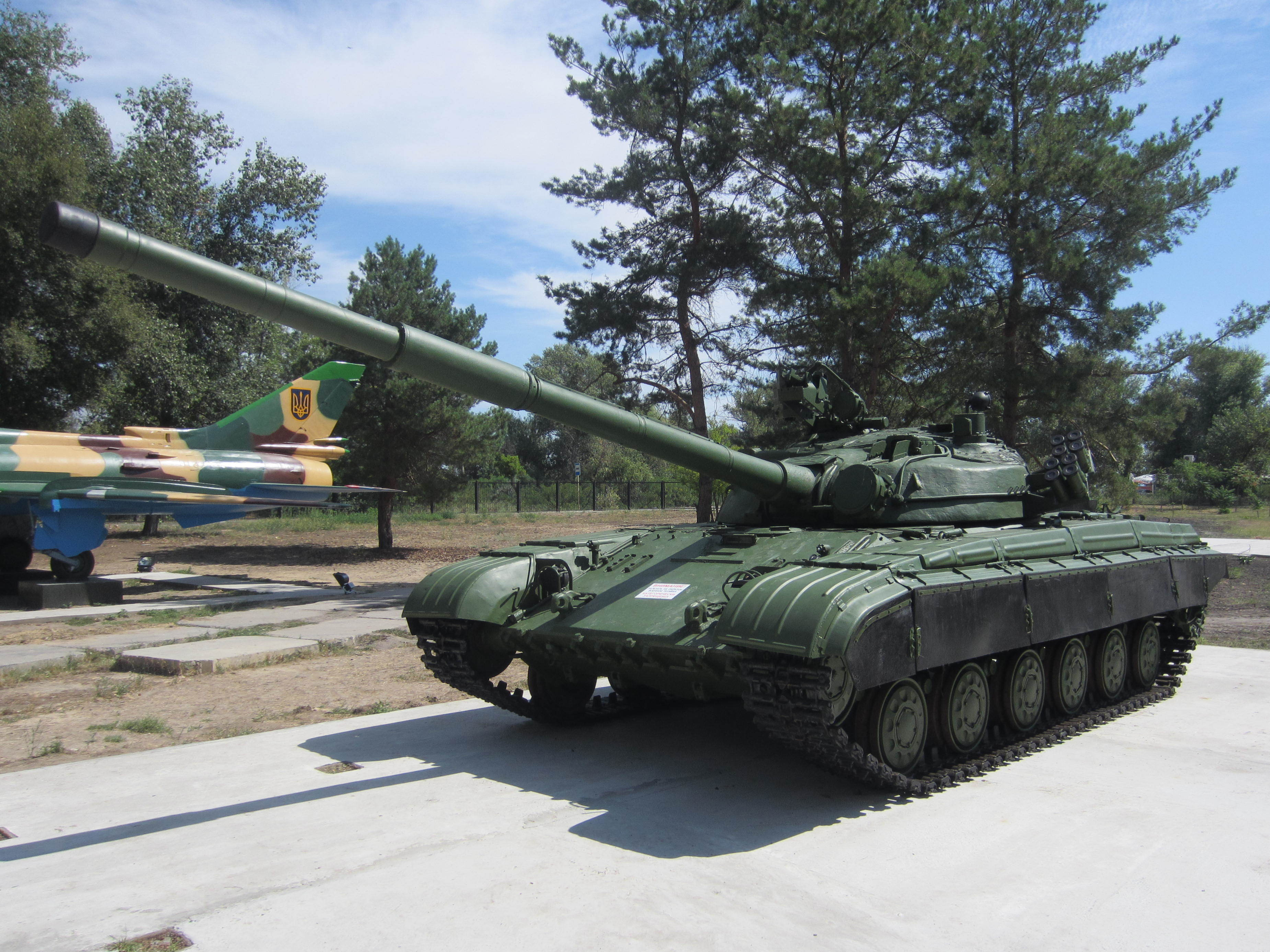
The T-64 was the first MBT to enter service using composite armor rather than traditional steel.

The early research Soviet designers undertook into understanding composite steel-ceramic armor were incorporated into Object 432, the precursor to the T-64, the first tank to enter service with composite armor in 1964. Object 432's armor consisted of an outer steel armor plate 80mm thick and an inner fiberglass reinforced plastic layer 140mm thick. This total thickness of the composite armor of 220mm provided protection against a shaped charge equivalent to 450mm of steel for the hull. This evolved into what became known as Combination K employed on the T-64, which encased a fiberglass and ceramic plates between steel inner and outer layers. The turret of Object 432 had two proposed designs, one with a cast steel outer plate with ultra porcelain ceramic inserts, estimated to provide 450mm worth of protection against shaped charges, and a second proposal of an outer layer of steel with an aluminium based filler providing 460mm worth of protection. Both designs were estimated to be over a tonne lighter than traditional steel armor providing the same level of protection. Initially the T-64 used the aluminium filled design however later versions used the ceramic filled turret and incorporated ceramic spheres as part of the composite arrangement.

British research into Chobham armor began in the early 1960s by the Military Vehicles and Engineering Establishment and was first trialled on the experimental FV 4211, a Chieftain tank modified by Royal Armament Research and Development Establishment in 1971 and led to the adoption of this composite armor on the US M1 Abrams tank which was in development at the same time, and then deployed on subsequent Challenger 1 tanks in 1983. While the exact composition of Chobham armor is classified, it is believed to consist of steel plates which encase multiple layers of non-metallic materials such as ceramic, plastics and aluminium and titanium alloys which was provided MBTs with a level of protection that steel armor on older MBTs could not with testing reportedly showing it could provide two to three times the protection of conventional steel armor against shaped charges for the same weight,meaning a tank with 200mm of Chobham armor could provide a level of protection equivalent to 560mm of conventional steel armor.

Another development in MBT protection has been the advent of Reactive Armor, which can be categorised between Explosive Reactive Armor, ERA, and Non-Explosive Reactive Armor, NERA. This is a method of protection designs to neutralise the impact of shaped charges and kinetic penetrators on the armor of a MBT to prevent penetration.

ERA consists of a slab or sheet of explosive material sandwiched between two metal plates forming a "brick" or "tile" of ERA mounted to the exterior of the MBT armor. When struck with enough force, the explosive component of the ERA tile detonates, sending the steel plates flying outward and disrupting the trajectory of the incoming munition. This can have the effect of either neutralising the energy of a warhead before it reaches the base armor of the MBT, such as with a HEAT round, or it can deflect the kinetic energy of a APDS/APFSDS kinetic energy penetrator away from the MBTs base armor before penetrating it, bending, distorting or even break the penetrator entirely.

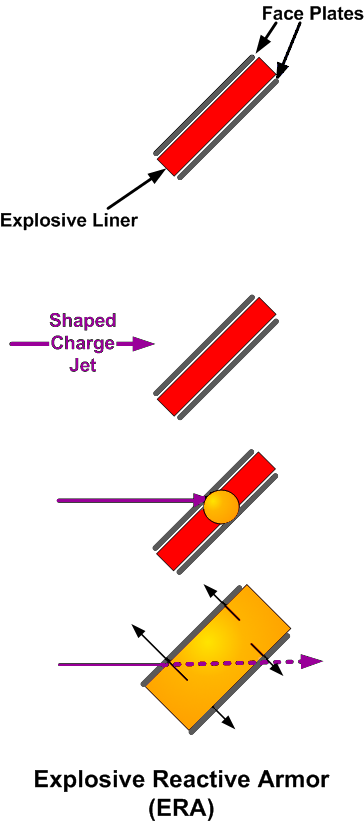
Diagram of how Explosive Reactive Armor, ERA, operates. A munition such as a jet from a shaped charge from a HEAT round or a kinetic penetrator from an APDS/APFSDS round impacts the ERA, causing the ERA to explode, preventing the munition striking the MBTs base armor.

Due to the explosive nature of the ERA anyone in an immediate vicinity of the explosion could be injured by the shrapnel of both the ERA explosion and premature detonation of a warhead or shattering of a kinetic penetrator as a result of the ERA being activated. An additional concern is that the underlying base armor on which the ERA is mounted needs to be sufficient to service the explosion should the ERA be activated. ERA modules can only be used once however, as once the tile has exploded, the area where it once was is no longer protected by ERA, leaving a potential vulnerable spot on the MBT armor to be attacked again as it does not protect against multiple hits to the same location. Tandem warheads can also potentially mitigate the effect of ERA, where a smaller explosive on the tip of the warhead detonates the ERA, before the larger main charge reaches it, leaving the underlying armour exposed to the munition.

ERA was first employed by Israel on their Magach and Sho't tanks in the 1982 Lebanon War where it was found that of the 60 tanks employed with ERA all but two that were hit by Syrian commandos were saved from total destruction as a result of the ERA. Similar findings of ERA improving MBT survivability were reported in Russian MBTs experience in Chechnya and more recently in Ukraine.

Most modern Russian, Chinese and former Warsaw pact countries employ ERA on their MBTs as a standard form of protection while most NATO countries tend to only install it as part of specialist upgrade packages rather than standard, believing the base protection of the composite armor of their MBTs is already satisfactory.

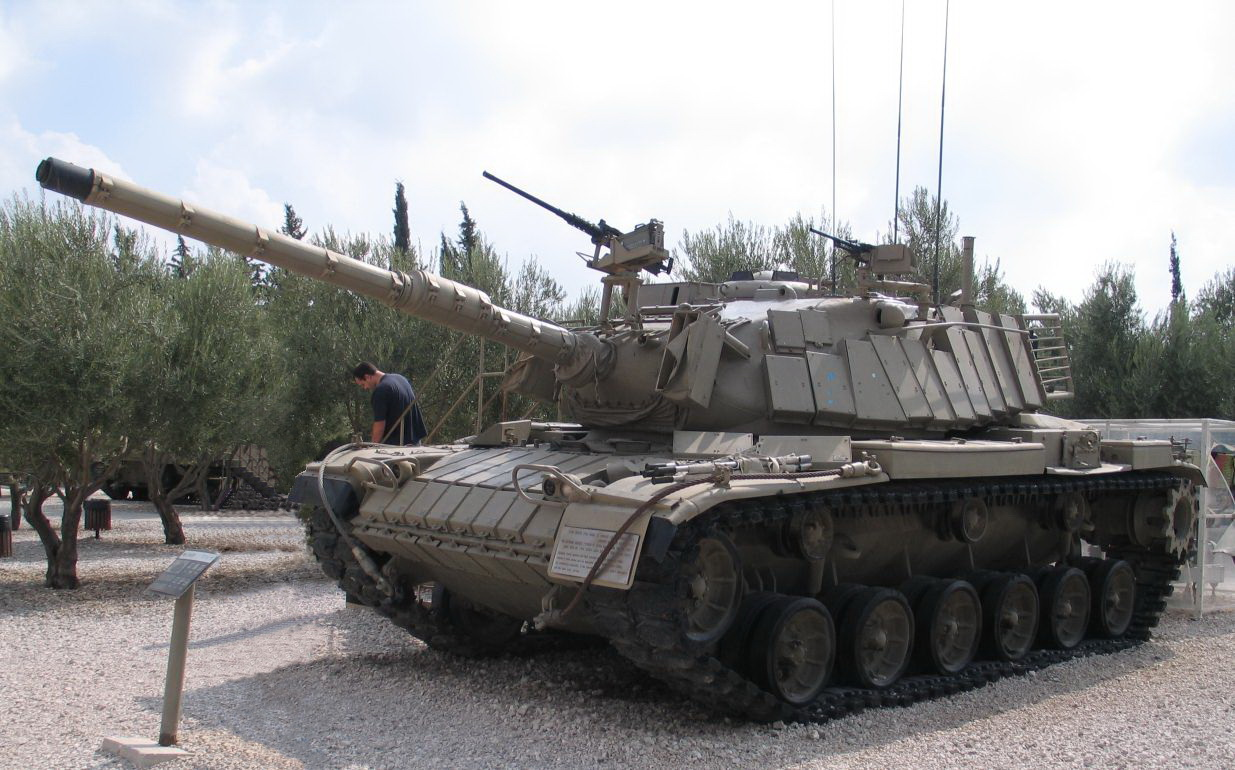
The Israeli Magach 6 a derivative of the American M60 MBT was, along with the Israeli Sho't, the first tank to use reactive armor, specifically Explosive Reactive Armor, in combat during the 1982 Lebanon War. The Blazer ERA 'tiles' developed by Rafael are visible on the front hull and along the side of the turret.

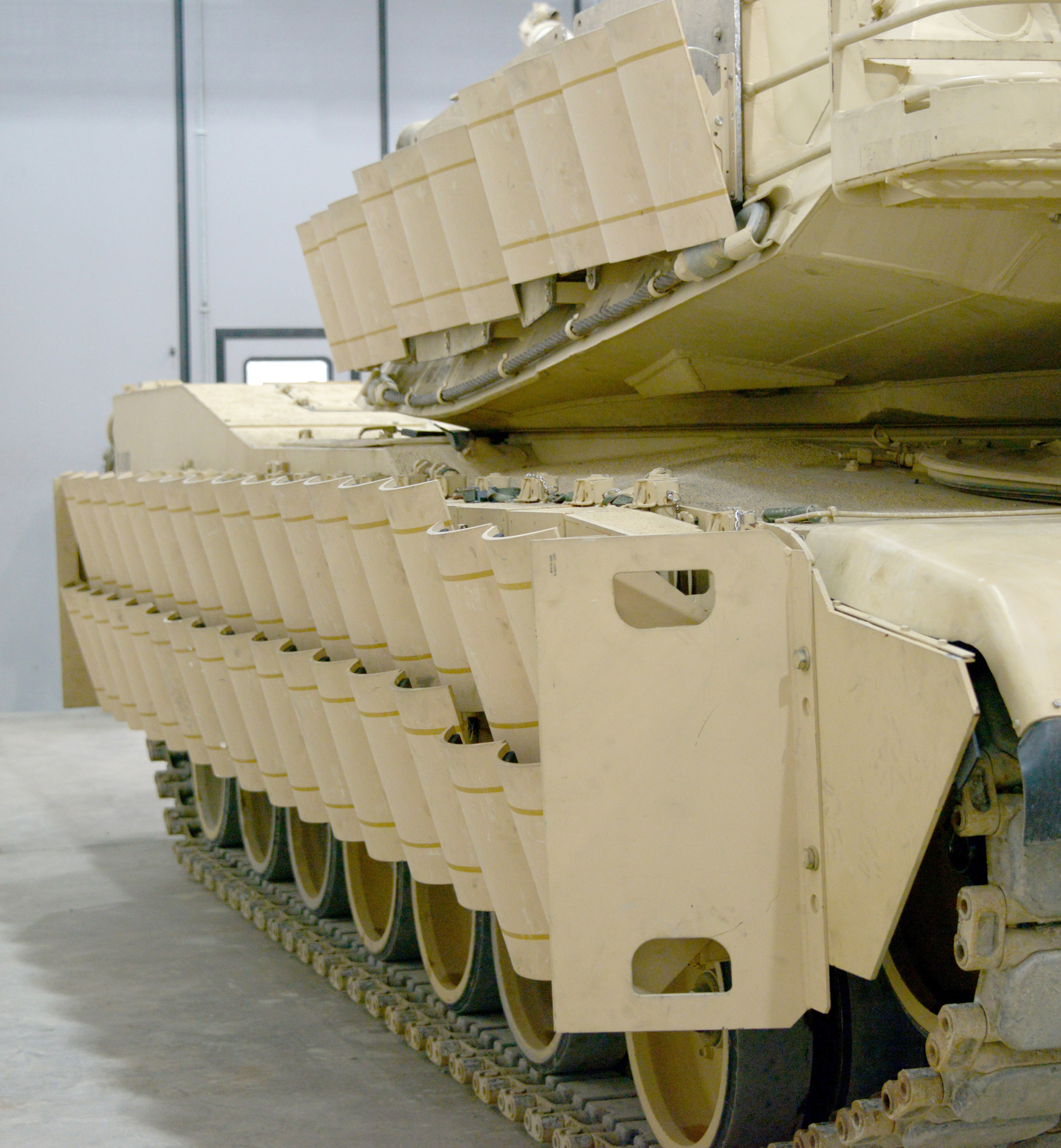
An American M1 Abrams with Abrams Reactive Armor Tiles, ARAT 2, installed along the sides of the hull and turret. This is typically not installed as a standard configuration and rather as part of the TUSK configureation.

The Soviets began the introduction of Kontak-1 ERA in the early 1980s, first being employed on the T-64BV with the "V" suffix standing for vzryvnoy, Russian for "explosive" indicating the tank has been upgraded with ERA protection compared to the T-64B. While initially adopted at a relatively slow pace successive generations of Soviet and Russian MBTs incorporated ERA as part of their standard armor protection, dropping the V suffix for newer model tanks for which the ERA is standard, not an upgraded add-on. By the late 1980s it was estimated that thousands of Soviet tanks, including T-72s and T-80s stationed in Eastern Europe had been equipped with ERA Modern Russian tanks are often characterised by their newer generation second generation Kontakt-5 and third generation Relikt ERA arrays and feature them all along the side of the side of the hull, the upper and lower glacis and roof of their most modern T-72 and T-90 MBTs

Western tanks have also been known to be fitted with ERA, however it is less ubiquitous as it has been on Soviet MBTs and remains on Russian MBTs, tending to be used in mission-dependent scenarios. For example, the American M1A2 Abrams can be equipped with Abrams Reactive Armor Tiles, ARAT. Designed for use in urban settings as part of the wider Tank Urban Survival Kit, TUSK, ARAT can also be installed alone. Introduced in 2006, this ERA designated as M19 ARAT 1, has been augmented with the M32 ARAT 2 system, which sees ARAT 2 tiles installed over the ARAT 1, partially overcoming the single use nature of ERA systems. Similarly, the British Challenger 2 can be outfitted with the Theatre Entry Standard, TEST, kit which sees ERA installed.

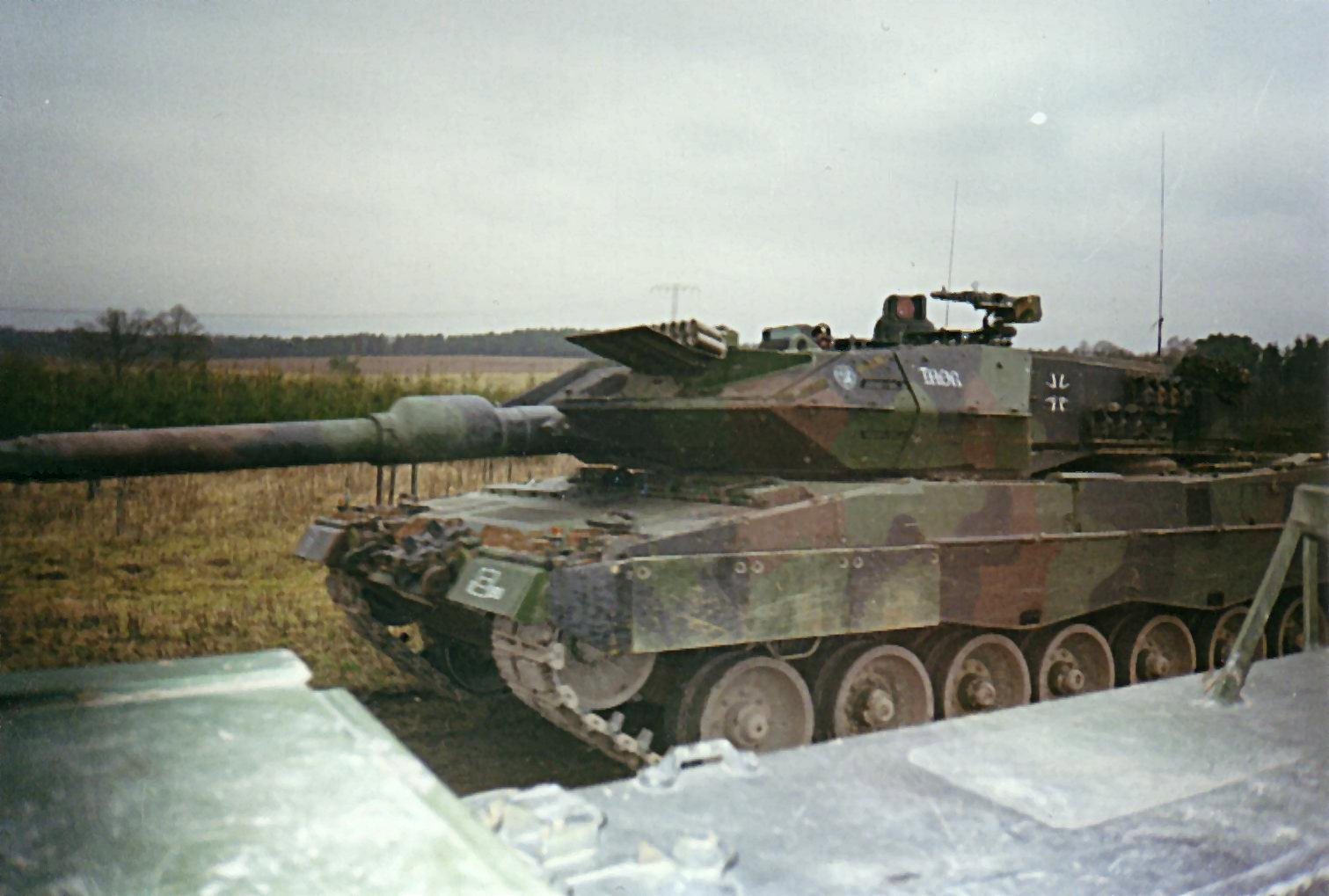
The Leopard 2 has incorporated NERA elements in both the turret and hull since its introduction in 1979, with this Leopard 2A5 having a modular frontal turret wedge module that has been installed on all subsequent variants since also having NERA-like properties.

Non-Explosive Reactive Armor, NERA, is another type of reactive composite armor that uses layers of metal separated by an inert, deformable material such as rubber which reacts to the impact of an incoming projectile, causing the metal plates to bulge and disrupt the penetration of the armor, however with less efficacy than ERA, but their non-consumable nature means NERA can provide multi-hit protection capability that ERA can not. The German Leopard 2 has been equipped with NERA armor since its introduction in 1979 and the arrowhead composite armor modules installed on Leopard 2A5 and beyond are considered to incorporate NERA-like properties of multiple layers of steel separated by inert materials to disrupt incoming munitions. The composite NERA system employed on the T-72B turret meant the armor of the MBT was deemed to provide a protection equal to that of NATO tanks.

Beginning in the late 1980s, MBTs began being equipped with modular armor, which consists of separate sections of armored modules that could be added and attached to an MBT and removed and replaced when damaged. This provides significant benefits over relying solely on the base armor of an MBT which could be difficult and costly to repair, replace or upgrade at a later time. The Israeli Merkava Mk-3 was the first to introduce this modular approach in 1989, where the armor consisting of ceramic composite materials is mounted to dedicated mounting points on the MBT to afford it better protection. One of the key advantages of modular armor is the ability to swap out armored modules and adapt the armor of the tank to mission-specific protection levels, as well as enabling upgrading armor of an MBT at a later date without needing to fully redesign it, as well as upgrading the protection of older generations of MBTs by affixing newer, more capable armored modules onto them.

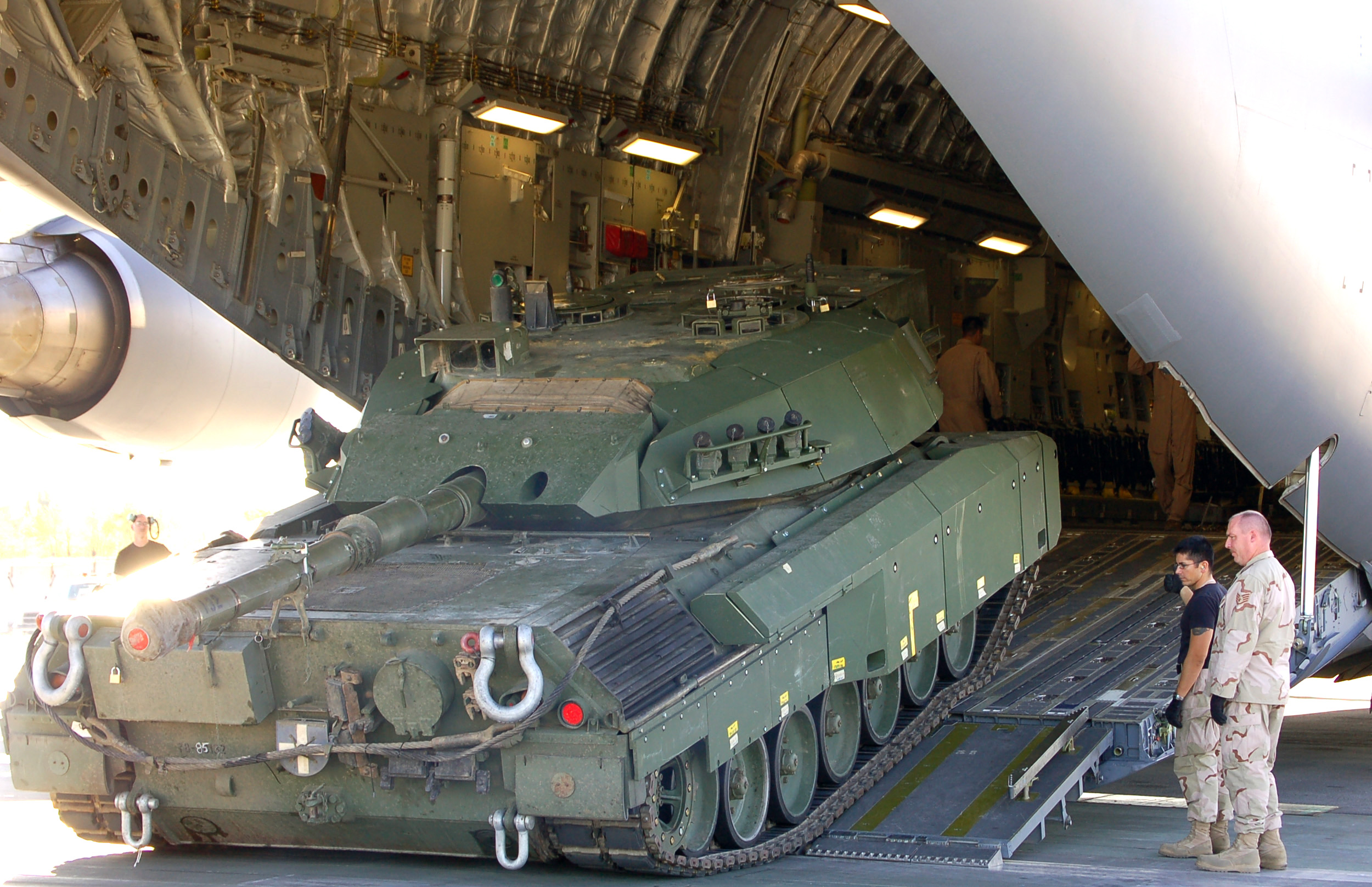
A Canadian Leopard C2, a derivative of the Leopard 1 MBT, equipped with MEXAS composite modular armor. This demonstrates how older generation MBTs can see their protection levels upgraded without needing to fully redesign the tank.

Modular composite armor such as the Modular Expandable Armor System, MEXAS, first introduced in 1994, has been applied to MBTs such as the Canadian Leopard C2 and Greek Leopard 2 HEL, with the follow up system the Advanced Modular Armor Protection, AMAP, also being applied to western MBTs such as the turret of the Polish Leopard 2PL. The newest British Challenger 3 MBT also features modular armor, and the latest variant of the Leopard 2, the 2A8, can also be equipped with all-around protection in the form of modular armor.

Missiles are cheap and cost-effective anti-tank weapons. ERA can be quickly added to vehicles to increase their survivability. However, the detonation of ERA blocks creates a hazard to any supporting infantry near the tank. Despite this drawback, it is still employed on many Russian MBTs, the latest generation Kontakt-5 being capable of defeating both high-explosive anti-tank (HEAT) and kinetic energy penetrator threats. The Soviets also developed Active Protection Systems (APS) designed to more actively neutralize hostile projectiles before they could even strike the tank, namely the Shtora and Arena systems. The United States has also adopted similar technologies in the form of the Missile Countermeasure Device and as part of the Tank Urban Survival Kit used on M1 Abrams tanks serving in Iraq. The latest Russian MBT, the T-14 Armata, incorporates an AESA radar as part of its Afghanit APS and in conjunction with the rest of its armament, can also intercept aircraft and missiles.

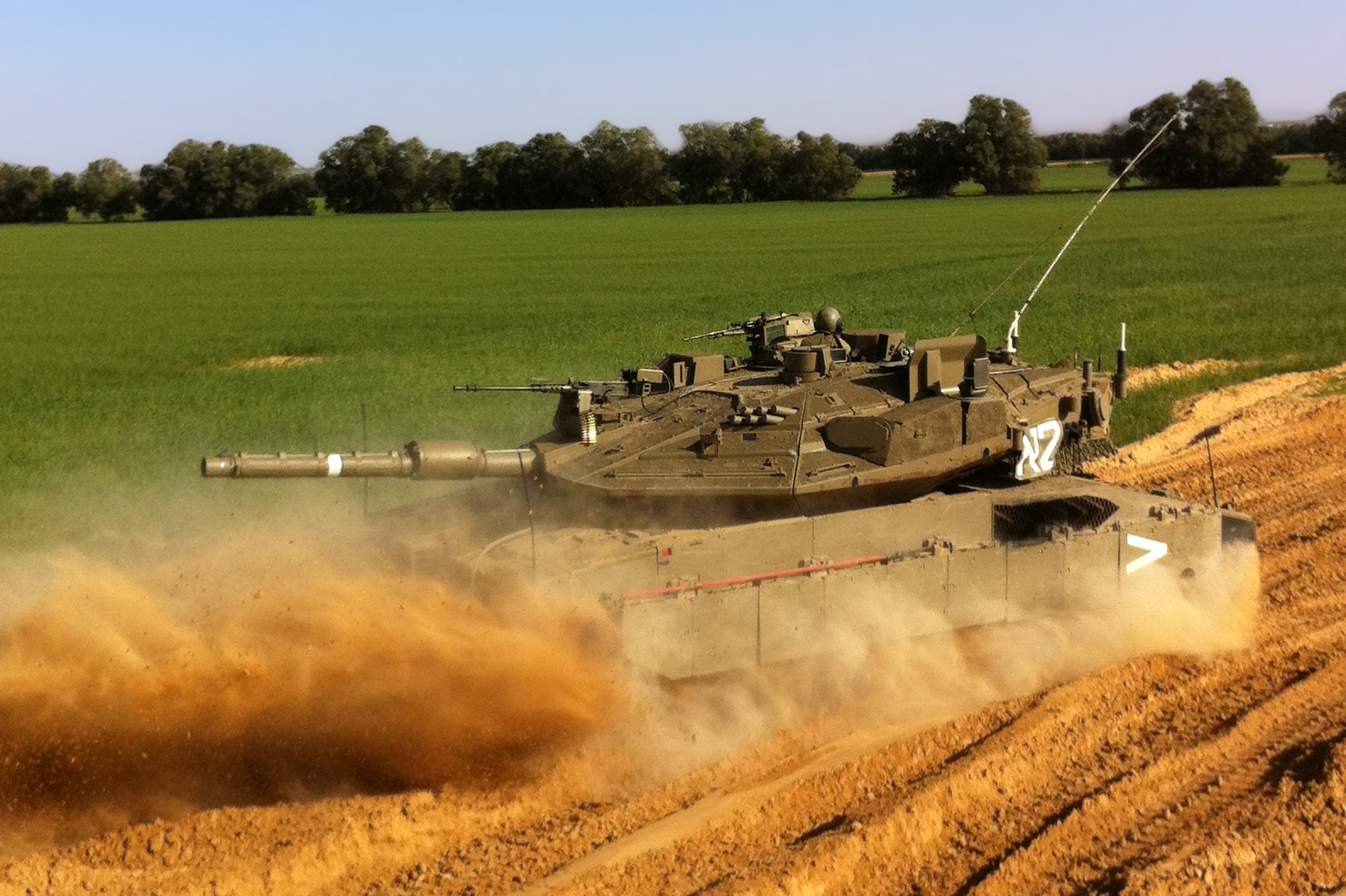
IDF Merkava Mk. IVm tank pictured on the Gaza border. It has the Trophy Active Protection System installed, which has become operational in the IDF since 2011 to deal with missile threats.

MBTs can also be protected from radar detection by incorporating stealth technology. The T-14 Armata has a turret designed to be harder to detect with radars and thermal sights. Advanced camouflage, like the Russian Nakidka, will also reduce the radar and thermal signatures of a MBT.

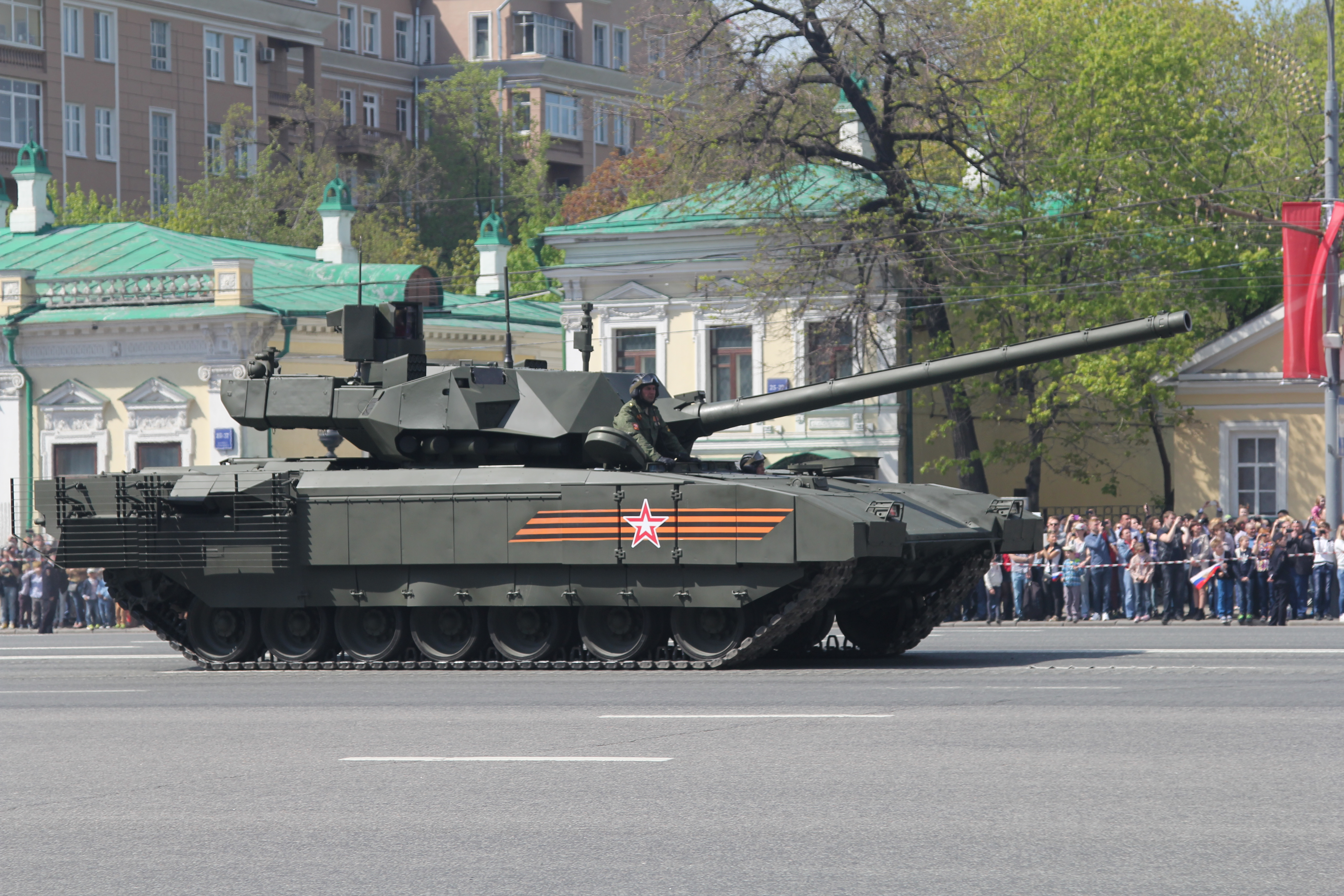
The Russian T-14 Armata has a three-tier protection system, with the Afghanit APS, the Malachit ERA, and composite armour.

Other defensive developments focused on improving the strength of the armour itself; one of the notable advancements coming from the British with the development of Chobham armour in the 1970s. It was first employed on the American M1 Abrams and later the British Challenger 1. Chobham armour uses a lattice of composite and ceramic materials along with metal alloys to defeat incoming threats, and proved highly effective in the conflicts in Iraq in the early 1990s and 2000s; surviving numerous impacts from 1950s, 1960s, and 1970s era rocket-propelled grenades with negligible damage. It is much less efficient against later models of RPGs. For example, the RPG-29 from the 1980s is able to penetrate the frontal hull armour of the Challenger 2.

=== Weaponry and Ammunition ===
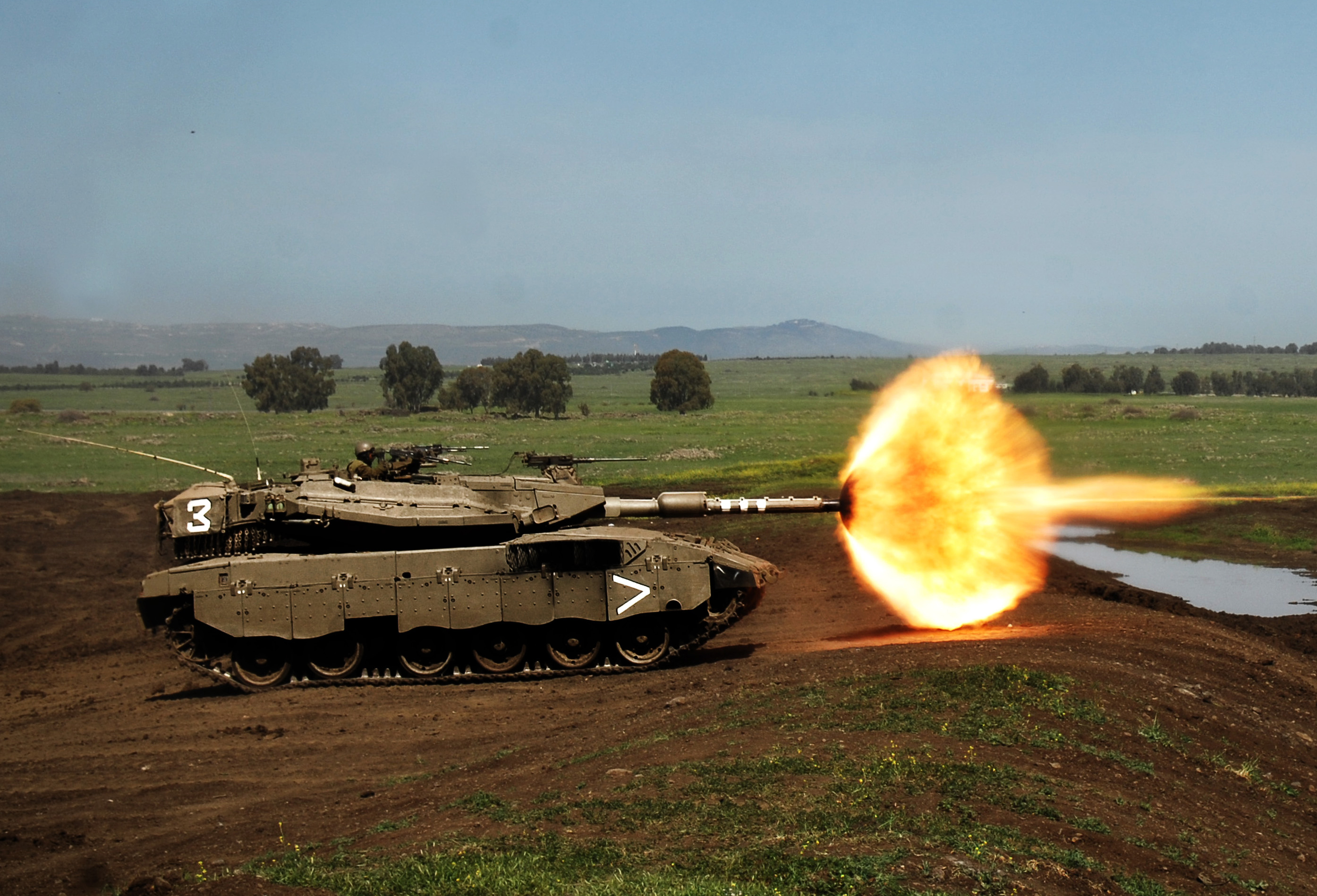
Merkava Mk 3d BAZ of the Israel Defense Forces firing its main gun

Almost all modern main battle tanks are equipped with a main gun, also known as the cannon, which serves as the MBTs main weapon, and a coaxial machine gun, also known as the 'coax' which serves as a secondary weapon both controlled and aimed using the tank's fire-control system.

The main cannon serves as the primary armament of a main battle tank and is what makes the tank an effective weapons platform against enemy vehicles, buildings, bunkers, hard cover and allows for long range firing on such targets from several kilometers away. The cannon also gives main battle tanks a great deal of variety in the ammunition they can fire depending on the task at hand, providing fire support capabilities that other armoured fighting vehicles are unable to replicate and enhances the versatility of the MBT. These ammunition types include Armor Piercing, HEAT, HESH, High Explosive, Multi-Purpose, canister, smoke and training rounds, as well as Anti-Tank Guided Missiles.

Since WWII and throughout the Cold War, main battle tanks have seen a marked increase in the calibre of their cannons. Soviet main guns were armed with 85-mm cannons during WWII, with the first Soviet Main battle tank, the T-62, featuring a 115-mm gun, and the T-64 being the first Soviet tank to feature a 125-mm cannon which remained the calibre used in all subsequent Soviet, and now modern Russian MBTs, including the first Russian tank designed since the fall of the USSR, the T-14 Armata. Western tanks also have seen similar large increases in their calibre, with the first British MBT, the Centurion, featuring the 105mm L7 cannon, with its successor, the Chieftain moving to a 120mm L11A5 cannon, with this caliber being used on all subsequent British tanks including the Challenger 1, Challenger 2, and the latest Challenger 3, although the cannon itself changed on the Challenger 2 to the L30A1 and again for the Challenger 3 to the German designed Rh-120, designated L55A1 in British service. The first American MBT, the M48 Patton, was initially equipped with a 90mm cannon, but later models were retrofitted with to a 105mm L7 derivative in 1975. This same caliber was used on the M60 in the form of the M68 tank gun which was also fitted to the original M1 Abrams before being upgraded to the 120mm M256 in 1984 and remains used on the latest variants.

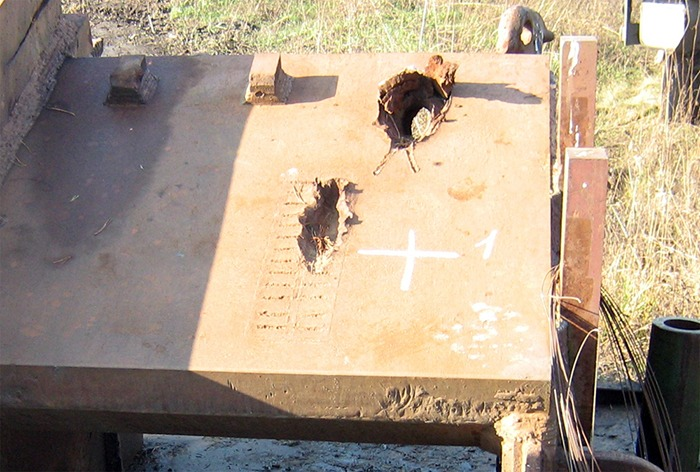
APDS and APFSDS are both methods of using a kinetic energy penetrator dart to pierce the armour of a target. This frontal plate of a tank shows a hole where an APFSD round penetrated and passed into where the crew compartment would be.

Another trend in MBT main cannons throughout the Cold War was the shift from rifled, to smoothbore cannons. The Soviet Union's first MBT was fitted with the first smoothbore weapon for tanks, the U-5TS, and all subsequent Soviet and Russian tanks have retained the smoothbore design in various iterations of the 2A46 series. Western main battle tank designers first experimented with a smoothbore cannons in the American-West German MBT-70. While the US Army initially wanted to equip the MBT-70 with a 152mm rifled cannon which would function as a gun and missile launcher, German designers advocated using a 120mm smoothbore cannon developed in parallel with the MBT, which eventually was used on the Leopard 2, replacing the 105mm rifled cannon on the outgoing Leopard 1, and the Americans adopted a derivative of the same smoothbore cannon on their M1 Abrams. British MBTs have been outliers in retaining the rifled cannon on their tanks, up to the Challenger 2, however even this has now changed and the latest Challenger 3 is to be equipped with a smoothbore cannon.

The primary reason for moving from rifled to smoothbore is due to the advent of Armor-Piercing Fin-Stabilised Discarding Sabot rounds, APFSDS.

Prior to the use of these rounds, main battle tanks used rifled cannons to spin the projectiles they fired in an effort to prevent tumbling and improve accuracy. These rounds, such as Armour-piercing Discarding Sabot, APDS, which were used to combat enemy armour, spun the sabot which in turn transferred the rotational force to the subcaliber armour piercing dart/rod penetrator contained within it, stabilising it in flight after the sabot discarded. This kinetic energy penetrator, made of a high density material such as depleted uranium, concentrates a high level of kinetic energy over a small surface area, enabling the dart to penetrate heavily armoured targets such as other MBTs, going straight through the armor and into the tank, causing high temperature metal fragments of the target's own armour to sheer off and spall inside the MBT creating deadly shrapnel that can maim or kill some or all of the crew, setting rounds and ammunition in the tank on fire or rupturing fuel tanks and lines. This phenomenon is known as beyond-armour effect, sometimes called behind-armour effects, creating destructive effects inside an armoured target as a result of it being penetrated by the projectile.

APFSDS round in action, showing the sabot being discarded from the projectile with stabilised fins on the rear. These rounds superseded APDS rounds, which function in the same manner but spun their sabot rather than using integrated fins, as the main way MBTs destroy enemy tanks and heavily armoured targets.

With APFSDS rounds, the dart penetrator has stabilising fins integrated into the dart penetrator, keeping it stable in flight and negating the need to spin for stabilisation. By removing the rifling, the pressure in the barrel can be increased, friction from the removal of the rifling grooves removed, which works to increase both the velocity of the rounds fired and the life of the barrel, leading to main battle tanks increasing their range and penetration capabilities and reducing barrel wear. While APDS rounds typically had an effective range of between 1.5 to 2 kilometers APFSDS rounds can be effective up to 4 kilometers. It was also discovered that HEAT rounds fired from MBTs benefited from removing the rifling, providing higher penetration if they do not rotate and spin in flight. APFSDS rounds have since superseded APDS rounds since the removed spin allows for a longer penetrator dart to be encased in the sabot, meaning it can fly further and at higher velocity, improving kinetic energy efficacy in penetrating heavily armoured targets and are now the primary way MBTs destroy these targets, however the basic principle of creating beyond-armour effects through penetrating the target remains the same as with APDS rounds. While tanks with rifled barrels can also fire APFSDS rounds, the act of transferring some of the energy from forward kinetic energy into unnecessary rotational energy decreases the efficacy of the round in penetrating armoured targets.

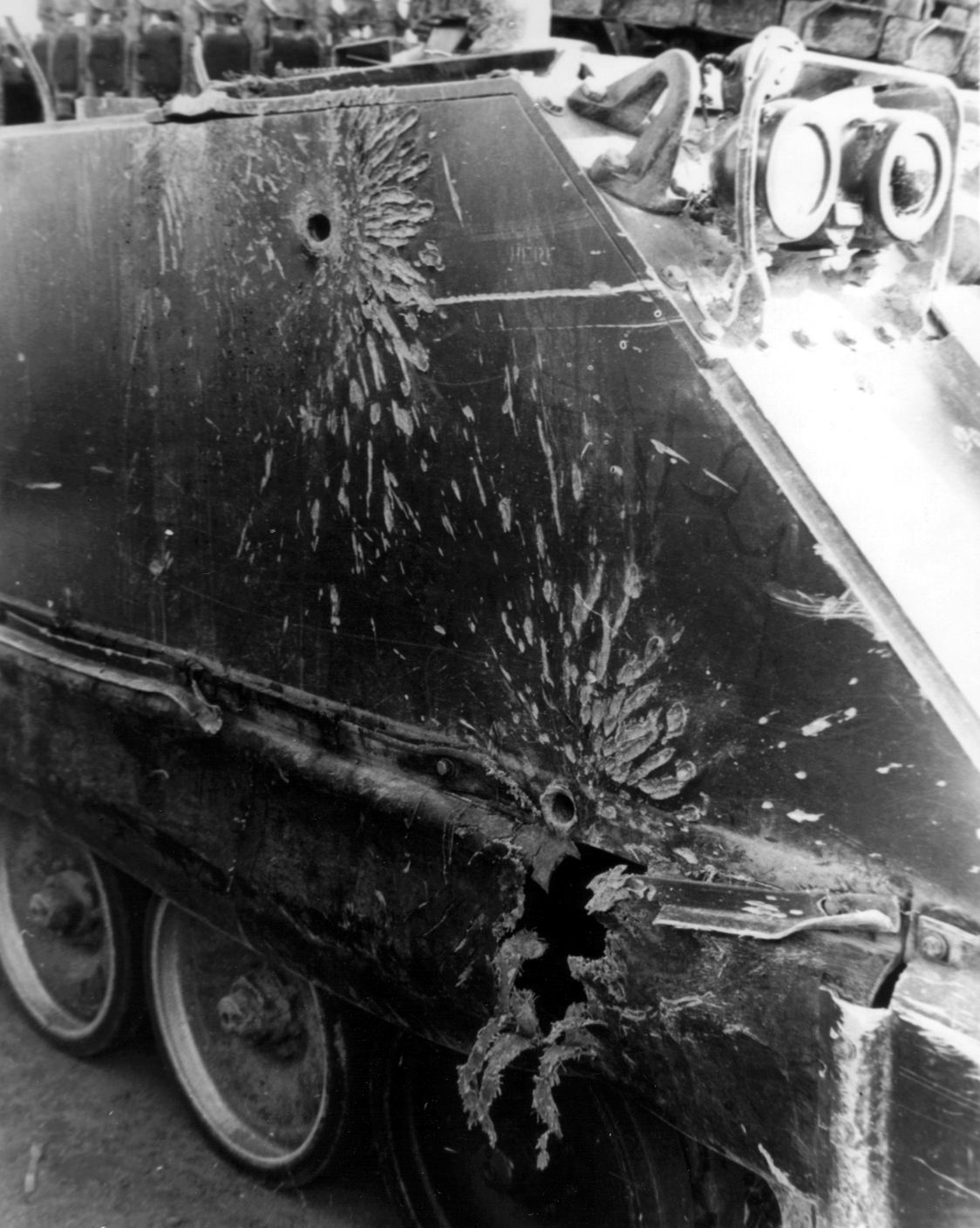
HEAT rounds can be effective at destroying more lightly armoured targets, such as this M113 Armoured Personnel Carrier sustaining damage after being shot by a HEAT round.

High Explosive Anti Tank, HEAT, is another anti-armour round used to destroy enemy vehicles, however these are usually ones that do not have as much armour as a MBT, being more lightly armored such as Armoured Personnel Carriers, Infantry Fighting Vehicles and Infantry Mobility Vehicles. HEAT rounds were initially favoured as the primary means of destroying enemy armoured targets by the United States and France up until the introduction of APFSDS ammunition in the 1970s. These rounds remain used however as they are also effective against fortified positions and infantry targets. HEAT rounds use a shaped charge warhead, which converts the chemical energy released by the round exploding the into kinetic energy of a high-velocity metallic jet. When the round detonates, the explosive collapsed a metal liner inward, forming the jet. The leading portion of the jet penetrates the armour of the target, producing fragments and spall inside the target, creating behind-armour effects. Because HEAT rounds do not discard any of their outer jacket, instead carrying the full round and explosive charge to the target, they are far heavier than APDS/APFSDS rounds, weighing approximately 20lbs, more and therefore fly in more of an arc compared to the straight line of the APDS/APFSDS dart penetrator, meaning they cannot be fired as far before accuracy dramatically diminishes, typically up to 1.5 kilometers. While useful against armoured targets, modern MBTs have developed several protective measures against HEAT rounds, most notably explosive reactive armour, ERA, and composite armour construction.

High Explosive, HE, rounds contain several kilograms of explosives, and can sometimes be produced and classified into specific types of HE depending on the round, such as fragmentation, designated as HE-FRAG, or for obstacle reduction, designated as HE-OR. These are fin stabilised rounds providing a slow rate of spin when in flight and are primarily used as general-purpose rounds for use against a variety of targets such as infantry, light skinned vehicles, fortifications, emplaced weapons stations and buildings or as a breach against them. While being relatively ineffective at destroying heavily armoured targets, HE and HE-FRAG rounds can see some success in damaging such targets and producing mobility kills or disabling the armaments or optics of such targets. Some more modern HE-FRAG rounds feature a remote detonator, allowing the round to explode in midair, making it especially effective against infantry targets behind cover, in trenches or spread out in open terrain.

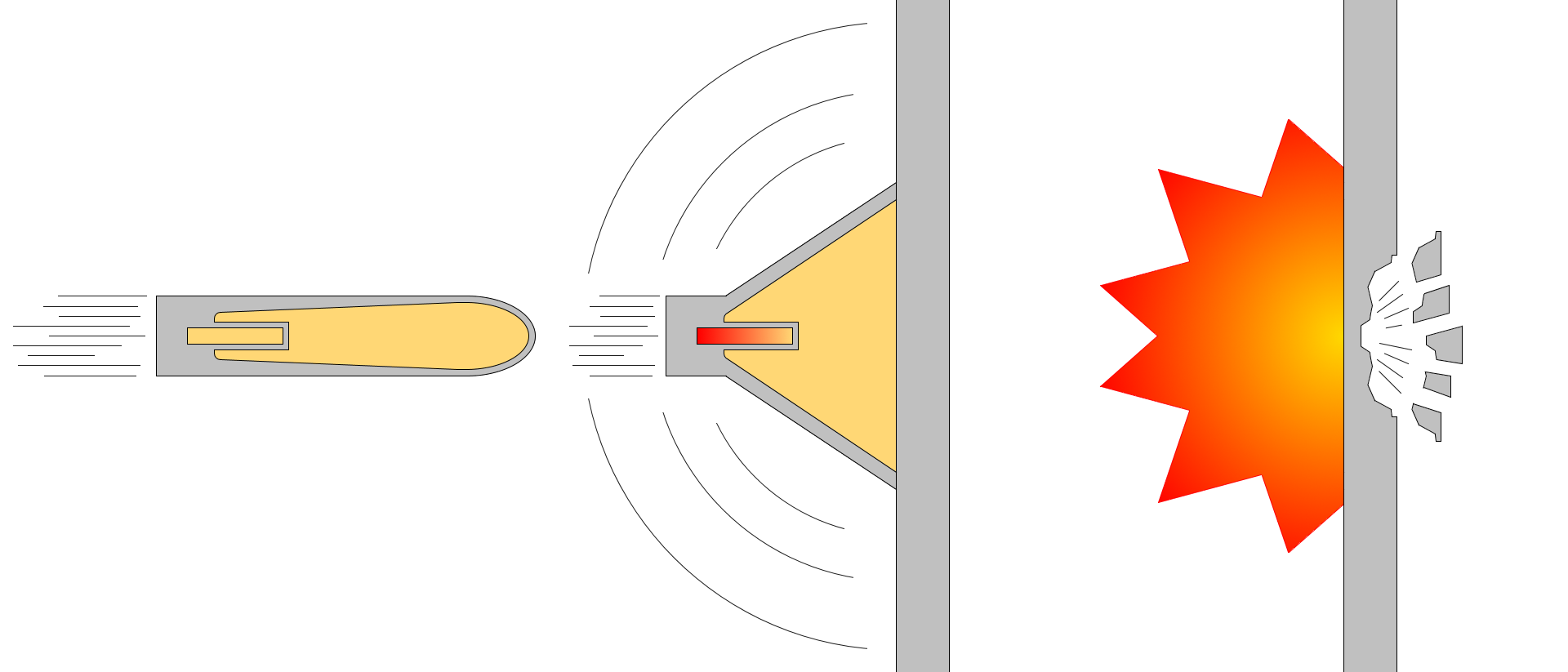
HESH rounds do not penetrate and create a hole in the armour of their target, rather creating shockwaves that break off interior fragments of the vehicle armour

High Explosive Squash Head, HESH, rounds are unique type of anti-armour rounds which seek not to penetrate the armour directly, as is the case with APDS/APFSDS rounds using kinetic energy, but rather detonating on the armour "squashing" the head of the round against it forming a large flat disc-shaped plastic explosive charge pressed onto the outer layer of armour which subsequently explodes when the rear of the round containing the fuse makes contact with it. This explosion generates shockwaves throughout the armour of the target, passing through the armor until reaching the opposite side on the interior of the vehicle. Because the shockwave cannot transmit any further through the armor, it reverses and travels back through to the outer layer of the armor. This causes the inner surface of the armor to flake off, creating spall that is projected into the crew compartment, creating beyond-armour effects without directly penetrating the armour. HESH rounds are spun in order to ensure a predictable and optimal distribution of the explosive plastic filler makes contact with the outer armor of the target. Up until the development of the Challenger 3, the British Army wished to maintain the rifled barrels in their Challenger 2 tanks for this purpose of maintaining compatibility with HESH, however has since moved to adopt a smoothbore cannon and shifted doctrine to be more aligned with NATO partners who do not use HESH rounds and rifled tank barrels.

Canister rounds are a type of anti-personnel rounds designed for the defense of MBTs against large numbers of infantry, breaking up infantry formations at close range, typically up to a few hundred meters, as well as engaging light skinned vehicles and possessing anti-obstacle capabilities. Unlike HEAT and HESH rounds, the canister round has no fuse, rather acts more like a shotgun shell dispersing a conical barrage of hundreds of tungsten balls with the intention of maiming or killing infantry targets, enhancing the survivability of the MBT against infantry targets making the round as much of a defensive round as it is offensive.

Smoke rounds may also be fired by MBTs, however in reality this is something of a misnomer as they are officially white phosphorus rounds. These can be fired from the main gun to create a smokescreen that lasts for several seconds, which can be used to support infantry by providing a blanket of concealing smoke, far larger than what could be generated by hand held smoke grenades issued to infantry. These should not be confused with the smoke grenade launchers that are fitted to most MBTs as a means of defense, as smoke rounds are a round fired from the main cannon of the MBT at a specific target, rather than arrays of smaller smoke grenades launched from the vehicle at fixed points.

In 2025, Rheinmetall's 130 mm smoothbore cannon became the reference gun for multiple European MBT projects, including Leopard 3 and MGCS, reflecting a continental shift beyond NATO-standard 120 mm calibers.

Coaxial machine guns are mounted to the sides of the main cannon and provide additional lethality and versatility to the weaponry of the tank.

The coaxial machine gun serves to allow tank crews to engage soft targets for which the main cannon rounds would be wasteful or ineffective, as the main gun only carries a limited amount of ammunition and can only fire one round before needing to reload, whereas the coaxial machine gun can carry thousands of rounds and provide fully automatic fire. This allows the coaxial machine gun to be an effective weapon against infantry targets, suppressive fire, targets behind light cover, unarmored vehicles and equipment. This can be especially useful in a combined arms application, where the main battle tank, accompanied by friendly infantry forces, provides suppressive fire after making a breakthrough, with Soviet doctrine stating the main battle tanks provide a "curtain [of] fire" over the enemy, pinning them down and allowing infantry forces to advance, as well as useful in point defense of the tank against suspected target locations where continuous fire is needed or where firing the main cannon is not practical.

Historically, a coaxial machine gun mounted to main battle tanks could be used to assist gunners in ranging their targets. The British Centurion MBT was equipped with the dedicated L6A1 ranging gun, coaxially mounted and configured to fire tracer rounds in three round bursts to assist the gunner in ranging the main gun, making the coaxial machine gun a target acquisition tool rather than a secondary weapon, however the advent of modern laser range finding has meant that this use for the coaxial machine gun has been replaced.

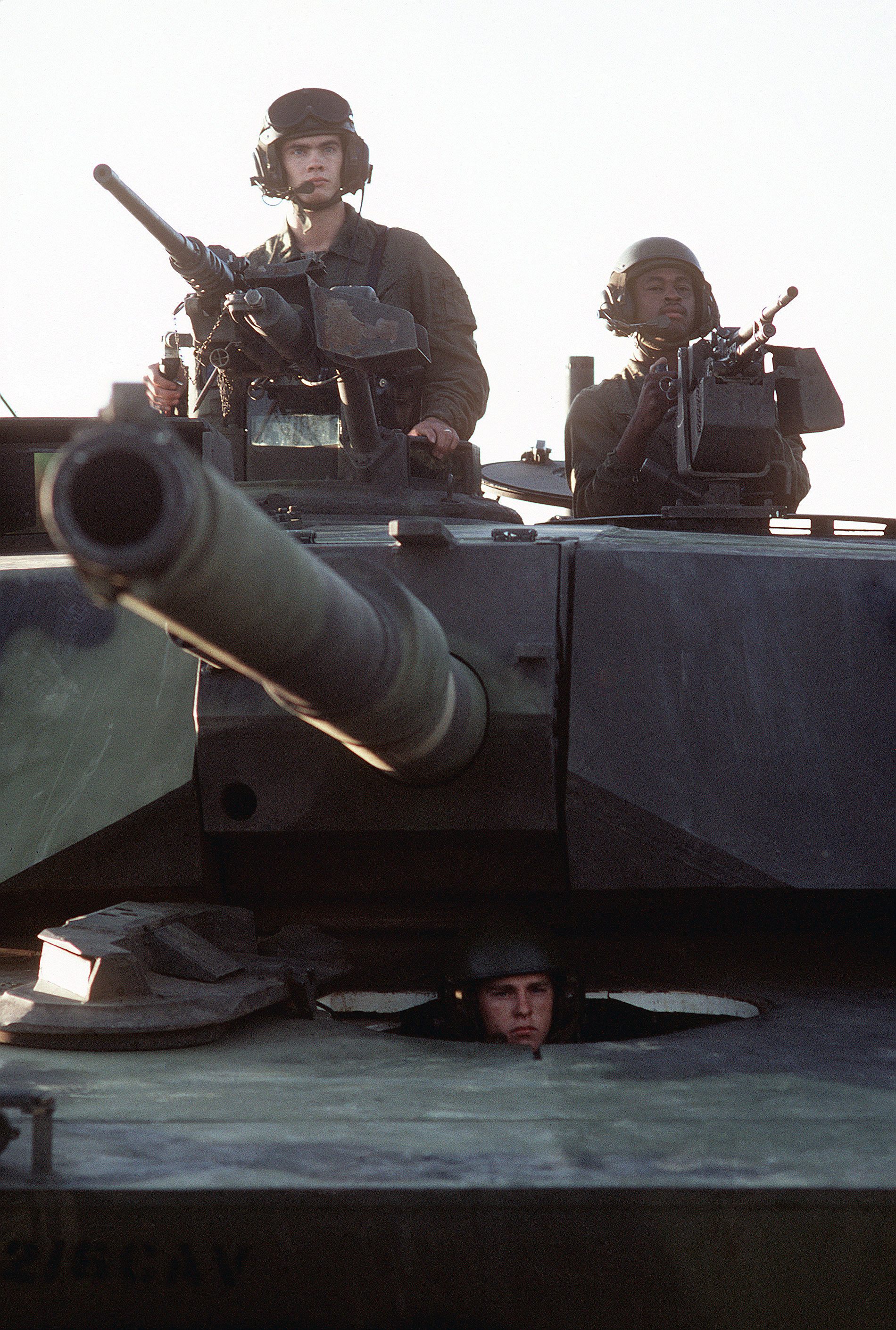
The American M1 Abrams displaying the main cannon, the coaxial machine gun, and both commander and loader weapon station.

Coaxial machineguns are usually variants of the same general purpose machine gun that are issued to infantry, but modified for use inside an armoured fighting vehicle. Barrels are thicker to allow for better cooling inside the vehicle and reduced need for barrel changes inside the tank where doing so may be more difficult. Buttstocks, bipods and iron sights are removed also to save space and because such features are redundant when configured for use as a coaxial machine gun. Barrel shrouds are removed as the gun is not held by the gunner during use. The coaxial makes use of a solenoid connected to the same firing controls as main cannon, meaning the gunner can use the same controller as the main gun and allowing them to toggle between the coax and cannon all on the same controller. The M240C for example is the coaxial machinegun of the US Army and installed in the Abrams tank and is derived from the M240 with the C denoting it is for deployment in vehicles has a charging cable rather than handle, a removed buttstock and thicker barrel. The Soviet/Russian PKT is derived from the PK machine gun adapted for use as a coaxial machine gun in a similar fashion.

Many main battle tanks will also feature a roof mounted machine gun which can move independently of the main turret, either in a fixed arc or a fill 360 degree range, allowing the tank to engage targets on the different directions from where the main cannon and coaxial machine gun are facing. This serves a dual purpose of engaging enemy aircraft due to the higher elevation these roof mounted systems allowed, as well as ground targets as well as suppressive fire and point defense. It is usually intended to be fired by the tank commander, but in some MBTs this weapons station is manned by the loader, who would emerge from their hatch to man the weapon and engage targets. The American M1 Abrams is noted as being a rare example of the gunner, commander and loader each having a weapons system with there being a coaxial machine gun and both commander and loader weapons station.

The idea of having an externally mounted machine gun to main battle tanks can be found as early as WWII, with American main battle tanks being noted in their design and appearance for their addition. However it was not until the early years of the Cold War did Soviet main battle tank designs begin to incorporate it as standard on their new T-54, with the only WWII Soviet tank to employ such a system being the IS-2 heavy tank, mounting a manually operated 12.7mm DShKM heavy machine gun to the commanders hatch. Modern developments of this roof mounted machine gun have seen it become a Remote Weapons Stations, or RWS, whereby the commander can remain inside the tank to fire the weapon without exposing themselves to hostile fire. This overcomes a significant drawback of these externally mounted systems in that being exposed to hostile fire can render the weapon mount useless, as Russian tank crews serving in Chechnya mentioned it was suicidal to attempt using their T-72s exposed machine gun in urban environments where it would be useful for engaging targets on high buildings. American designers also acknowledged this drawback of externally mounted weapons systems on the Abrams MBT, providing a Transparent Armor Gun Shield to the loader machine gun mount as part of its urban survivability package. RWS systems, such as the American CROWS are usually heavier caliber rounds than the coaxial machine gun, usually .50 caliber M2 browning compared to the 7.62mm coaxial, although some tanks may use the same caliber as the coaxial system or even be equipped instead with a 40mm grenade launcher, and have their own independent optics and fire control systems with thermal and night vision capabilities, allowing the tank commander independent viewing, which is useful for enhancing the situational awareness of the tank crew, even if the weapon is not fired.

The first Soviet MBT to be equipped with such a system was the T-64, equipped with the ZU-64A remote-controlled anti-aircraft weapons station, however T-72s, designed at the time to be more mass-produced, were not equipped with the remote system, retaining the manually operated systems, however more modern Soviet tanks such as the T-90 reinstated the remote station.

Even more recently, this RWS station has been proposed to be expanded to counter modern threats to tanks, such as counter-UAS capabilities, as well as potential for the RWS system to incorporate anti-tank weaponry.

=== Situational awareness ===
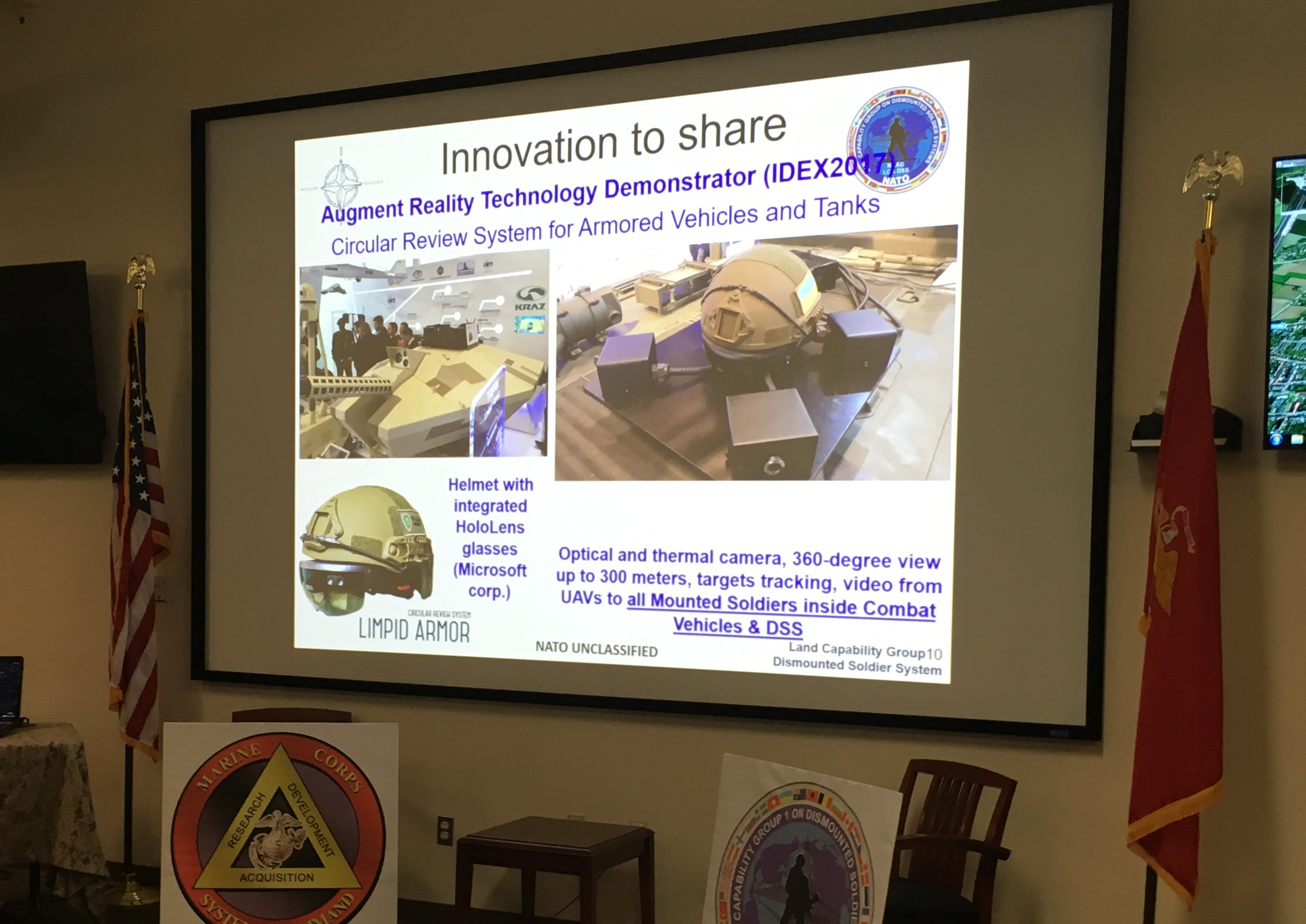
Circular review system of the company LimpidArmor

Performing situational awareness and communicating is one of four primary MBT functions. For situational awareness, the crew can use a circular review system combining augmented reality and artificial Intelligence technologies. These systems use several externally mounted video sensors to transfer a 360º view of the tank's surroundings onto crew helmet-mounted displays or other display systems.

=== Mobility ===
MBTs, like previous models of tanks, move on continuous tracks, which provide adequate mobility over most terrain, including sand and mud. They also enable tanks to climb over most obstacles. MBTs can be made water-tight, so they can even dive into shallow water (5 m (16 ft) with snorkel). However, tracks are not as fast as wheels; the maximum speed of a tank is about 65 km/h (40 mph). (Note: 72 km/h (45 mph) for the Leopard 2) The extreme weight of vehicles of this type 40–70 t (39–69 long tons; 44–77 short tons) also limits their speed. They are usually equipped with a 1,200–1,500 hp (890–1,120 kW) engine (more than 25,000 cc (1,526 cu in)), with an operational range near 500 km (310 mi).

The German Army has prioritized mobility in its Leopard 2 which is considered one of the fastest MBTs in existence. The Leopard 2A8 retains the MTU MB 873 Ka-501 engine delivering 1,500 horsepower, paired with enhanced suspension for higher endurance over rough terrain. Ergonomic redesigns, improved climate control, and NBC protection further enhance crew performance in extended combat scenarios.

The MBT is often cumbersome in traffic and frequently obstructs the normal flow of traffic. The tracks can damage some roads after repeated use. Many structures like bridges do not have the load capacity to support an MBT. In the fast pace of combat, it is often impossible to test the sturdiness of these structures. Though appreciated for its excellent off-road characteristics, the MBT can become immobilized in muddy conditions.

The high cost of MBTs can be attributed in part to the high-performance engine-transmission system and to the fire control system. Also, propulsion systems are not produced in high enough quantities to take advantage of economies of scale.

Crew fatigue limits the operational range of MBTs in combat. Reducing the crew to three and relocating all crewmembers from the turret to the hull could provide time to sleep for one off-shift crewmember located in the rear of the hull. In this scenario, crewmembers would rotate shifts regularly and all would require cross-training on all vehicle job functions. Cargo aircraft are instrumental to the timely deployment of MBTs. The absence of sufficient numbers of strategic airlift assets can limit the rate of MBT deployments to the number of aircraft available.

Military planners anticipate that the airlift capability for MBTs will not improve in the future. To date, no helicopter has the capability to lift MBTs. Rail and road are heavily used to move MBTs nearer to the battle, ready to fight in prime condition. Where well maintained roads allow it, wheeled tank transporters can be used.

The task of resupply is usually accomplished with large trucks.

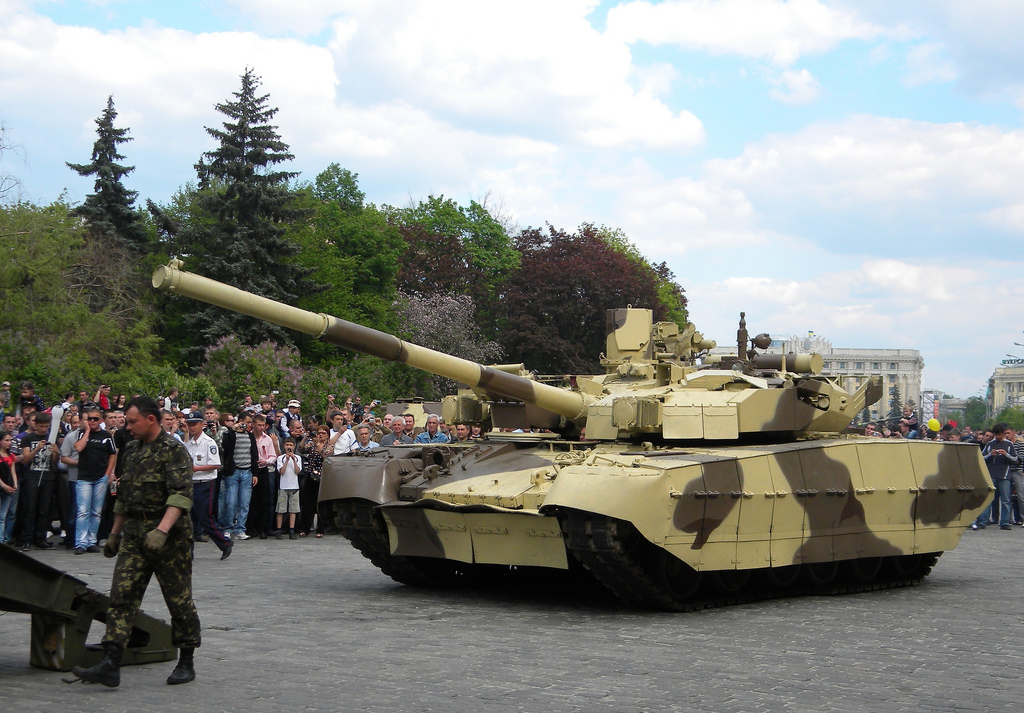
Ukrainian BM Oplot, produced by the KMDB guided onto a tank transporter

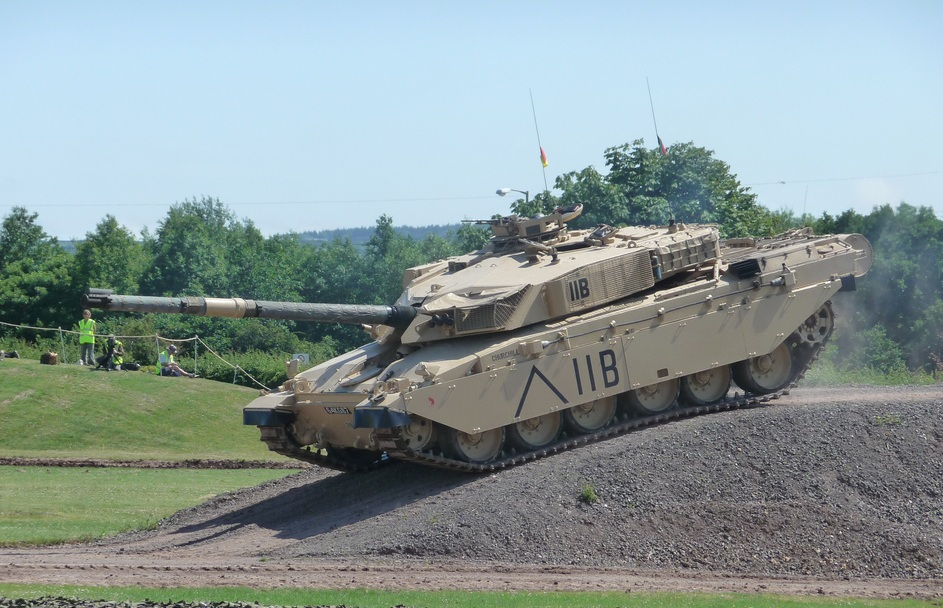
A former British Army Challenger 1

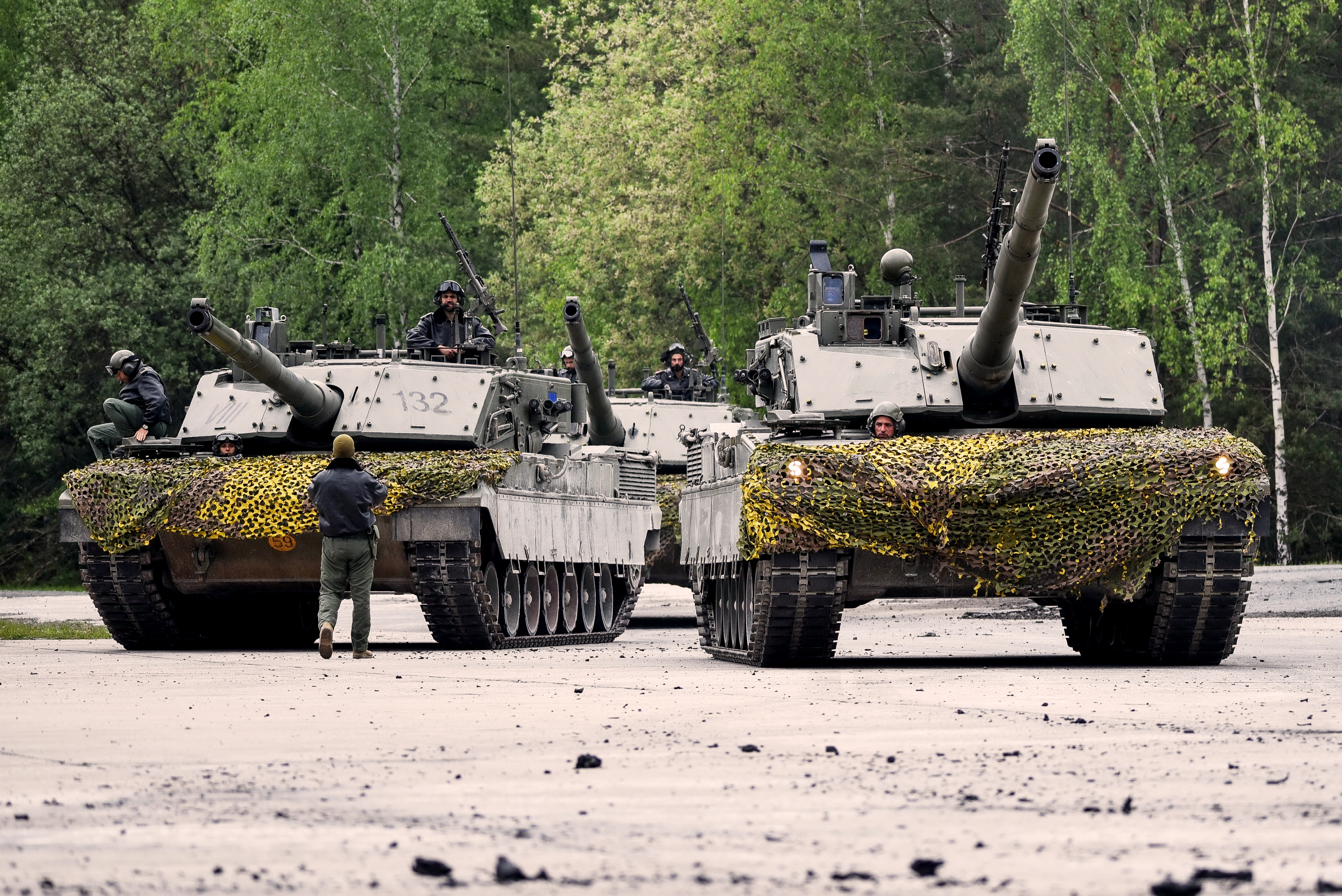
The Italian Ariete. Its relatively low weight (54 tonnes) facilitates mobility, especially while crossing bridges.

The Indian Arjun MK1A demonstrating movement over bump track

=== Storage ===
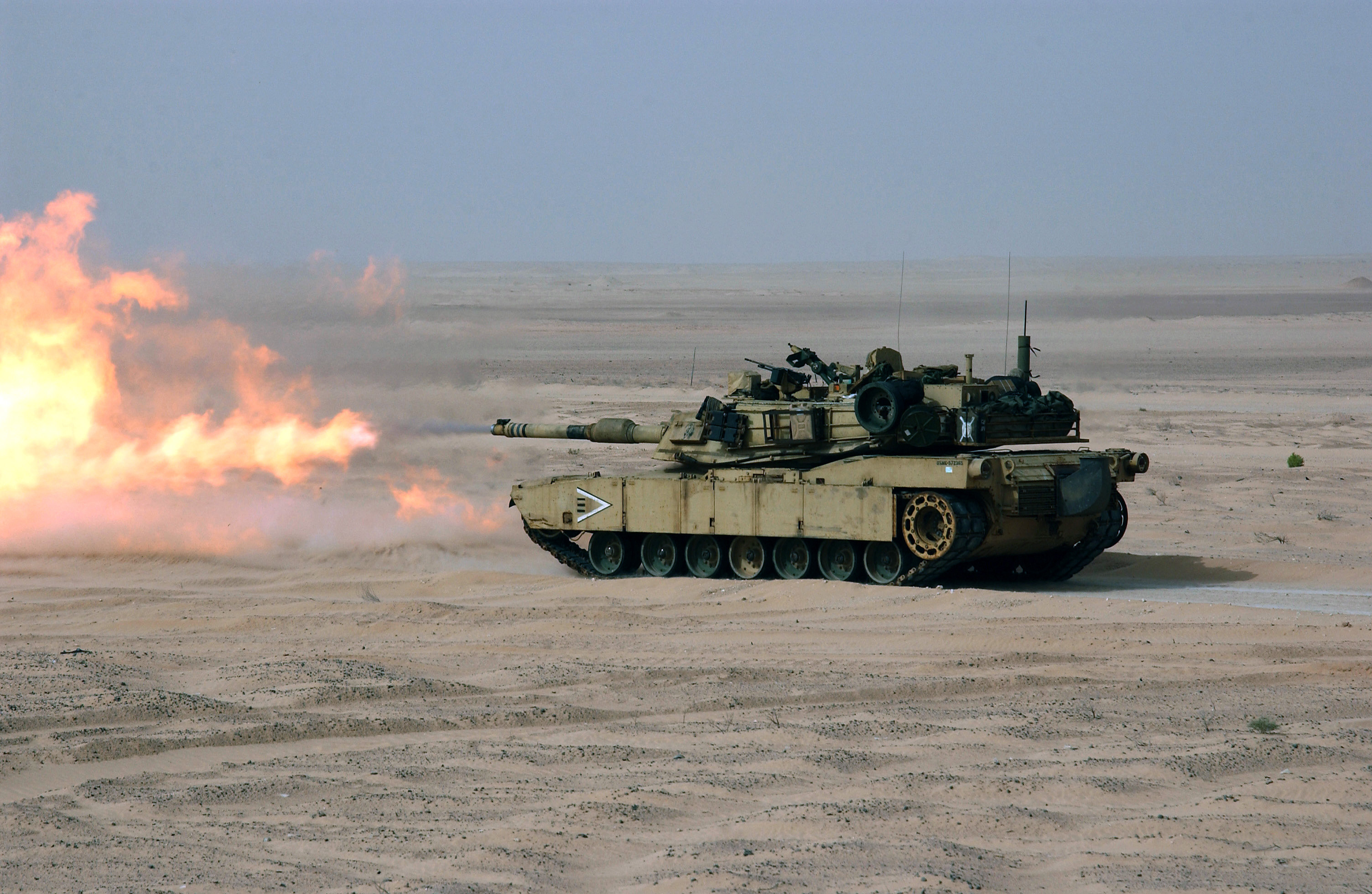
M1 Abrams shown with spare road wheel, track links, jerry cans and backpacks mounted onto the external storage racks and bustle rack

Main battle tanks have internal and external storage space. Internal space is reserved for ammunition. External space enhances independence of logistics and can accommodate extra fuel and some personal equipment of the crew.

Many main battle tanks have a bustle, an extension on the rear of the tank turret usually used for storage of ammunition, often with blow-out panels and separated from the rest of the crew compartment, that serve to protect the tank from being totally destroyed in the event the ammunition is hit, which has become known as the Jack-in-the-box-effect.

Attached to this bustle extension may be an externally mounted bustle rack, where tank crews can store gear and supplies that would be useful when out in the field on operation or exercise, but not essential for operation of the tank and subsequently not needed inside it.

The Israeli Merkava can accommodate crew members displaced from a destroyed vehicle in its ammunition compartment.

== Crew, training and equipment ==
Emphasis is placed on selecting and training main battle tank crew members. The crew must perform their tasks faultlessly and harmoniously so commanders select teams taking into consideration personalities and talents.

Modern tank crewmen undergo specialist training in operating their MBT, dependent on the role they are expected to perform in the tank.

Main battle tank crewmen, or as they are often called, tankers, first pass through basic training before moving on to training for their specialty role as a tank crewman, which is a practice that mirrors how WWII era tankers were trained, albeit in a shorter timeframe.

In NATO countries, specialist training is usually at dedicated institutions and establishments such as the American Army Armor School, British Royal Tank Training Regiment and the French Ecole de cavalerie de Saumur, usually along with crewmen of other Armoured Fighting Vehicles, where tankers become trained on their MBT and armoured warfare doctrine and unit tactics, dismounted skills, maintenance and repair of their tank through theoretical classes and exercises. Such schools will be equipped with the MBTs used by that nation for training the crewmen, however these may be older variants of the tank than they will eventually serve on, retained in service for this very purpose, with the German Schule gepanzerte Kampftruppen using older Leopard 2A5 variants of the German Leopard 2 MBT when compared to the frontline Leopard 2A6 and A7 models.

Soviet, and now Russian, main battle tank crewmen are trained in a different manner, instead opting to train tankers in more regional levels throughout different armoured formations rather than a single location school-based model as is more common in NATO countries, often training directly with the unit they will eventually serve in, however tank commanders serving as commissioned officers do attend the dedicated Kazan Higher Tank Command School.

While their role as tank crewmen is a generic term, depending on their role in the tank, crewmen may be trained on their distinct duties they are expected to perform as part of their role. Some militaries train their tank crewmen to only be familiar and proficient in their specific role in the tank, while Western crewmen are trained specifically in with what duties, responsibilities and roles their fellow crewman carry out.

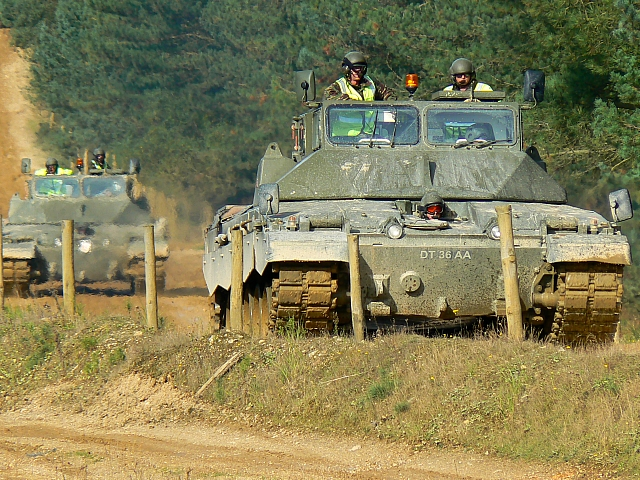
Crewmen training to become drivers may learn the handling and mechanics of their tank on a dedicated driver training variant, such as the Challenger 2 Driver Training Tank

Crewmen assuming the role of gunner for example will be trained and tested on the use of the tanks fire control systems and sighting either in a simulator or real world training tanks, making use of special inert training rounds when conducing live fire training and learning target tracking, acquisition and firing drills.

Specialist driver training variants of tanks exist developed for the purpose of familiarising the crewman assigned as the driver with the control of their tank, as is the case with British Challenger 1 and Challenger 2 and German Leopard 1 and Leopard 2 tanks. Such tanks may see their turret removed and replaced with a larger drivers cab to accommodate for drivers to be observed and receive instruction from trainers as well as to improve visibility with increased driver viewports and mirrors, while maintain the same hull weight and controls to allow trainee drivers to become familiar with the tank and its handling characteristics. Ballasts and mock barrels may also be installed to ensure the tank mimics the same weight and line of sight as its operational counterpart with turret installed.

World War II era main battle tanks had between four and five crew members. During World War II, American, British and German main battle tanks were designed to be crewed by a commander, gunner, driver, loader and a fifth crew member who, depending on the tank model, would usually serve a dual role such as assistant driver and bow gunner or co-loader and radio operator, while Soviet and Italian tanks were designed for a four person crew of commander, gunner, driver and loader.

Modern main battle tanks have been reduced to between three and four crew members where the fifth dual role member has been eliminated, and three person tank crews make use of an autoloader to eliminate the need for the loader role, such as in post World War II Soviet and modern day Russian tank designs, as well as the current French main battle tank, the Leclerc.

Most NATO member countries, and nations that use tanks designed by them, retain the loader crewmember and opt for a four person crew.

Tank crewmen during World War II began to be issued uniforms that differed from other soldiers, focusing on maneuverability and protection from injuries sustained within their tanks, as opposed to on the battlefield, something the uniforms of main battle tank crewmen also have historically been issued with.

Modern Main Battle Tank crewmen are often issued with specialist equipment, such as these Russian tankers issued with the 6B48 tank helmet. Visible under it is the Shlemofon hood with integrated earphone and microphone.

Crews tend to carry a more stripped down loadout when compared to infantry, focusing more on maneuverability and protection from noise and hazards from operating within the tank, rather than dangers faced by infantry on the battlefield and adapted for the restricted operating space even the largest main battle tanks afford. Tank crews may be issued body armor, however this was deemed to be ineffective at protecting crews from spall or shock injuries they may sustain while inside the tank and may instead be issued Spall vests, also known as "chicken vests" instead which are better suited for protection against these threats.

Soviet tankers could be identified by their distinctive TSh-4 tanker cap, known as the Shlemofon, iterations of which continue to be worn by modern Russian tank crewmen underneath modern hardshell helmets, as the padding it provided when operating in cramped environments of tanks protected crew from head injuries. German Panzer crews were issued black wool jackets designed to hide grease and oil stains that came from working with their tanks and American crews were issued a cropped jacket for better movement and the Model 1938 tanker helmet.

More modern tanker uniforms focus on fire retardant properties and helmets with integrated communications equipment and noise cancelling technology. Crews operating in especially hot climates such as Iraq and Afghanistan may be issued with cooling vests as part of their tanker uniform in order to better regulate the temperature of the crewmen operating in tanks as, even with air conditioning systems, they can get incredibly hot.

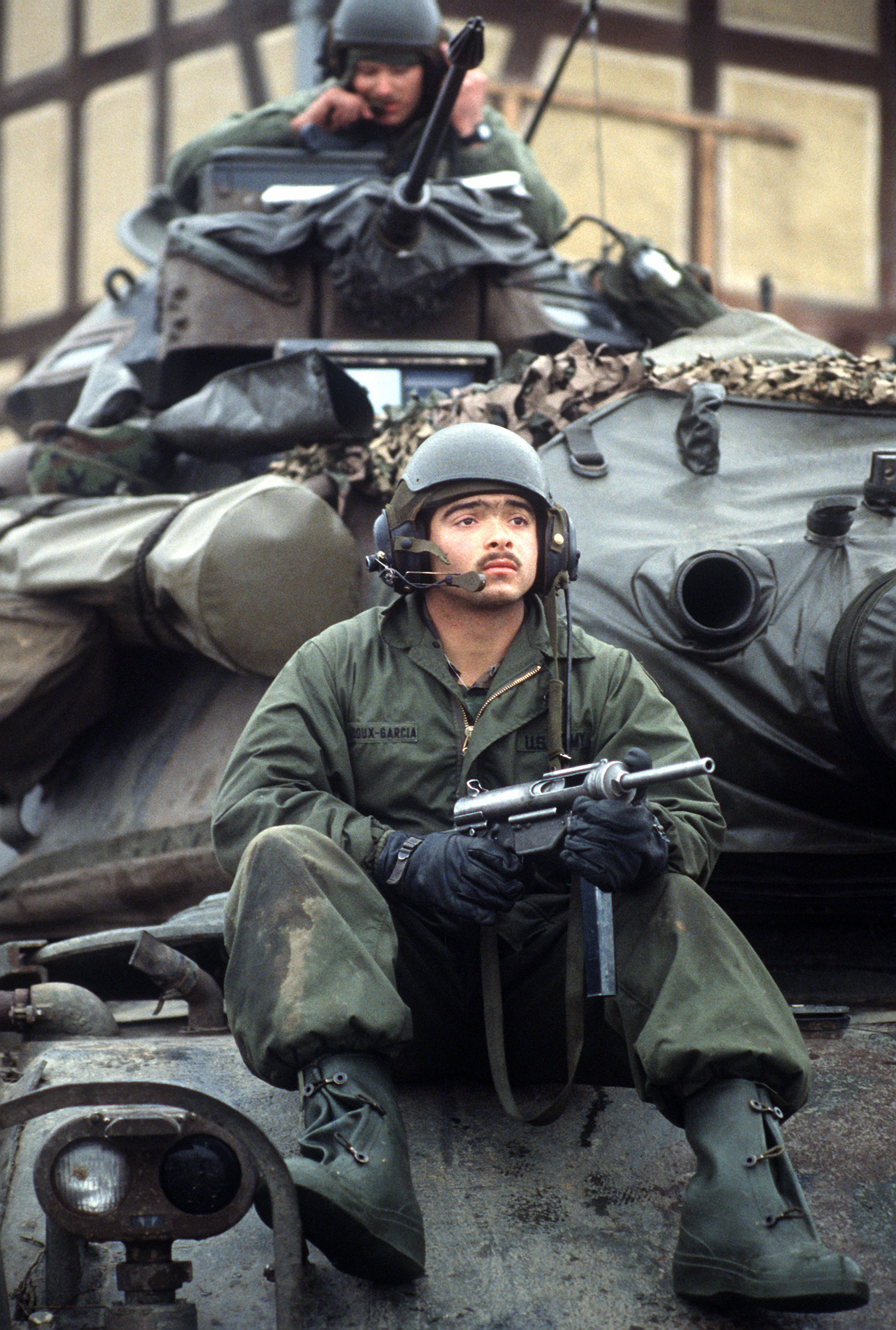
While MBT crews primary use the weapons of their tank, they are issued with small arms for out-of-tank activities, such as this American M60 crewman wielding his M3 Submachine gun.

Tank crews may also be issued with different footwear compared to infantry units. Tanker boots are worn by main battle tank crews which prioritise the needs specific to these crews when compared to standard military boots such as superior fire retardant properties, improved air circulation and strap rather than lace up design, preventing laces becoming loose in a cramped environment.

While main battle tank crews are not classed as infantry units and their primary weapon is the tank itself, they are still equipped with personal weapons for any out-of-vehicle operations that may arise such as conducting repairs, field maintenance, area security or abandoning a disabled tank. These weapons are usually different from the service weapons issued to infantry units in that they are usually pistols, personal defense weapons or carbines.

For example, the British L22A2 carbine is issued to Challenger 2 crewmen in place of the L85A2 and L85A3. During World War Two, American Sherman crews were initially issued the M1982 Thompson, later issued instead with the M3 Submachine gun which continued to be issued to M60 crews up to the Gulf War, early Abrams crews were issued the M1911 while modern Abrams crewmen are issued M9, or more recently M17, pistols as well as M4 carbines. German tankers during World War II would be issued pistols such as the Walther Model 8 and Model 9, while modern German Leopard 2 crews are issued with MP7 PDWs or P8 pistols, depending on their role in the tank. Red Army tankers were issued with PPS-43 submachine guns, while Soviet and modern Russian tankers tend to be issued with the AKSU. France issues their latest HK416F in a short barreled version for their tank crews.

== Role ==
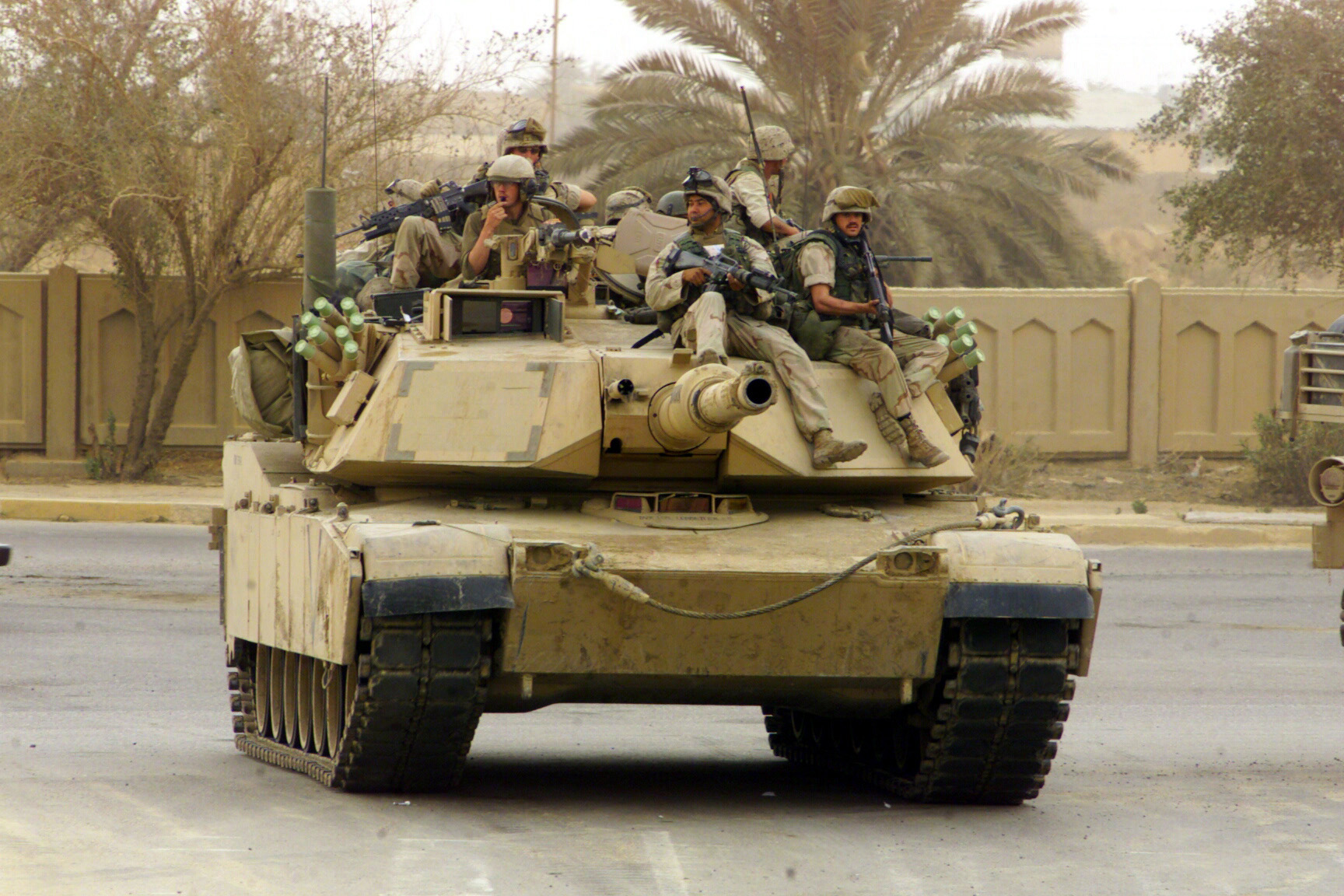
US Marines during the Iraq War ride on an M1A1 Abrams tank in April 2003.

The main battle tank fulfills the role the British had once called the "universal tank", filling almost all battlefield roles. They were originally designed in the Cold War to combat other MBTs. The modern light tank supplements the MBT in expeditionary roles and situations where all major threats have been neutralized and excess weight in armour and armament would only hinder mobility and cost more money to operate.

Reconnaissance by MBTs is performed in high-intensity conflicts where reconnaissance by light vehicles would be insufficient due to the necessity to "fight" for information.

In asymmetric warfare, main battle tanks are deployed in small, highly concentrated units. MBTs fire only at targets at close range and instead rely on external support such as unmanned aircraft for long range combat.

Main battle tanks have significantly varied characteristics. Procuring too many varieties can place a burden on tactics, training, support and maintenance.

The MBT has a positive morale effect on the infantry it accompanies. It also instills fear in the opposing force who can often hear and even feel their arrival.

== Procurement ==
=== Manufacture ===
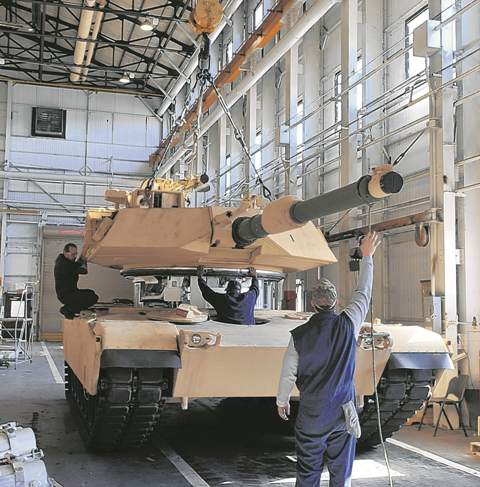
Mechanics at Anniston Army Depot line up an M1 Abrams turret with its hull.

MBT production is increasingly being outsourced to wealthy nations. Countries that are just beginning to produce tanks are having difficulties remaining profitable in an industry that is increasingly becoming more expensive through the sophistication of technology. Even some large-scale producers are seeing declines in production. Even China is divesting many of its MBTs.

The production of main battle tanks is limited to manufacturers that specialize in combat vehicles. Commercial manufacturers of civilian vehicles cannot easily be repurposed as MBT production facilities.

Prices for MBTs have more than tripled from 1943 to 2011, although this pales in comparison with the price increase in fighter aircraft from 1943 to 1975.

=== Exports and License Builds ===
MBT models, such as the French AMX-40, Italian OF-40, British Vickers MBT and more recently the Chinese VT-4, and upcoming German Panther KF51 can be developed and marketed almost solely as export vehicles and not used by the producing nations armed forces in large numbers, or at all. Other tanks, such as the Soviet T-54/5 and German Leopard 2, see widespread adoption by both their home nation as well as overseas. Some tank producers, such as Japan and Israel, choose not to market their creations for export. Others have export control laws in place.

Export variants of tanks exist, where a tank that was initially intended to be the fielded by a nation is modified for export. Export variants are usually downgraded versions of domestic tanks, having inferior armor and technology, or modified to prevent them from firing certain types of ammunition. Export variants may also not be newly produced tanks, but rather from surplus stock of existing tanks taken from storage.

This is usually done to control the ownership of the latest technologies used on tanks, both preventing the customer nation from owning it, as well as reducing the risk that an export tank gets captured by an adversary who are unable to assess the full capabilities of the tank due to the fact it does not truly represent the capabilities of the standard non-export model from which it is derived.

Export variants of Soviet military equipment, also known as "Monkey Models", were instances where a Soviet main battle tank used by the Soviet Armed Forces was modified and downgraded for export customers outside the USSR. Modern Russian tanks follow similar trends of using domestic models and downgrading them in several ways for export use, applying the moniker "S" to denote that the tank is an export model and inferior to domestic non-S models. For example the T-90M used by the Russian Armed Forces is sold abroad as the T-90MS, notably carrying three fewer main gun rounds with the Russian T-90M carrying 43 compared to the export T-90MS carrying 40. The MS features a 7.62mm caliber PKT light machine gun remote weapon station compared with the M model which is fitted with the 12.7mm caliber Kord heavy machine gun for its remote weapon station. The MS lacks the latest Arena-M active protection system installed on domestic M models, which also have more Kontakt-5 explosive reactive armor blocks and feature protective netting for the turret ring when compared to the MS.

The American M1 Abrams is also sold to export countries in a more stripped down variant, most notably is the absence of depleted uranium armor on the M1A2S variant of the M1A2 sold to Saudi Arabia.Other Abrams tanks have been equipped with diesel engines for export customers, differing from the standard turbine engine found in US versions of the tank.

In other cases, specialised, but not downgraded, versions of tanks will be produced for export to a specific country. The German Leopard 2 has been modified to meet various national requirements, such as the Canadian Leopard 2A4M CAN and A6 CAN, the Norwegian 2A8 NOR and the Spanish Leopard 2E.

Similarly, some nations may choose to upgrade tanks they import from other nations, featuring domestic elements, or using parts from other tanks. For example the British Sherman Firefly was an American M4 Sherman with a more powerful British-built QF 17-pounder gun fitted in place of the 75mm or 76mm gun. South Africa's current Main Battle Tank, the Olifant, is a heavily upgraded British Centurion tank, swapping the original British Rolls Royce Meteor 4B for the American Continental AV1790.

Tanks can also be licensed build, a practice dating back to even the earliest models of tanks produced during World War I. The first tanks mass-produced by America, the M1917, and Italy, the Fiat 3000, were licensed built copies of the French Renault FT light tank while the first Main Battle Tank to be licensed built was the Indian Vijayanta, a copy of the British Vickers MBT. More recently, the Panzer 87, built by Switzerland for its armed forces, is a licensed built copy of the German Leopard 2, and the T-72 has been licensed built in various nations, even after domestic production ended.

In other instances, countries may use another nations tanks to form the basis of their own tank production, developing the tank into a different one. This differs from licensed built examples in that the tank differs from the original model in significant ways, such as different powerpacks, fire control systems, armament and protection, while licensed built examples are usually one to one copies of the original model. Examples include and the Turkish Altay, based on the South Korean K2 Black Panther, having replaced the South Korean auto loader with a manual loading system, and the Chinese Type 99 based on the T-72 chassis.

== Current and future MBT development (2020s–) ==
As of the mid-2020s, several countries have launched parallel main battle tank (MBT) development programs in response to aging fleets, evolving battlefield threats such as unmanned aerial systems (UAS), and the ongoing war in Ukraine. These programs reflect a broader European Defence Fund (EDF) strategy of maintaining sovereign industrial capabilities and preparing for eventual convergence into a next-generation MBT family.

Key initiatives include:

- Type 100 tank (ZTZ-100): The Type 100 is a Chinese fourth-generation MBT that entered service in 2025. It uses a 105 mm gun, a radical departure from similar fourth-generation MBT concepts, and features a hybrid-electric drive, GL-6 active protection systems, and an armored crew capsule. The crew uses augmented-reality headsets to interface with cameras embedded around the tank, enabling them to process visual information within a 360-degree field of view. The PLA currently fields a low number of Type 100 MBTs for evaluation and training purposes.
- Leopard 2A8: Developed by Germany's KNDS Deutschland, the Leopard 2 A8 serves as an interim solution, integrating upgrades such as the Hensoldt MUSS 2.0 active protection system, a hybrid-ready powerpack, Safran Paseo panoramic sights, and a digital BMS V3 backbone. As of 2025, over 400 units have been ordered by Germany, Norway, Sweden, and Lithuania, with a low number of 2A8s in Norwegian service for evaluation and testing.
- M1E3 Abrams: A next-generation variant of the M1 Abrams tank family, this technology testbed/demonstrator vehicle is part of an initiative to modernize and future-proof the US Army's MBTs, integrating technologies such as a 3-man crew, autoloaded cannon, hybrid powertrain, and gun-launched ATGMs.
- Leopard 3: An experimental demonstrator platform developed by Rheinmetall of Germany, intended to test key subsystems for MGCS. It features a 130 mm smoothbore gun, AI-based fire control, optional remote turret, and enhanced mobility via hybrid-electric drive. Leopard 3 bridges the technological gap between current systems and MGCS fielding.
- Main Ground Combat System (MGCS): A Franco-German project formally launched in 2017, MGCS aims to field a new "system-of-systems" to replace the Leopard 2 and Leclerc tanks by 2040. The MGCS Project Company (MPC) was formed in 2025 by KNDS (Germany and France), Rheinmetall, and Thales to serve as the industrial prime contractor. The system is expected to include a manned MBT, robotic wingmen, and integrated counter-UAS and AI command layers.
- FMBTech (Future Main Battle Tank Technologies): This European Union project was launched in April 2025 with €19.9 million in European Defence Fund (EDF) funding; the programme, led by French company Thales, develops modular subsystems—such as crew-machine interfaces, sensor fusion, and AI command tools—for integration into both legacy and future MBTs.
- Future Main Battle Tank (FMBT): The Future Main Battle Tank is being developed by the Indian Combat Vehicles Research and Development Establishment (CVRDE) of the Defence Research and Development Organisation (DRDO) for the Indian Army. The FMBT design is expected to replace the older generation MBTs of the Indian Army Armoured Corps from 2030 onwards. The tank is a further development of the previous generation Arjun main battle tanks of the Army. FMBT is to be fitted with the 1500hp DATRAN engine.
- MARTE (Main ARmoured Tank of Europe): Also European-Defence-Fund-backed, MARTE is a clean-sheet tank development initiative led by Franco-German KNDS and Germany's Rheinmetall. It emphasizes life-cycle cost modeling, 3D digital prototyping, and platform-agnostic architecture not limited to the Leopard or Leclerc lineage.

== See also ==
- Armoured warfare
- List of the United States military vehicles by model number
- List of main battle tanks by country
- List of main battle tanks by generation
- Tanks in the Cold War
- Tanks of the post–Cold War era

== Bibliography ==
- Ogorkiewicz, Richard (2018). Tanks: 100 Years of Evolution. Oxford: Osprey Publishing. ISBN 9781472829818.
