= Future Main Battle Tank =

Indian main battle tank programme

- Type: Main battle tank
- Place of origin: India

Production history
- Designer: Combat Vehicles Research and Development Establishment (DRDO)
- Designed: 2010–present
- Manufacturer: Armoured Vehicles Nigam Limited (at Heavy Vehicles Factory)
- Developed from: Arjun

Specifications
- Mass: <55 tons
- Crew: 3-4
- Armour: ERA–NERA, Kanchan armour, Active protection system
- Main armament: 1× 120 mm smoothbore tank gun able to fire SAMHO, HEAT, APFSDS, HESH, PCB, Thermobaric rounds
- Secondary armament: 1 × 12.7mm AA MG; 1 × 7.62 mm coaxial MG
- Engine: DATRAN; 1,500 hp (1,118 kW) V12 engine
- Power/weight: 30 hp/ton
- Transmission: 1500 hp automatic transmission by CVRDE
- Suspension: Hydropneumatic

The Future Main Battle Tank (FMBT) is a next-generation main battle tank being developed by the Combat Vehicles Research and Development Establishment (CVRDE) of the Defence Research and Development Organisation (DRDO) for the Indian Army. The FMBT design is expected to replace the older generation MBTs of the Indian Army Armoured Corps from 2030 onwards. The tank is a further development of the previous generation Arjun main battle tanks of the Army.

== Development ==
Following the successful performance of the Arjun Mk1 MBT against T-90 during trials in Rajasthan in March 2010, DRDO started a programme to develop next-generation Future Main Battle Tank (FMBT) for the Indian Army. The development was first reported in 2010. The development cost was reported to be approximately ₹5,000 crore (equivalent to ₹110 billion or US$1.2 billion in 2023) while the tanks would cost around ₹25 crore (equivalent to ₹56 crore or US$5.9 million in 2023) per FMBT. The key stakeholders of the project includes the Army, quality control personnel and the production agency. The development will take 7-8 years from the date of sanction. The PSQR has been formalised. When the detailed specifications of the FMBT is finalised, they will be listed in GSQR. The FMBT is planned to be produced by Heavy Vehicles Factory, Avadi.

As reported by the then Minister of Defence A.K. Antony to the Lok Sabha on 6 December 2010, the Preliminary Staff Qualitative Requirements (PSQR) for the tank has been formulated by the Army, while the feasibility study is being carried out by DRDO. The development would be completed by 2020.

However, as per reports in 2012, the Army could not decide the desired specifications and the PSQR was not formalised of the FMBT including the crew configuration (three-crew or four-crew). PSQR is important for sanctioning and funding the development programme. This meant that the Defence Minister had “misled” the Parliament earlier. However, CVRDE had started its development before the finalising of PSQR.

In September 2021, the tank completed its Preliminary Design Review (PDR).

=== Engine development ===
The DATRAN 1500 engine had its first test in 2023. On 20 March 2024, the prototype engine was again successfully tested at BEML's Engine Division Mysuru facility. The engine has electronic control, a self-cleaning air filter, CRDi fuel injection system, and electronic warning control. In addition, the engine has a high power-to-weight ratio and can run in a variety of harsh environments, such as over 5,000 m (16,000 ft) above mean sea level, in sub-zero temperature of −40 °C, and up to +55 °C in a hot desert environment. A total of 20 prototypes of the engines, with an emphasis on technology stabilization, will be produced in 2024 and put through additional testing to evaluate their performance, robustness, and dependability. The project is expected to be completed by the middle of 2025.

The director of CVRDE, the nodal laboratory under DRDO for the programme, had formally commenced the integration activities of the DATRAN Test Vehicle on 4 December 2025 by mounting one of the subsystems. The DATRAN Test Vehicle is a test platform for vehicle trials of the indigenous 1500 hp DATRAN transmission and the 1500 hp engine being developed by CVRDE. The power pack is in an advanced stage of development. Meanwhile, the testbed is being developed as the precursor for future AFV platforms. Shri S Srinivasa Rao is the Program Director (Powerpack) and Project Director (DATRAN-1500) whereas Shri S Mathi is the Project Manager (DATRAN-1500).

== Design ==
The tank is to weigh around 50 tonnes and will feature active protection system (which can shoot down enemy anti-tank projectiles before they strike the FMBT), extreme mobility, CBRN defense capabilities (to conduct operations without exposing the crew to harmful radiation), and the network-centric operation capability (providing full situational awareness to the crew even when “buttoned down” inside the tank). The armaments of the tank will include 120 mm smoothbore main gun (ATGM-capable) and two small-calibre machine guns. The tank will have a modular design, enabling the tanks to integrate new technology with time. The volume occupied by electronics package is less when compared to earlier Arjun tank variants. Also, the engine size will be two-thirds of those used earlier. The FMBT is to be equipped with advanced electro-optical sight systems and possibly a high power laser weapon system.

=== Mobility ===
As reported in 2010, an indigenous engine, capable of providing a power output of 1,500 hp (1,100 kW) was to be developed for DRDO's Future Main Battle Tank (FMBT) programme. A national team had been formed, including members from academia, the user, industry, and the DRDO. The prototype would be ready by 4-5 yrs. Another project to develop the automatic transmission system for the tank was being launched. The indigenous engine, along with the transmission, will collectively form the Bharat Power Pack which will meet the FMBT's mobility requirements.

As of 2012, DRDO had launched a “mission mode” project to develop the engine. The development project includes companies like Kirloskar Oil Engines, BEML, and the Mahindra & Mahindra; research institutions like Indian Institutes of Technology (IITs); and bodies like the Automotive Research Association of India, Pune. An Indian “prime contractor” would assemble the engines from sub-components delivered by a network of sub-contractors. As reported, the DRDO had been trying to bring in international consultants for assistance in designing the engine. By then, German companies MTU and Renk had refused to provide consultancy and, as of then, consultancy proposals from Ricardo of Britain and AVL of Austria were being evaluated. DRDO had also issued an Expression of Interest (EoI) to select an Indian partner to manufacture the engine. The selected consultant will work in a consortium including DRDO, the Army (user), and the Indian manufacturing partner. As per the 2012 timeline, the programme includes 12 months for designing, an additional 18 months for prototype development – a total of 30–36 months to begin testing of the prototype.

The DATRAN 1500 engine had its first test in 2023. On 20 March 2024, the prototype engine was again successfully tested at BEML's Engine Division Mysuru facility. The engine has electronic control, a self-cleaning air filter, CRDi fuel injection system, and electronic warning control. In addition, the engine has a high power-to-weight ratio and can run in a variety of harsh environments, such as over 5,000 m (16,000 ft) above mean sea level, in sub-zero temperature of −40 °C, and up to +55 °C in a hot desert environment. A total of 20 prototypes of the engines, with an emphasis on technology stabilization, will be produced in 2024 and put through additional testing to evaluate their performance, robustness, and dependability. The project is expected to be completed by the middle of 2025.

== See also ==
- List of main battle tanks by generation
- Arjun (tank) – (India)
- Zorawar (tank) – (India)
- Future Ready Combat Vehicle – (India)
