= Combat Vehicles Research and Development Establishment =

Laboratory in Chennai, India

Combat Vehicle Research & Development Establishment
- Established: March 1976
- Field of research: Vehicle Research
- Director: Shri J RAJESHKUMAR Outstanding Scientist & Scientist-H
- Location: Avadi, Chennai-600 054, Avadi, Chennai
- Operating agency: DRDO
- Website: CVRDE Home Page

Combat Vehicles Research and Development Establishment (CVRDE) is a laboratory of the Defence Research and Development Organisation (DRDO). Located at Avadi, in Chennai, India. It is the main DRDO lab involved in the development of armoured fighting vehicles, Tanks, Automotive electronics and many other.

== History ==
After the Independence of India, the Chief Inspectorate of Mechanical Transport Establishment (MTE), which was previously located in Chaklala, Pakistan, was moved to Ahmednagar. It was later renamed as Vehicle Research & Development Establishment (VRDE), Ahmednagar.

In 1965, the Heavy Vehicles Factory under the Ordnance Factory Board was set up at Avadi to manufacture Vijayanta Tanks. A detachment of VRDE was established there to provide R&D support. In March 1976, the VRDE detachment at Avadi was split off from VRDE and re-designated as Combat Vehicles Research & Development Establishment (CVRDE), as an independent DRDO laboratory responsible for Research & Development of Armoured Fighting Vehicles.

During CVRDE's Golden Jubilee in 2024, it was noted by Indian government officials that CVRDE should lend a greater focus on innovation emerging trends in the overall defence industry.

== Areas of Work ==
CVRDE has been tasked with the design, development and testing of tracked combat vehicles and specialized tracked vehicles. It has also designed certain aircraft subsystems, mainly related to the engine and hydraulics. Like many DRDO labs, it also develops civilian technologies based on spin-offs of the defence related products developed by it. It has recently started developing Unmanned Ground Vehicles of the tracked category.

== Projects and Products ==
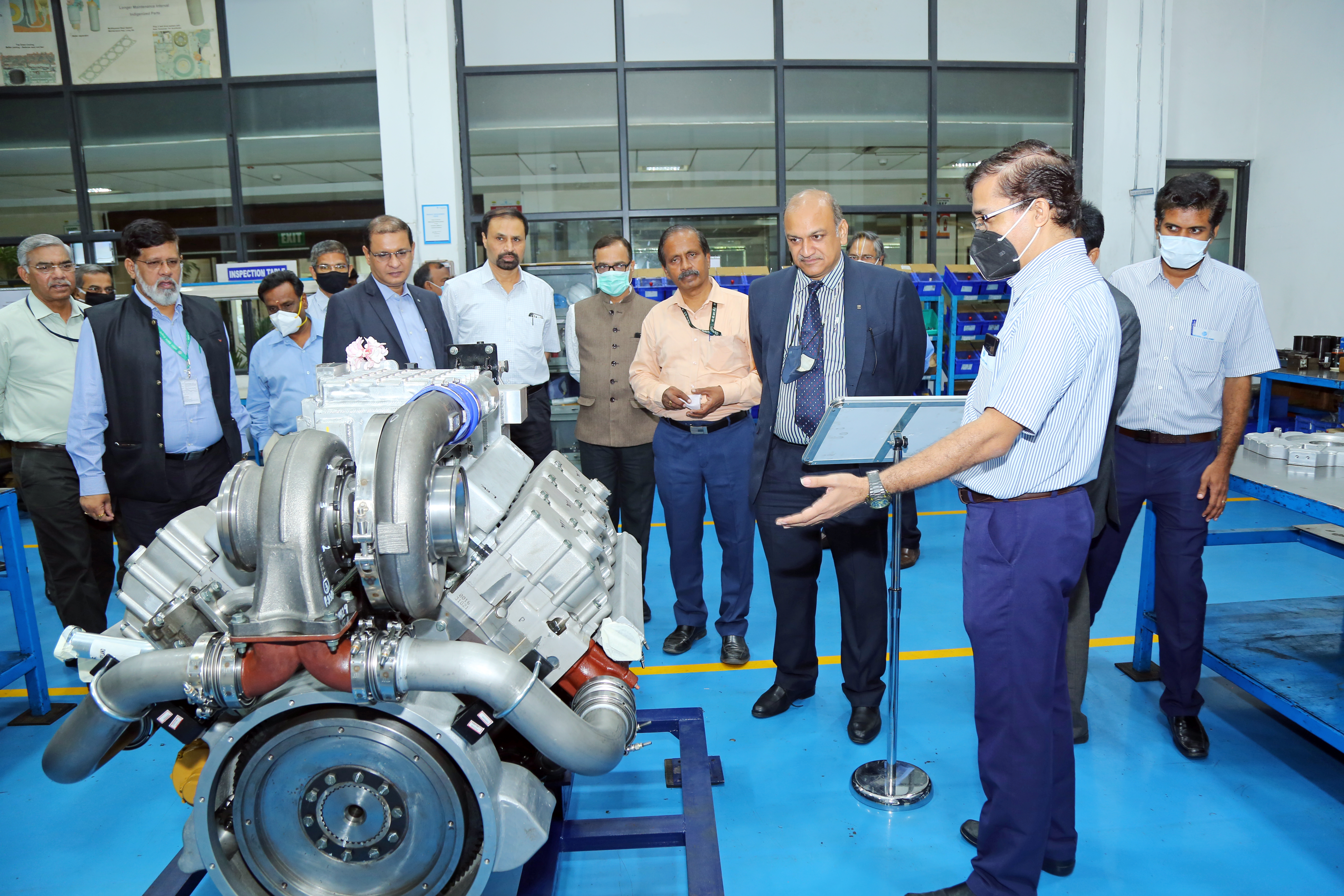
CVRDE 600-hp engine.

CVRDE is the main research lab responsible for the development of the Arjun main battle tank, 248 of which have been ordered by the Indian Army. It has also developed the Tank-EX, Bhim Self Propelled Artillery, based on the Arjun Chassis, and the Combat Improved Ajeya, an upgrade of the Indian Army's T-72 Tanks.

Apart from these, CVRDE has also developed other combat and Engineering Vehicles, like Armored Cars, Bridge-layer Tanks, Armoured Recovery Vehicles and a Mortar Carrier based on the BMP-2 chassis.

CVRDE is also working on many technologies related to Armoured Fighting vehicles. CVRDE has a division dedicated to development of Automatic transmissions for Armored Fighting Vehicles. It has developed transmissions of various power ranges viz. 1500, 800, 150 hp. It has developed various subsystems of transmission like torque converter, Fluid coupling and retarder, Steering units, Final drives etc. Muntra, India's first ever unmanned armored vehicle was developed here.

CVRDE has also developed the Zorawar light tank which, as of 2024, has completed live-fire trials and is also expected to undertake limited user testing in the same year.

=== Engines and transmissions ===
==== DATRAN 1500 ====
As reported in 2010, an indigenous engine, capable of providing a power output of 1,500 hp (1,100 kW) was to be developed for DRDO's Future Main Battle Tank (FMBT) programme. A national team had been formed, including members from academia, the user, industry, and the DRDO. The prototype would be ready by 4-5 yrs. Another project to develop the automatic transmission system for the tank was being launched. The indigenous engine, along with the transmission, will collectively form the Bharat Power Pack which will meet the FMBT's mobility requirements.

As of 2012, DRDO had launched a “mission mode” project to develop the engine. The development project includes companies like Kirloskar Oil Engines, BEML, and the Mahindra & Mahindra; research institutions like Indian Institutes of Technology (IITs); and bodies like the Automotive Research Association of India, Pune. An Indian “prime contractor” would assemble the engines from sub-components delivered by a network of sub-contractors. As reported, the DRDO had been trying to bring in international consultants for assistance in designing the engine. By then, German companies MTU and Renk had refused to provide consultancy and, as of then, consultancy proposals from Ricardo of Britain and AVL of Austria were being evaluated. DRDO had also issued an Expression of Interest (EoI) to select an Indian partner to manufacture the engine. The selected consultant will work in a consortium including DRDO, the Army (user), and the Indian manufacturing partner. As per the 2012 timeline, the programme includes 12 months for designing, an additional 18 months for prototype development – a total of 30–36 months to begin testing of the prototype.

As of February 2024, reports suggest the German-origin engine of Arjun Mk1A variant will be replaced by the DATRAN 1500 engine, which is being developed by DRDO and is currently under testing phase. This is because of the sudden closure of MTU Friedrichshafen's supply chain, which is expected to take four years more to restart.

The DATRAN 1500 engine had its first test in 2023. On 20 March 2024, the prototype engine was again successfully tested at BEML's Engine Division Mysuru facility. The engine has electronic control, a self-cleaning air filter, CRDi fuel injection system, and electronic warning control. In addition, the engine has a high power-to-weight ratio and can run in a variety of harsh environments, such as over 5,000 m (16,000 ft) above mean sea level, in sub-zero temperature of −40 °C, and up to +55 °C in a hot desert environment. A total of 20 prototypes of the engines, with an emphasis on technology stabilization, will be produced in 2024 and put through additional testing to evaluate their performance, robustness, and dependability. The project is expected to be completed by the middle of 2025.

The Bharat Power Pack weighs 2,200 kg (4,900 lb). After initial trials, the performance of the engine is to be tested onboard a modified Arjun MBT prototype which would be heavier than the in-service main battle tanks of the Army or the MBTs the engine would power (Arjun variants, FMBT and FRCV). The engine could also be integrated on T-90MkIII (an advanced Indian variant) from 2027–28.

The director of CVRDE, the nodal laboratory under DRDO for the programme, had formally commenced the integration activities of the DATRAN Test Vehicle on 4 December 2025 by mounting one of the subsystems. The DATRAN Test Vehicle is a test platform for vehicle trials of the indigenous 1500 hp DATRAN transmission and the 1500 hp engine being developed by CVRDE. The power pack is in an advanced stage of development. Meanwhile, the testbed is being developed as the precursor for future AFV platforms. Shri S Srinivasa Rao is the Program Director (Powerpack) and Project Director (DATRAN-1500) whereas Shri S Mathi is the Project Manager (DATRAN-1500).

==== Integrated Automotive Vetronics System ====
Developed by CVRDE, the Integrated Automotive Vetronics System (IAVS) is a health monitoring system developed for tanks and armoured fighting vehicles operated by the Indian Army. The IAVS is a "system of systems" which integrates sensors and subsystems on board the Arjun to make the tank an efficient fighting machine. The IAVS monitors the data bus that interlaces the hull and turret subsystems, analyses automotive performance and alerts the crew when maintenance is due.

The system also integrates the driver's enhanced sight system and provides automated driving. The tank crew interacts with the system through an integrated touch screen display. Its trials were successfully completed in August 2015 during which the prototype covered 430 kilometres (270 mi) under harsh weather conditions.

==== 600 HP engine ====
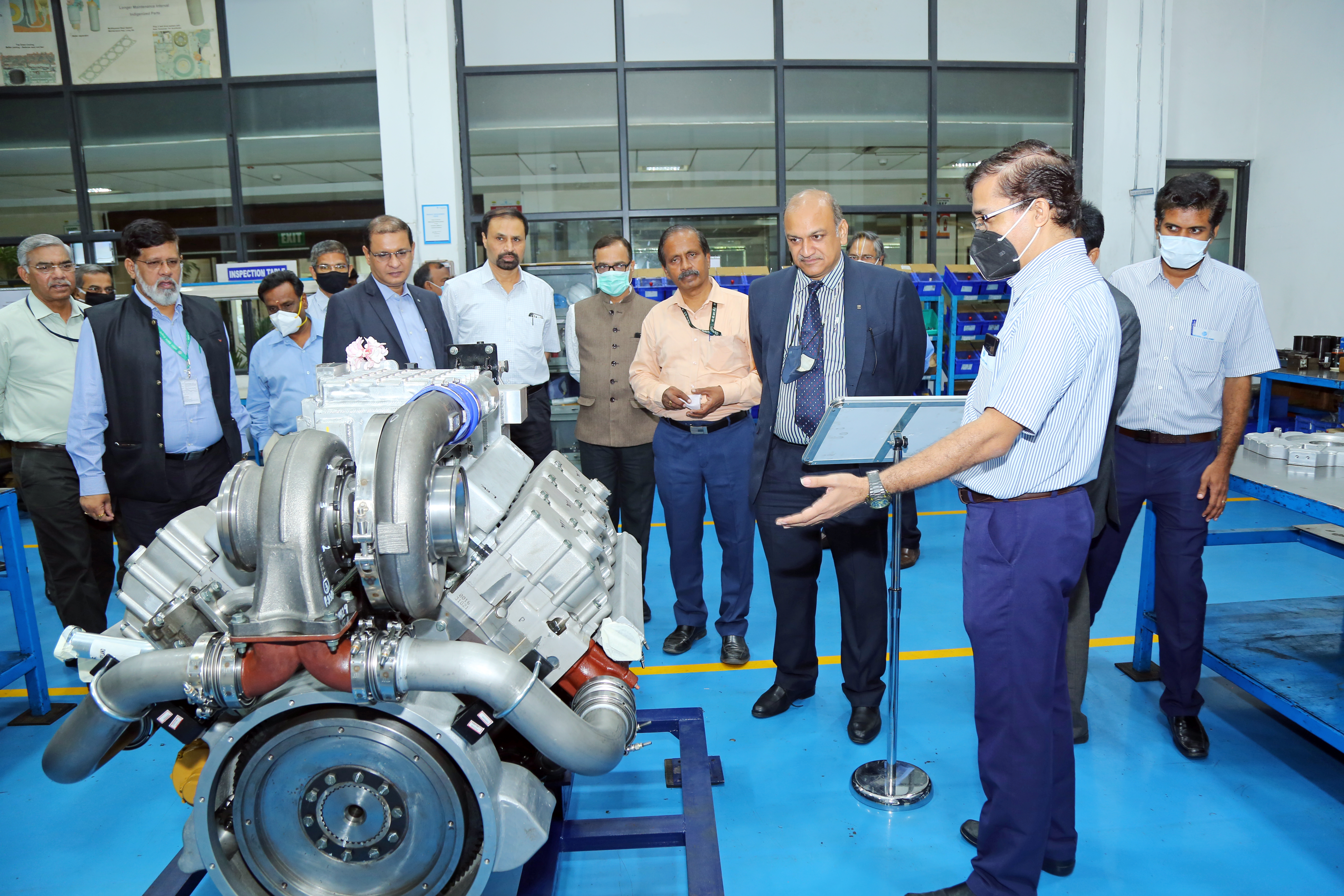
CVRDE 600-hp engine.

As reported in December 2021, Ashok Leyland has partnered with Combat Vehicles Research and Development Establishment (CVRDE) under the DRDO to design, develop and produce a 600-hp indigenous engine for the DRDO WhAP. As per the reports the prototype engine has been manufactured and will undergo rigorous testing in the lab and will be qualified for application in armoured fighting vehicles (AFV). Series production is scheduled to begin after operational start-up. The testing was inaugurated in the Engine Development Centre, Ashok Leyland, Vellivoyalchavadi, near Chennai.

==== 800 HP engine ====
As of July 2025, the CVRDE issued a Request for Information (RFI) to Indian vendors for the development of an 800 HP engine with an indigenous automatic transmission to power future tracked armoured fighting vehicles of the 25–30 tonne categories. While CVRE will design the subsystems of the powertrain and the core systems, the selected Indian vendors will be responsible for the fabrication, assembly, and tests of the prototype transmission as well as supplier-specific design modifications. The proposed powerpack will be a compact, T-shaped design with modern cooling and fan systems. The interested vendor must demonstrate multiple complex capabilities like experience with automatic transmissions rated above 300 HP and ISO 9001-certified among others. The vendor's facilities must be within India and should be able to supply transmissions at a rate of 100 units per year for at least 30 years. The vendor's project team must have a strength of at least 10 design engineers.

== See also ==
- AVANI
- Arjun (tank)
- Armoured Vehicle Tracked Light Repair
- BLT T-72
- CMF T-72
- Drdo Armoured Ambulance
- DRDO light tank
- M-46 Catapult
- Zorawar (tank)
