= Arjun (tank) =

Indian main battle tank

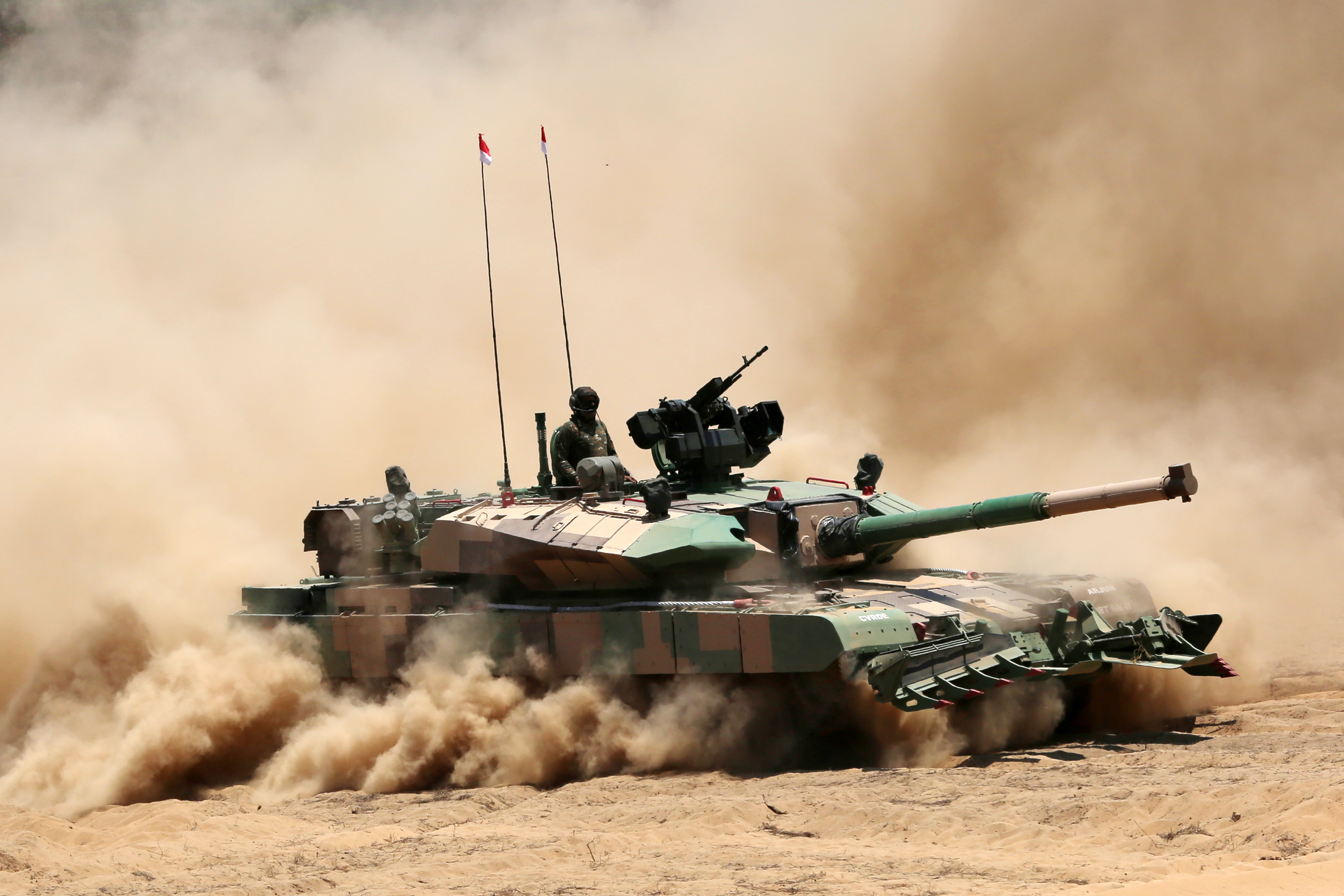
- New Arjun MK1A variant during field trials.
- Type: Main battle tank
- Place of origin: India

Production history
- Designer: Combat Vehicles Research and Development Establishment
- Designed: 1983–1996
- Manufacturer: Armoured Vehicles Nigam Limited (at Heavy Vehicles Factory)
- Developed into: Future Main Battle Tank
- Produced: 2004–present
- No. built: 141 (as of 2021) (Note: 15 pre-production prototypes (PPS-1 to PPS-15), 124 Arjun MK1, 2 MK1A prototypes.)
- Variants: See Variants

Specifications
- Mass: MK1: 58.5 tonnes (57.6 long tons; 64.5 short tons); MK1A: 68 tonnes (67 long tons; 75 short tons)
- Length: MK1: 10.19 metres (33 ft 5 in); MK1A: 10.64 metres (34 ft 11 in)
- Width: MK1: 3.85 metres (12 ft 8 in); MK1A: 3.95 metres (13 ft 0 in)
- Height: MK1: 2.32 metres (7 ft 7 in); MK1A: ~2.8 metres (9 ft 2 in)
- Crew: 4 (commander, gunner, loader and driver)
- Armour: ERA–NERA, Kanchan armour
- Main armament: 1× 120 mm rifled tank gun able to fire LAHAT, SAMHO, HEAT, APFSDS, HESH, PCB, Thermobaric rounds (Rate of fire: 6–8 rounds/minute, total: 42 containerized rounds)
- Secondary armament: 1 × NSV 12.7mm AA MG on BEL RCWS; 1 × MAG 7.62 mm Tk715 coaxial MG; 12 × 81mm AT-AL smoke grenades. (MK1) 16 × 81mm AT-AL smoke grenades. (MK1A)
- Engine: MK1: MTU MB 838 Ka-501 V10; 1,400 hp (1,030 kW) liquid-cooled turbocharged diesel engine MK1A: DATRAN; 1,500 hp (1,118 kW) V12 engine
- Power/weight: MK1: 24 hp/ton
- Transmission: Renk epicyclic train gearbox, 4 forward + 2 reverse gears. CVRDE automatic transmission in development
- Suspension: Hydropneumatic
- Ground clearance: 0.45 metres (1 ft 6 in)
- Fuel capacity: 1,610 litres (350 imp gal; 430 US gal)
- Operational range: MK1: 450 kilometres (280 mi)
- Maximum speed: MK1: ~70 km/h (43 mph); 40 km/h (25 mph) cross country

The Arjun (pronounced [ɐɽˈdʑʊn]) is a third generation main battle tank developed by the Combat Vehicles Research and Development Establishment (CVRDE) of the Defence Research and Development Organisation (DRDO), for the Indian Army. The tank is named after Arjuna, the archer prince who is the main protagonist of the Indian epic poem Mahabharata. Design work began in 1986 and was finished in 1996. The Arjun main battle tank entered service with the Indian Army in 2004. The 43rd Armoured Regiment was the first regiment to receive the Arjun.

The Arjun features a 120 mm rifled main gun with indigenously developed armour-piercing fin-stabilized discarding-sabot ammunition, one PKT 7.62 mm coaxial machine gun and a NSVT 12.7 mm machine gun. Powered by a single MTU multi-fuel diesel engine rated at 1,400 hp, it can achieve a maximum speed of 70 km/h (43 mph) and a cross-country speed of 40 km/h (25 mph). It has a four-man crew: commander, gunner, loader and driver.

In 2010 and 2013, the Indian Army carried out comparative trials in the Thar Desert of Rajasthan, pitting the newly inducted Arjun MK1 against the Indian Army's frontline Russian-designed T-90 tanks, during which the Arjun reportedly exhibited better accuracy and mobility.

The fire-control system (FCS) originally developed for the Arjun main battle tank has been integrated into the T-90 tanks built in India under a transfer of technology (ToT) agreement by the Heavy Vehicles Factory (HVF) at Avadi.

== History ==
After the 1971 Bangladesh Liberation War, the Government of India decided to develop a new main battle tank. The Indian Army issued a general staff qualitative requirement (GSQR) for a new battle tank, called for a 50 tonne main battle tank equipped with a 120 mm rifled gun, computerised FCS and powered by a 1,400 hp diesel engine. The programme to develop an indigenous tank was authorised in 1974 and funds were released for its development. In 1976, the Combat Vehicles Research and Development Establishment (CVRDE) was established under the Defence Research and Development Organisation (DRDO) to undertake the development of the Arjun main battle tank and to carry out research and development (R&D) on future combat vehicles for the Indian Army.

In 1983, the project began following a consultancy agreement with Krauss-Maffei, who had previously developed the Leopard 2, to oversee design, development and evaluation, while Indian state owned Bharat Electronics Limited (BEL) and HVF were joined with the CVRDE in the development of the Arjun. The original plan envisaged the development and rollout of the first tank prototype by 1980, which was later revised to 1987. The first prototype was delivered in 1989. The prototype tank resembled the Leo2A4 main battle tank of Germany.

From 1993 to 1996, the Indian Army carried out an extensive series of trials, which revealed some major defects in the tank, including the engine overheating and suboptimal performance of the weapons system. (Note: The initial prototypes of the Arjun were equipped with FCS developed for the Vijayanta Mark 1B main battle tanks.) By the end of 1996, 14 pre-production series (PPS) tanks (PPS-1 to PPS-14) were built and delivered to the Indian Army to conduct trials. Based on these trials, the Army identified 10 shortcomings that needed to be addressed before inaugurating the tank into the service. During this period, the cost of the Arjun programme increased significantly from the 1974 estimate of ₹15.50 crore (equivalent to ₹464 crore or US$49.1 million in 2023) to a developmental cost of ₹307.48 crore (equivalent to ₹18 billion or US$193.8 million in 2023) in 1995.

The initial delays and cost escalations were attributed to the sequential revisions done to the original General Staff Qualitative Requirement (GSQR) issued in 1974 to accommodate new features. In 1996, the development of the PPS-15 tank prototype was initiated to address the shortcomings listed by the Army. In 1997, a 'joint action plan' was formulated to address the identified flaws and to make the tank ready for induction. By 1999, both the Army and Cabinet Committee on Security (CCS) gave clearance for a limited production run of the Arjun main battle tank based on the PPS-15 prototype. In 2000, the Indian Army placed an order for the procurement of 124 Arjun MK1 tanks. (Note: First variant of Arjun MBT is designated as Arjun MK1 or Mark 1.)

=== Production and deployment ===
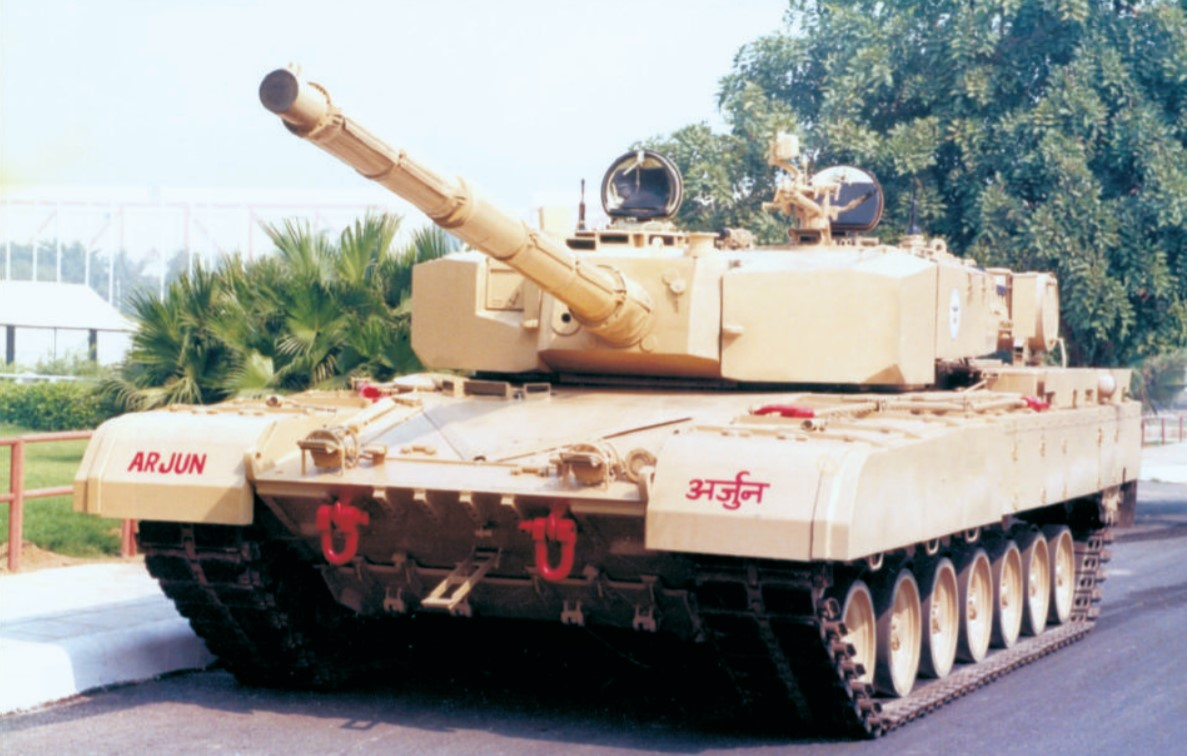
An early Arjun production model

One Arjun tank (PPS-15) operated by the 43rd Armoured Regiment made a public appearance in the 1997 and 2001 Republic Day Parades. The serial production of the Arjun main battle tank began in 2003 at HVF Avadi. The first tank equipped with the BEL developed Integrated Fire Control System (IFCS), ballistic computer and gunner's main sight, was rolled out in 2004 and delivered in the first batch of five Arjun tanks on 7 August 2004. The first tranche of production version Arjun tanks was delivered to the 43rd Armoured Regiment in 2004. By 2009, two armoured regiments had been equipped with the vehicle. The two regiments with Arjun MBT were 43rd and 75th Armoured Regiment. The first test firing of the LAHAT-launched (Laser Homing Attack or Laser Homing Anti-Tank gun) anti-tank guided missile was carried out in 2004.

By 2006, unit maintenance and unit repair vehicles developed for the Arjun-equipped regiments had been cleared for induction. In 2008, a multi-purpose mobile camouflage system (MCS), developed as part of the Defensive Aid System (DAS) project, had been completed successfully. Field evaluation trials were conducted on the Arjun MK1 main battle tank in 2009. In 2009, an advanced laser warning countermeasure system (ALWCS) and a fibre-optic gyro-based sensor package unit was developed and integrated on the Arjun MK1 main battle tank after field trials were carried out in two phases from May to August 2009. The first batch of the Armament Research & Development Establishment (ARDE) developed recoil system for the Arjun was delivered to the HVF Avadi after successful completion of field trials in 2009; the total order was for 124 systems.

In 2010, combat simulators (turret and driver simulators) developed for the Arjun had been inducted into the Army, its development was authorised in 2009. By June 2011, more than 100 tanks had been delivered to the Indian Army. The delivery of all 124 tanks was completed by mid-2012. From 2013 to 2015, 75% of the Arjun tanks had to be grounded because of a lack of spare parts. By 2016, this problem had been rectified, and the tanks returned to active service.

=== Upgrades ===
In 2010, the DRDO proposed an improved variant of the Arjun designated as the Arjun MK2 as a next step in the programme. The configuration of the new variant was finalised in mid-2010 after consultations with the army. The new tank was redesigned to have 89 major and minor improvements intended to enhance the firepower and survivability of the tank. Of these, 73 improvements could be fitted easily on the existing MK1 variant tanks. In the same year, the Indian Army placed an order for the procurement of 124 Arjun MK2 tanks, which was later approved by the Defence Acquisition Council (DAC). In 2011, the first MK2 prototype was built. This incorporated some 20 improvements, including a new commander's independent panoramic sight system. The tank was handed over to the army to carry out validation trial phase one. By 2012, the first complete prototype incorporating all the listed improvements was rolled out for system validation trial phase two.

As part of the developmental trials, the first phase of the LAHAT gun-launched anti-tank guided missile firing trials were carried out by 2013. In 2015, DRDO developed an Integrated Automotive Vetronics System (IAVS) that was integrated into the Arjun MK2 prototype tank. Field trials were carried out over 430 kilometres (270 mi) under harsh environmental conditions. In 2014 and 2016, two new rounds, Penetration-Cum-Blast and Thermobaric, were developed for the Arjun tank and successfully tested. Impact assessments were also carried out with instruments to measure shock and blast pressure.

In the meantime, the Arjun MK2 variant was redesignated as the Arjun Mk1A. By 2018, two Arjun Mk1A prototypes had been built and completed user trials by the end of the year. In May 2023, it's reported that the Mk1A will have 72 new features.

In February 2024, DRDO reported that deliveries of the Mk1A are facing delays because of shortages of tank engines.

In June 2025, BEML entered into an agreement with DRDO's VRDE to manufacture Unit Repair Vehicle (URV), Unit Maintenance Vehicle (UMV) and Full Trailer for 70T Tank Transporter equipped with an Advanced Hydraulic Suspension System for Arjun MBT.

== Design ==
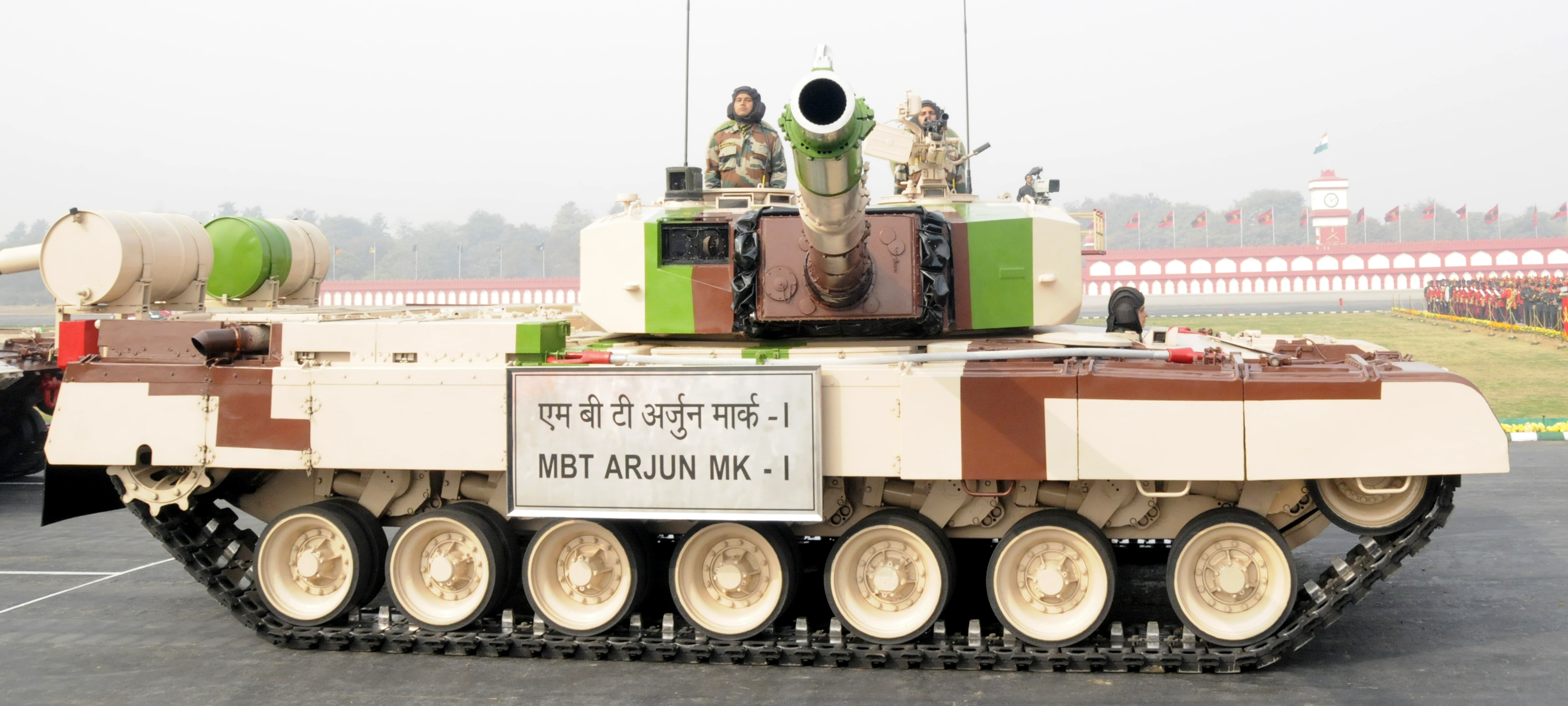
Arjun MK1

=== Armament ===
==== Primary ====
The Arjun main battle tank has a 120 mm rifled gun fitted with an ARDE-developed (Armament Research and Development Establishment) recoil system, muzzle reference system and fume extractor, which can fire a variety of guided or unguided anti-armour munitions. The main gun is made from high strength electro-slag remelting (ESR) steel which is insulated with a thermal sleeve and autofrettaged to withstand higher pressure. The newer Arjun Mk1A variant retains the 120 mm rifled gun with improved barrel, although India has developed a 125 mm smoothbore gun for the T-90 tank, which is under license for production.

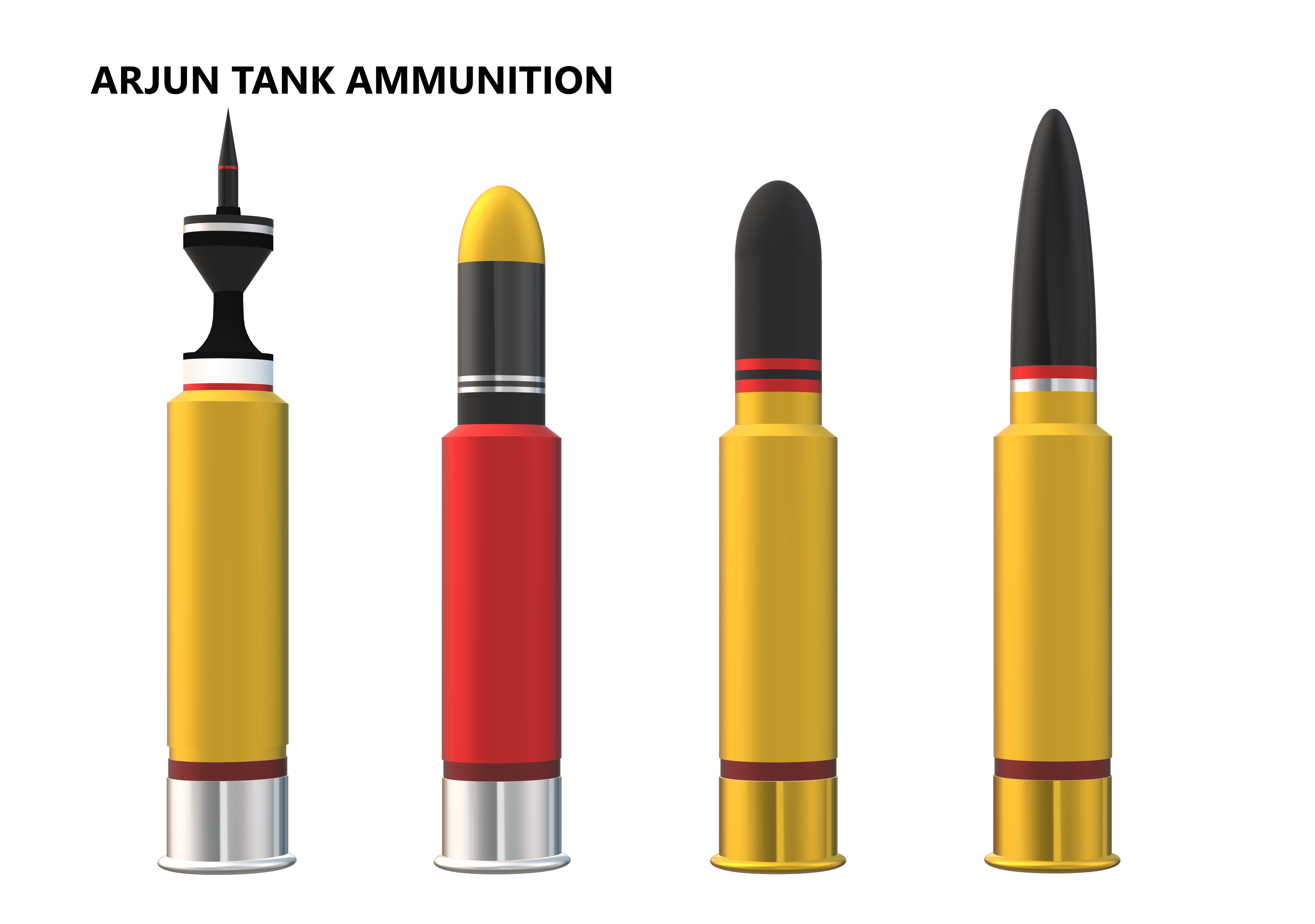
Arjun Tank ammunition, from left to right: APFSDS—designated locally as FSAPDS, HESH, TB, and PCB rounds

The Arjun MK1 can fire several types of munitions, including indigenously developed armour-piercing fin-stabilized discarding sabot (APFSDS) and dual purpose high-explosive squash head (HESH) rounds. The Arjun MK1 can carry a mix of 42 APFSDS and HESH rounds in blast-proof canisters with blow out panels. In 2017, the Mark 2 variant of the APFSDS with a long rod tungsten alloy penetrator was developed and successfully tested by ARDE for the new Alpha variant of the Arjun (Mk1A). The new APFSDS Mark 2 round reportedly has improved penetration compared to the extant Mark 1 round. In addition to the existing rounds, the ARDE also developed and successfully tested two high explosive 120 mm rounds for the Arjun: Penetration Cum Blast (PCB) and Thermobaric (TB) Ammunition for urban warfare, which can be fired from existing MK1 and newer Mk1A tanks.

===== SAMHO =====
To enhance the firepower of the Arjun, DRDO earlier considered equipping the tank with a LAHAT gun-launched anti-tank guided missile, but in 2014, it was announced the plan had been dropped. In the same year, DRDO announced the development of an Indian-made, gun-launched guided missile under Cannon Launched Guided Missile Programme (CLMDP), the SAMHO. In 2020, DRDO successfully test fired SAMHO from an Arjun main battle tank.

ARDE developed the SAMHO missile in association with the High Energy Materials Research Laboratory (HEMRL) and the Instruments Research and Development Establishment (IRDE). The SAMHO guided missile has two high-explosive anti-tank (HEAT) tandem-charge warheads designed to defeat explosive reactive armour (ERA) protection. The SAMHO is a dual purpose guided missile which can engage and neutralise armoured fighting vehicles, tanks, and low flying targets such as attack helicopters at a minimum range of 1.5 kilometres (0.93 mi) and maximum range of up to 5 kilometres (3.1 mi).

==== Secondary ====
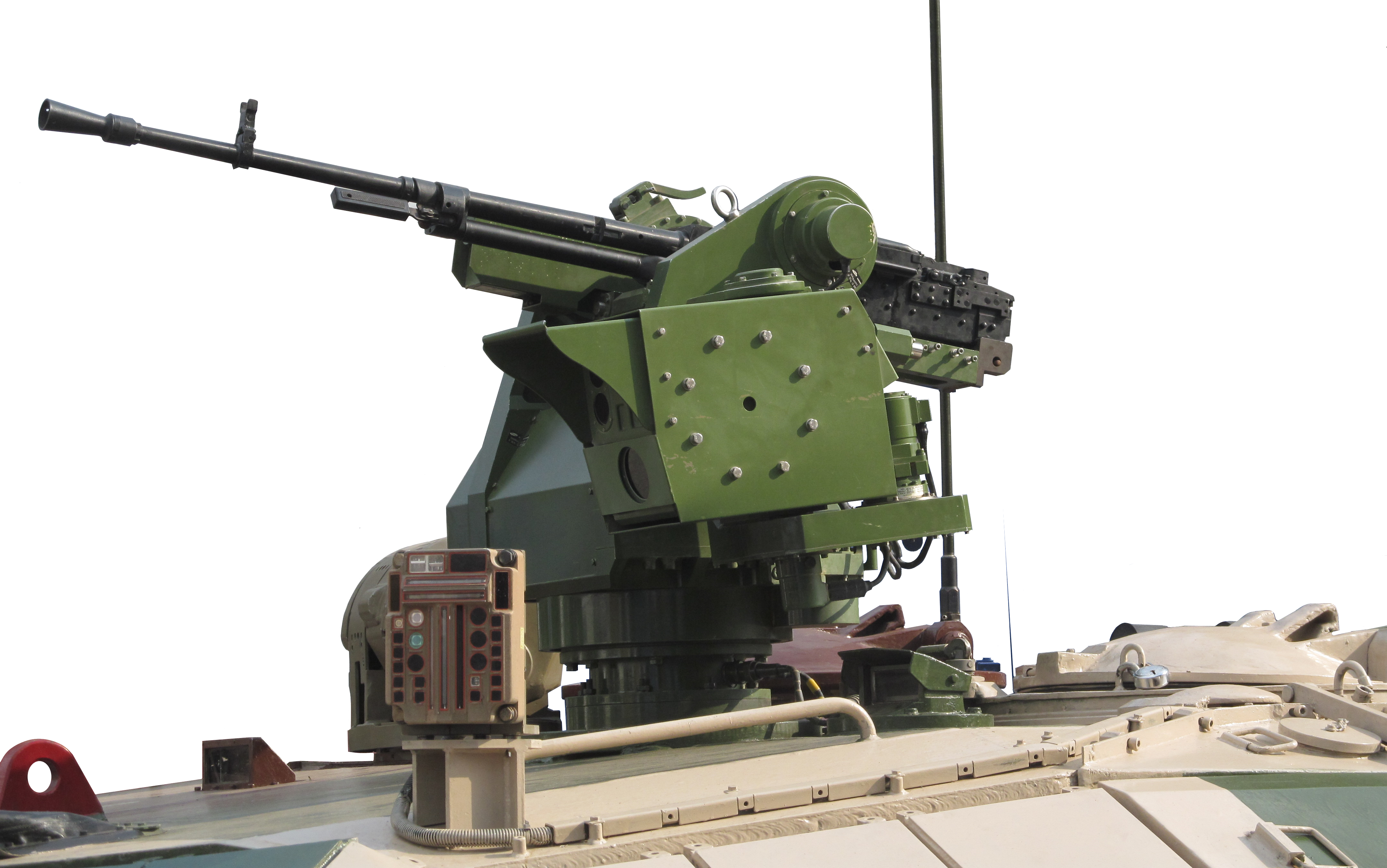
Remote controlled weapon station on Arjun Mk1A

In addition to the main gun, the Arjun has two machine guns:

1. A 12.7 mm NSV heavy machine gun mounted in front of the gunner's hatch for engaging armoured vehicles, low flying aircraft and attack helicopters. In the Arjun MK1 it is operated manually while in Mk1A it has been replaced with a remotely operated gun turret which can be operated from inside the tank without exposing personnel to the hostile battlefield. The MKII variant has a RCWS made by Bharat Electronics Ltd (BEL).
2. A 7.62 mm machine gun in a coaxial weapon mount.

=== Fire control and sights ===
The Arjun tanks are equipped with an indigenous fire control system developed by BEL, the Integrated Fire Control System (IFCS). The IFCS consists of a digital ballistic computer which cues information from microprocessor-based sensors for wind-speed, tilt angle, target range, vehicle speed etc., to provide an accurate firing solution. The Arjun's IFCS is designed for quick target acquisition with "first round-first hit probability" during day and night and in all weather conditions. The Arjun has a gun control system integrated into its 120 mm rifled gun which electro-hydraulically stabilises the gun to retain aim accuracy irrespective of the terrain disturbances (while moving). The two axis-stabilised gun control system interfaced with the IFCS offers high accuracy and slewing speed for engaging moving targets while on the move. The fire control system originally developed for the Arjun tank has been integrated into the Indian Army's T-90 tanks.

The Arjun gunner's main sight has an integrated laser range finder, day sight and thermal sight for day and night target recognition and engagement, and dual magnification and fibre-optic gyro based two-axis stabilisation. The sight is integrated with an automatic target tracking system developed by DRDO.

The commander's panoramic sight operates independently of the turret. It is stabilised with a fibre-optic gyro, and has an integrated laser rangefinder, day sight with dual magnification and a thermal imaging camera for day and night all-weather 360-degree surveillance. The sight is also interfaced with the ballistic computer, which enables the commander to override the gunner to select and engage targets independently. In addition to the laser rangefinder, the Arjun Mk1A variant has an integrated laser target designator linked to the SAMHO gun-launched guided missile.

=== Protection ===
==== Armour ====
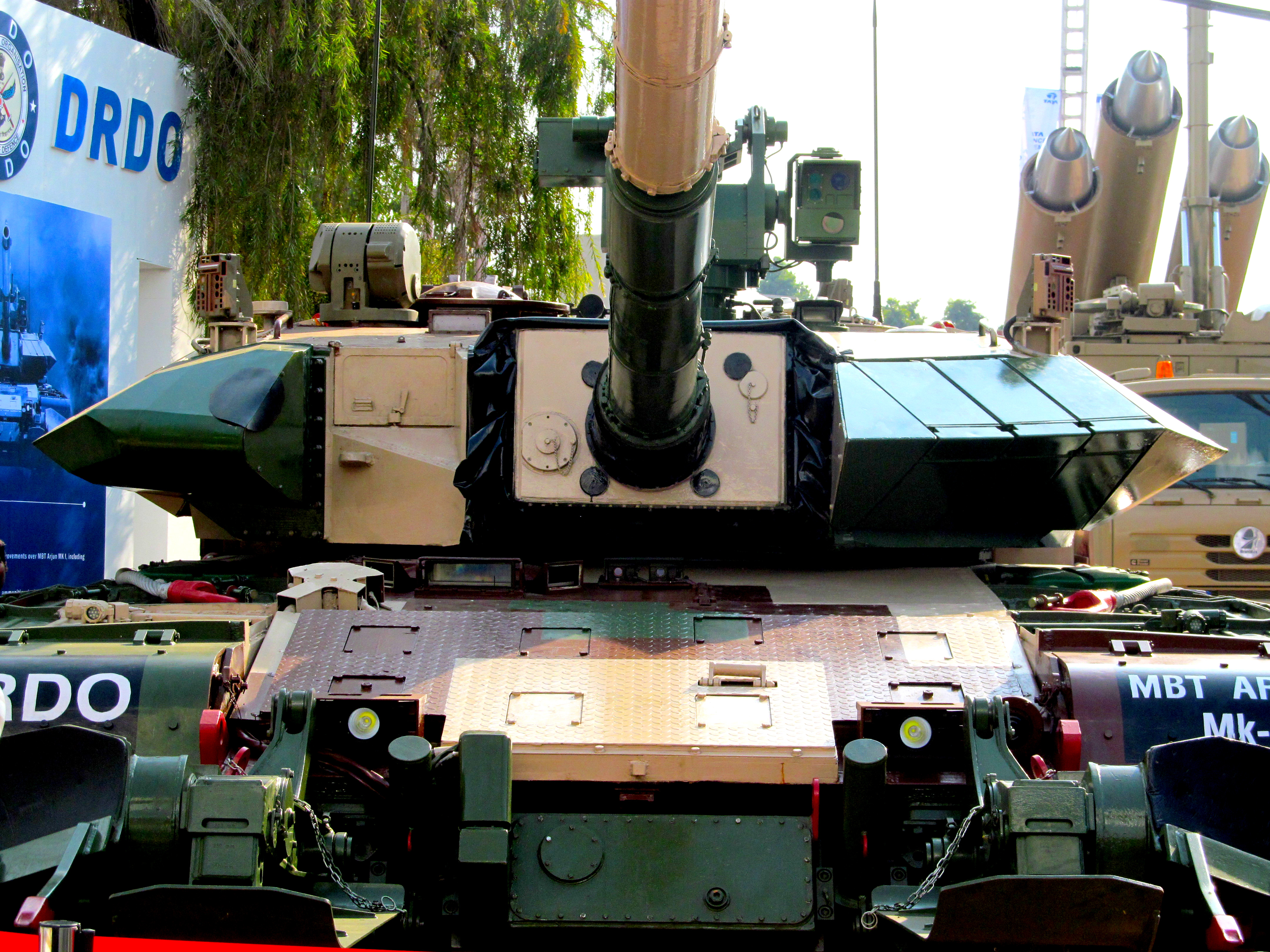
Close up view of ERA protection on hull glacis and turret of Arjun MK-1A tank

The Arjun MK1 tanks are protected by an indigenously developed armour called Kanchan armour, named after the city of Kanchanbagh, where the Defence Metallurgical Research Laboratory (DMRL) which designed and developed the armour is located. Kanchan is a composite armour that consists of ceramic tiles and composite panels sandwiched between rolled homogeneous armour (RHA) plates. Its exact composition, the material used and the manufacturing processes are kept highly secret. The armour was fielded on the Arjun after extensive evaluation trials carried out against a variety of modern anti-tank munitions, including APFSDS.

The Arjun tanks are also protected with ultra-high strength low alloy DMR-1700 steel armour plates developed by the DMRL, which offer enhanced protection against kinetic energy penetrator projectiles such as APFSDS (125 mm) rounds, over the existing RHA plates by a margin of 20 per cent and 25 per cent against 7.62 mm and 12.7 mm armour-piercing projectiles.

The latest variant Arjun, the Mk1A, has a completely redesigned turret protected with improved Kanchan armour with enhanced protection against large calibre kinetic energy projectiles, explosive reactive armour (ERA) panels (ERA MK-II) on the turret, hull glacis and the side skirt. The Mk1A also has non-explosive reactive armour (NERA) protection. The turret is redesigned to reduce its silhouette, thereby delaying detection at ranges using modern electro-optical sights.

The tank has NBC protection and an automatic fire detection and suppression system for enhanced crew protection and survival.

==== Defensive aid system ====
Passive protection is provided by a multi-purpose mobile camouflage system (MCS) developed by DRDO; it is integrated on Arjun tanks and evaluations were carried out in 2009. The Arjun also has anti-infrared/anti-thermal paints to reduce its IR signature.

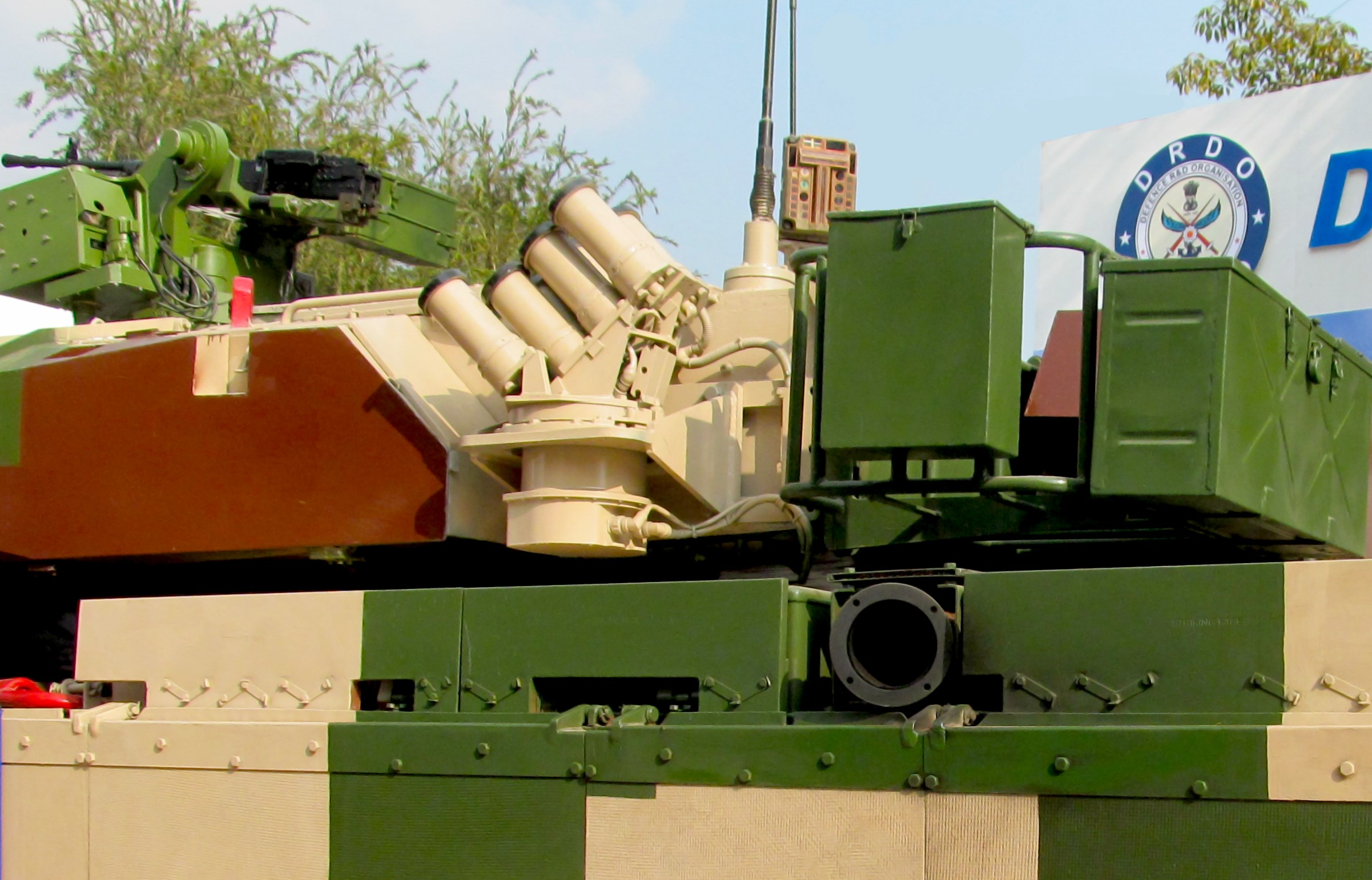
One of the four all-bearing laser warning receivers combined with IR jammer (top) and 360 degree independently rotating smoke grenade launcher (bottom). Both are part of the ALWCS, and operate autonomously

Active protection is provided by the Advanced Laser Warning Countermeasure System (ALWCS), and consists of four laser warning receivers mounted on the top of the turret to provide 360-degree protection cover. The ALWCS alerts the crew and indicates the direction of a threat when a laser rangefinder/designator, IR illuminator is pointed at the tank. The ALWCS has integrated IR jammers and aerosol based smoke grenades to confuse the anti-tank guided munitions.

The ALWCS is interfaced with the FCS of the Arjun tank, which autonomously rotates the grenade launcher in the direction of and perceived threat and fires aerosol smoke grenades. It has auto and manual modes of operation.

==== Crew safety and protection ====
The Arjun has a crew of four—commander, gunner, loader and driver. The Arjun's crew compartment is ergonomically designed for crew safety and comfort and is protected with armour and ERA. In Arjun Mk1A, the driver's safety and comfort is enhanced with roof mounted seat to protect him from Shock waves. The Arjun's crew and engine compartments are equipped with an automatic fire detection and suppression system, which detects and suppresses fire within 200 milliseconds, while ammunition rounds are stored in a containerised ammunition bin with an individual shutter with blow off panels to mitigate the hazard caused by ammunition cook off. The Arjun Mk1A variant tank has a track-width mine plough to reduce the risk of anti-tank mines; the tank also has NBC protection.

=== Mobility ===
The Arjun is a heavy main battle tank that moves on seven roadwheels on each side, supported by an indigenously developed hydropneumatic suspension system. Powered by an MTU 838 Ka 501 turbo charged 10 cylinder liquid cooled diesel engine with a rated power output of 1400 hp at 2400 rpm, the tank has a 70-kilometre (43 mi) top speed and a 40-kilometre-per-hour (25 mph) cross country speed. The Arjun tank has a maximum fuel capacity of 1,610 litres (350 imp gal; 430 US gal) and a range of 450 kilometres (280 mi).

The Arjun has a ground of clearance 0.45 metres (18 in), and can ford through 2.15-metre (7 ft 1 in) deep water without using a snorkel. During this operation, air for fuel combustion is drawn through the commander's and loader's hatches.

The latest Arjun Mk1A variant retains the 1,400 hp diesel powerplant but with a redesigned hydropneumatic suspension system and new advanced running gear system for optimal performance and efficiency. Earlier Arjun tanks were equipped with tracks supplied by the German company, Diehl, but these were later replaced with tracks supplied by Larsen & Toubro.

The Mk1A variant has a new auxiliary power unit (APU) with double power generation capacity, which allows the tank to operate in silent watch mode while the main engine is off. The use of an APU reduces the IR/thermal and acoustic signature and enhances the tank's ambush attack capability. The Arjun Mk1A has an Advanced Land Navigation System (ALNS) in addition to the GPS/inertial navigation system it retains from its predecessor, for enhanced navigation in uncharted hostile enemy territory.

In the Arjun Mk1A variant, the driver has an uncooled night-vision camera and an uncooled thermal imager with binocular vision enabling effortless driving at a reasonable speed on a pitch-black night.

==== DATRAN 1500 ====
As reported in 2010, an indigenous engine, capable of providing a power output of 1,500 hp (1,100 kW) was to be developed for DRDO's Future Main Battle Tank (FMBT) programme. A national team had been formed, including members from academia, the user, industry, and the DRDO. The prototype would be ready by 4-5 yrs. Another project to develop the automatic transmission system for the tank was being launched. The indigenous engine, along with the transmission, will collectively form the Bharat Power Pack which will meet the FMBT's mobility requirements.

As of February 2024, reports suggest the German-origin engine of Arjun Mk1A variant will be replaced by the DATRAN 1500 engine, which is being developed by DRDO and is currently under testing phase. This is because of the sudden closure of MTU Friedrichshafen's supply chain, which is expected to take four years more to restart.

The DATRAN 1500 engine had its first test in 2023. On 20 March 2024, the prototype engine was again successfully tested at BEML's Engine Division Mysuru facility. The engine has electronic control, a self-cleaning air filter, CRDi fuel injection system, and electronic warning control. In addition, the engine has a high power-to-weight ratio and can run in a variety of harsh environments, such as over 5,000 m (16,000 ft) above mean sea level, in sub-zero temperature of −40 °C, and up to +55 °C in a hot desert environment. A total of 20 prototypes of the engines, with an emphasis on technology stabilization, will be produced in 2024 and put through additional testing to evaluate their performance, robustness, and dependability. The project is expected to be completed by the middle of 2025.

==== Integrated Automotive Vetronics System ====
Developed by CVRDE, the Integrated Automotive Vetronics System (IAVS) is a health monitoring system developed for tanks and armoured fighting vehicles operated by the Indian Army. The IAVS is a "system of systems" which integrates sensors and subsystems on board the Arjun to make the tank an efficient fighting machine. The IAVS monitors the data bus that interlaces the hull and turret subsystems, analyses automotive performance and alerts the crew when maintenance is due.

The system also integrates the driver's enhanced sight system and provides automated driving. The tank crew interacts with the system through an integrated touch screen display. Its trials were successfully completed in August 2015 during which the prototype covered 430 kilometres (270 mi) under harsh weather conditions.

== Operational history ==
Since its induction into service, the Arjun has participated in a number of wargames carried out by the Indian Army. In 2010, the first two armoured regiments equipped with Arjun tanks participated in the Army's annual winter exercise. The same year, the Indian Army carried out a comparative trial pitting the newly inducted Arjun MK1 tanks against the imported T-90 tanks. The trial was carried out in four phases from 19 February 2010 to 12 March 2010, checking the subsystem performance, medium fording capability, automotive run and firing trials. In March 2010, it was reported that the Arjun had outperformed the T-90 in terms of both firepower and mobility.

During the comparative trials, the Arjun reportedly demonstrated its ability to target and engage moving targets while moving in the opposite direction. In addition, it demonstrated a zero water ingress medium fording capability, multiple target discrimination, and effortless automotive performance achieved even in the heavy dunal desert terrain.

In 2013, the Indian Army announced it would not purchase any additional vehicles above the 124 Arjuns that had already been ordered. In 2014, a report from the Comptroller and Auditor General of India noted that some parameters of the 2010 comparative trials had been relaxed for the T-90 tanks.

== Variants ==
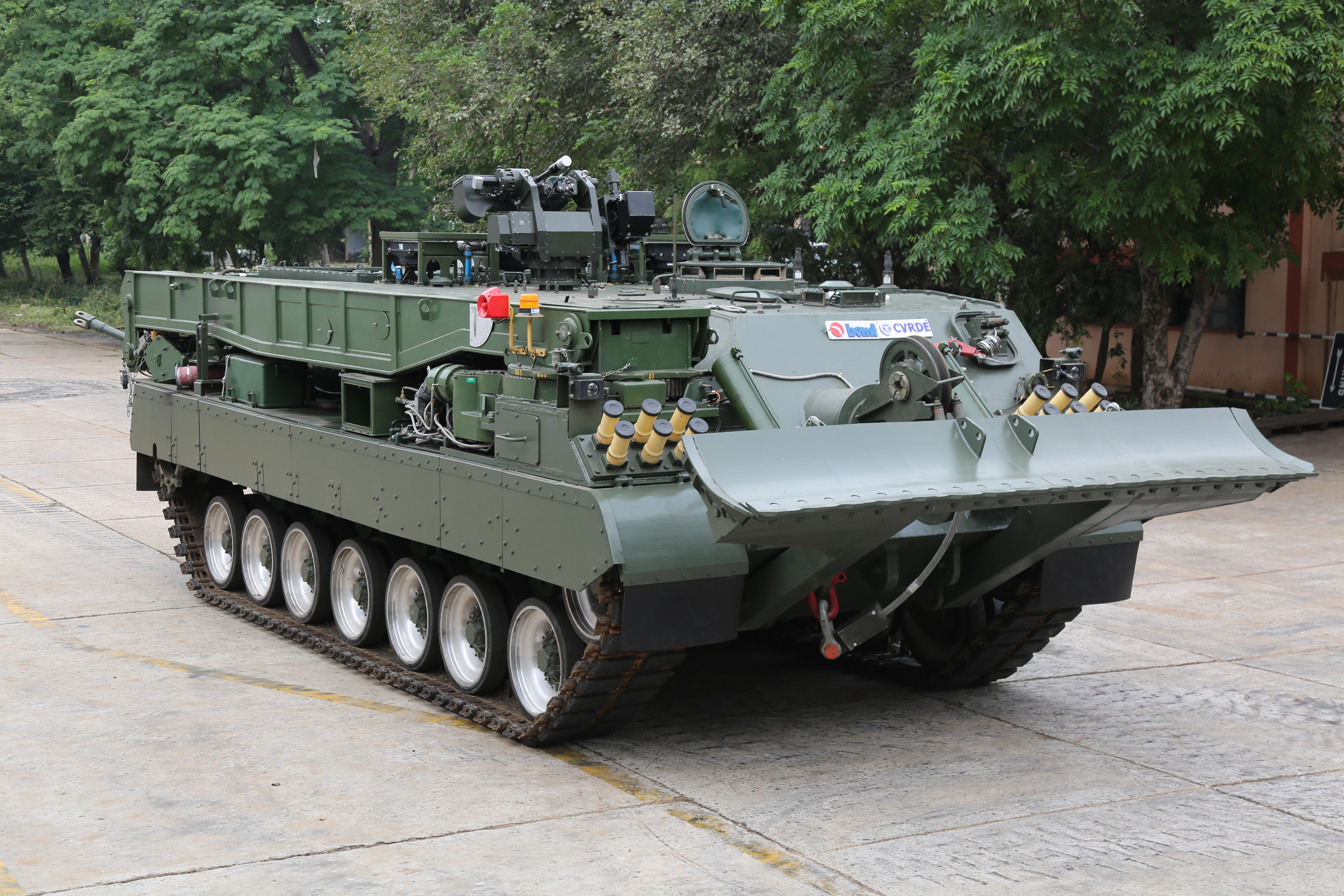
Arjun ARRV

- Arjun MK1: First production variant Arjun tank similar to the Leopard 2A4, entered service with the Indian Army in 2004. It is a 58.5 ton main battle tank equipped with Kanchan composite armour, a 120 mm rifled gun and an indigenous FCS with digital ballistic computer. It has a laser warning receiver based active protection system.
- Bhim SPH: A 155 mm self-propelled howitzer variant of the Arjun has been prototyped by fitting the South African Denel T6 turret, which comes with the G5 howitzer to the Arjun chassis. This project has been cancelled as Denel has become embroiled in a corruption scandal in India.
- Arjun Catapult System: A 130 mm Catapult howitzer system based on the Arjun chassis. The trials were concluded successfully, and the Indian Army was expected to place an order for 40 systems.

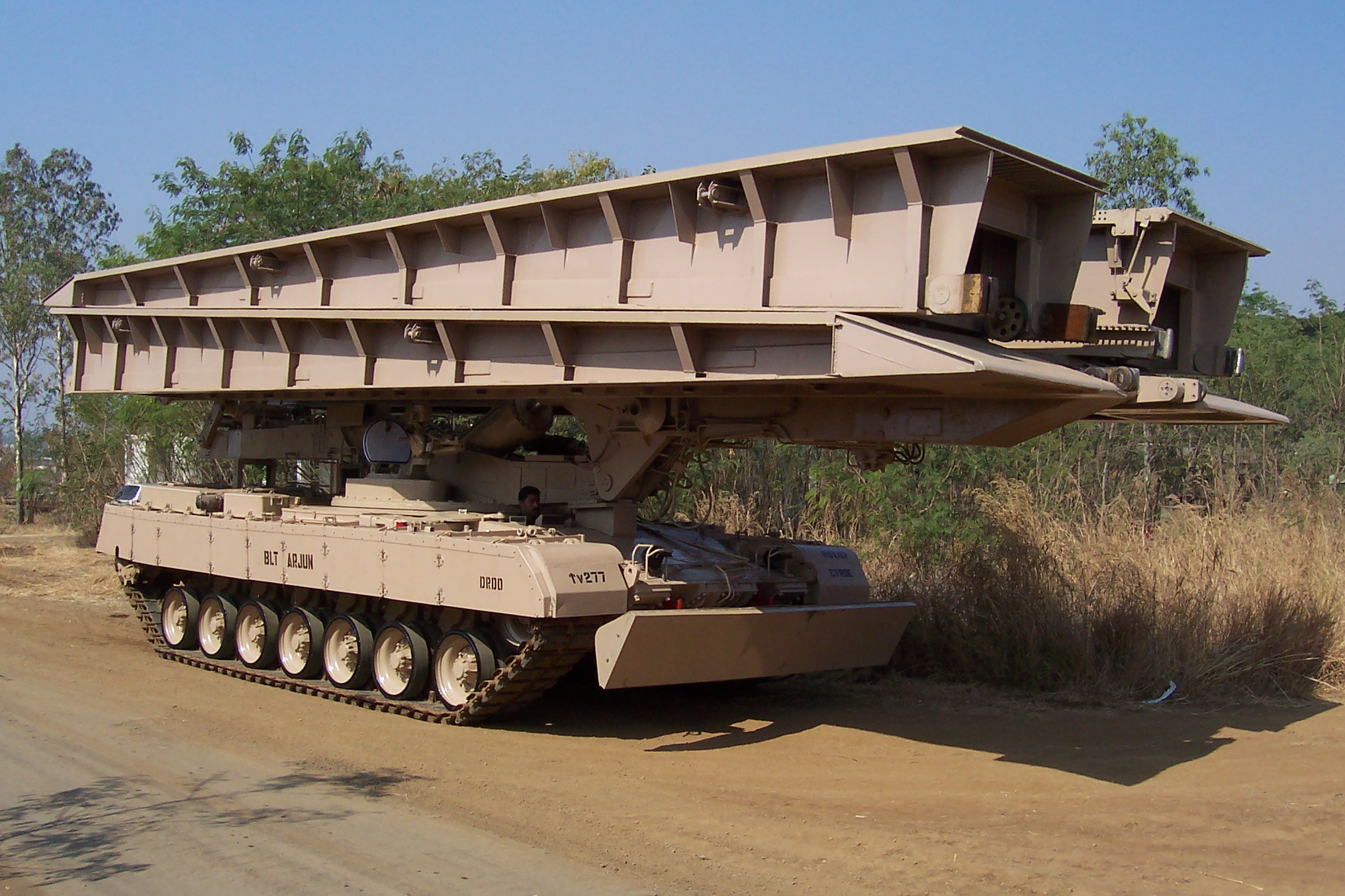
Bridge Layer Tank (BLT) Arjun

- Bridge Layer Tank (BLT) based on the Arjun chassis developed by the CVRDE. It uses the "scissors type" of bridge laying method, which does not raise the bridge high up into the air, reducing its visibility to hostile forces.
- Arjun ARRV: Armoured recovery and repair vehicle based on the Arjun chassis developed by CVRDE and BEML, for supporting Arjun tank regiments in battlefield.
- Tank EX: A hybrid experimental tank prototype, coupling a T-72 chassis with an Arjun turret.

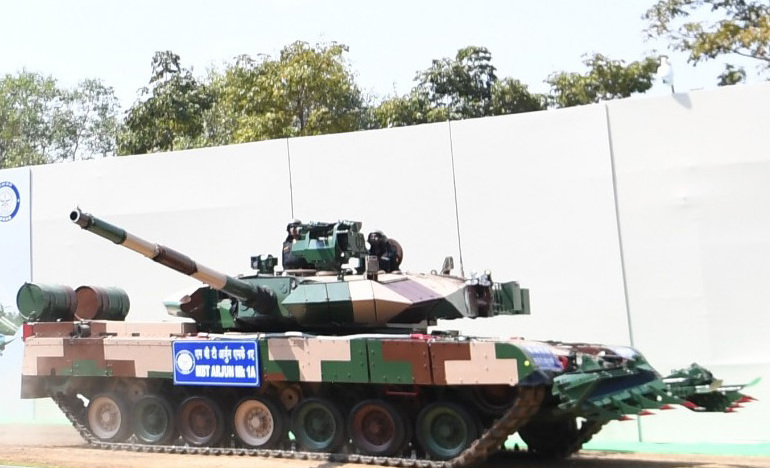
Arjun Mk1A

- Arjun Mk1A: The Mk1A (previously designated as MK2) is a new variant of Arjun tank designed to enhance firepower, mobility and survivability. It has a completely redesigned turret protected with improved Kanchan armour and ERA. The Mk1A has 89 major and minor improvements, of these 73 could be easily incorporated into the MK1 variant. Other major improvements include the addition of NERA for protection, integration of the gun-launched SAMHO ATGM, integration of the gunner's main sight with the automatic target tracking system, integration of the commander's panoramic sight (CPS MK-II) with the laser rangefinder and dual magnification day sight, the addition of an uncooled thermal sight interfaced with the FCS for hunter-killer capability, the addition of an uncooled sight system with binocular vision for the driver, a remote controlled weapon station, a track width mine plough, a containerized ammunition bin with individual shutter (CABIS) for crew safety, an advanced land navigation system, a new auxiliary power unit with double power generation capacity, and a redesigned hydropneumatic suspension system with new advanced running gear system (ARGS) to enhance agility. The Arjun Mk1A has considerably more indigenous content than previous variant.
- Unmanned ground vehicle variant planned for production.

=== FMBT ===
The Future Main Battle Tank (FMBT) is a next-generation main battle tank being developed by the Combat Vehicles Research and Development Establishment (CVRDE) of the Defence Research and Development Organisation (DRDO) for the Indian Army. The FMBT design is expected to replace the older generation MBTs of the Indian Army Armoured Corps from 2030 onwards. The tank is a further development of the previous generation Arjun main battle tanks of the Army.

== Specifications ==
Arjun specifications
	Arjun MK1	Arjun Mk1A
Designer	Combat Vehicles Research and Development Establishment (CVRDE)	
Manufacturer	Heavy Vehicles Factory (HVF)	
Produced	2004–2012	2021 –
Operator	Indian Army	
Technical details
Length	10.6 m (35 ft) (with gun forward)	
Width	3.9 m (13 ft)	
Height	2.32 m (7 ft 7 in) (turret roof) 3.03 m (9.9 ft) (with gun mount)	
Weight	58.5 t (57.6 long tons; 64.5 short tons)	68 t (67 long tons; 75 short tons)
Engine	1400 hp MTU 838 Ka 501 turbo charged diesel engine	1500 hp DATRAN V12 turbocharged diesel engine
Power/weight	24:1 hp/ton	
Range	450 km (280 mi)	
Max.speed	70 km (43 mi) /h	58 km (36 mi) /h
Suspension	Hydropneumatic suspension	
Crew	4 (commander, gunner, loader, driver)	
Armament
Primary	120 mm rifled gun with recoil system	
Ammunition	APFSDS (MK-I & MK-II), HEAT, HESH, PCB, TB, SAMHO	
Secondary	1 × 12.7 mm HCB 1 × MAG 7.62 mm Tk 715 A	1 × 12.7 mm remotely operated gun turret 1 × MAG 7.62 mm Tk 715 A
Protection
Armour	Kanchan composite modular armour	Improved Kanchan, ERA, NERA
Passive	Multi-spectral mobile camouflage, anti-infrared/anti-thermal paint.	
Active	Advanced Laser Warning Countermeasure System (ALWCS) with IR jammer.	
	12 × 81 mm Anti-thermal Anti-laser Smoke Grenade	16 × 81 mm Anti-thermal Anti-laser Smoke Grenade

== Operators ==
- India
  - Indian Army
    - 124 Arjun MK1 tanks in service.
    - 2 Mk1A (prototypes) in service, with 118 Mk1A tanks on order. On 23 September 2021, the Indian Army signed a contract for 118 Arjun Mk.1As with the first five due to be delivered within 30 months.
    - 40 130 mm M-46 Catapults based on Arjun chassis.

=== Failed contracts ===
- Bahrain: Bahrain was in talks with India for the procurement of Arjun Mk II, which was reported in March 2022.
- Colombia: Colombia expressed interest to purchase the Arjun in 2009.

== See also ==
- List of main battle tanks by generation
