= Tank EX =

Tank Ex/Karna Tank
- Three-quarter front view of a Tank Ex in parade
- Type: Main battle tank
- Place of origin: India

Production history
- Designer: Defence Research and Development Organisation
- Manufacturer: Heavy Vehicles Factory
- No. built: 8 prototypes

Specifications
- Mass: 47 tonnes (52 short tons; 46 long tons)
- Length: 9.19 m (30 ft 2 in)
- Width: 3.37 m (11 ft 1 in)
- Height: 2.93 m (9 ft 7 in)
- Crew: 4 (Commander, Gunner, Loader and Driver)
- Armor: Composite
- Main armament: 120 mm tank gun LAHAT ATGM
- Secondary armament: 12.7 mm AA MG; 7.62 mm coaxial MG
- Engine: Diesel; 1,000 hp (700 kW) power plant (as on the Combat Improved T-72)
- Power/weight: 21 hp (16 kW)/ton
- Suspension: Hydropneumatic
- Operational range: 480 km (300 mi)
- Maximum speed: 60 km/h (37 mph) (road); 40 km/h (25 mph) (cross country)

Tank Ex, or Karna Tank, was the code name of the prototype main battle tank developed by India's Defence Research and Development Organisation (DRDO) in 2002. Tank ex is based on existing Arjun and Ajeya tank. This MBT uses turret and weapon systems of the Arjun MBT and chassis of the T-72 M1 (Ajeya) MBT. Tank Ex was developed as an attempt to modernise India's existing Ajeya tanks, using technology derived from the development of the Arjun MBT. It was named after Karna, the chief protagonist of the Indian epic The Mahabharata. It underwent six months of trials, but was subsequently rejected by the Indian Army. A total of eight Tank Ex prototypes were built.

== History ==
The Tank Ex MBT uses the chassis of the T-72M1 (Ajeya) and the turret and weapon system of the Arjun. It was developed in 2002 as a private venture and was intended to provide a solution for upgrading the Indian Army's ageing T-72M1 fleet. It was rejected by the Indian Army after eight prototypes and six months of trials.

On July 5, 2008, Gen. Dalip Bhardwaj, the Indian Army's Director General of Mechanised forces (DGMF), declared that the army had rejected Tank Ex. This was part of an announcement that there would be no further orders for Arjun tanks, and that the military would be inviting participants from various countries to discuss future tank developments.

== Specifications ==
Weighing in at 47 tons, the Tank Ex is heavier than the T-72M1 (41 tons) and much lighter than the Arjun MBT, (58.4 tons). It has a 1,000 hp (700 kW) power plant giving a power-to-weight ratio of 21 hp (16 kW)/ton for a total weight of 47 tons. This represents an improvement over the T-72M1's 20 hp (15 kW)/ton, with a weight of 41 tons and a 780 hp (582 kW) power plant. The Tank Ex utilises the Arjun MBT's 120 mm rifled gun firing unitary APFSDS and HESH semi combustible cartridge case ammunition. A total of 32 rounds are carried, as compared with 39 in the Arjun and 45 two piece rounds in the T-72. A global positioning system is provided for accurate navigation. This is a feature common to both the Arjun MBT and the Combat Improved Ajeya.

The Tank Ex utilises the "Kanchan" composite armour, especially over its frontal arc (turret as well as glacis), giving it protection against both Kinetic and HEAT rounds. The usage of the Arjun turret design indicates that the Tank Ex may also have its "ready" ammunition stored in the bustle (as in the Arjun), separated from the crew and provided with blow-off panels. This would be a significant protective feature comparable with Western design practices. The Tank Ex retains the T-72's mobility, with a road speed of 60 km/h and a cross-country speed of 40 km/h. With a maximum gradient climb of 30 degrees, it remains in line with all variants of the T-72, like the T-72BM. The Tank Ex is better at trench crossing with a capability of crossing 2.6 meters as compared to the T-72M1's 2.28 metres. The Tank Ex can also climb vertical obstacles up to 0.85 metres tall. The tank's shallow fording capabilities are quoted as 1.2 metres. The Tank Ex should also have the capability to fire the Israeli LAHAT missile from its gun-barrel, like the Arjun. The tank can carry upto 32 rounds of ammunition and uses the fire control systems from the Arjun. The main gun has a depression of +16.5 deg/-10 deg. Secondary arnaments include 81mm grenade launchers, an NSVT and a co-axial PKT gun. The Tank features the Kanchan armour and is also equipped with armour blow-out panels, as well as full NBC protection.
