= Defence Metallurgical Research Laboratory =

Indian research laboratory

- Location: Kanchanbagh, Hyderabad - 500 058, Hyderabad, Telangana, India
- Operating agency: Defence Research and Development Organisation

Defence Metallurgical Research Laboratory (DMRL) is a research laboratory of the Defence Research and Development Organisation (DRDO). Located in Defence Research Complex, Kanchanbagh, Hyderabad. It is responsible for the development and manufacture of complex metals and materials required for modern warfare and weapon systems.

== History ==
As with all the labs of DRDO, Defence Metallurgical Research Laboratory (DMRL) was an extension out of the Technical Development Establishment (Metals) which was earlier called the Inspectorate of Metals and Steel situated at Ishapore (near Kolkata). DMRL was shifted to Hyderabad in 1963. Since then, it has developed competence in the areas of powder metallurgy based fabrication and development of alloys, armor and rocket motor steel, aerospace light alloys, and magnetic materials. The formation of other entities such as the Mishra Dhatu Nigam Ltd., High Energy Projectile Factory (formerly Heavy Alloy Penetrator Project), Composites Production Centre, Non-Ferrous Technology Development Centre, and the Advanced Research Centre International have followed the establishment of DMRL. The DMRL is also involved in R&D efforts to develop futuristic materials to provide advanced technology options.

== Projects and products ==
- DMR 1700 ultra-high-strength steel with the toughness stronger than 250 maraging steel but cost is 60% lower; this steel has been used to build rocket motor casings for the Akash surface-to-air missiles.
- DMR SN 742 is a nickel based superalloy used in turbine rotors and compressor and optimized for manufacturing, also cheaper compared to other alternatives.
- DMR 249A is a low carbon micro-alloyed grade of steel with stringent toughness requirement at sub-zero temperature.grade was having the specified gas contents of hydrogen <2 ppm in final product for the avoidance of detrimental phenomenon like “Hair Line Cracks”. So the Hydrogen content of liquid steel was to be less than 3 ppm and this demand vacuum treatment of the steel.
- GTM-900 titanium alloy, DMRL collaborated with NAL to develop this alpha-beta titanium alloy for aerospace applications, This alloy has been engineered to provide high strength, creep resistance, and stability under high temperatures.
- TITAN 26A and TITAN 29A are high-temperature titanium alloys developed by DMRL and MIDHANI, they are used for manufacturing critical components like compressor discs, blades, and shafts for engines, including those for Adour (Jaguar aircraft) and Kaveri aircraft engines.
- Ultra light Mg-Li alloy, In the mid-1980s, a research programme was initiated at DMRL, Mg-Li-AI alloys were made by mixing molten magnesium and aluminium-magnesium master alloy in a mild steel crucible at around 1023 K and pouring over molten lithium, separately melted in a stainless steel crucible and kept at around 573 K. The melt was then chill-cast in a mild steel mould. Interest was shown by Lockheed Company, USA for obtaining magnesium-lithium alloy sheets from DMRL. Wrought products (plates/sheets) of magnesium-lithium alloy have been supplied to ISAC, Bangalore and are being used in their INSAT-2 programme.
- Jackal steel is an advanced grade high strength low alloy steel, The technology of Jackal steel has been passed on to Steel Authority of India Limited (SAIL) and Mishra Dhatu Nigam (MIDHANI) for its bulk production.
- DMRL has developed technologies for large scale production of titanium, magnesium metals and Mg-Ti alloys.
- DMRL has developed indigenous titanium sponge making process and transferred technology to KMML in Titanium Sponge Plant.
- Heavy alloy pre-fragments for Prithvi missile warheads developed for use against aerial targets.
- Oxygen-free copper for the Nag anti-tank guided missile sheets.
- Special magnetic materials such as samarium-cobalt ring magnets and neodymium-iron-boron magnets in collaboration with the Vikram Sarabhai Space Centre for applications in the space program.
- Kanchan armour for use on the Arjun tank as well as other armoured vehicles like Sarath and Abhay.
- Under DRDO-FICCI Accelerated Technology Assessment & Commercialization initiative, DMRL supplied its patented Copper-Titanium (CuTi) alloy technology for commercial application to Pahwa Metal Tech and has also granted an exclusive license to manufacture products using the technology and sell them aboard.
- High Nitrogen Steel (HNS), created by DMRL and Jindal Stainless Limited, will be used in armaments that will replace Rolled Homogenous Armour (RHA). It is corrosion resistant with reduced thickness that increases fuel and mass efficiency, has superior ballistic and blast protection, plus higher longevity. HNS has higher impact value, higher energy absorption level, which improves overall crash worthiness. It has passed multiple levels of ballistic tests in different calibers with 8-10 times higher impact protection.
- Developed high strength metastable Beta-titanium alloy, Ti-10V-2Fe-3Al on industrial scale for applications in aerospace structural forgings. Will replace traditional Ni-Cr-Mo structural steels to achieve weight reduction. The landing gear drop link is the first component forged successfully by the Aeronautical Development Agency (ADA) at Hindustan Aeronautics Limited (HAL) and has been certified for airworthiness.
- Successfully developed near isothermal forging technology for aero engines in 2021. It can help produce all the five stages of high-pressure compressors (HPC) discs out of difficult-to-deform titanium alloy using 2000 MT isothermal forge press weighing 2,000 tonnes. The technology has been transferred to MIDHANI for bulk production. DMRL has also supplied 200 HPC disc forgings for various compressor stages to HAL for fitment in Rolls-Royce Turbomeca Adour that powers the SEPECAT Jaguar and BAE Systems Hawk of Indian Air Force.
- In 2021, DMRL achieved the breakthrough in design and development of single-crystal casting technology for turbine blades. They supplied 60 high pressure turbine (HPT) blades of nickel-based super alloy to HAL for helicopter engine applications under indigenous helicopter development programme.
- Tungsten plated silica/graphite aerogel, DMRL along with BARC is developing tungsten casting technology on silica/graphite aerogel for ultra high temperature aerospace engine applications.

== Collaboration ==
DRDO (DMRL) has transferred technologies of its DMR 249A Steel Sheets & Plates for naval applications and DMR 1700 mill forms for defence applications to Arcelor Mittal Nippon Steel India for mass production.

== See also ==
- International Advanced Research Centre for Powder Metallurgy & New Materials
- National Metallurgical Laboratory
- Dipankar Banerjee
