= 43rd Armoured Regiment (India) =

Indian Army regiment

43 Armoured Regiment
- Active: 1981–present
- Country: India
- Allegiance: India
- Branch: Indian Army
- Type: Armoured Corps
- Size: Regiment
- Nickname: Charioteers
- Mottos: युध्यस्व विगतज्वरः "Yudhyasva Vigat Jwar"
- Colors: Sky Blue and Navy Blue
- Equipment: MBT Arjun

Commanders
- Colonel of the Regiment: Lieutenant General Mohit Malhotra
- Notable commanders: Lt Gen BM Kapur

Insignia
- Abbreviation: 43 Armd Regt

43 Armoured Regiment is an armoured regiment of the Indian Army.

== Formation ==
43 Armoured Regiment was raised on 1 February 1981 at Ahmednagar under the command of Lt Col (later Lt Gen) BM Kapur based on a ‘mixed class composition’ and equipped with Vijayanta tanks.

The Regiment is a part of 140 Armoured Brigade, 12 Infantry Division, XII Corps.

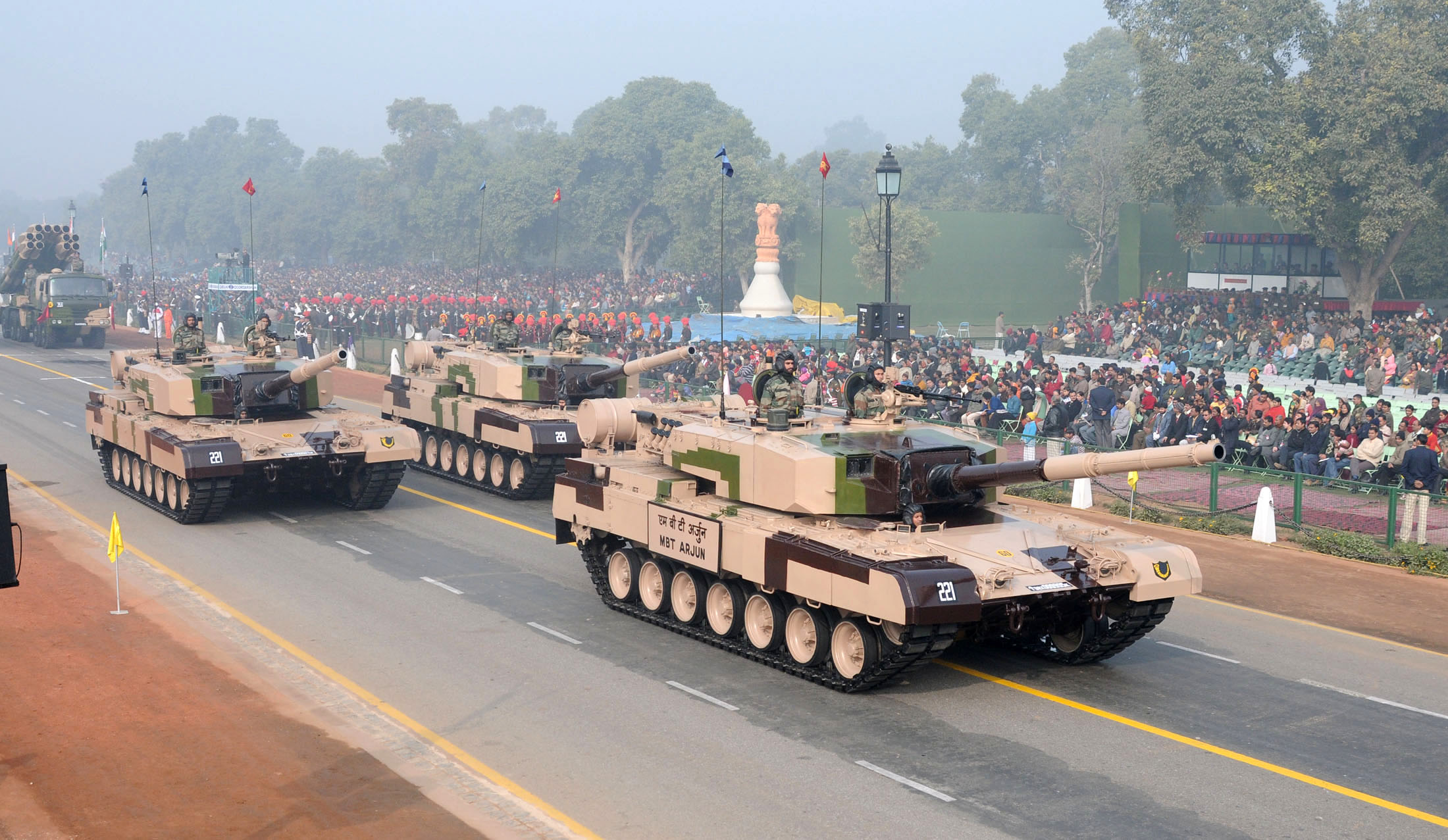
MBT Arjun of 43 Armoured Regiment at Republic Day Parade 2010

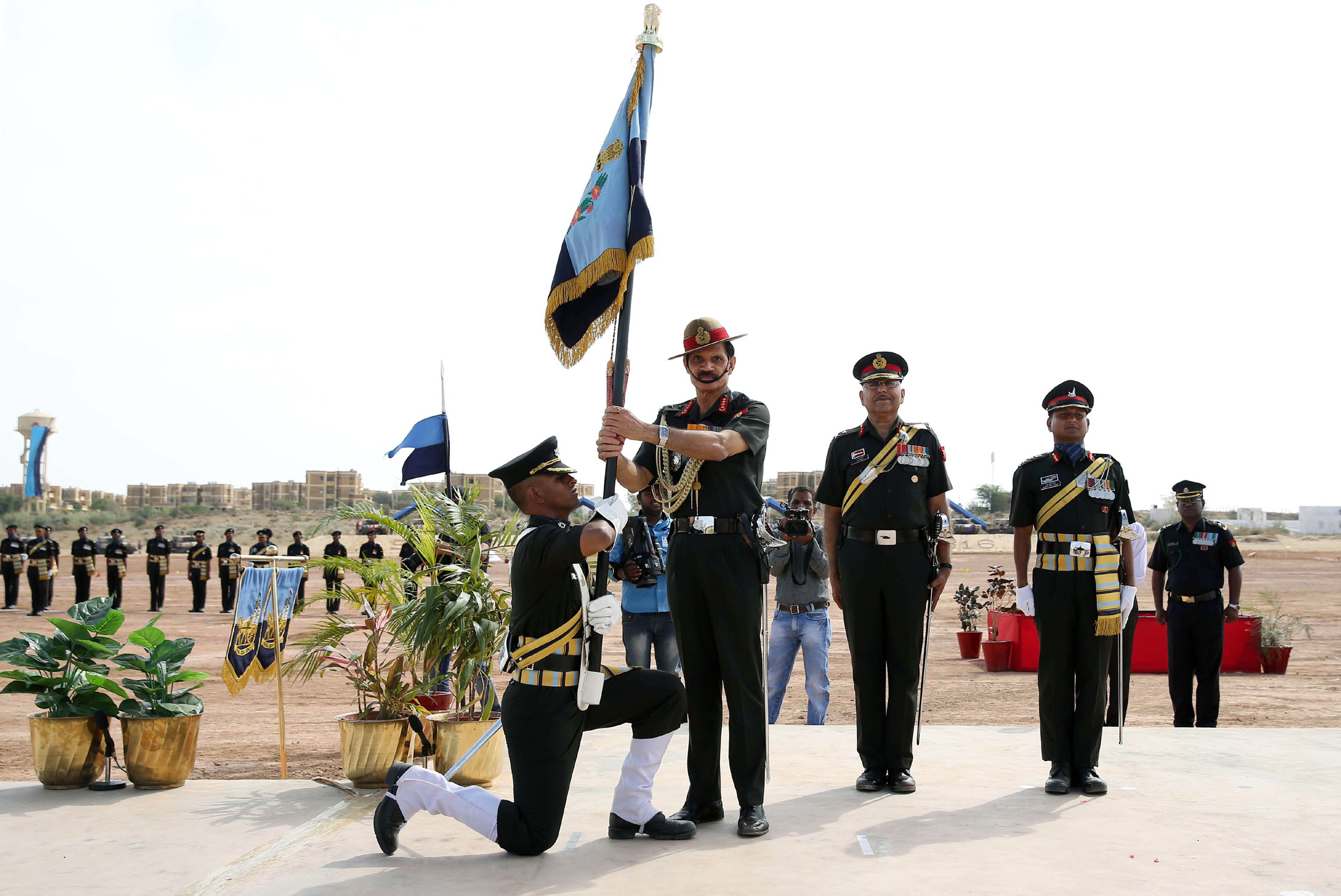
The Chief of Army Staff, General Dalbir Singh presenting the President’s ‘Standard’ to 43 Armored Regiment, at Jaisalmer Military Station, in Rajasthan on March 16, 2016

== History ==
The Regiment after its formation has served in Kapurthala, Sri Ganganagar, Ratnuchak, Pathankot, Lalgarh Jattan, Bikaner and Jaisalmer. The Regiment was presented the ‘President’s Standards’ at Jaisalmer in 2016 by General Dalbir Singh, Chief of the Army Staff, on behalf of the President of India, Mr Pranab Mukherjee. The Regiment had the honour of participating in the annual Republic Day parade on many occasions.

== Equipment ==
The Regiment had the Vijayanta tanks at the time of raising. It was handed six pre-production series of the MBT Arjun in 1993, being the first Regiment to use these tanks. From 1995, it had a mix of T-55 and Arjun tanks. In 2009, the Regiment received its full complement of Arjun Tanks.

== Operations ==
The regiment has participated in Operation Trident, Operation Vijay, Operation Rakshak and Operation Parakram.

== Regimental Insignia ==
The Regimental badge comprises a chariot being led by four horses depicting the four squadrons. The reins of the horses are steered by the Commandant, while the Adjutant stands astride holding the high the Regimental colours. The colours of the Regiment are Sky Blue (signifies limitedness) over Navy Blue (signifies fearlessness). The Regimental motto is “Yudhyasva Vigat Jwar” which means “To Fight With A Calm And Determined Mind”.
