= SAMHO =

Indian anti-tank guided missile

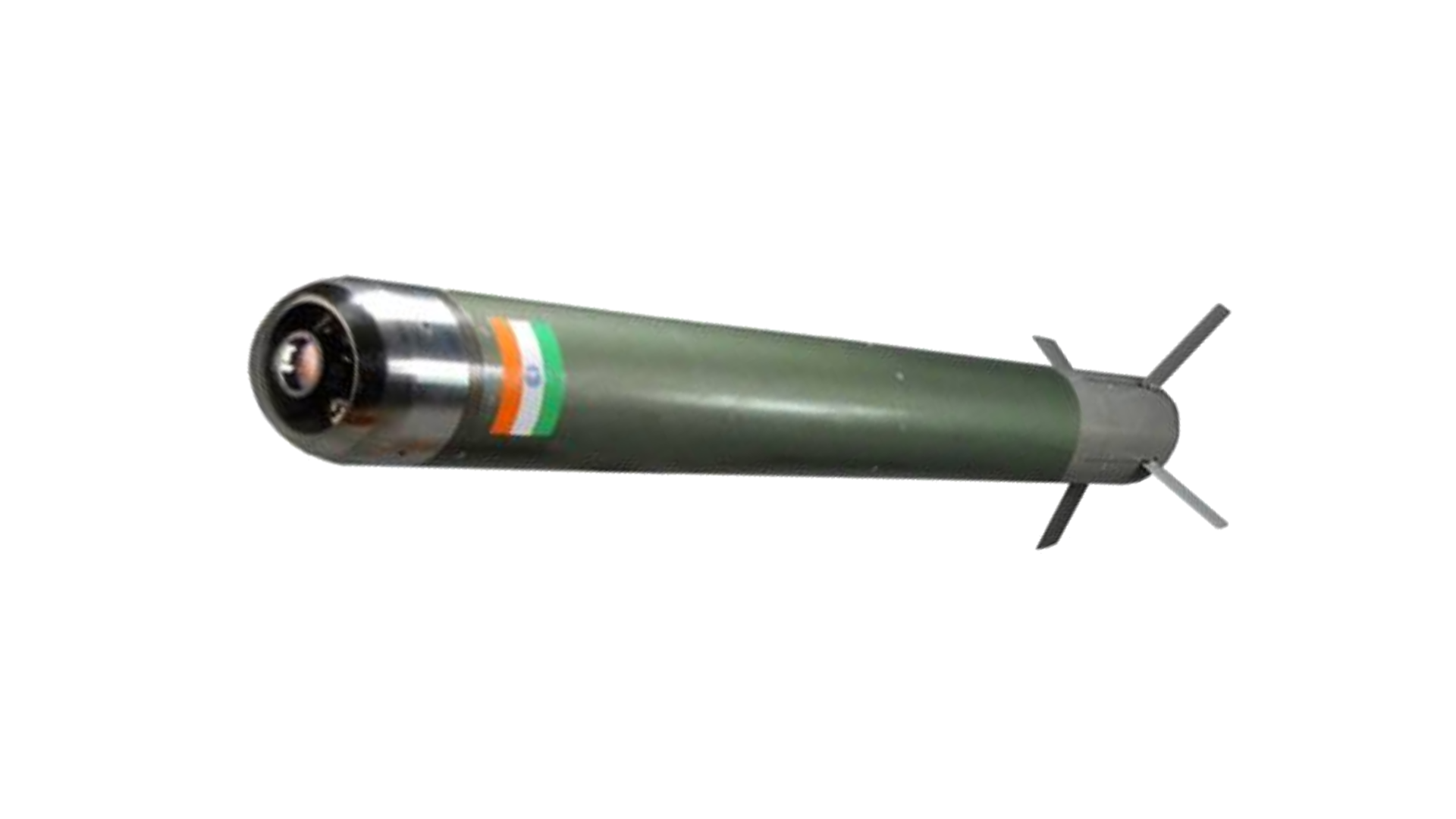
- Type: Anti-tank guided missile
- Place of origin: India

Service history
- Used by: Indian Army

Production history
- Designer: Armament Research and Development Establishment
- Designed: 2014–2023

Specifications
- Diameter: 120 mm (4.7 in)
- Warhead: Tandem HEAT
- Operational range: 1,500–5,000 m (4,900–16,400 ft)
- Guidance system: Semi-active laser homing
- Launch platform: Arjun MBT (tested); T-90 (planned)

The SAMHO (or Semi-Active Mission Homing) is an Indian gun-launched anti-tank guided missile (ATGM) developed by the Armament Research and Development Establishment (ARDE) of DRDO for the Arjun tanks of the Indian Army under the Cannon Launched Missile Development Programme (CLMDP). The SAMHO has a high-explosive anti-tank (HEAT) tandem-charge warhead designed to defeat explosive reactive armour (ERA) protection of modern armoured vehicles and tanks. The SAMHO is a multi-purpose anti-armour guided missile effective against tanks and low flying attack helicopters. Originally intended to be fired from the 120 mm rifled gun of Arjun, the DRDO plans to make it compatible with the T-90 tanks of the Indian Army, which have a 125 mm smoothbore gun.

== Development ==
The development of SAMHO gun-launched anti-tank guided missile was announced in 2014. The SAMHO missile was developed under the Cannon Launched Missile Development Programme (CLMDP) by the Armament Research and Development Establishment (ARDE) and High Energy Materials Research Laboratory (HEMRL) under Armament and Combat Engineering (ACE) cluster along with Instruments Research and Development Establishment (IRDE) of Defence Research and Development Organisation (DRDO). The missile is intended to enhance the firepower of the indigenous Arjun tanks in service with the Indian Army.

The missile has 2 modes of attack: the Top Attack Lifted Trajectory and the Direct (Flat) Trajectory. In the Top Attack mode the missile will have a range of 2–5 km (1.2–3.1 mi) enabling the missile to target the most vulnerable part of the target and avoiding most of its countermeasure systems. The Direct or Flat mode, with a range of 1.5–2 km (0.93–1.24 mi), shall be used for rapid or immediate engagements at short notice in close proximity.

On 2 February 2024, news reports suggested that DRDO has completed all trials for the missile and it is now ready for production.

== Testing ==
SAMHO missile firing from Arjun

1. The first trial occurred successfully on 22 September 2020, from an Arjun tank with an inert warhead at KK Range, Armoured Corps Centre and School (ACC&S), Ahmednagar. The missile engaged a target kept at a distance of 3 km.
2. Another successful missile firing occurred on 1 October 2020 from the same platform at the KK Range.
3. On 28 June 2022, DRDO successfully tested the missile engaging a target at minimum range at the KK Range, ACC&S, Ahmednagar. Engaging a target at minimum range by an ATGM is particularly difficult given the dimensional constraints of tank launched ATGMs. The ATGM's performance was tested for maximum ranges in the previous trials, hence, establishing the capability of the missile from minimum and maximum range.
4. On 4 August 2022, another successful test was conducted at the KK Range, engaging a target from minimum to maximum range to check performance consistency. Telemetry systems recorded the satisfactory flight performance of the missile.

== See also ==
Related development

- Nag – (India)

Comparable weapons

- LAHAT – (Israel)
- 9M119 Svir/Refleks – (Soviet Union)
- TANOK – (Turkey) (Turkey)

Related lists

- List of gun-launched missiles
- List of anti-tank missiles
