= Kanchan armour =

Indian composite vehicle armour

The Kanchan armour (literally gold in Hindi) is the name informally given to a modular composite armour developed by India. The armour got its name from Kanchan Bagh, Hyderabad, Telangana, where the Defence Metallurgical Research Laboratory (DMRL) is located.

Although the construction details of the armour remain a secret, it has been described as being made by sandwiching composite panels between rolled homogeneous armour (RHA). The number of layers may vary based on the user requirements. This armour is able to defeat armour-piercing discarding sabot (APDS) and high-explosive anti-tank warhead (HEAT) rounds and is known to defeat armour-piercing fin-stabilized discarding sabot (APFSDS).

This armour is lightweight and compact. A new honeycomb structure design of non-explosive and non-energetic reactive armour (NERA) is reportedly being tested on Arjun tanks.

== History ==
During development in the 1980s, Kanchan armour defeated a 106 mm recoilless rifle which was tried on the Arjun Tank. During trials in 2000, the armour was able to withstand hits from T-72 tank at point blank range, and defeated all available high-explosive squash head (HESH) and APFSDS rounds, which included Israeli APFSDS rounds.

The Kanchan was also used on Vijayanta tanks prior to retirement.

== Protection ==
Upon impact of a projectile, the armour will — ideally — prevent penetration via compression and decompression methods. As the projectile hits the armour, it faces compression because of the RHA, and then it faces decompression because of the composite. When the projectile passes through several such sandwiched layers, it breaks up those projectiles.

== Composition ==
In the 1980s the Kanchan composite had a composition of ceramic, aluminium oxide, fibreglass and some other such materials mixed. The Kanchan composite tried out had two thicknesses, i.e. a 350 millimetres (14 in) plate and a 315 millimetres (12.4 in) plate. However these two plates had the same weight as a 120 millimetres (4.7 in) RHA. Hence it is said that Kanchan armour is more volume at same weight. Anti-tank munitions have problems in penetrating such materials.

Kanchan armour composition has undergone massive changes since the 1980s. The volume of the RHA has been reduced to lesser mass because of better metallurgy. The composite has evolved too and it does not use the 1980s technology any more.
