= Lab Quarters =

Neighbourhood in Hyderabad, Telangana, India

Lab Quarters, also known as DRDO Township and Kanchanbagh, is a neighbourhood in Old City, Hyderabad, in the southern Indian state of Telangana. It is located near the headquarters of Bharat Dynamics Limited, which manufactures missile systems. It accommodates employees of the Defence Laboratories of the Defence Research and Development Organisation (DRDO).

Lab Quarters is one of the largest colonies in Hyderabad, comparable to those of Bharat Heavy Electricals Limited and Kukatpally Housing Board. It is well connected with the city, with the Midhani depot being just adjacent to it. It is close to the Santosh Nagar colony and Babanagar area.

The Central Government Health Scheme dispensary, Owaisi Hospital and Apollo DRDO hospitals are located nearby. The main commercial places are the shopping complex, community hall, parks and mess (general and for officers). Educational institutions in Lab Quarters include the Defence Laboratories school and the Kendriya Vidyalaya Kanchanbagh, with the latter being managed by the all-India Kendriya Vidyalaya Sangathan and financed by DRDO Laboratories. The township has several grounds, the largest of which is the one at the Kendriya Vidyalaya. There is a temple in the township. The township has a helipad, used for the arrival of dignitaries.

President A. P. J. Abdul Kalam lived in the township. He served as director of the Defence Research and Development Laboratory, which has since been renamed in his memory.
