= Vetronics =

Technological designation

Vetronics, a portmanteau of vehicle and electronics, is a technological designation used extensively in the military domain. The term also has limited usage in other contexts and in company branding, particularly in the veterinary and medical domains. It is the vehicular equivalent of avionics.
