= LAHAT =

Israel made anti-tank guided missile

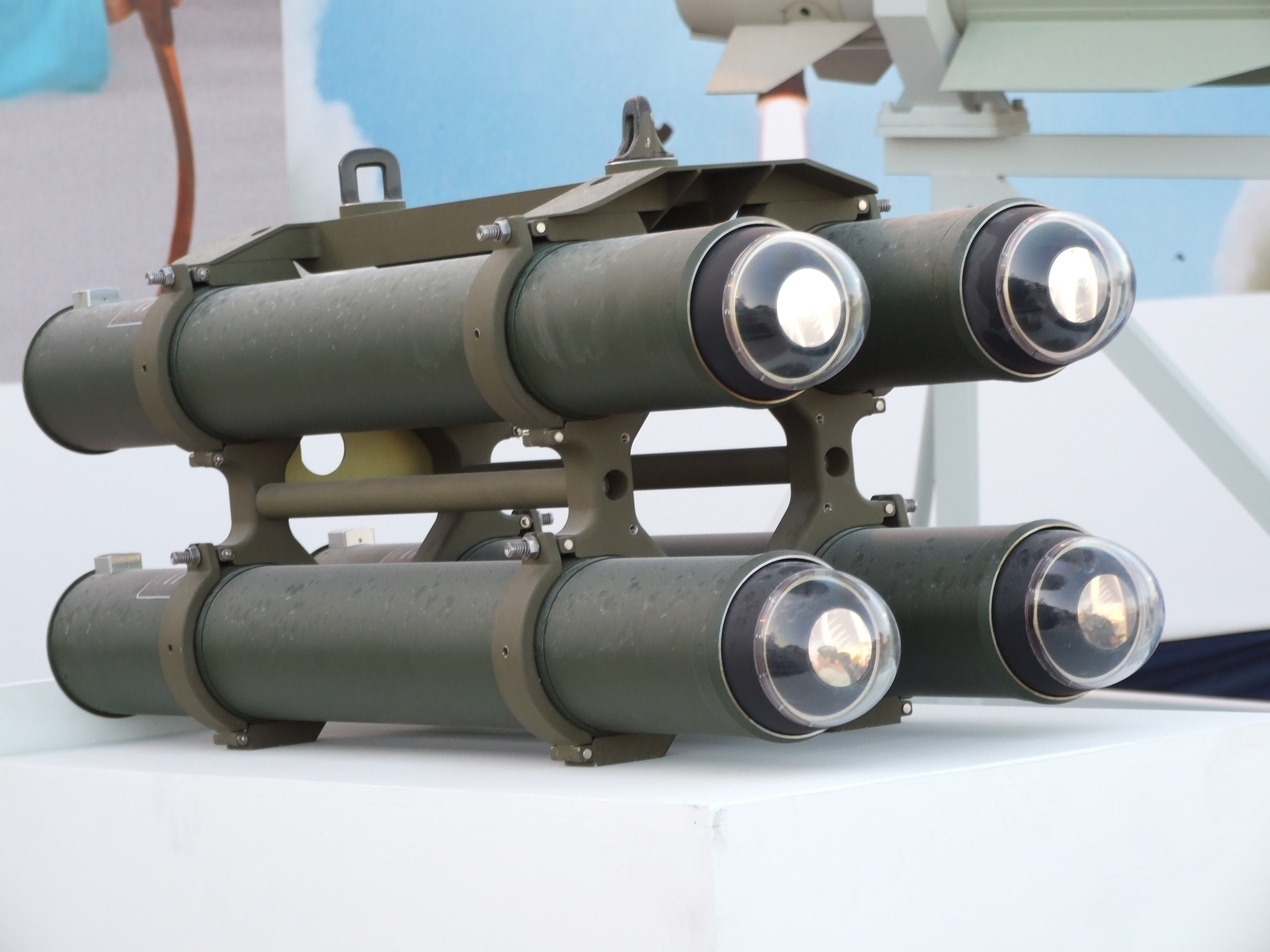
- LAHAT ATGM quad pack for helicopters
- Type: ATGM
- Place of origin: Israel

Service history
- In service: 1991–present

Production history
- Manufacturer: Israel Aerospace Industries
- Unit cost: $25,000 (1999)

Specifications
- Mass: 13 kg (28.7 lb)
- Length: 975 mm (38.4 in)
- Diameter: 105 mm (4.1 in)
- Warhead: Tandem HEAT
- Warhead weight: 4.5 kg (9.9 lb)
- Operational range: 6,000–8,000 m (6,600–8,700 yd) ground launched 8,000–13,000 m (8,700–14,200 yd) air launched
- Maximum speed: 285–300 m/s (940–980 ft/s)
- Guidance system: Semi-active laser homing
- Launch platform: 105–120 mm smoothbore rotary-wing aircraft

The LAHAT (laser homing attack or laser homing anti-tank, also a Hebrew word for incandescence) is a third generation semi-active laser homing low-weight anti-tank guided missile developed since 1991 and manufactured by Israel Aerospace Industries. It has a tandem-charge high-explosive anti-tank (HEAT) warhead. It was designed primarily to be fired by Merkava tanks' 105 mm and 120 mm tank guns, though it matches all types of 105 mm and 120 mm guns, including low recoil guns and low-weight guns of military armoured cars.

It is also suitable for patrol ships, possibly modified for 105–106 mm recoilless rifles, unmanned aerial vehicles (UAVs), high mobility multipurpose wheeled vehicles (HMMWVs), and self-propelled anti-aircraft weapons (or guns, SPAAGs). Unlike other tank rounds, the LAHAT does not need a tank gun for operation.

== Overview ==
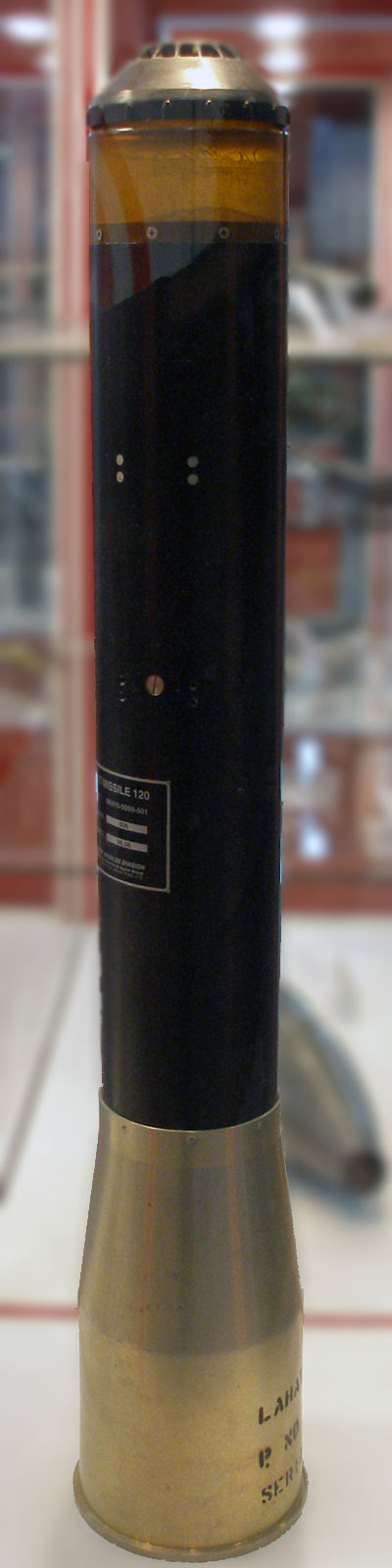
One LAHAT

The LAHAT is designed to achieve a 95 percent probability of kill under most conditions. It has a semi-active laser guidance system, capable of both direct and indirect laser designation—the target can be laser-designated by the launching platform (e.g. firing tank) or other platform (e.g. another tank, helicopter, UAV, or forward scouting team), requiring minimal exposure in the firing position. With a low launch signature, the missile's trajectory can be set to match either top attack (armoured fighting vehicle, warship) or direct attack (helicopter gunship) engagements.

The LAHAT missile has a range of up to 8,000 m (5.0 mi) when launched from a ground platform, and up to 13,000 m (8.1 mi) when deployed from high elevation. The time of flight to a target at 4,000 m (2.5 mi) is 14 seconds and the missile hits the target at an accuracy of 0.7 m (2.3 ft) circular error probable (CEP) and an angle of over 30 degrees, providing effective penetration of up to 800 mm (31 in) of rolled homogeneous armour (RHA) steel with its tandem-charge warhead to deal with add-on reactive armor. In any tank, the LAHAT is stowed in the ammunition rack and handled otherwise like any other type of ammunition.

The LAHAT was renamed the "Nimrod-SR" for the Latin American market.

The United States military is considering using the LAHAT as a weapon to arm unmanned aerial vehicles. The missile has been tested on the IAI RQ-5 Hunter.

The LAHAT has been successfully test-fired from a helicopter in demonstrations. Eight missiles were launched at targets up to 10 km (6.2 mi) away, from altitudes between 300 and 6,000 ft (91 and 1,829 m). Firings were conducted while the helicopter was hovering, and moving, at targets that were fixed, and moving. One direct hit was scored using the helicopter's observation capability along with laser designation from ground forces.

== See also ==
- List of gun-launched missiles
- 9M119 Svir/Refleks – (Soviet Union)
- SAMHO – (India)
- TANOK – (Turkey)
- UMTAS – (Turkey)
