= Heavy Vehicles Factory =

Armoured vehicle and battle tank manufacturing factory

Heavy Vehicles Factory (HVF)
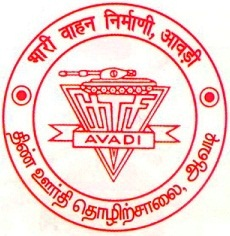

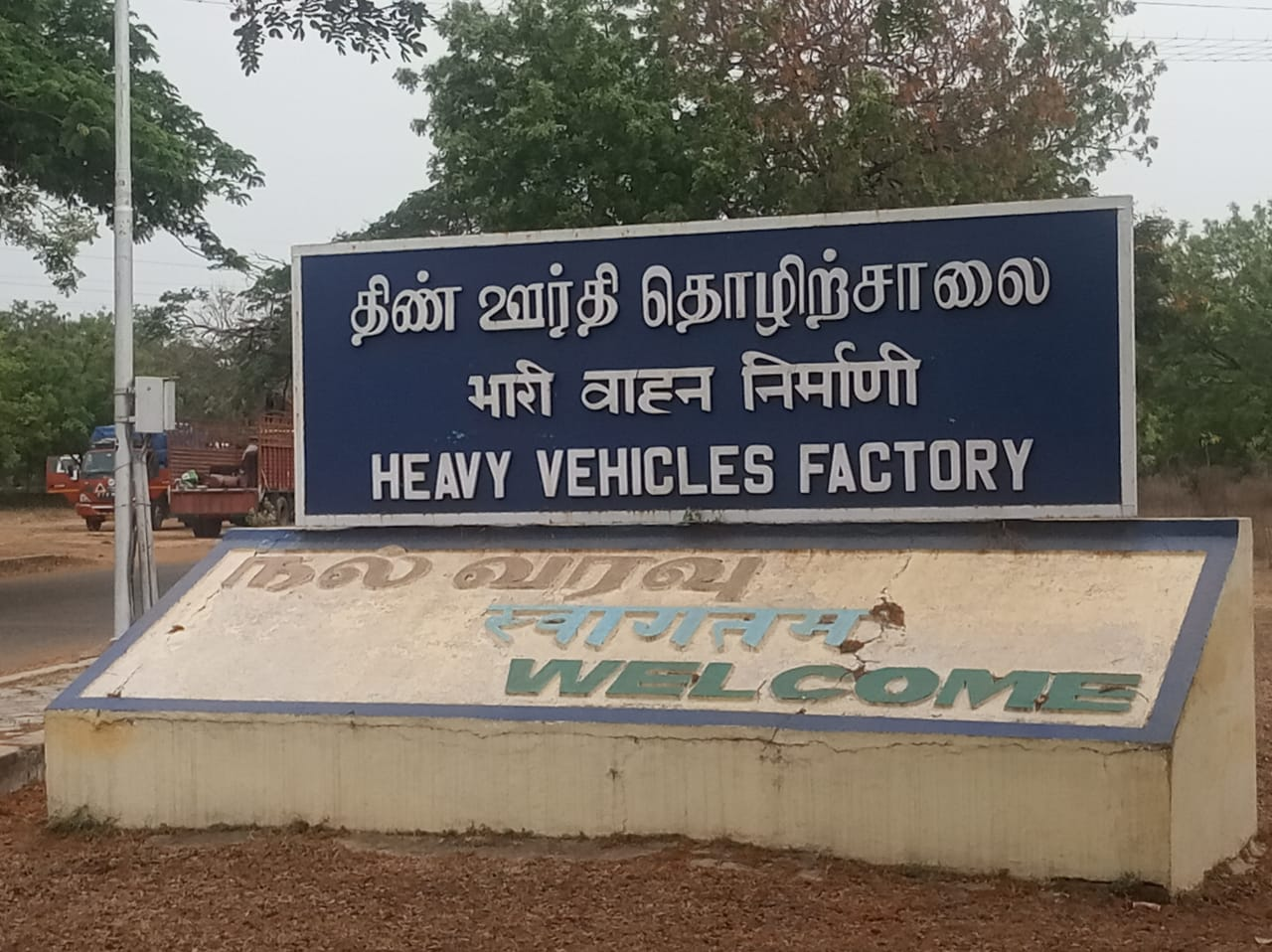
- Welcome sign at the entrance of Heavy Vehicles Factory
- Industry: Defence
- Founded: 1965
- Headquarters: Avadi, Chennai, Tamil Nadu
- Area served: Defence
- Products: Arjun MBT, T-90, T-72, Vijayanta tanks
- Parent: Armoured Vehicles Nigam Limited (current); Ordnance Factories Board (former)
- Website: Official Website

Heavy Vehicles Factory (HVF) is an armoured vehicle and battle tank manufacturing factory located at Avadi in Chennai in the Indian state of Tamil Nadu. It is managed by Armoured Vehicles Nigam Limited (AVANI) of the Ministry of Defence, Government of India.

== History ==
Heavy Vehicles Factory (HVF) was established in 1961 by the Ordnance Factory Board to manufacture heavy battlefield equipment. The design of the factory was undertaken by the Army Corps of Electrical and Mechanical Engineers (EME), and construction of the factory was organized by the Indian Army Corps of Engineers. HVF was later made part of AVANI during the re-organisation in 2021.

The HVF delivered the 1000th Bhishma tank on 22 May 2026.

== Plant ==
The factory is powered by a 16 MW solar power plant, spread over 80 acres (32 ha), commissioned in 2018 and installed by Bharat Electronics Limited (BEL) at a cost of ₹1,050 million (US$11 million). The plant helps reduce carbon dioxide (CO_{2}) emissions to the extent of 26,000 tonnes per annum, saving ₹45 million (US$470,000) each year.

== Products ==
The HCF has produced several main battle tanks including the, Vijayanta, T-72 Ajeya, Arjun MBT and T-90 Bhishma as well as their combat support variants like Kartik BLT and M-46 Catapult.

== Gallery ==
Products
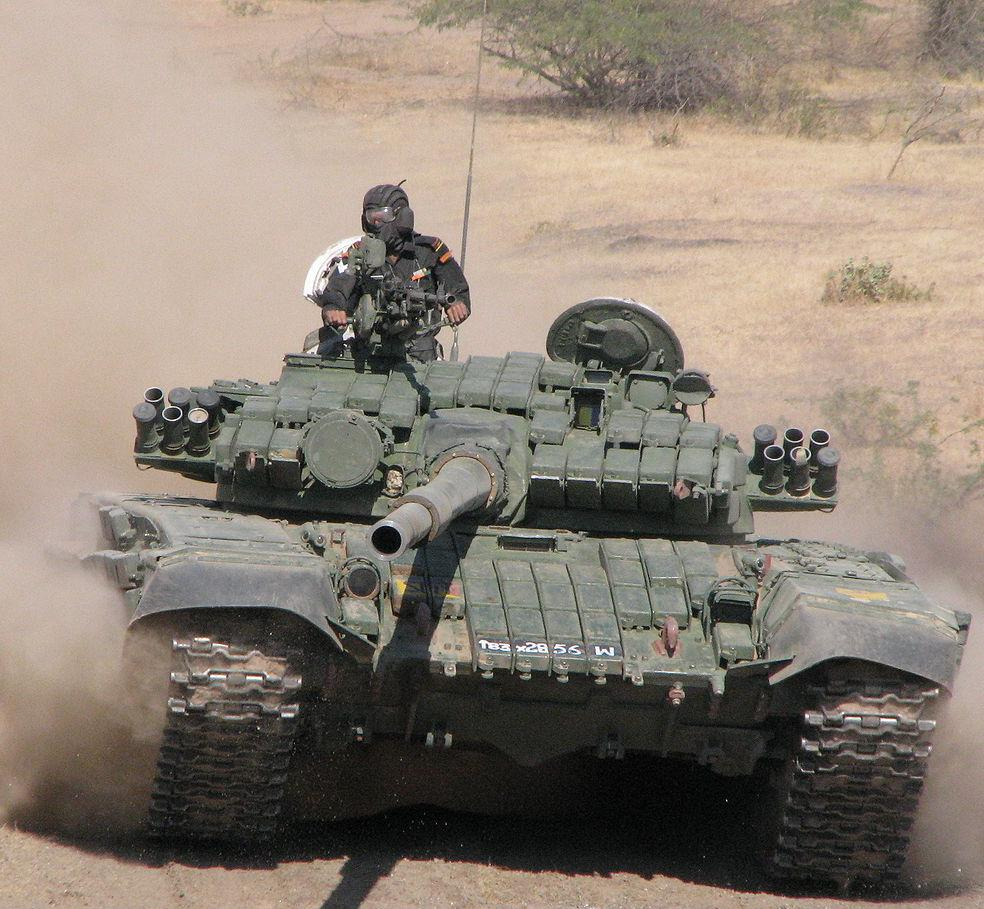
Ajeya

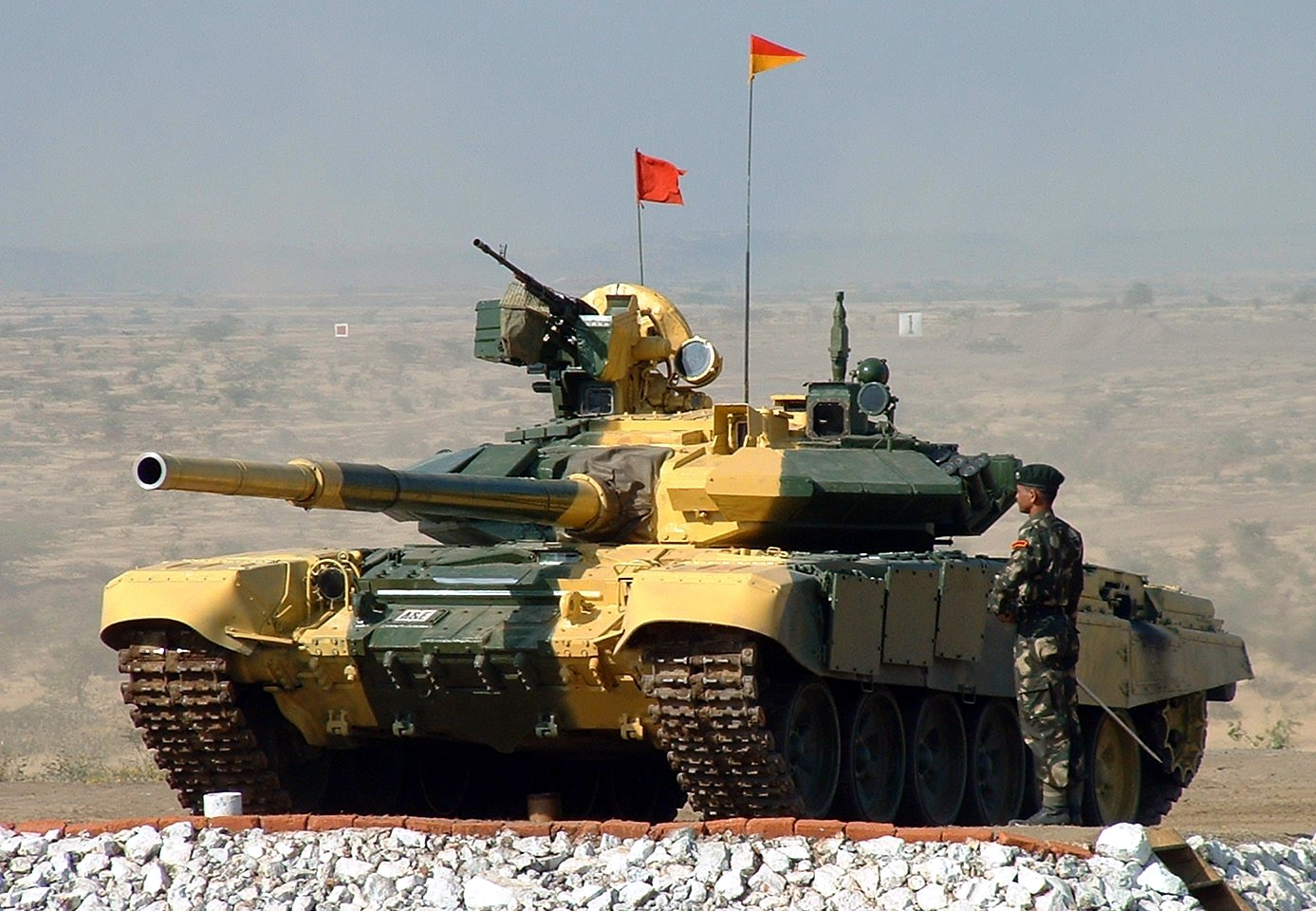
Bhishma

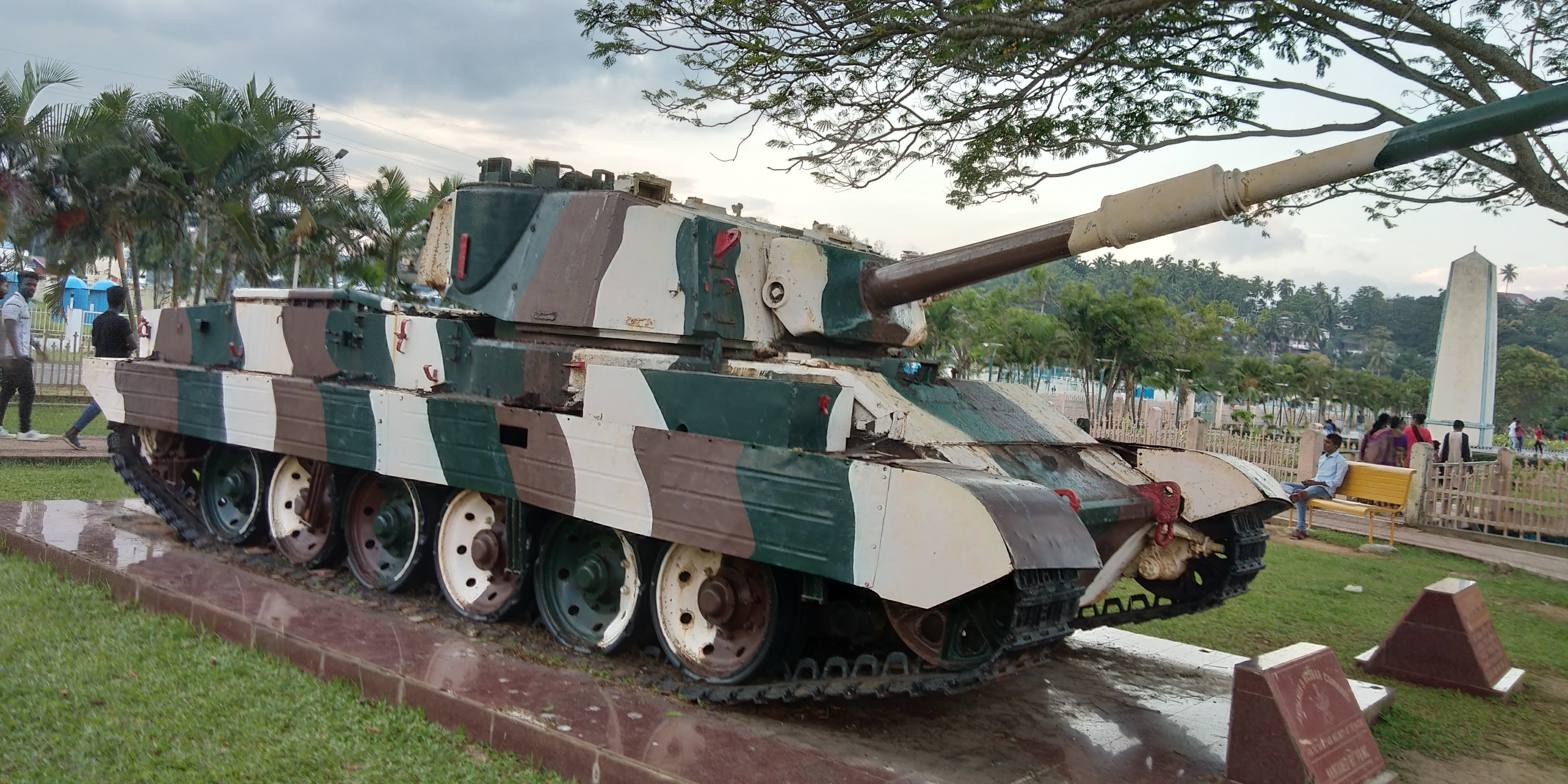
Vijayanta

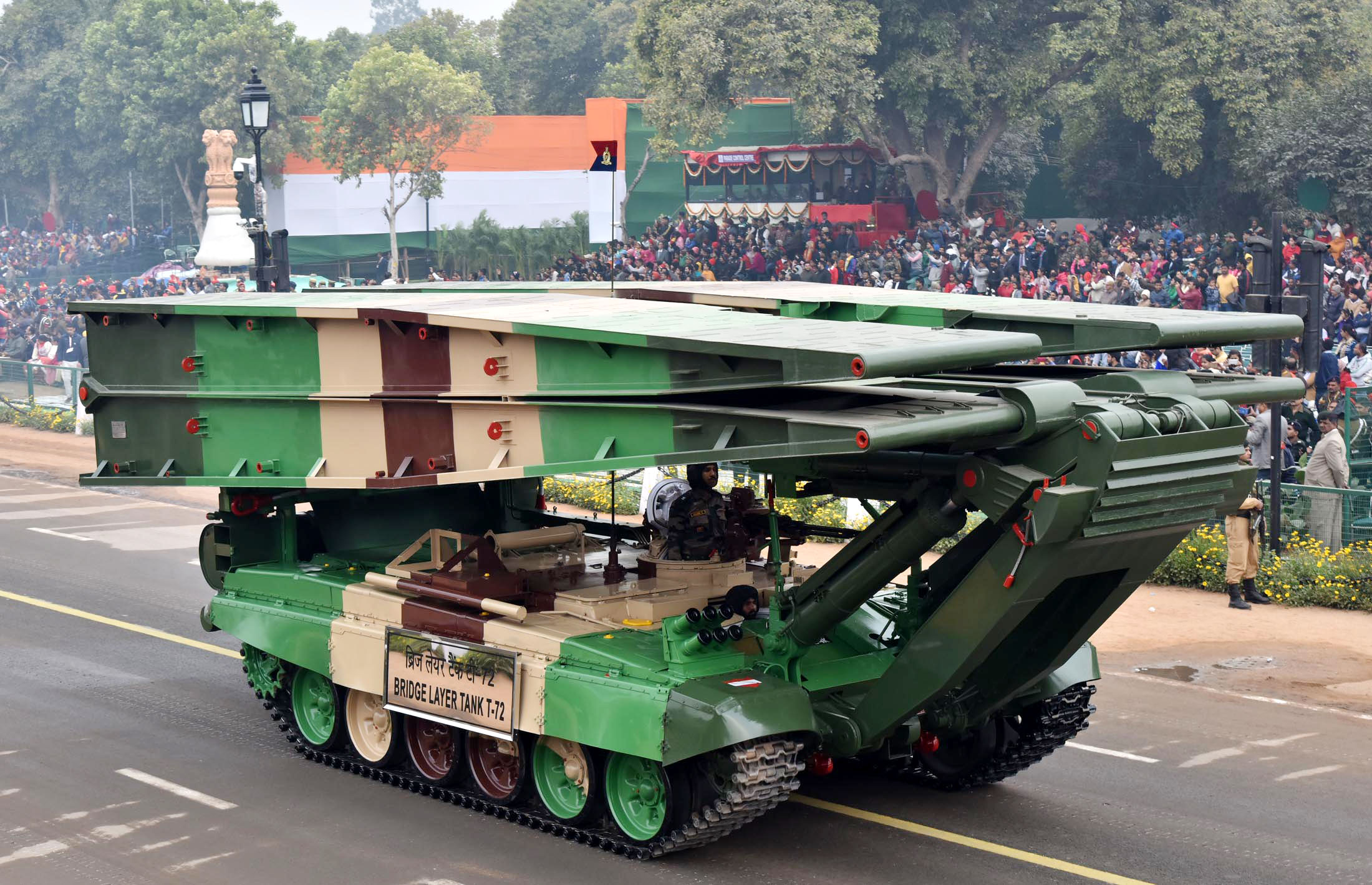
Bridge Layer Tank on Ajeya

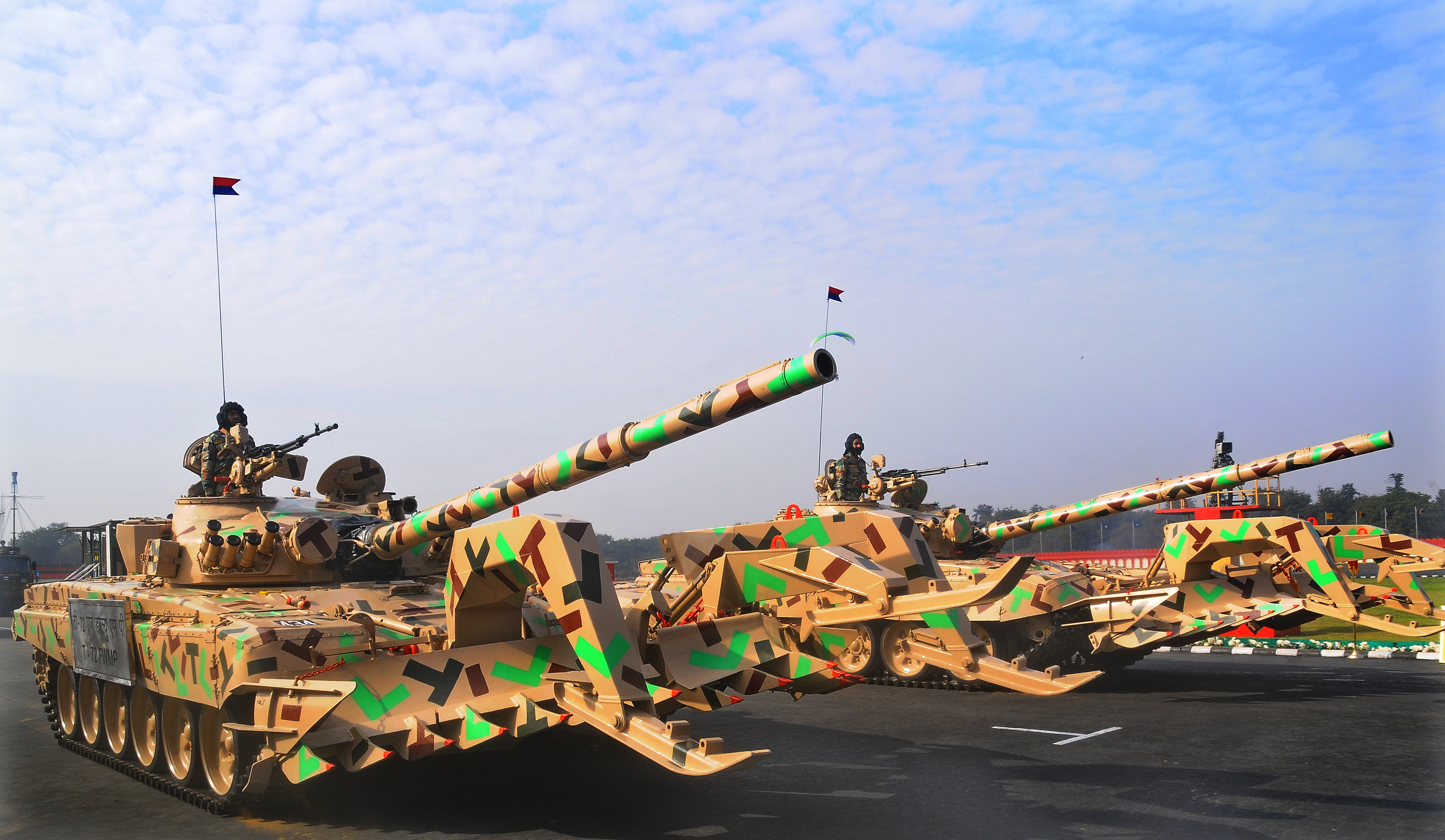
Full-width Mine Plough on Ajeya

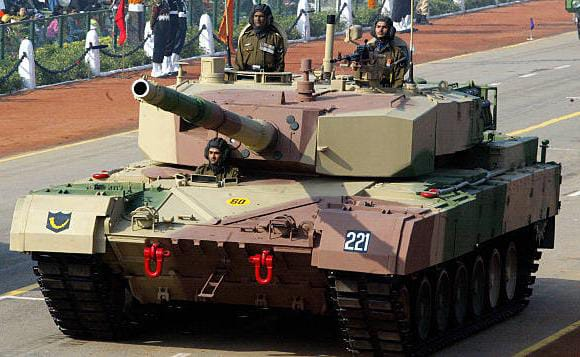
Arjun
