= Vickers MBT =

Vickers MBT Mk. 1
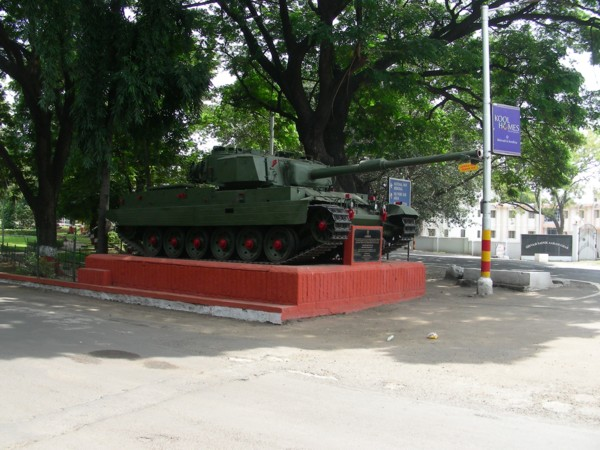
- Vijayanta MBT, a variant of the Vickers Mk. 1
- Type: Main battle tank
- Place of origin: United Kingdom

Service history
- In service: 1965–2008
- Used by: See Operators
- Wars: Indo-Pakistani War of 1965; Indo-Pakistani War of 1971; Iraqi invasion of Kuwait; 2019 India–Pakistan standoff

Production history
- Designer: Vickers
- Manufacturer: Vickers Defence Systems
- Produced: 1964–1994

Specifications
- Mass: 38 t (42 short tons)
- Length: 9.73 m (31 ft 11 in) overall gun forward
- Width: 3.17 m (10 ft 5 in)
- Height: 2.44 m (8 ft 0 in)
- Crew: 4
- Armour: Gun mantlet : 80 mm Turret front: 60 mm Turret sides: 40 mm Glacis: 60 mm Lower hull front: 80 mm Hull sides: 30 mm
- Main armament: 1 x 105 mm L7A1 gun (44 rounds)
- Secondary armament: 1 x 12.7 mm L6A1 ranging machine gun with 700 rounds 1 x 7.62 mm MG (pintle mount) with 1,300 rounds 1 x 7.62 mm MG (coax) with 1,300 rounds
- Engine: Leyland L60 (multi-fuel 2-stroke opposed-piston compression-ignition); 535 hp (399 kW) 6 cyl, 19 litres
- Power/weight: 13.79 bhp/t
- Transmission: Merrit-Wilson TN-12 (6 fwd / 2 rev) with a triple differential steering system
- Suspension: Torsion bars
- Operational range: 480 km (300 miles) on roads
- Maximum speed: Road: 48 km/h (30 mph); Off road: 30 km/h (19 mph)

The Vickers MBT is a series of main battle tanks (MBTs) developed as a private venture by British company Vickers-Armstrongs for export. The design makes use of proven components, such as the L7 gun of the Centurion, the Leyland L60 multi-fuel engine, the transmission and fire control system of the Chieftain. A variant was built under licence in India as the Vijayanta, and served with the Indian Army.

== Design and development ==
The Vickers MBT followed on from a 24-tonne 20-pdr gunned tank design intended for export. This would be as well equipped as a Centurion but substantially cheaper and with eight Vickers Vigilant anti-tank missiles it would be as effective. However, with the introduction of the 105 mm L7 gun into the British, US and German tank designs, this light tank would have been less powerful while too large for the reconnaissance role, and so a new design was required. With armour twice that of the light tank design, it would still be 12 tonnes lighter than Centurion and hence more mobile. The design would use the new engine and transmission of the Chieftain tank then being developed. The development coincided with an agreement with India in 1961 to produce a tank design and help set up a factory there to produce it.

The Vickers MBT Mk 1 was designed to be a simple, low-cost, but effective tank. The first prototype was completed in 1963. In 1964, one of the prototypes was sent to India.

The Vickers was made of welded rolled homogeneous armour plates. It weighed 38,600 kg, carried a 105 mm gun with 44 rounds and had a top speed of 48 km/h. 70 tanks were sold to Kuwait and many of a modified version were made in India where the tank was called Vijayanta.

== Versions ==
- Vickers MBT Mk. 1: original model.
- Al Jahra: Mk. 1 sold to Kuwait in 1970, it includes modifications to the engine filters for use in desert conditions and featured transistored AEI gun control equipment instead of GEC valve, one rear wheel on either side was moved backwards to improve wheel loading, trench crossing and reduce ground pressure, they also lack flotation equipment.
- Vickers MBT Mark 1(i): improved Mk. 1 fitted with a General Motors Detroit Diesel 12V-71T engine, a thermal sleeve for the gun (L7A1 gun redesignated L7A2) and improved optics.
- Vijayanta: Mk. 1 built locally in India.

== Other developments ==
=== Vickers Main Battle Tank Mark 2 ===
The 1968 proposal for a vehicle specification that differed from the Mark 1 in the following respects:

1. Transistorised gun-control equipment.
2. New turret of cast front and mantlet-less design, with new gun mounting.
3. Improved frontal aspect to the hull and turret.
4. Improved track, suitable for 56 km/h (35 mph) continuously.
5. Reduced ground pressure due to reduced total weight, increased track width and increased track on the ground by moving two (or three) rear wheel stations backwards (made possible by the change to a General Motors engine).
6. Engine delivering full horsepower as for the Chieftain through redesigned final drives to give 56+ km/h (made possible by the General Motors engine's potential for uprating).
7. Improved commander cupola to take the Chieftain vision devices.
8. Provision for fitting four Swingfire wire-controlled anti-tank missiles (intended as a response to weapons of greater range, such as the 120 mm L11 tank gun.

The Mark 2 did not proceed beyond a mock-up although a Vickers Mark 1 MBT with four Swingfire missiles, two mounted either side of the turret towards the rear, was shown at Farnborough. A note in Vickers's files dated from 20 November 1970 explains the probable reason: "Guided missiles have an inherent disadvantage in that is almost impossible to fire them from under armour since the rocket motor efflux presents a serious problem. Generally speaking, the best that can be achieved is to put the crew under armour and mount the missiles externally. This presents reloading problems and leaves the missiles vulnerable to small arms and mortar fire."

In any case, only four spare missile rounds could be carried.

=== Vickers Main Battle Tank Mark 3 ===
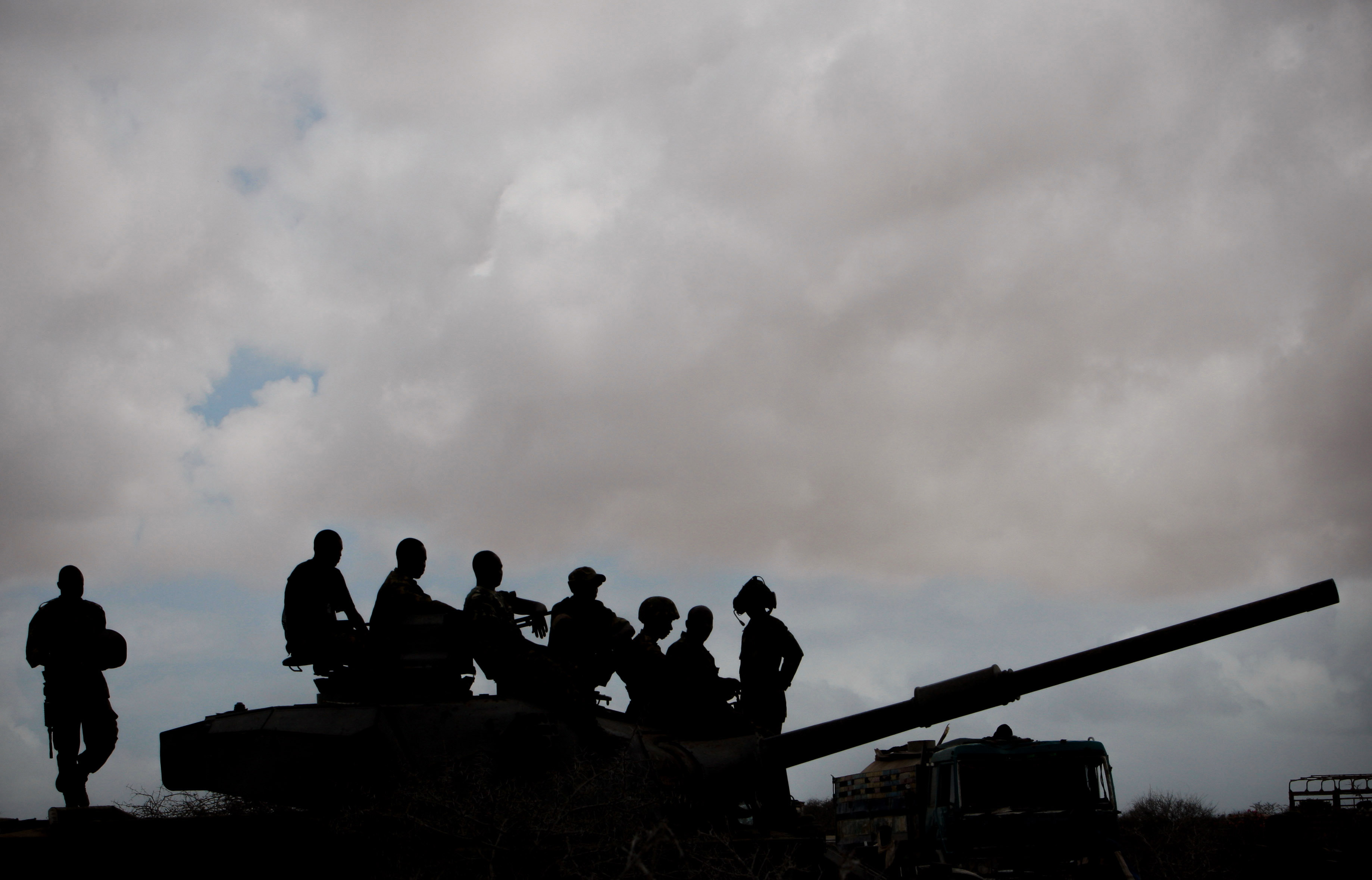
Silhouette of Kenyan troops on top of a Vickers Mark 3 outside of Kismayo, Somalia in 2012

The Mk. 3 was introduced in 1975 for the export market. It was the last of the Vickers tanks to see sales in numbers abroad. In 1974, Vickers pressed on with development of a Mark 3 version. This stems from Design No. 51400 T and differs from the Mark 1 mainly in having a turret with a well-shaped cast front welded to a fabricated armour plate body. It also has a cast gun mantlet which is better shaped from the point of view of its resistance to armour-piercing projectiles than the flat mantlet of the Mark. 1. The Mark 3 embodies various other improvements, such as an increase in the depression of its main gun from -7 to -10 degrees below the horizontal and an increase in the ammunition from 44 to 50 rounds. The first production order for Mk. 3 tanks was placed in 1977 by the Government of Kenya

=== Vickers Main Battle Tank Mark 4 (Valiant) ===
In 1977, Vickers produced a design for a vehicle that incorporated Chobham composite armour protection within a battle weight of 43 tonnes. This first prototype, designated the Vickers Main Battle Tank Mark 4.

=== Vickers Main Battle Tank Mark 7 ===
The Vickers Mk 7 consisted of a third generation Vickers Valiant turret mounted on a Krauss-Maffei-supplied chassis that in the prototype is essentially that of the Leopard 2 MBT. The tank had a Marconi digital fire control system, an SFIM panoramic sight and a Philips 2nd Gen thermal imager. The Mark 7 has three features that reduces the likelihood of its detection by night sights and other heat-sensing devices. These are its coat of infra-red reflective paint; the mixing of the hot exhaust gases with the cooling air before discharge; and a new design of thermal sleeve.

=== Vickers Anti-aircraft Tank ===
Equipped with the Marksman turret, as well as a self-propelled 155mm howitzer with the GBT 155 turret. The GBT 155 was unveiled in 1982 and was armed with the same 155mm ordnance as the AS-90. It was designed primarily for existing tank chassis.

== Operators ==
Operators Current Former

=== Current operators ===
- Kenya - 76 MBT Mk 3 and 7 ARV delivered in 1979–1982
- Nigeria - 136 MBT Mk 3, 12 ARV and 26 AVLB delivered in 1983–1995
- Tanzania - 4 ARV delivered in 1989

=== Former operators ===
- India - 90 Vickers Mk. 1 built by Vickers and shipped to India in 1965 where it carried the designation Vijayanta (phased out in 2008).
- Kuwait - 70 Vickers Mk. 1 delivered in 1970–1972, probably no longer operational
- Iraq - limited usage of captured Kuwaiti Mk. 1s, all scrapped or destroyed.
- Boko Haram - few Nigerian Mk. 3 were captured, later they were knocked out or recaptured by Nigerian Army.

== See also ==
- Challenger 1 and 2 – (United Kingdom)
- Chieftain – (United Kingdom)
- Vijayanta – (United Kingdom, India)

== Sources ==
- Orgorkiewcz, R M, No. 45 Vickers Battle Tank, AFV Profile, Profile Publishing
