= James Lemke =

James Lemke may refer to:

- James Lemke (tennis) (born 1988), Australian tennis player
- James U. Lemke (1929–2019), American physicist and entrepreneur
