= Tilling-Stevens =

Former British commercial vehicle manufacturer

Tilling-Stevens Ltd.
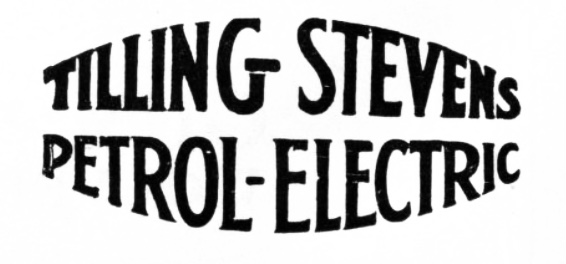
- Type: Private
- Industry: Automotive
- Founded: 1897; 129 years ago
- Founder: William Arthur Stevens
- Defunct: 1950; 76 years ago
- Headquarters: Maidstone, England
- Products: Automobile

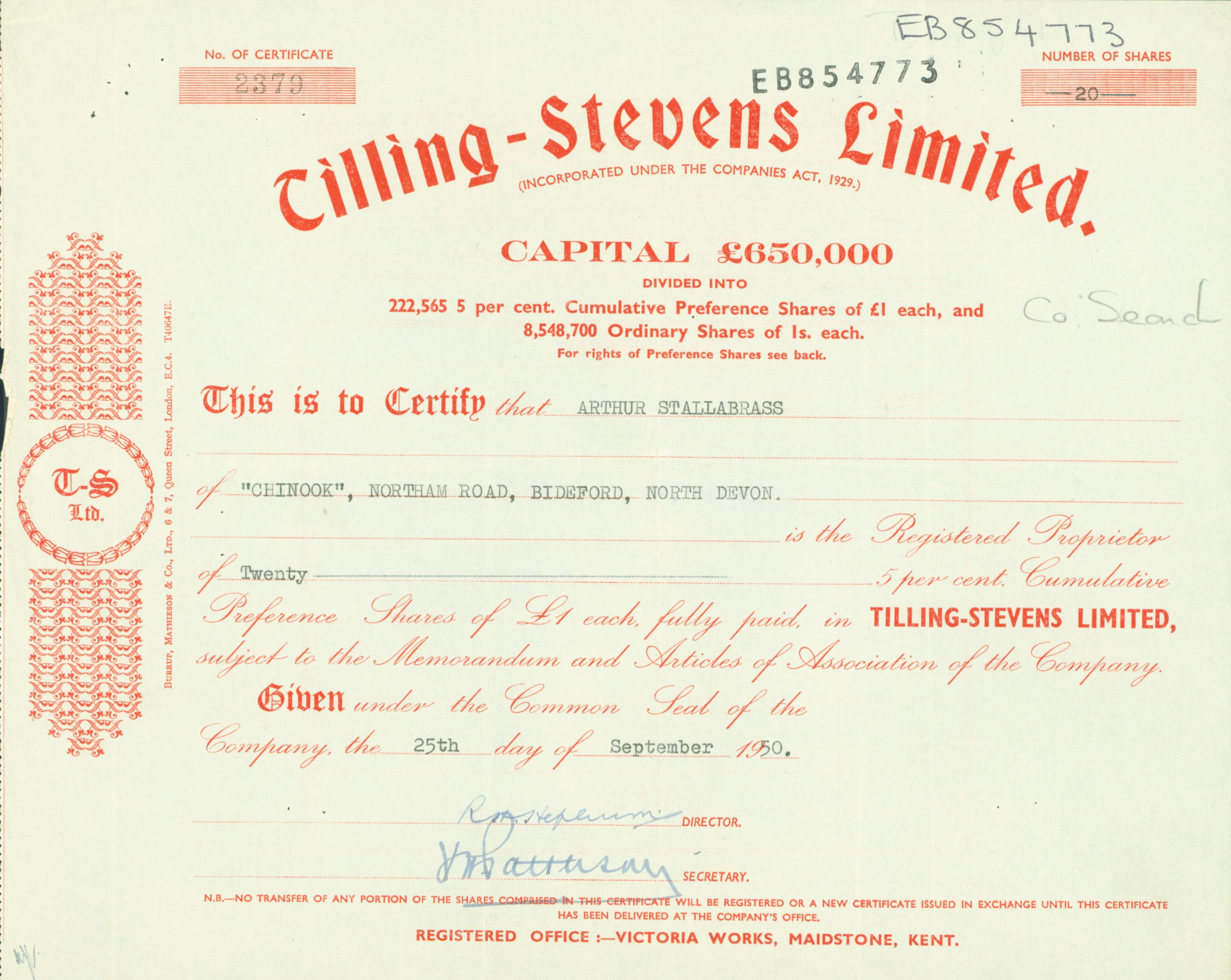
Preference Share of the Tilling-Stevens Ltd., issued 25. September 1950

Tilling-Stevens was a British manufacturer of buses and other commercial vehicles, based in Maidstone, Kent. Originally established in 1897, it became a specialist in petrol–electric vehicles. It continued as an independent manufacturer until 1950, when it was acquired by the Rootes Group.

== W A Stevens of Maidstone ==
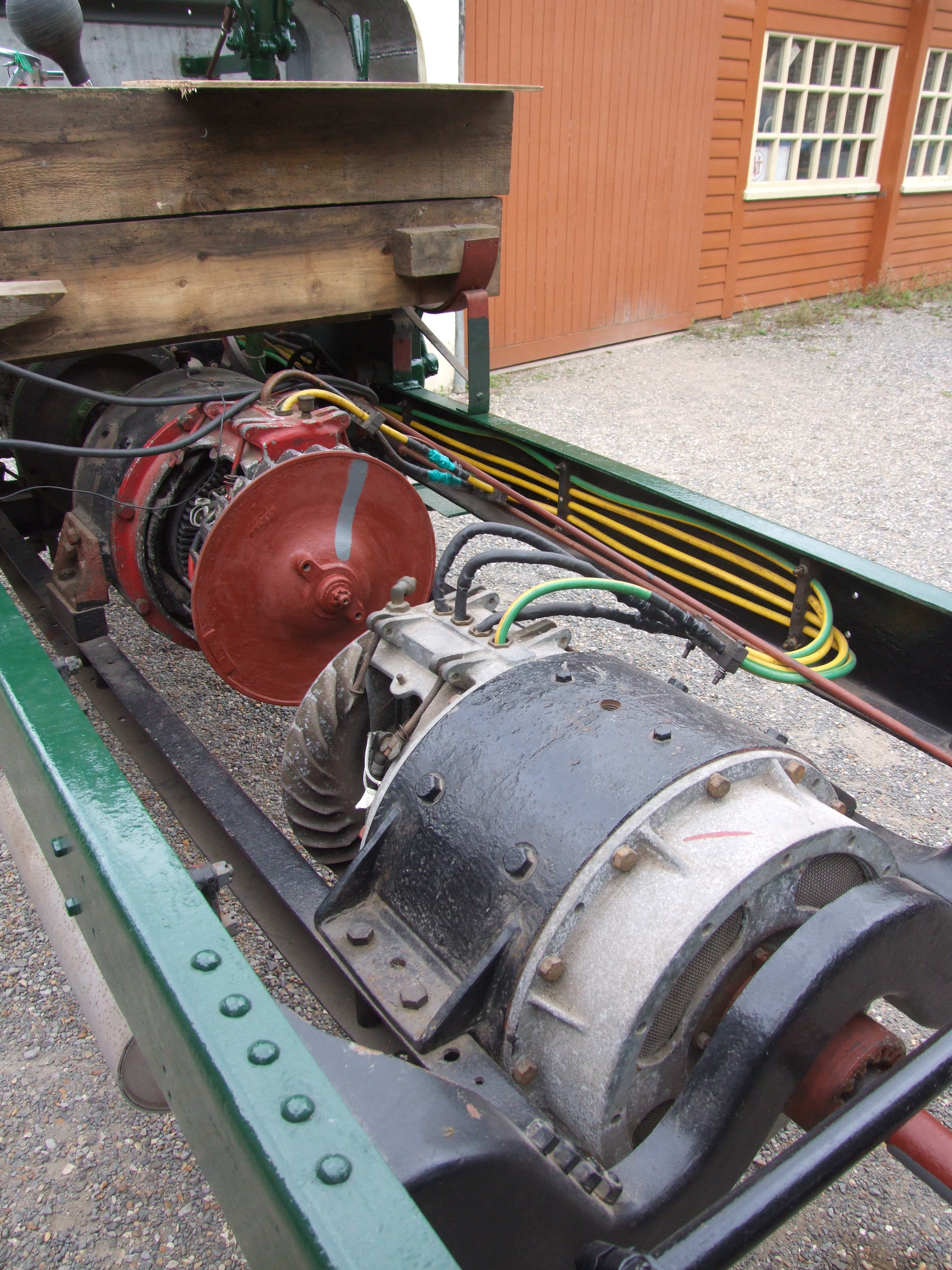
Tilling-Stevens bus chassis 1923 generator (red) traction motor (grey)

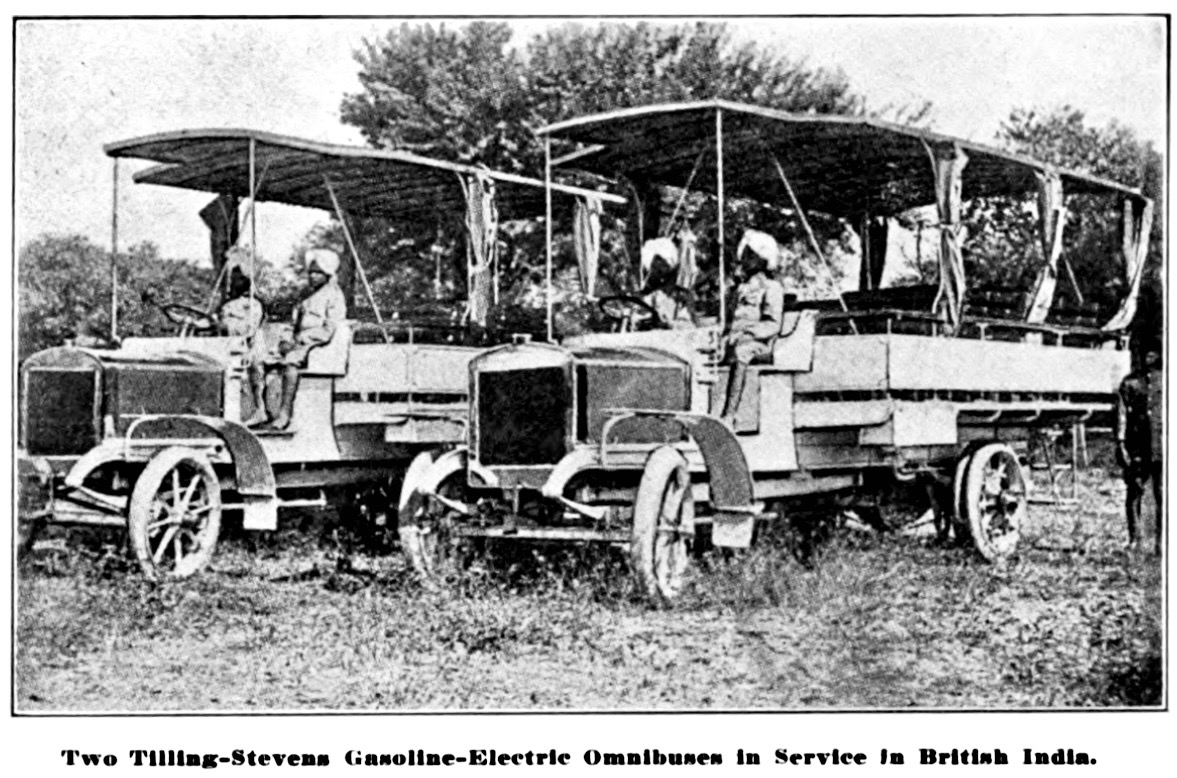
Tilling-Stevens bus (1912)

W.A. Stevens was established in Maidstone in 1897 by William Arthur Stevens and, by 1906, had built its first petrol–electric vehicle using designs patented by Percival (Percy) Frost-Smith. A petrol engine was connected to an electrical generator, and the current produced was fed to a traction motor that drove the rear wheels. W.A. Stevens also patented a system for converting conventional petrol buses for either battery–electric or petrol–electric propulsion, patent GB190820210.

== Percy Frost-Smith ==
Percival Harry Frost-Smith was Managing Director of Tilling-Stevens Ltd in 1915–16, and he obtained several patents for improvements to motor vehicles between 1908 and 1918. These included:

- With William Arthur Stevens, Worm drive for vehicles
- With Francis Edwin Brown, Improvements in and relating to Worm Drive for Mechanically Propelled Vehicles
- With Victor Snow Robinson, Improvements in and connected with the Electric Lighting of Vehicles
- With Tilling-Stevens Ltd, Improved Means of Control for Petrol Electric Vehicles

Francis Edwin Brown was a son of David Brown, of David Brown Ltd.

== Buses ==
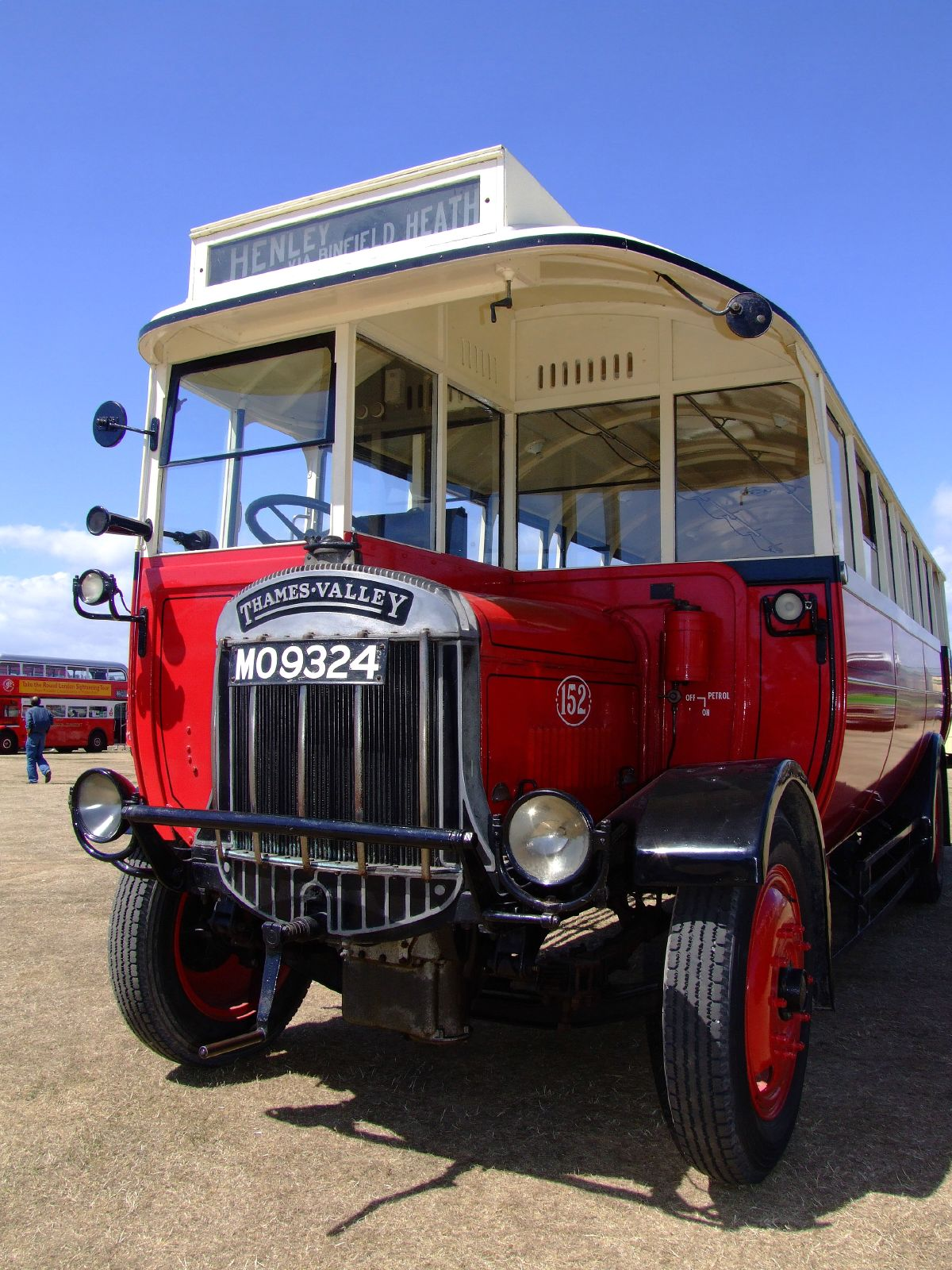
Thames Valley bus delivered 1927

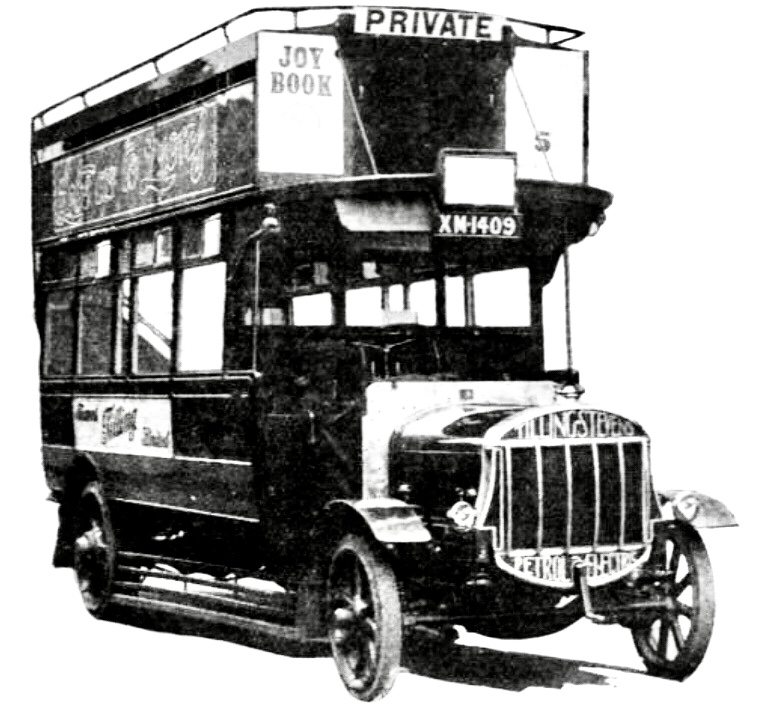
Tilling-Stevens 48-seater bus; For the London bus works alone, 175 vehicles were produced.

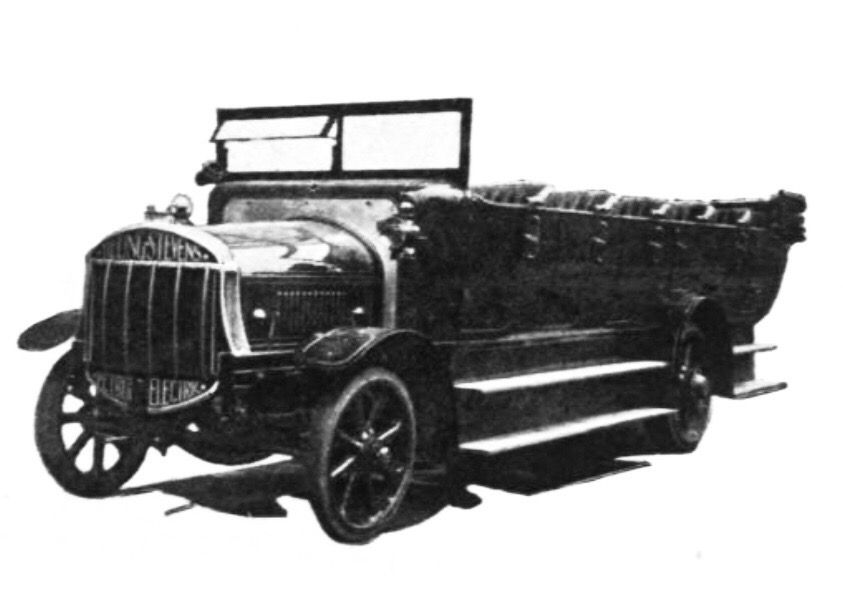
Tilling-Stevens Charabancs

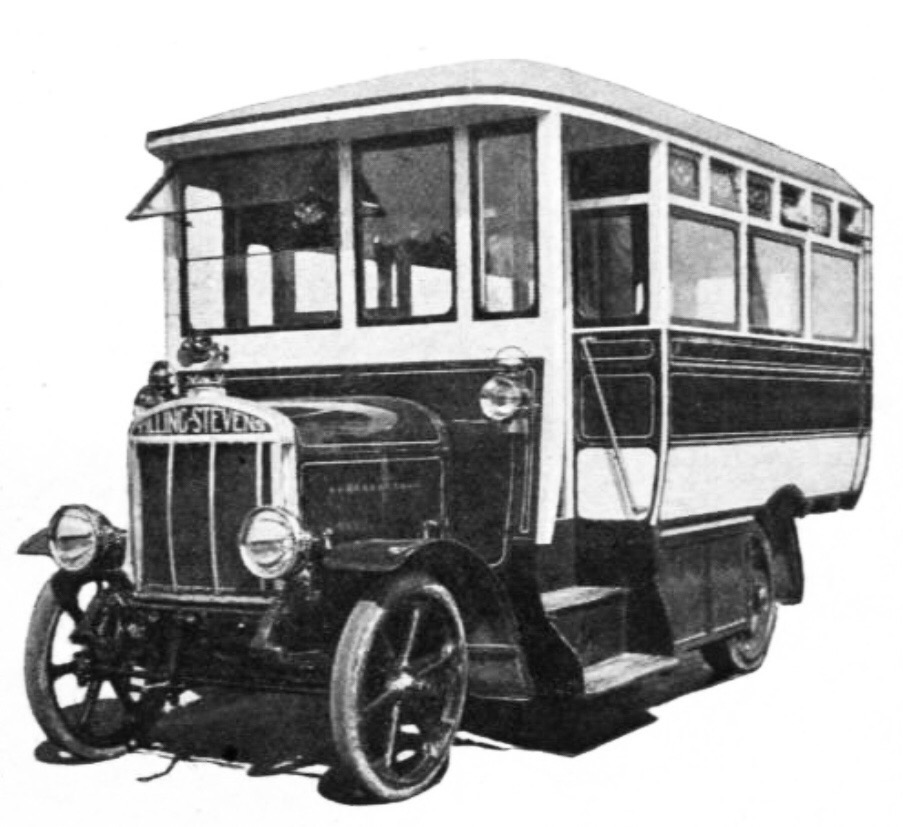
Tilling-Stevens 20-seater

=== Hallford-Stevens and Dennis-Stevens ===
The petrol–electric transmission was fitted to chassis built by J & E Hall, of Dartford, who used the trade name Hallford, so these were known as Hallford-Stevens. Transmissions were also supplied to Dennis Bros, of Guildford, and these vehicles were named Dennis-Stevens.

=== Tilling-Stevens ===
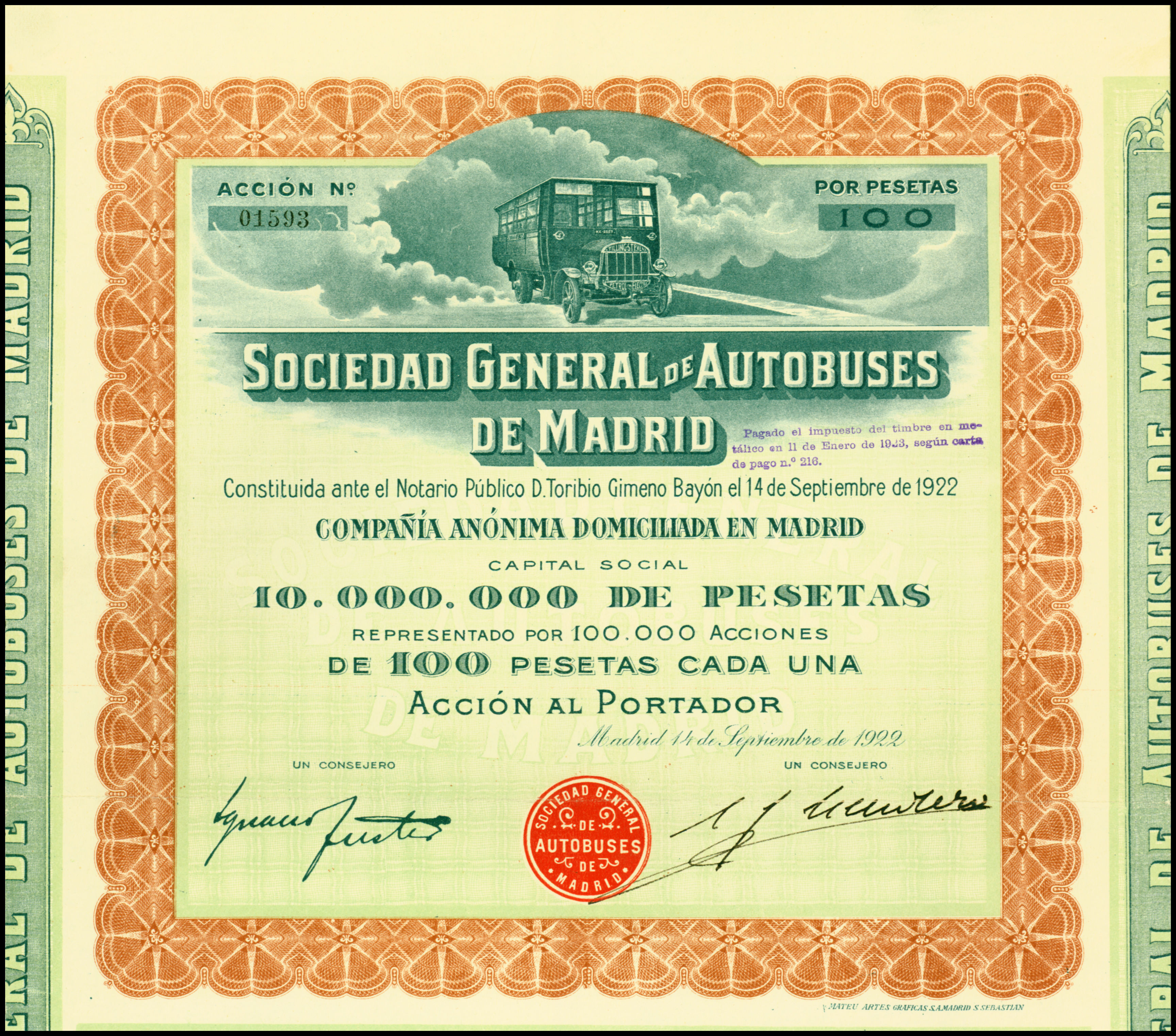
Share of the S.G. de Autobuses de Madrid, issued 14. September 1922; it shows a petrol–electric Tilling-Stevens bus

An arrangement was agreed with a large bus operator, Thomas Tilling, who wanted to produce their own vehicles named Tilling-Stevens. The ease of driving and soundness of construction of these vehicles soon led to the company supplying chassis to many bus operators in the UK and several abroad as well. According to the website of the Transport Museum Wythall, the simpler-to-operate petrol–electric transmission was popular among bus drivers rather than the conventional crash gearbox (in the days before synchromesh), as few bus staff had previously driven motor vehicles. Tilling-Stevens Motors Ltd was obliged to consolidate its position with bus operators during World War I because the Army considered their petrol–electric chassis unsuitable for use in France. The low-mounted electrical items were considered vulnerable.

During the War many men were trained to drive on vehicles with conventional gearboxes, and developments in gearbox design made their vehicles quieter, more reliable and lighter, resulting in better economy. All this combined to lead to a decline in popularity of the Tilling-Stevens and other petrol–electric systems. By the 1930s, Tilling-Stevens chassis were being produced with conventional petrol and diesel engines, gearboxes and transmissions.

In 1927, 18 of the state prisoner transporters were built on chassis from Tilling-Stevens, with a permissible total weight of 2500 kg. An emergency vehicle had the same chassis.

Tilling-Stevens split from Thomas Tilling in 1930 and renamed themselves T S Motors Ltd (TSM) in 1932, but they were again renamed Tilling-Stevens in 1937, before World War II had broken out.

Tilling-Stevens was still manufacturing buses after World War II, with a large order built in 1947–48 for export to Hong Kong (108 units for China Motor Bus & 50 units for Kowloon Motor Bus).

TS was eventually purchased by Rootes Group in 1950, and a long-under-development three-cylinder two-stroke engine was extensively used in Rootes' Group's Commer lorries (discussed below).

== Trolleybuses ==
Tilling-Stevens also produced trolleybuses. An existing customer of petrol–electric buses, Wolverhampton Corporation, decided to replace trams with trolleybuses on one route of their Corporation Tramway and asked Tilling to supply them. The result was an adapted version of the hybrid TS6 model with electrical components by BTH of Bath, Somerset, and body by Christopher Dodson. The first six entered service in 1923. Further orders followed from Halifax Corporation and in 1924 the general manager of the Teesside Railless Traction Board designed a trolleybus chassis which was built by Tilling-Stevens. This chassis, designated PERC1, could use a petrol engine to drive the dynamo and power the traction motor as well as take overhead power.

The company subsequently purchased the rights to the Teesside design after receiving enquiries from abroad, but domestic production ceased after 1927. Following the initial split from Thomas Tilling, the company produced one further new chassis, which was exhibited at the 1930 Scottish Motor Show. Only one sale was made, to Turin, Italy.

== Goods vehicles ==
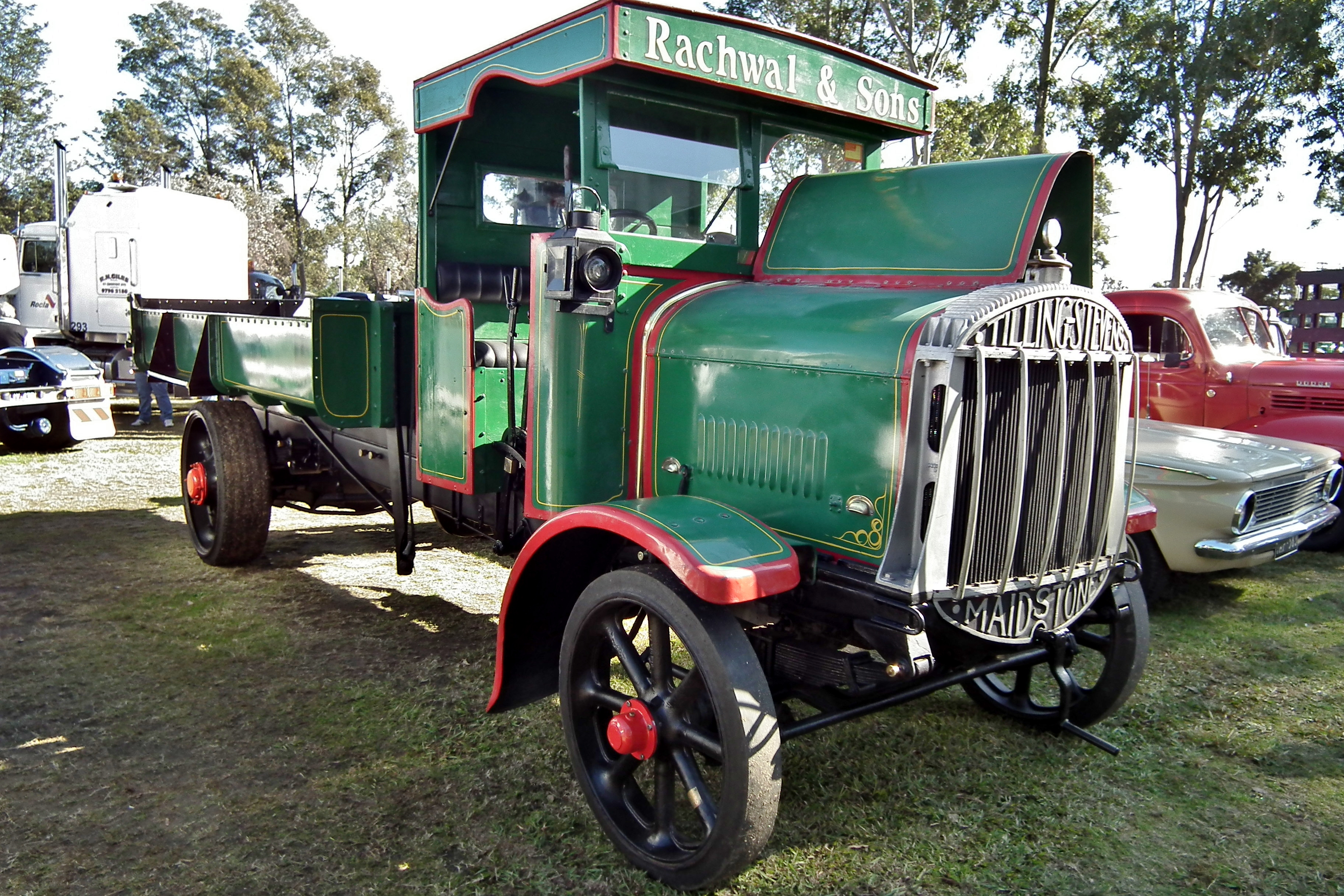
1914 TSB3 tipper

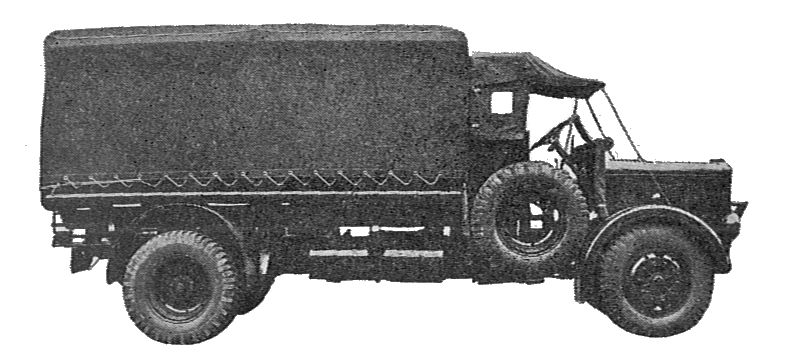
Petrol–electric searchlight lorry

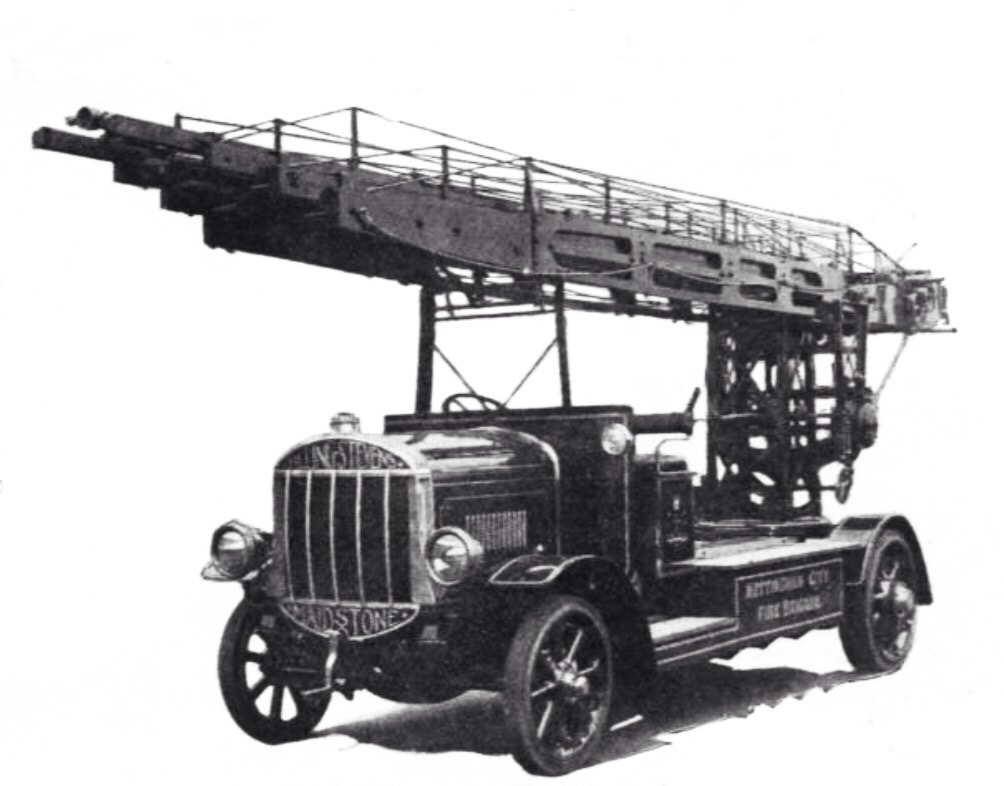
Tilling-Stevens turntabel ladder 26 m

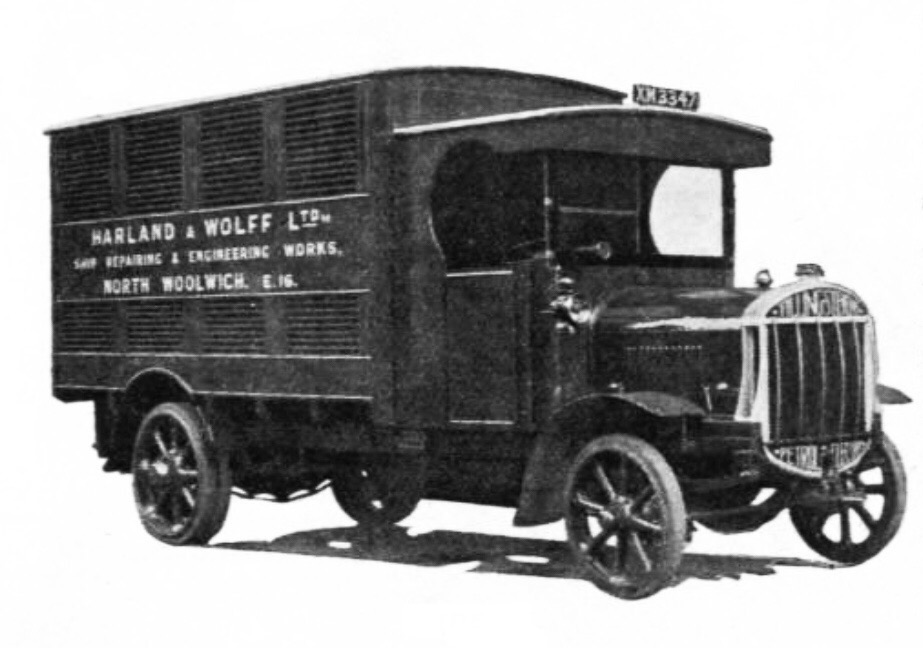
Tilling-Stevens truck

Tilling-Stevens also produced goods chassis available with either petrol–electric or conventional gearbox transmissions and built many trucks during World War I. Their cast aluminium radiators were distinctive, with "Tilling-Stevens" cast into the top and either "Petrol–electric" or "Maidstone" into the bottom tanks.

After the war, they failed to invest in updating their products and ended up building mainly buses. Tilling-Stevens therefore acquired Vulcan Trucks of Southport, Lancashire, in 1938 to extend their range (and use Vulcan petrol engines). Production stayed at Maidstone, and Vulcan's production was also relocated there.

The unusual electric transmission became less of an advantage as other makers developed their simpler mechanical transmissions to be reliable and easier to drive. Tilling-Stevens specialised in some unusual markets where the transmission could offer a particular advantage, by also using it as a generator. Some early turntable ladder fire engines were produced where arc lamps for lighting and the electric motors to raise the ladder could be powered by it.

In the 1930s the lorries also lost the large cast radiators in favour of, first, a thinner cast-aluminium shell, and then a cheaper steel-pressed bonnet and a small diamond-shaped "TSM" badge.

Leading up to World War II they specialised in the searchlight trucks for which they are probably still best known today.

== Rootes Group ==
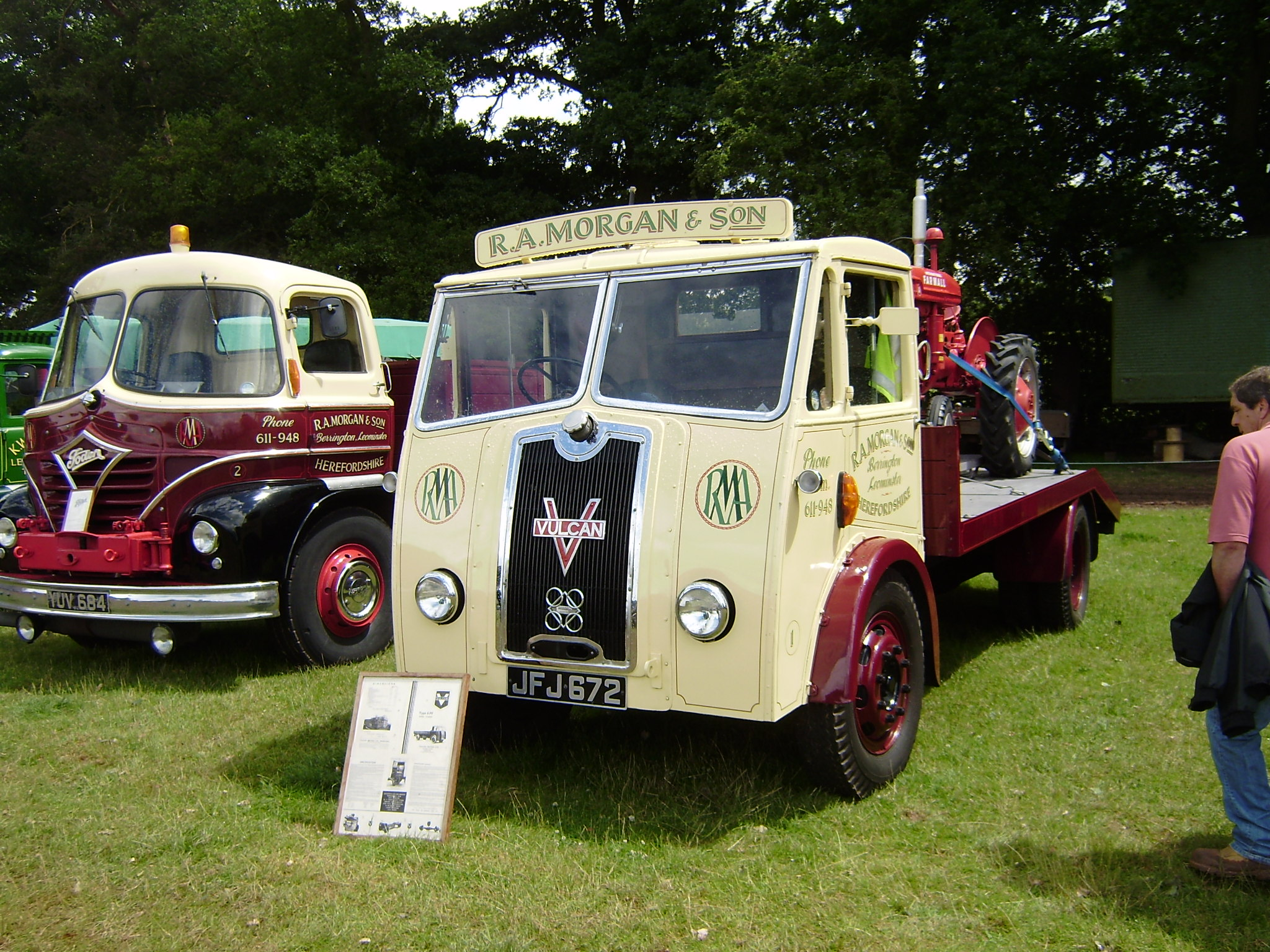
1949 Vulcan truck fitted with Perkins diesel engine, on show at Bromyard, England in 2008

In 1950, the company was sold to Rootes Group. Complete-vehicle production ceased in 1953, as Rootes' own truck brands had developed heavier trucks themselves. The plant continued to produce light commercial engines (particularly the iconic Commer TS3 two-stroke diesel, which had been intended for introduction by Tilling-Stevens in 1954), and vehicle bodies, before finally closing in the 1970s, some years after the group had been acquired by Chrysler.

== Factory ==
The Tilling-Stevens factory was situated in St Peter's Street, Maidstone. The factory buildings, built in the 1920s in the Daylight style, survive as of 2012. They were listed as Grade II in July 2011. It is described as one of few instances of this style not to have undergone significant alteration from the original.

== Petrol–electric engines and their legacy ==
The Tilling-Stevens petrol–electric bus is interesting as an early example of a petrol-engined road vehicle using electric, rather than mechanical, transmission. It is distinct from a hybrid vehicle, as it has no battery storage; the electric dynamo and motor operate only as a replacement for the gearbox in a conventional internal-combustion-engine–driven vehicle.

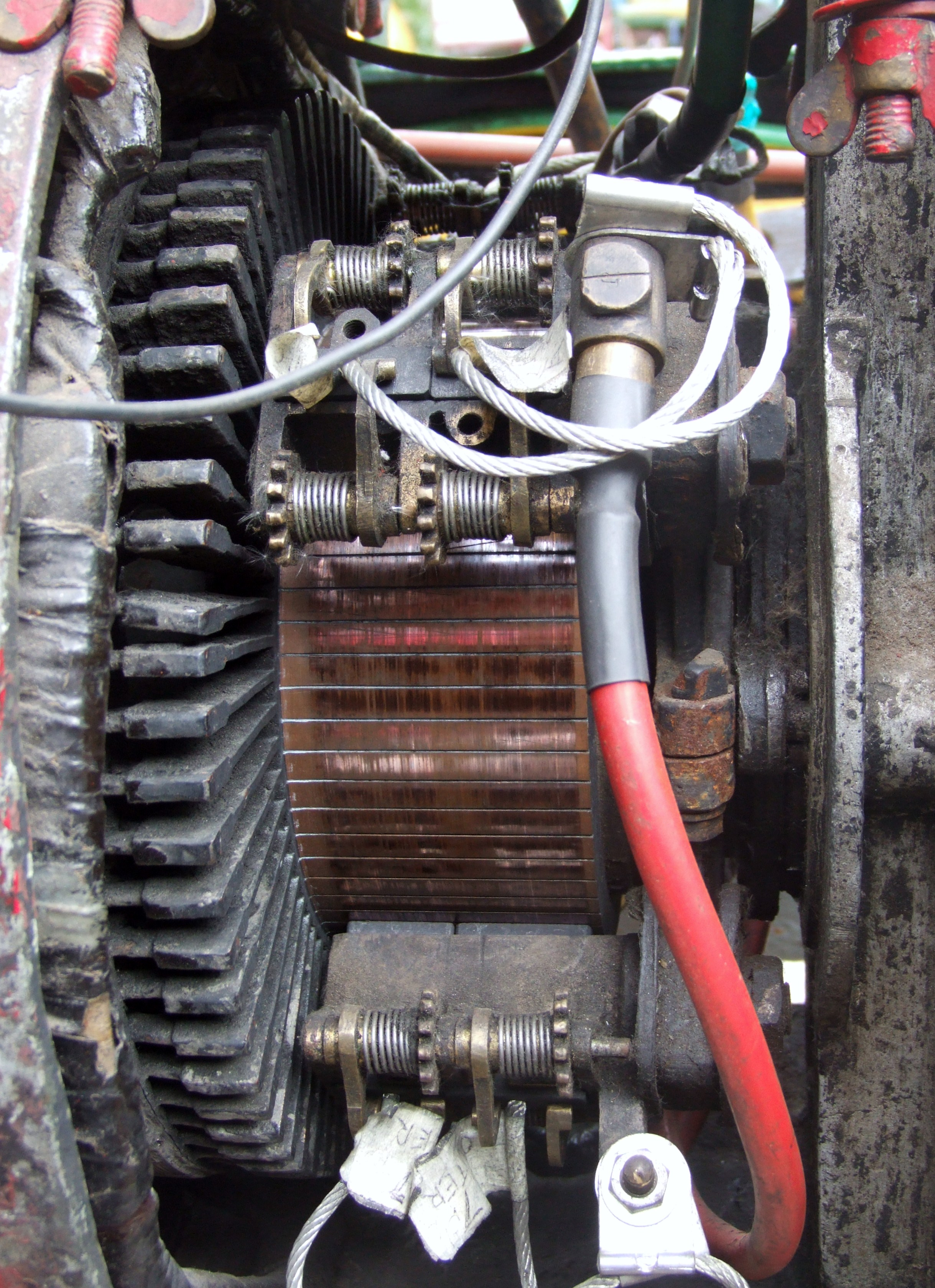
Generator, 1923

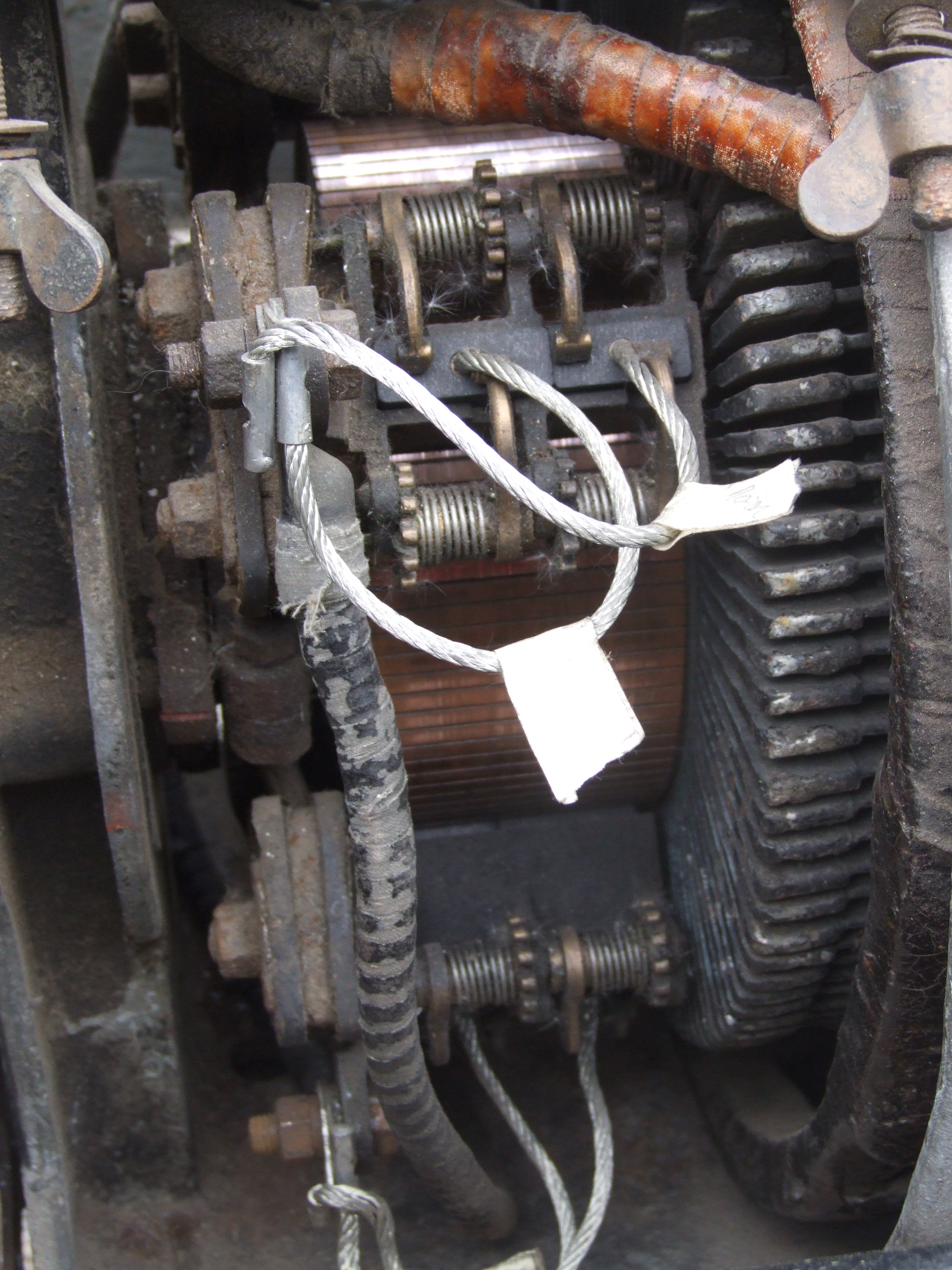
Traction motor, 1923

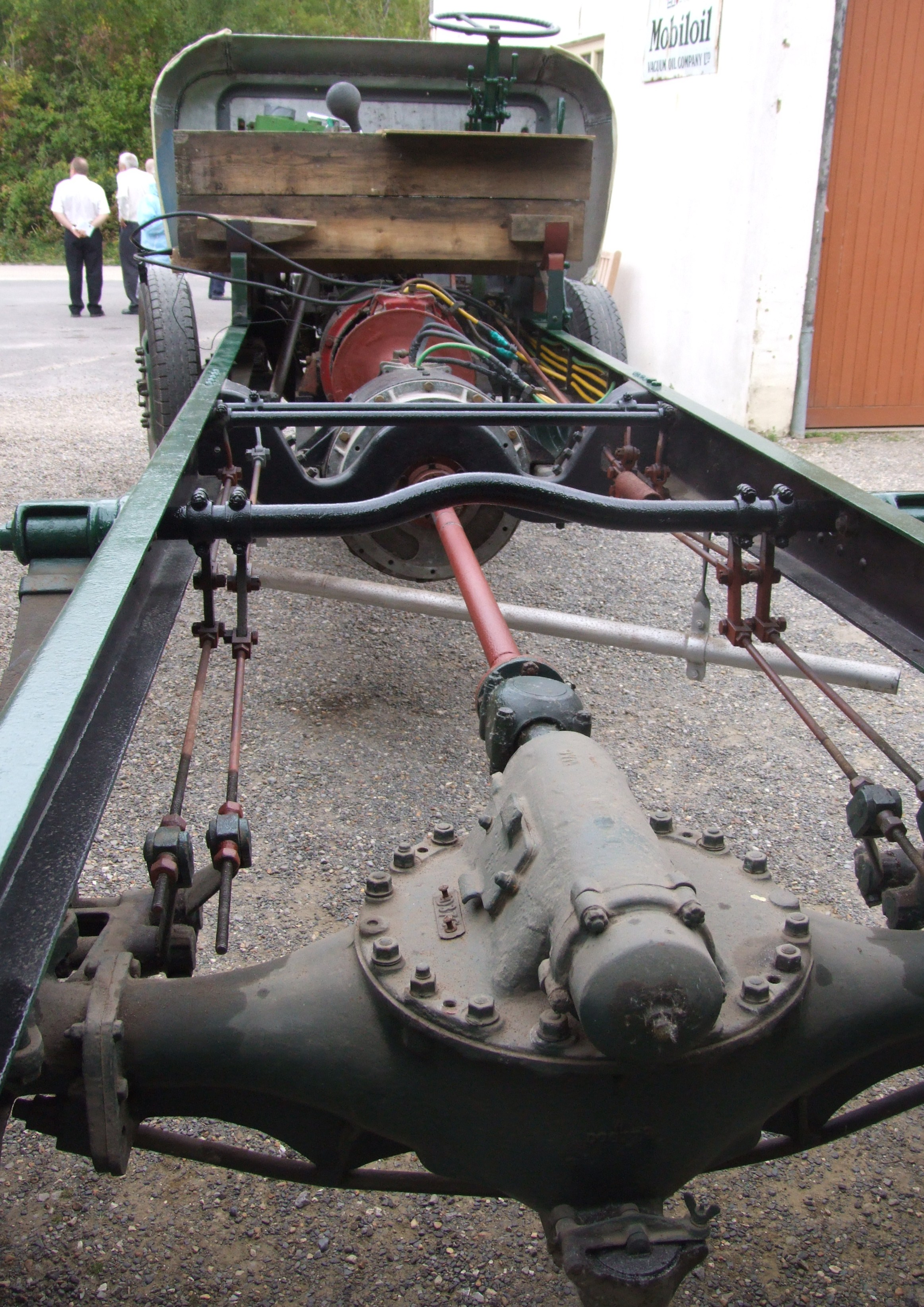
Rear axle, 1923

As the petrol engine ran continuously and its chassis weight, with a large, heavy motor–dynamo pair, was much higher than that of a mechanical gearbox, it was less fuel-efficient than a competing mechanical-transmission chassis type. Once mechanical-gearbox transmissions were developed enough to become reliable, quiet and easy enough to use, this inefficiency contributed to its demise. Another reason was the simple and fairly inefficient electrical control system, the best that could be achieved in the absence of modern electronics. However, hybrid petrol–electric cars, such as the Toyota Prius, are now seen as being a partial solution towards cutting carbon dioxide emissions, thereby contributing less to damaging global warming.

Many Tilling-Stevens Petrol Electric vehicles ended their days as mobile caravans or lorries with travelling fairs and showground people, where the electrical generation could be useful for things other than merely moving the vehicles. Some chassis survived beyond being direct road transport to become generator trailers for these fairs. This helped maintain a stock of dynamo and motor units and even chassis, making restorations possible.

== Driving a petrol–electric ==
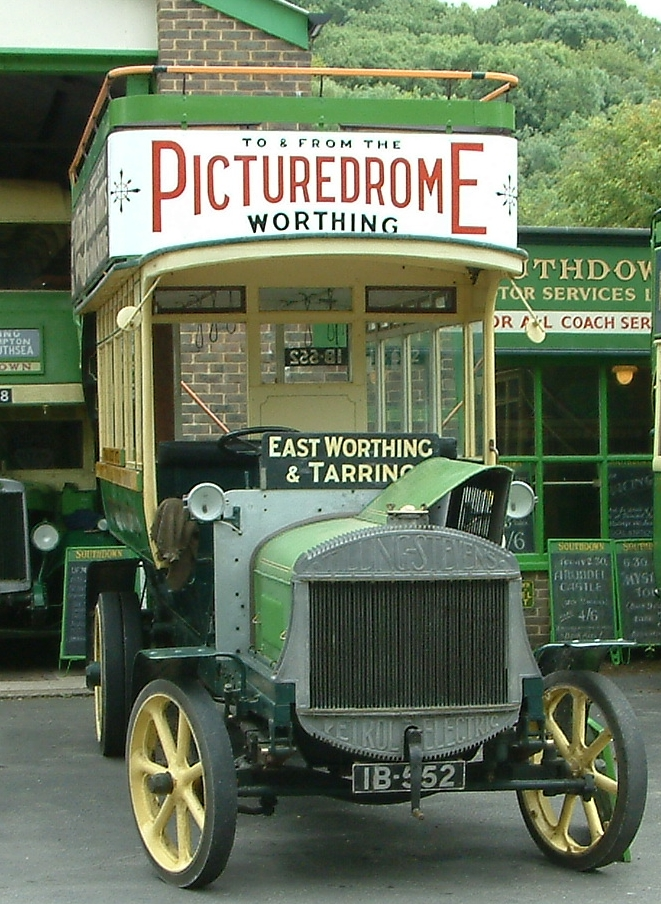
New chassis from 1914, with second-hand pre-1908 body, by Newman of London, as first combined in 1914

With the electrical generator (a large dynamo) for the motor permanently connected to the petrol engine, the early petrol–electric controls were a sprung-return throttle pedal (with a hand-operated variable latching throttle to set and adjust the idle speed), a brake pedal, a means of steering (wheel, etc.) and two, usually column-mounted, levers. One centre off lever operated a three-position changeover switch to permit running in either direction, and the other lever operated a wiper across a bank of large high-current wire-wound resistors which affected the motor and dynamo fields, to provide the electrical effect of gearing. It was very important to set the minimum possible idle speed, or when engaging the direction switch excess load on the system and possible unwanted movement would occur. The resistance "gear" lever was then set to maximum torque, and then the direction lever set to, for example, forward. On releasing the handbrake and pressing the throttle pedal slightly the vehicle will glide away smoothly. Depressing the pedal further and gradually altering the resistance lever will then produce higher speed, with none of the jerking and pauses in acceleration of a gearbox. To stop, the throttle pedal is released, the resistance lever is brought back to slow speed, the brake applied and, as rest is achieved, the forward–reverse lever moved to neutral and the handbrake applied. There is, however, no engine braking available as would be from a mechanical drive changed into a lower gear, so the system relies totally on the mechanical wheel brakes, which on early chassis applied to the rear axle only.

Apart from the throttle, engine-management controls were usually only a choke lever and ignition advance and retard for starting the hand-cranked engine. On magneto-ignition models there would be a simple switch to short the magneto and so stop the engine running.

== See also ==
- Leyland L60
