= Achates Power =

American engine developer

Achates Power is an American developer of opposed-piston, two-stroke, compression ignition engines for use in commercial and passenger vehicles. Based in San Diego, California, the company was founded in 2004 by James U Lemke.

According to Achates Power, its opposed-piston, two-stroke engine has demonstrated an increase in fuel efficiency with engine-out emissions levels sufficient to meet tailpipe emissions regulations.

In 2018, Achates Power was awarded $6,994,601 from the California Air Resources Board for the Opposed Piston Engine Class 8 Heavy Duty On-Road Demonstration. The objective of the program was to demonstrate that a heavy-duty diesel engine could meet California's ultralow NOx requirements while simultaneously increasing fuel efficiency. A 10.6L heavy-duty opposed-piston engine was installed in a Peterbilt 579 tractor and operated in fleet service by Walmart Corporation. The engine demonstrated the ability to meet every 2027 NOx emissions regulation enacted by both the United States Environmental Protection Agency and the California Air Resources Board, including new regulations for low load operation and off-cycle use. In addition, the engine demonstrated the ability to meet the 2027 EPA Green House Gas Phase 2 regulations and increased efficiency as much as 21% compared to a benchmark truck. Moreover, using the accelerated aftertreatment system aging protocol at Southwest Research Institution, the engine demonstrated the ability to meet the 2027 CARB regulations to a full useful life of 800,000 miles. Notably, these results were achieved with a conventional, underfloor aftertreatment system consisting of a diesel oxidation catalyst, a diesel particular filter, selective catalyst reduction, and an ammonia slip catalyst. No additional emissions control technology was required to achieve the ultra-low NOx levels. In 2025, the company published a technical paper at SAE World Congress summarizing these results.

In December 2012, the company announced that it had been selected as a subcontractor to AVL Powertrain Engineering, Inc. to build the next-generation combat engine for the U.S. Army. Less than a year later, in October 2013, Achates Power and Fairbanks Morse Engine signed a joint development and licensing agreement to reduce emissions and fuel consumption of Fairbanks Morse proprietary and dual-fuel opposed-piston engines. In 2017, Cummins announced that it and Achates Power had been selected by the U.S. Army to develop the 1000 hp Advanced Combat Engine based on the opposed-piston technology developed by Achates Power. The U.S. Army describes the Advanced Combat Engine as a "highly efficient, power dense engine that enables the expansion of military ground vehicle capabilities beyond current or past potential with the next-generation of propulsion power."

Achates Power is privately owned and backed by Sequoia Capital, RockPort Capital Partners, Madrone Capital Partners, Triangle Peak Partners, and Interwest Partners.

== Engine ==
The Achates Power opposed-piston engine, is modeled after the opposed-piston architecture made popular by the Junkers Jumo 205/207 aviation engines developed in the 1930s. The design positions two pistons per cylinder—working in opposite, reciprocating motion. This eliminates parts including the cylinder head and valvetrain, improving overall engine efficiency as these components are considered primary contributors to heat and friction losses. The cylinder head and valvetrain systems are also among the most complex and costly elements of conventional engines. The two-stroke cycle compounds the efficiency benefits of the opposed-piston engine architecture. With this cycle, each combustion event is shorter in duration and, therefore, closer to optimum timing as compared to four-stroke engines. Two-stroke engines are also smaller in displacement and size compared to four-stroke engines for similar performance.

While development of historic opposed-piston engines ceased for use in on-road car and truck applications with the introduction of modern emissions standards, Achates Power says that it has patented many modifications to the original architecture in order to meet current standards.

In 2025, Achates Power published a paper, along with researchers at Argonne National Labs, describing the results of direct-injection compression-ignition hydrogen combustion in a single cylinder Achates Power opposed-piston engine at Argonne National Labs. At low load conditions, stable partial-premixed charge compression ignition was achieved. At higher engine speeds and loads, mixing-controlled combustion similar to diesel combustion was achieved. Indicated thermal efficiency up to 47% was achieved.

=== Emission reduction claims ===
Achates claims that its two-stroke opposed piston engine can achieve lower emissions of nitrogen oxides (NO_{x}) than an equivalent four-stroke engine for several reasons. For example:

- The Selective catalytic reduction (SCR) system can be brought up to optimum working temperature more quickly
- Exhaust gas recirculation (EGR) can be controlled by varying the pressure differential between the inlet and exhaust manifolds

== Development timeline ==
2004: Company founded by James Lemke with investment from the late John Walton, son of Sam Walton, the founder of Wal-Mart Stores, Inc.
2005: Engine testing begins at the company's in-house test cell
2007: Series A venture capital round led by Sequoia Capital with investments from RockPort Capital Partners, Madrone Capital Partners and InterWest Partners; company receives DARPA contract to design lightweight, compact UAV engine
2008: 500 hours of testing completed
2009: Second company test cell commissioned; Series B venture capital round led with new investor, Triangle Peak Partners
2010: Engine passes NATO 50-hour cyclic durability test; over 1,000 hours of testing completed; additional test stand added to company facility
2011: Over 2,500 hours of testing completed
2012: First firing of the company's A48 opposed-piston, double crank, spur gear train engine; company surpasses 3,600 hours of total test time; along with AVL Powertrain Engineering, Inc., Achates Power is selected by the U.S. Army to develop next-generation combat engine
2013: Achates Power selected for Frost & Sullivan 2013 North American New Product Innovation Award in the medium- and heavy-duty commercial vehicle engine market; company exceeds 4,500 hours of total test time; company named first runner-up in Securing America's Future Energy (SAFE) “Energy Security Prize”; Fairbanks Morse Engine signs joint development and licensing agreement with Achates Power
2014: Achates Power engine surpasses 5,000 hours of dynamometer testing; company releases results of light-duty diesel engine study comparing its engine to a next-generation diesel engine benchmark

2015: The company is awarded a $14 million military contract by the U.S. Army Tank Automotive Research, Development and Engineering Center to help in the development of the Army's "future fighting vehicle"
