= Vijayanta =

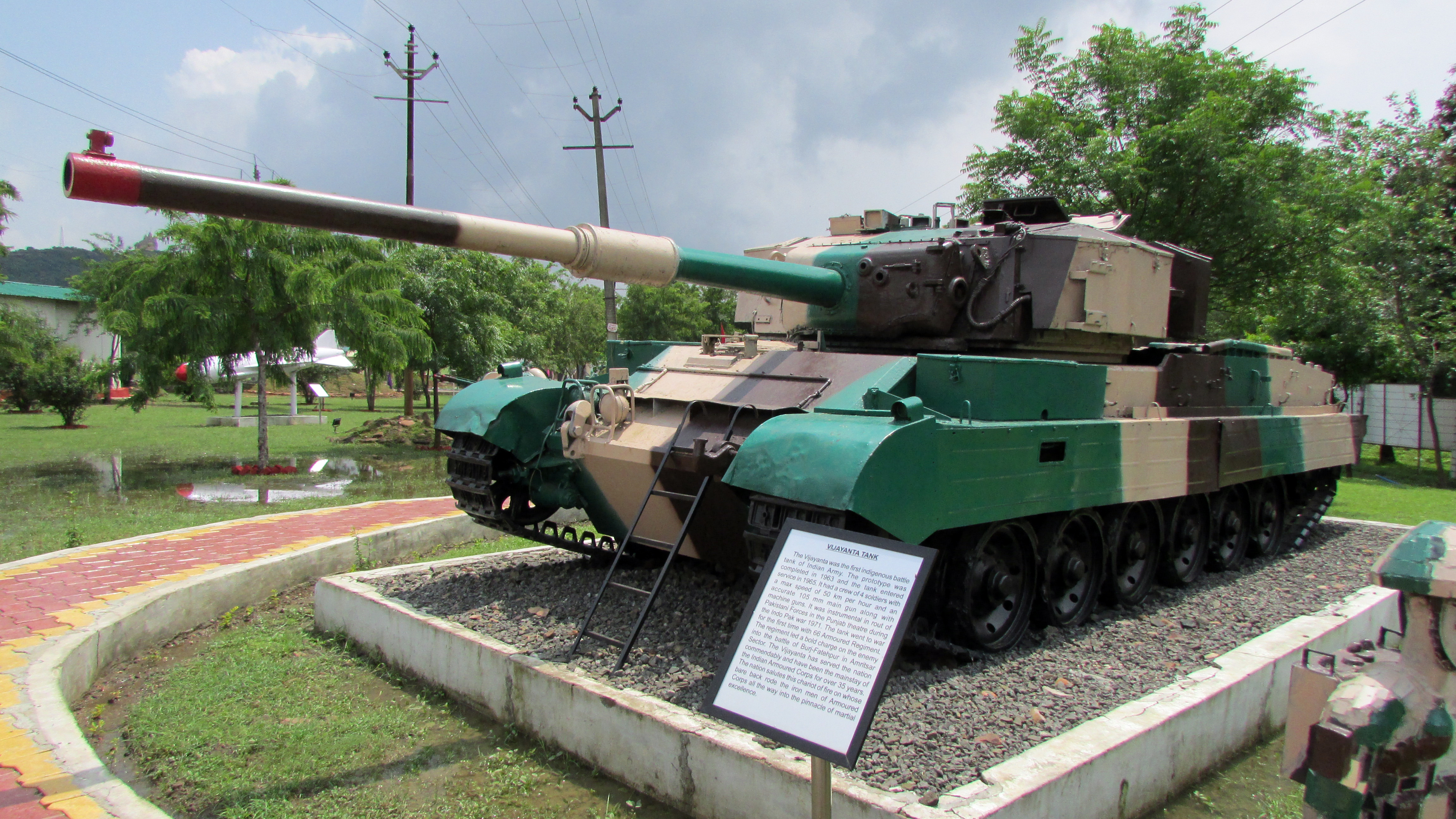
- Vijayanta MBT on static display in Bhopal
- Type: Main battle tank
- Place of origin: United Kingdom/India

Service history
- In service: 1965–present
- Used by: India
- Wars: Indo-Pakistani War of 1965; Indo-Pakistani War of 1971; Operation Bluestar; 2019 India–Pakistan standoff

Production history
- Manufacturer: Vickers-Armstrongs (Initial Production); Heavy Vehicles Factory (Indian Production)
- Produced: 1963 (Vickers Mk.1 prototype); 1965–1986 (Vijayanta production)
- No. built: 2,200

Specifications
- Mass: 39,000 kg (43 short tons)
- Length: 9.788 m (32.11 ft)
- Width: 3.168 m (10.39 ft)
- Height: 2.711 m (8.89 ft)
- Crew: 4
- Armour: 80 mm (3.1 in) steel (hull and turret front) 30 mm (1.2 in) steel (side hull)
- Main armament: 1 x 105 mm L7A2 (44 rounds)
- Secondary armament: 1 x 12.7 mm MG (ranging gun) (1000 rounds); 1 x 12.7 mm MG (pintle mount) (2000 rounds); 1 x 7.62 mm MG(Co-Ax) (500 rounds)
- Engine: Leyland L60 Diesel; 535 bhp (399 kW)
- Transmission: David Brown Ltd. (formerly Self-Changing Gears Ltd.) TN12 semi-automatic gearbox
- Suspension: Torsion bar
- Operational range: 530 km (330 mi)
- Maximum speed: 50 km/h (31 mph)

The Vijayanta (lit. 'Victorious') was a main battle tank built in India based on a licensed design of the Vickers Mk.1. The Vijayanta was the first indigenous tank of the Indian Army.

The first prototype was completed in 1963 and the tank entered service on December 29, 1965. The first 90 vehicles were built by Vickers in the UK. Production continued at the Heavy Vehicles Factory in Avadi until 1983 with 2,200 being built.

== History ==
The Vijayanta was first made in the UK before production moved to India. Indian production got underway, allowing UK production to cease.

The Vijayanta was to be phased out by the Indian Army by 2008 (the decision to phase out 296 "pre Mark 1A tanks" was already taken in 1997). In 1997 the plan to repower the Vijayanta was shelved. The overhauling of the fleet was discontinued from the year 1999–2000 as the withdrawal from service of the Vijayanta had already been approved. Bulk production of Vijayanta spares ended in 1989.

A number of the tank hulls were converted to other uses such as self-propelled guns after being withdrawn from service. The Vijayanta has been supplemented by the T-72M1 in Indian service.

In 2016, the Vijayanta was seen in commemorative postage stamps.

Retired Vijayanta tanks have been used as static artillery, and utilized in engagements along the line of control during the 2019 Indo-Pakistani standoff.

== Upgrades ==
- Vijayanta Mark 1: the first 70 tanks, later fitted with Marconi's SFCS 600 fire control system; an option for 70 additional systems was not exercised.
- Vijayanta Mark 1A: Has the Bharat Electronics Tank Fire-Control System AL 4420 with improved sight mounts and muzzle reference system. Plans called for 1100 Mark 1s to the Mark 1A standard.
- Vijayanta Mark 1B: Outfitted with the AL 4421 system which incorporates a British Barr & Stroud Tank Laser Sight and a computer to increase first round hit probability.
- Vijayanta Mark 1C: Few vehicles modified with the Vickers GBT 155 mm turret and upgraded engines, ultimately not pursued.
- Vijayanta Bison: Under the "Bison" project, there have been several attempts to upgrade the Vijayanta fleet with additional armour (the Kanchan advanced composite armour as found on the Arjun tank), a new engine (the T-72's V-84 of 780 hp), a new fire control system (the SUV-T55A), a land navigation system etc. It was planned to upgrade some 1,100 tanks but it appears that eventually only a small number was upgraded, only partially.

== Variants ==
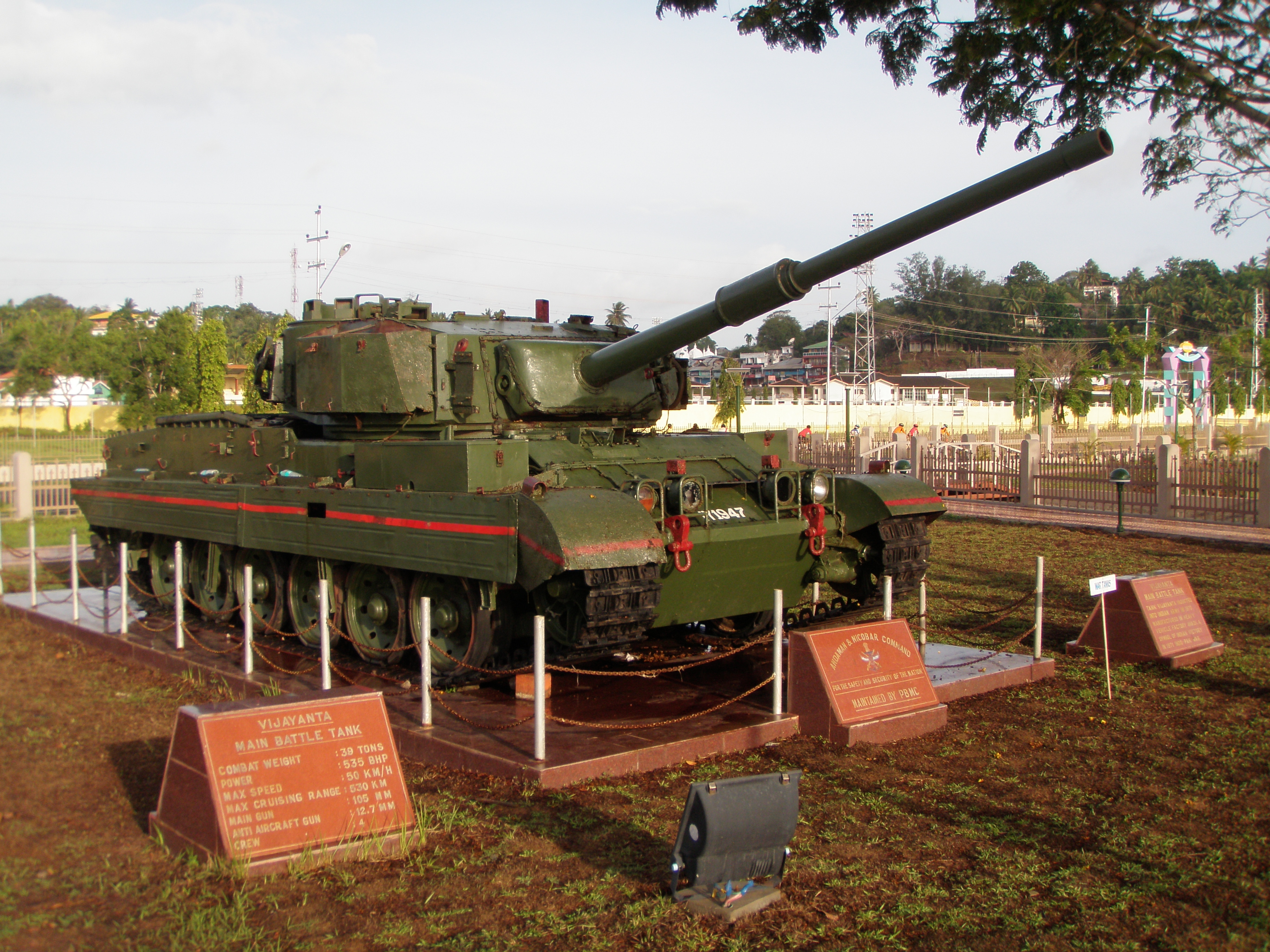
Vijayanta on static display in Port Blair

- Catapult SPA – Self-propelled artillery. A Russian M-46 field gun was mounted on a lengthened Vijayanta hull in an open-topped armoured box superstructure. The variants consists of the Catapult Mark I and Mark II, the latter having STANAG Level II ballistic protection. This was developed by Combat Vehicles Research and Development Establishment.
- Kartik AVLB – Armoured vehicle-launched bridge designed and developed by CVRDE and Research and Development Establishment, Pune. Uses the same elongated hull as the Catapult, with seven bogie wheel stations. The Kartik uses a hydraulically operated scissors-style bridge of Eastern European design, and was first introduced in 1989. The basic vehicle is powered by indigenously manufactured 6-cylinder, opposed piston, vertical in line, water cooled, two stroke CI engine with uni-flow scavenging coupled to a semiautomatic transmission with 6 forward and 2 reverse speed. Suspension is provided by trailing arm type torsion bar with all road wheel stations the vehicle also has secondary torsion bars and double acting telescope shock absorbers in the two front and rear stations. As of 2003, 34 Kartiks were produced.
- Vijayanta ARV – Armoured recovery vehicle based on the Vijayanta hull. The design was optimised to keep the weight within 40 tons to achieve a lifting capacity of 10 tons and pulling capacity of 25 tons. Around 200 numbers them have been purchased by Indian army to replace the obsolete Sherman and Centurion ARVs.
- CEASE - The Canal Embankment ASsault Equipment (CEASE) is a special type of bridging system developed by the Research & Development Establishment (Engineers) (R&DE(Engrs)), Pune. It is suitable for high bank canals up to 4.5m. as encountered in India's western borders. The project was sanction in April 1989 and cost of Rs 12.20 crores was incurred on it. Six tracked vehicles of CEASE were developed as variants of Vijayanta. As of 1998, user assisted technical evaluation of the system was completed successfully. Since the tanks on which the system had been developed became obsolescent, the Indian Army decided to opt for DRDO Sarvatra bridge.
- Vijayanta GBT 155 Turret – A Vijayanta MBT chassis fitted with the British Vickers Shipbuilding and Engineering Limited GBT 155 turret with a Royal Ordnance Nottingham 39 calibre ordnance underwent extensive firepower and mobility trials in India. This combination was not, however, adopted for service by the Indian Army.
