= M-46 Catapult =

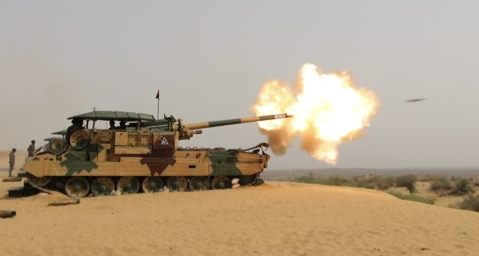
- Type: Self-propelled artillery
- Place of origin: India

Service history
- In service: 1981-2021
- Used by: India

Production history
- No. built: 100-170 depending on source

Specifications
- Caliber: 130 mm
- Breech: Horizontal sliding wedge
- Elevation: -2.5° to 45°
- Maximum firing range: 27 km
- Main armament: 130 mm M-46 field gun
- Engine: Diesel
- Suspension: torsion bar

The M-46 Catapult was a self-propelled artillery gun developed in India by Combat Vehicles Research & Development Establishment of the Defence Research & Development Organisation.

== Description ==
The turret-less vehicle has an open area in the centre for the gun and crew but retains the driver's position and includes a horizontal metal shield for overhead protection.

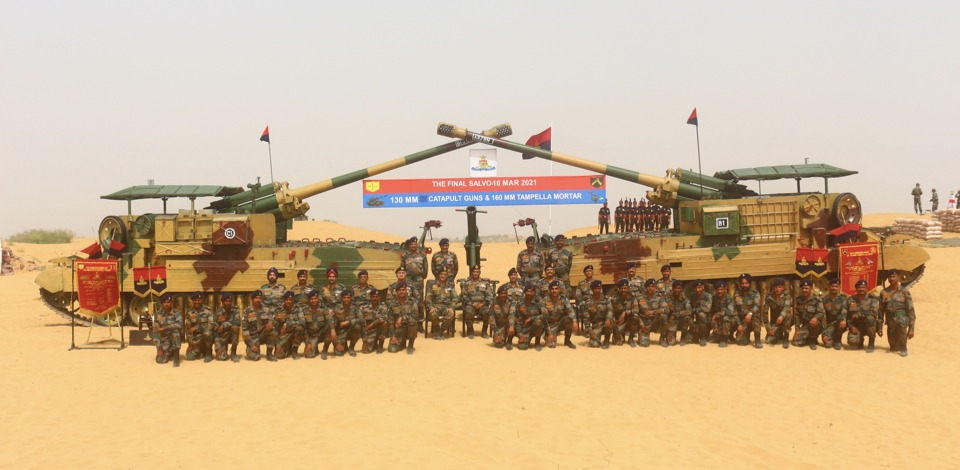
130 mm Self Propelled M-46 Catapult Guns decommissioning ceremony, March 2021

To withstand higher firing stresses and to cater for longer recoil the Vijayanta tank's hull has been elongated with seven bogie wheel stations on either side. The stability to the vehicle during firing is provided by unique hydraulic suspension locking system. The self-propelled medium artillery gun can fire both HE and AP ammunition and has a maximum range of 27 km. The gun has a limited static traverse 12½% on either side and an elevation of +45% to -2%. The system can stow 30 rounds of separate loading ammunition.

== Development ==
After the 1965 and 1971 wars between India and Pakistan, the Army was in search of mobile (self propelled) artillery gun systems, primarily for the strike formations on the western borders. The production of Catapult guns began in the late 1970s and they were inducted in 1981. The platform is based on the Soviet 130 mm M-46 field gun mounted on a lengthened hull of the ageing British/Indian Vijayanta tank. A total of 100 M-46 Catapult systems were built and are being replaced by an unspecified number and type of 155mm self-propelled howitzers and K-9 Vajra gun systems.

== Operational history ==
The guns never saw combat, though they were deployed during Operation Parakram in 2001 at Samba district of Jammu and Kashmir — in the chicken neck area and Shakargarh bulge and during Operation Zafran after the Pulwama terror attack. It was retired from service on 16 March 2021 after 40 years of active service with the Indian Army.

== See also ==
- 130 mm Catapult on the Arjun Mk 1 chassis
