= James U. Lemke =

Entrepreneur, inventor, physicist (b. 1930, d. 2019)

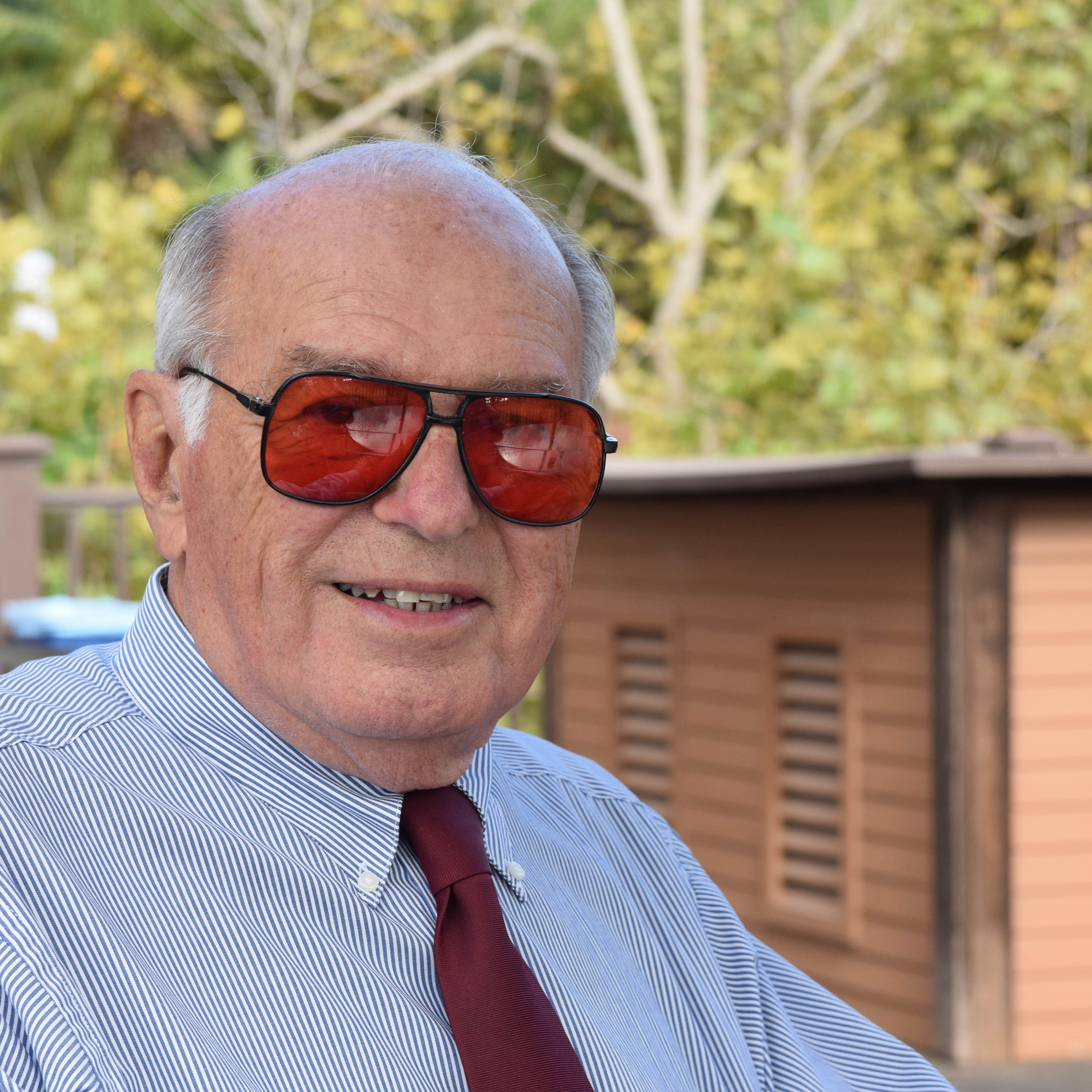
- Lemke in 2015
- Born: December 26, 1929; Grand Rapids, Michigan, US
- Died: February 22, 2019 (aged 89); La Jolla, California, US
- Education: Illinois Institute of Technology (BS); Northwestern University (MS); U. C. Santa Barbara (PhD)
- Occupations: Entrepreneur, Inventor, Physicist
- Spouse: Ann Raiguel Stickley (m.1930)

James "Jim" U. Lemke (December 26, 1929 - February 22, 2019) was an American physicist and entrepreneur who lived in San Diego. He developed magnetic recording and internal combustion engine technologies.

Lemke started six high-tech research & development companies, owned and flew multiple airplanes and was awarded more than 114 U.S. and foreign patents in the fields of information theory, magnetic materials, information storage devices, aviation, and internal combustion engines.

He was a member of the National Academy of Engineering, Fellow of the Institute of Electrical and Electronics Engineers, Fellow of the American Association for the Advancement of Science, Fellow of Eastman Kodak Research Laboratories, Senior Fellow of the California Council on Science and Technology, and a Member of the American Physical Society.

== Background and education ==
Lemke was born in Grand Rapids, Michigan on December 26, 1929. He was the son of Andrew Lemke, a Congregationalist minister.

Lemke earned his undergraduate degree in physics from Illinois Institute of Technology in 1959, his master's degree in physics (Woodrow Wilson Fellow) from Northwestern University in 1960, and his Ph.D. in theoretical physics from U.C. Santa Barbara in 1966. He credits Bill Mahavier and John Neuberger, instructors at Illinois Institute of Technology, with launching him on "a lifetime adventure in science and technology".

== Career ==
In 1948, Lemke joined the new IBM Watson Scientific Computing Laboratory at Columbia University and spent three years working on plated drum memories for IBM computers. He joined T.E.M.C.O, working on high-speed teletype encryption devices before moving to AV Manufacturing Company in New York as the vice-president of engineering, developing multi-track instrumentation recorders. In 1957, he joined Armour Research Foundation to coordinate the work on magnetic recording.

In 1960, Lemke joined the Bell and Howell Research Center in Pasadena, California as the director of magnetic research. He worked on the development of high-density instrumentation and PCM recorders and in magnetics research.

In 1968, Lemke founded Spin-Physics in San Diego to develop magnetic recording heads for broadcast TV tape recorders. Once 50 percent of the broadcast hours on television worldwide were recorded on Spin Physics’ magnetic heads. In 1973, Lemke sold the company to Eastman Kodak and became a fellow of the Kodak Research Laboratories. He founded Recording Physics, Inc. and VISqUS, Corp. VISqUS offered a technology based on a head-disk air bearing, but with the air replaced by a liquid.

In 1978, Lemke founded Aerolift to manufacture a through-the-propeller radar for single-engine airplanes that he had invented.

Four years later, in 1982, Lemke was pivotal in establishing the Center for Magnetic Recording Research (CMRR) at UC San Diego. Lemke obtained corporate donations for a new building for the center and could secure funding for four endowed professorships and for scientific equipment.

From 1982, Lemke served as an adjunct professor at the University of California, San Diego.

In 2004, Lemke founded Achates Power to pursue the development of the two-cycle, opposed-piston internal combustion engine.

Lemke authored several scientific papers and wrote a book chapter on instrumentation recording. He was a prolific inventor with over 100 U.S. patents to his name.

== Awards and memberships ==
- Member of the American Physical Society, he also was a Fellow of the IEEE.
- Senior Fellow of the California Council on Science and Technology
- 1988, Member of the National Academy of Engineering for lifelong leadership in magnetic recording theory and practice
- 1992, IEEE Magnetics Society Distinguished Lecturer.
- 1993, Revelle medal for distinguished and sustained service to UCSD.
- 1995, IEEE Reynold B. Johnson Storage Award for "contributions to advancing the science and technology of high-density magnetic data storage."
- 2004, Fellow of the American Association for the Advancement of Science.

== Personal Interests ==
Lemke owned and flew several planes. In 1981, in Ted Gildred's recreation of his father's 1942 flight from San Diego to Quito, Ecuador, Lemke flew as the safety "chaser" in his twin-engined Beech Baron. Achates Power was founded with the aim of building an opposed-piston aircraft engine.

Lemke was married to Ann Stickley who he met in Greenwich Village in New York City in 1953. He had two daughters, Catherine and Susan, and a son, Michael. He was predeceased by his parents, Andrew and Frances Lemke, and by his sister Lois Dahl.
