= Leyland L60 =

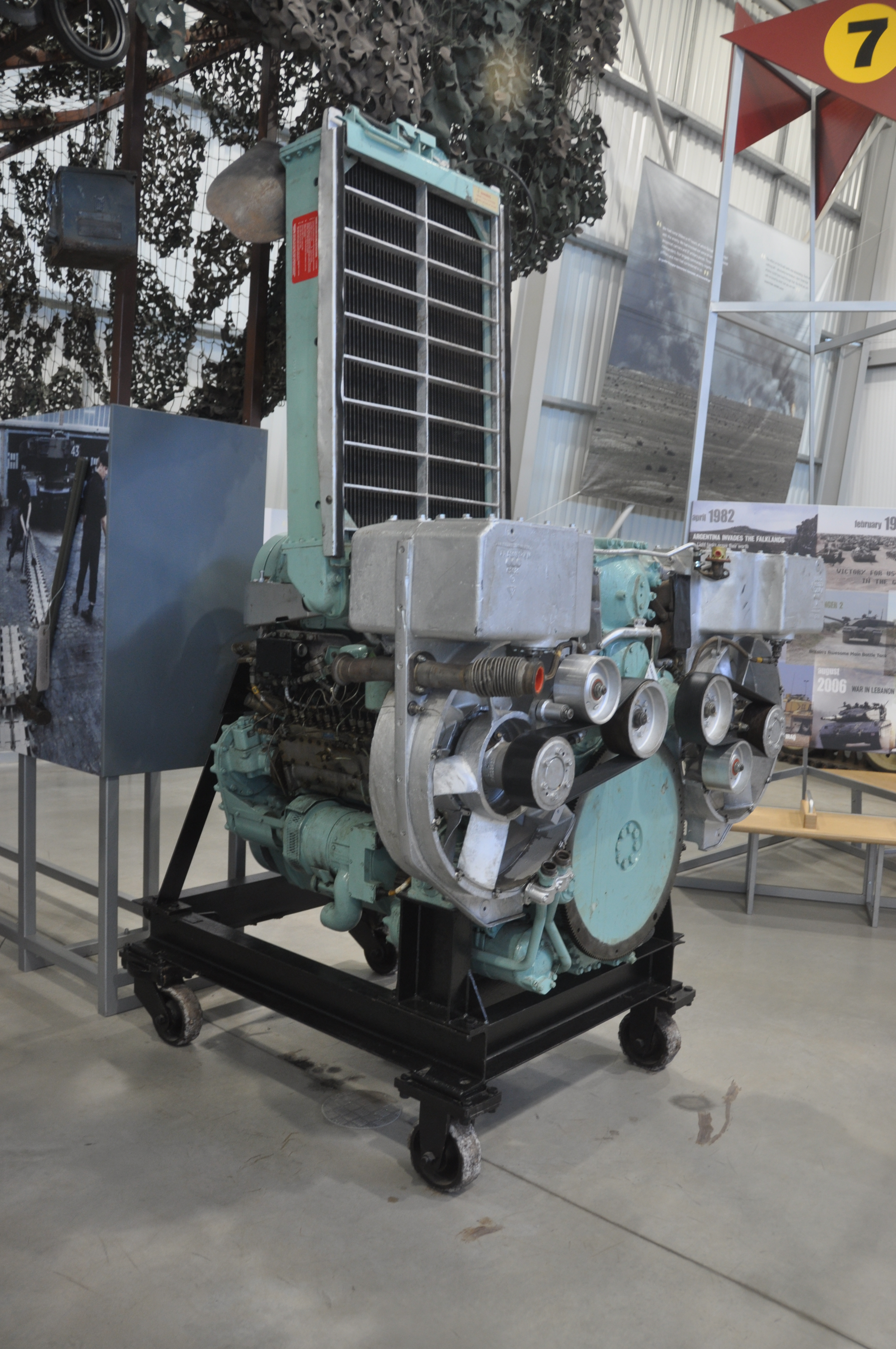
- Leyland L60 engine pack with one of the radiators in the raised position displayed at the Bovington tank museum

Overview
- Manufacturer: Leyland Motors

Layout
- Configuration: Six-cylinder, twelve-piston opposed-piston engine
- Displacement: 19 litres (1,200 cu in)
- Cylinder bore: 117.5 mm (4.63 in)
- Piston stroke: 146.1 mm (5.75 in)
- Valvetrain: Valveless
- Compression ratio: 16:1

Combustion
- Supercharger: Roots (scavenge blower)
- Fuel type: Diesel
- Oil system: Dry sump
- Cooling system: Water-cooled

Output
- Power output: 650 brake horsepower (480 kW) at 2,100 rpm (L60 No.4, Mk 4A); 750 brake horsepower (560 kW) (L60 MK 7A)
- Torque output: 1,460 lb⋅ft (1,980 N⋅m) at 1,320 rpm (L60 No.4, Mk 4A)

The Leyland L60 was a British 19-litre (1,200 cu in) vertical six-cylinder opposed-piston two-stroke multi-fuel diesel engine designed by Leyland Motors in the late 1950s/early 1960s for the Chieftain main battle tank (MBT). The engine was also used in the Vickers MBT and its Indian-built derivative, the Vijayanta.

== Development ==
The initial engine choice in 1954 for what was known at the time as "Medium Gun Tank No.2", later designated the "FV4201" and given the service name 'Chieftain', was a Rolls-Royce diesel V8, however during the Chieftain's design phase NATO introduced a policy in 1957 requiring all armoured fighting vehicles to have a multi-fuel capability. This left the Rolls-Royce engine an unsuitable option and so a new engine with this capability was required. (Note: NATO later rescinded this requirement. As events turned out, in service the L60 was normally run on diesel fuel (DERV) but on exercise would also be operated on Avgas (petrol), Avtag, Avtur (jet fuel), or whatever was available, e.g., domestic heating oil. The L60 would run without preparation on any fuel, or combination of fuels, of sufficient calorific value and low enough viscosity to pass through the injectors.) (Note: facing the same requirement West Germany developed the Daimler-Benz MB837, an 8-cylinder multi-fuel engine of approximately the same power as the L60. The engine was trialled in an M47 Patton before the NATO multi-fuel requirement was cancelled.)

Leyland Motors, under the direction of the Fighting Vehicles Research and Development Establishment (FVRDE) at Chertsey, was asked to develop an opposed-piston two-stroke diesel of similar design to those previously produced by Napier (Note: The Napier company had earlier licensed some of Junkers Motorenwerke's (Jumo's) opposed-piston diesel aircraft engine designs such as the Junkers Jumo 205.) and Rootes Group, the latter's Commer TS3 (Note: By this time Tilling-Stevens had been bought out by Rootes.) engine being particularly highly regarded.

This configuration, apart from being well-suited to multi-fuel use, also had the advantages of being of simple design with a low parts count, had low bearing loads, and possessed good cold-starting characteristics. Some technical assistance was provided to Leyland by Rolls-Royce, who by that time was a parent to the Napier aero-engine company, Napier itself remained a subsidiary of English Electric. (Note: The intended estimated design weight for FV4201 was at this time 47 tons) Both Tilling-Stevens and Leyland produced single-cylinder prototype engines for the tank engine project and by 1959 the resulting complete engine design had become the Leyland 60, or L60, with the first engine running that same year. (Note: Rolls-Royce would use the opposed-piston two-stroke design in its K60 engine, used in the FV430 series of vehicles.)

== Overview ==
One of the reasons the L60's unusual configuration was chosen was so as to obtain as compact a power plant as possible so allowing the height of the vehicle to be kept as low as was practicable, a requirement for the Chieftain's design philosophy which was also seen in the recumbent driver's position.

The use of the two-stroke cycle allowed for a greater power for a given displacement, a 19-litre diesel engine being expected to be capable of around the same power as the 600 hp 27-litre petrol Meteor tank engine (Note: Design target for the L60 was actually 600 hp for initial engines, 700 hp with development, the latter programme being carried out under the code name "Fleetfoot".) whilst taking up less room in the engine compartment. Scavenging, necessary in a large two-stroke diesel for evacuating the cylinders of exhaust gases, was performed by a Roots blower.

== Maintenance ==
The Chieftain's L60 engine and cooling system were designed into an integrated engine-pack which could be changed "in the field" using the crane of an FV434 Armoured Repair Vehicle, which had been designed for this purpose and a complete engine change took around one-and-a-half, to 2 hours.

The requirement for an easily changeable engine pack was the result of a British Army analysis of previous tank battles that concluded that a likely future tank battle would last no longer than two hours and so the most demanding requirement expected for any tank engine during wartime would be for it to be run at full power for this total amount of time only and so it would then be advantageous for it to be removed from the vehicle after the battle and exchanged for a fresh engine within a minimum of time. (Note: By comparison changing the engine on the earlier Centurion was a complicated procedure that took around twelve hours.)

This would also allow the engines to be worked on in properly equipped REME workshops rather than 'in the field', the engines being exchanged between vehicles and workshops as-and-when required. (Note: The context here is a battlefield possibly contaminated by nuclear, biological, or chemical (NBC) weapons, and with personnel not protected by being inside vehicles having to wear protective clothing at all times. In these conditions, any involved or intricate work outside, on an engine or other system, is simply not possible.) This philosophy was also applied to the contemporary FV430 series of vehicles.

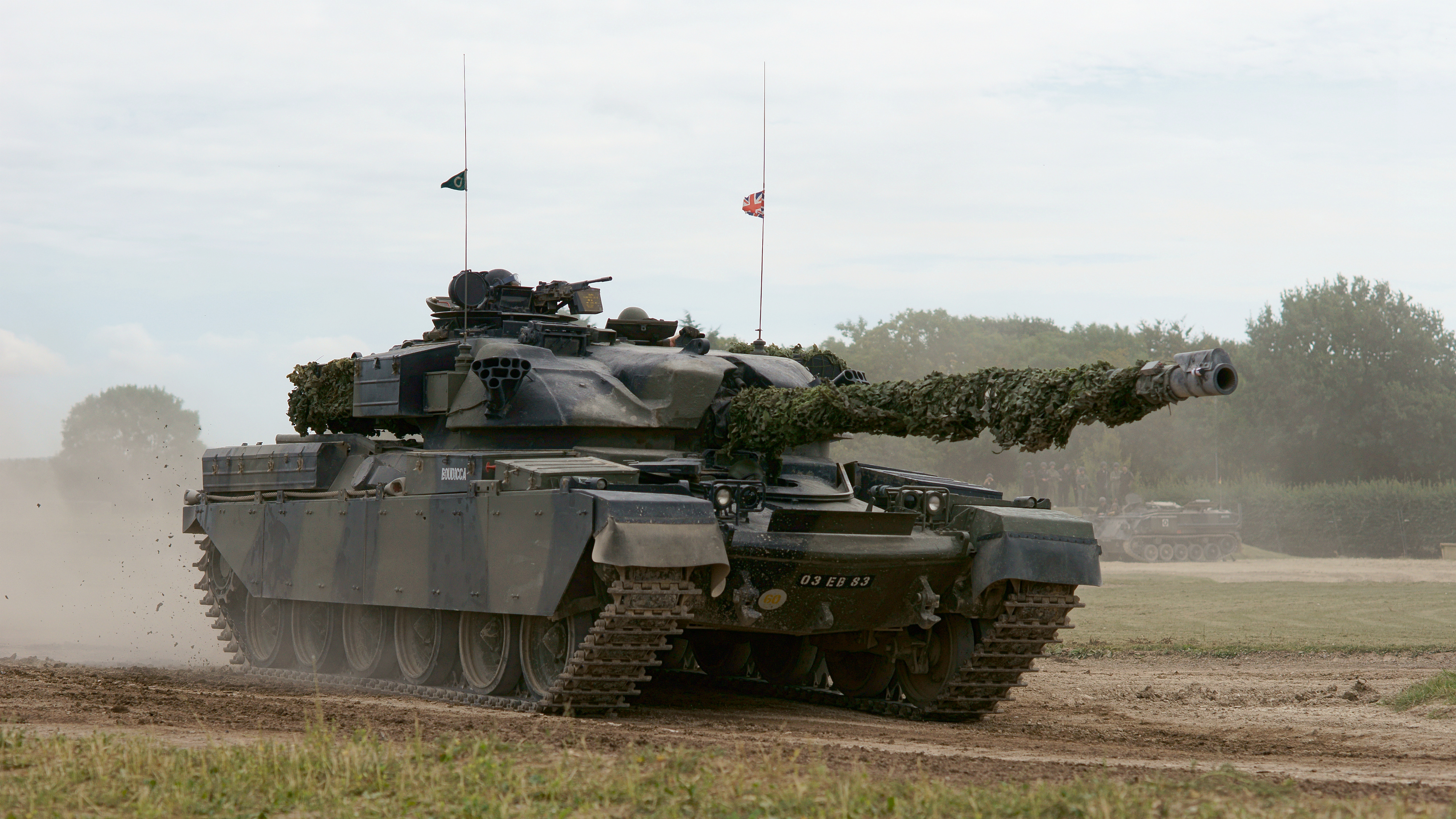
The Chieftain

== Performance ==
The initial production L60 units were, at 585 bhp at 2,100 rpm, down on the designed initial power of 600 bhp and were plagued with reliability problems. These problems were exacerbated during the Chieftain's introduction by initially an inadequate spares stock and an insufficient spare engine "float". (Note: i.e., meaning a stock of spare engines available for immediate fitment to broken-down vehicles. Initial Leyland L60 production was earmarked for new vehicles being built at the factories.) The L60 reliability problem would have been far worse had it not been for the removable engine pack, which usually allowed a vehicle to be operational again with a replacement engine within a couple of hours of breaking down. A persistent source of trouble was the failure of the cylinder liner sealing resulting in coolant leakage into the cylinder bore. Fan drive belts overstressed fan bearing housings in the crankcase leading to cracking. Reliability did improve over time with modifications and improvement programmes, such as the "Sundance" programme which also improved power output. Sundance was carried out in five main phases between 1976 and 1979. Sundance had been preceded by "Dark Morn", "High Noon", and the initial "Fleetfoot" engine development programme – the person responsible for the choosing of code names apparently being an admirer of Western film. The Sundance programme was the subject of parliamentary questions in the House of Commons in 1978. With the final rectification of most of the L60's previous reliability and power problems, vehicle availability levels rose to 80%. In the 1990 Gulf War Chieftain AARV and CHAVRE availability levels exceeded those of the Challenger 1 tank which had by that point replaced Chieftain, using more-conventional four-stroke V12 diesels. (Note: The increased reliability that "Sundance" provided however allowed other problems to emerge that had not made themselves felt before, such as the draining of oil from the upper-crankshaft bearings when the engine stood for long periods, requiring the operators to crank the engine for 20 seconds before starting from cold, and rectification measures such as fitting non-return valves to prevent the oil draining back to the sump were only partially successful.)

Final production engines produced 750 bhp (560 kW) following a series of modifications to engines in service under the various improvement programmes.

Initially, due to unfamiliarity with the two-stroke engine's different exhaust note and power band compared to a four-stroke engine, and with the resulting difficulty in choosing the correct gear required for the particular driving task, trainee drivers tended to under-rev the engines and use inappropriate gear selections, leading to great difficulty climbing gradients, and when the Chieftain Mk 1 was first introduced some drivers had difficulty climbing the vehicle onto the trailers of Thornycroft Antar tank transporters.

== L60 variants ==
- Mark 1 - Mark 4, prototype engines completed 1959 to 1965, 60 built
- Mark 4A, first production variant, January 1965, producing 585 bhp. Used in Chieftain Mk 1 which were used for training duties at Bovington Camp and Catterick Garrison.
- Mark 4A2, Mark 4A with a new piston crown, (Note: The L60 utilised a piston with a separate crown.) produced 650 bhp, November 1965
- Mark 4B, de-rated Mark 4A2 for Vickers MBT/Vijayanta which was some 17-18 tons lighter than Chieftain. In this vehicle the L60 suffered fewer reliability problems. 540 bhp
- Mark 5A, modified piston with oil cell and offset bowl, new sump, pressure-lubricated fan bearings, 650 bhp, introduced in April 1969 for the Chieftain Mk. 3.
- Mark 6A, produced October 1970 featuring a two-stage air cleaner, 650 bhp. Fitted to Chieftain Mk. 3(S) « Sandman »
- Mark 7A, produced from October 1971, culmination of initial "Fleetfoot" development programme, three-lobe scavenger blower, new cylinder block with re-positioned fan belt deflectors, re-designed liners, new radiators, Belzona sealant used on liner seals, increased power to 720 bhp. For Chieftain Mk. 5, Mk. 3/2 and Mk 3/3.
- Mark 8A, two-lobe scavenger blower, commercial version for general sale to customers other than the British Army of Mark 7A, new shot-peened liner material, new pistons, increased power to 750 bhp. Used in Chieftain Mk 5, the last Chieftain production variant. Later Marks were upgrades of existing vehicles.
- Mark 9A, June 1977 "Dark Morn" modifications including new liner material, new pistons and piston rings with improved oil cooling, new fan drives, 750 bhp.
- Mark 10A, export version of Mark 9A with two-lobe scavenger blower. Mark 10A engines had additional air cleaning for the desert environment in Iran.
- Mark 11A - Mark 12A, "Sundance" modifications to fix reliability issues, block/liner sealing O-ring retained by interference-fitted liners, new injectors, CAV fuel filters, Poly-V fan drive belts, introduced March 1978, increased power to 750 bhp. Target 4,000-mile engine life achieved by December 1978. (Note: Mark 11A engines and Mark 13A engines had a three-lobe scavenger blower, Mark 12A engines and Mark 14A engines a two-lobe scavenger blower.)
- Mark 11A/N - Mark 12A/N, August 1979 designations for modified Mark 11A and Mark 12A engines using no O-ring on cylinder liners.
- Mark 13A - Mark 14A, April 1980 re-designations of Mark 11A/N - Mark 12A/N engines, 750 bhp

In 1975 all British Chieftains were brought up to Chieftain Mark 5 standard as part of the "Totem Pole" programme which included the fitting of all vehicles with the 750 bhp L60 Mark 8A. On undergoing "Totem Pole" upgrades Chieftain Mk 2 vehicles were re-designated the Mark 6. Mk 3 vehicles became the Mk 7, and Mk 3/3 vehicles became the Mk 8.

== Transmission ==
The engine was mated with a Merritt-Brown TN12 (Note: The gearbox used a steering system devised in 1935 by H. E. Merritt, then-Director of Tank Design at Woolwich Arsenal) triple-differential epicyclic gearbox providing "regenerative" steering, a derivative of the system first used on the Churchill tank. The gearbox was semi-automatic foot-operated and had six forward, and two reverse gears, power being transmitted to it via a centrifugal clutch. Like the engine, the gearbox was designed to be quickly replaceable. The TN12 had originally been developed for the cancelled FV300 light tank series. A scaled down version of the TN12, the TN15, was used in the CVR(T) series of vehicles. (Note: When installed in the early Chieftains with L60s of around 600 bhp the initial TN12 gearbox design suffered from overheating and proved insufficiently robust, having been designed for a vehicle of lower weight and power. The overheating was cured by increasing the oil flow and fitting a heat exchanger, while the gearbox itself was redesigned to make it stronger, the resulting increase in gearbox size making it necessary to relocate the previously internal engine bay engine silencers to an armoured external box at the rear of the hull.)

== Use ==
- Chieftain tank
- Vickers MBT
- Vijayanta
