= Opposed-piston engine =

Combustion engine using disks compressing fuel in the same cylinder

A 1914 Simpson's balanced two-stroke engine

An opposed-piston engine is a piston engine in which each cylinder has a piston at both ends, and no cylinder head. Petrol and diesel opposed-piston engines have been used mostly in large applications such as ships, military tanks, and factories. Current manufacturers of opposed-piston engines include Cummins, Achates Power, and Fairbanks-Morse Defense (FMDefense).

== Design ==
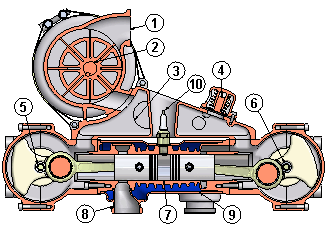
Schematic of a supercharged opposed-piston engine: 1. Intake for fuel-air mixture; 2. Supercharger; 3. Airbox; 4. Boost relief valve; 5. Outlet crankshaft; 6. Inlet crank mechanism; 7. Cylinder with inlet and outlet slots; 8. Exhaust; 9. Water cooling jacket; 10. Spark plug

Compared to contemporary two-stroke engines, which use a conventional design of one piston per cylinder, the advantages of the opposed-piston engine are:

- Eliminating the cylinder head and valve-train, which reduces weight, complexity, cost, heat loss, and friction loss of the engine.
- Creating a uniflow-scavenged movement of gas through the combustion chamber, which avoided the drawbacks originally associated with the crossflow-scavenged designs of early piston-engines.
- A reduced height of the engine

The main drawback was that the two opposing pistons had to be geared together. This added weight and complexity when compared to conventional piston engines, which use a single crankshaft as the power output.

The most common layout was two crankshafts, with the crankshafts geared together (in either the same direction or opposing directions). The Koreyvo, Jumo, and Napier Deltic engines used one piston per cylinder to expose an intake port, and the other to expose an exhaust port. Each piston is referred to as either an intake piston or an exhaust piston, depending on its function in this regard. This layout gives superior scavenging, as gas flow through the cylinder is axial rather than radial, and simplifies design of the piston crowns. In the Jumo 205 and its variants, the upper crankshaft serves the exhaust pistons, and the lower crankshaft the intake pistons. In designs using multiple cylinder banks, each big end bearing serves one inlet and one exhaust piston, using a forked connecting rod for the exhaust piston.

== History ==
=== 1880s to 1930s ===
Animation of the Atkinson differential engine

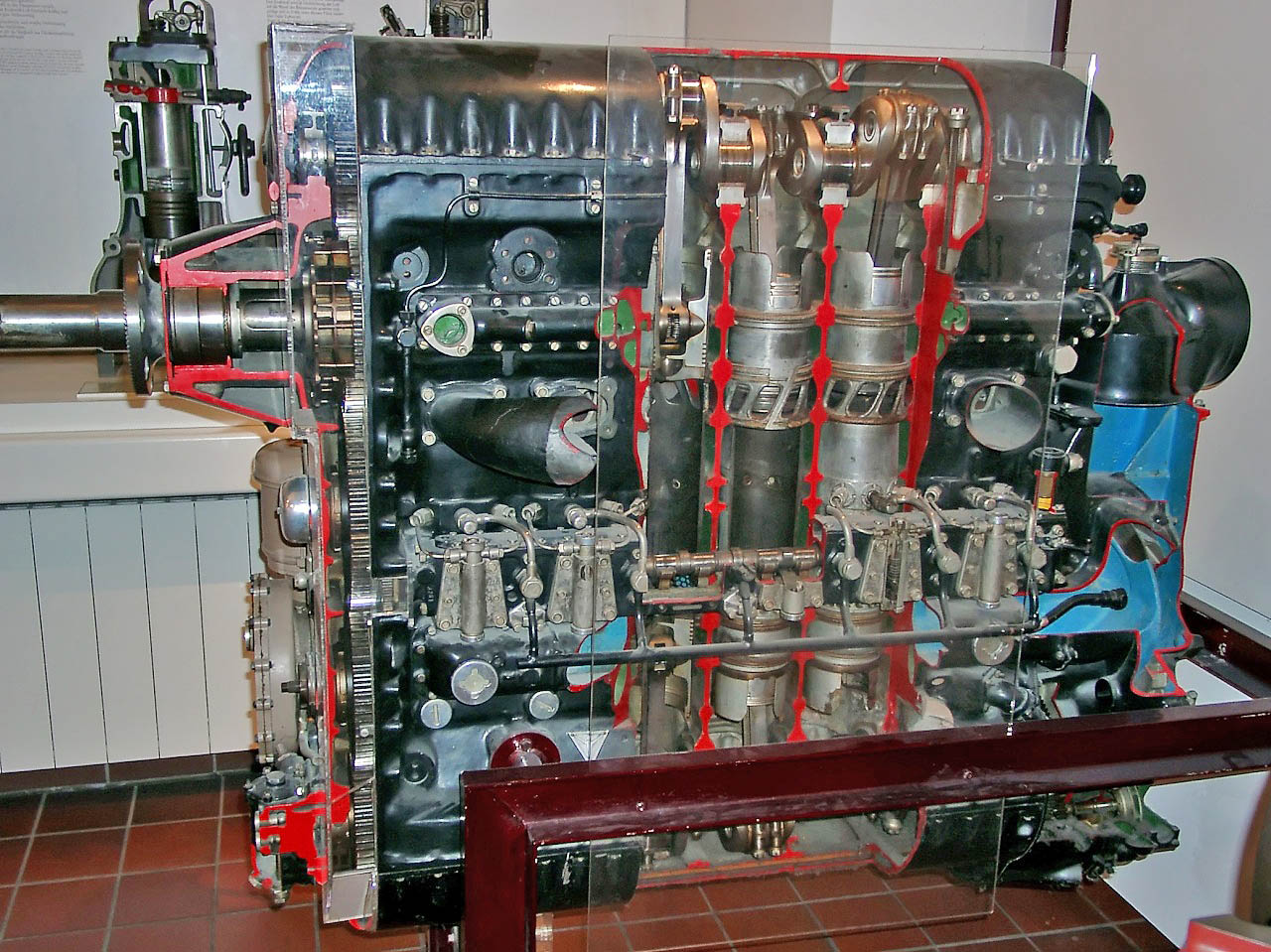
1932 Junkers Jumo 205 diesel aircraft engine

One of the first opposed-piston engines was the 1882 Atkinson differential engine, which has a power stroke on every rotation of the crankshaft (compared with every second rotation for the contemporary Otto cycle engine), but it was not a commercial success.

In 1898, an Oechelhäuser two-stroke opposed-piston engine producing 600 hp (447 kW) was installed at the Hoerde ironworks. This design of engine was also produced under licence by manufacturers including Deutsche Kraftgas Gesellschaft in Germany and William Beardmore & Sons in the United Kingdom.

In 1901, the Kansas City Lightning Balanced Gas and Gasoline Engines were gasoline engines producing 4–25 hp (3–19 kW).

An early opposed-piston car engine was produced by the French company Gobron-Brillié around 1900. On 31 March 1904, a Gobron-Brillié car powered by the opposed-piston engine was the first car ever to exceed 150 km/h with a "World's Record Speed" of 152.54 km/h (95 mph). On 17 July 1904, the Gobron-Brillié car became the first to exceed 100 mph (161 km/h) for the flying kilometre. The engine used a single crankshaft at one end of the cylinders and a crosshead for the opposing piston.

Another early opposed piston car engine was in the Scottish Arrol-Johnston car, which appears to have been first installed in their 10 hp buckboard c1900. The engine was described and illustrated in some detail in the account of their 12-15 hp car exhibited at the 1905 Olympia Motor-Show. The engine was a four-stroke with two cylinders (with opposed pistons in each) with the crankshaft underneath and the pistons connected by lever arms to the two-throw crankshaft.

The first diesel engine with opposed pistons was a prototype built at Kolomna Locomotive Works in Russia. The designer, Raymond A. Koreyvo, patented the engine in France on 6 November 1907 and displayed the engine at international exhibitions, but it did not reach production. The Kolomna design used a typical layout of two crankshafts connected by gearing.

In 1914, the Simpson's Balanced Two-Stroke motorcycle engine was another opposed-piston engine using a single crankshaft beneath the centre of the cylinders with both pistons connected by levers. This engine was a crankcase compression design, with one piston used to uncover the transfer port, and the other to open the exhaust port. The advantage of this design was to avoid the deflector crowns for pistons used by most two-stroke engines at that time.

Doxford Engine Works in the United Kingdom built large opposed-piston engines for marine use, with the first Doxford engine being installed in a ship in 1921. This diesel engine used a single crankshaft at one end of the cylinders and a crosshead for the opposing piston. After World War I, these engines were produced in a number of models, such as the P and J series, with outputs as high as 20,000 hp (14,914 kW). Production of Doxford engines in the UK ceased in 1980.

Later opposed-piston diesel engines include the 1932 Junkers Jumo 205 aircraft engine built in Germany, which had two crankshafts, not using a design similar to the 1900–1922 Gobron-Brillié engines.

From 1933 to 1938, Lancia had licensed Junkers design and implemented the opposed pistons layout for their Tipo 89 engine for use in the Lancia Ro NM military truck. It displaced 3,180 cc (194 cu in), used four horizontally opposed pistons, and was a two-stroke diesel. Eventually Lancia added on another two horizontally opposed pistons to the design, displacing 4,770 cc (291 cu in), and was named the Tipo 90 to power the updated Lancia Ro-Ro truck. Once the Lancia Ro was replaced by the Lancia 3Ro in 1939, the company switched to a more conventional inline five cylinder diesel; the first inline five cylinder diesel to be fitted to an automobile.

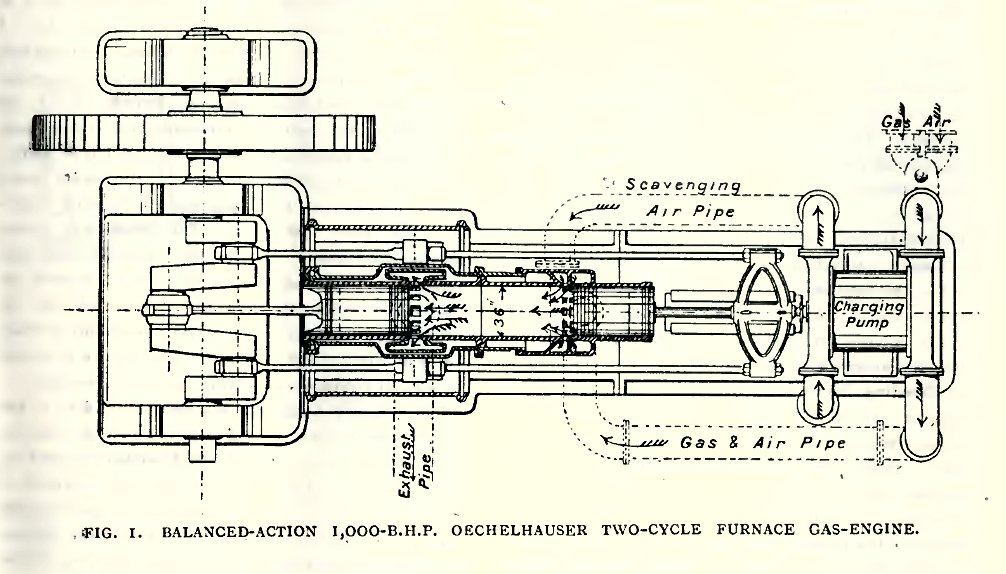
1898 Oechelhäuser gas engine

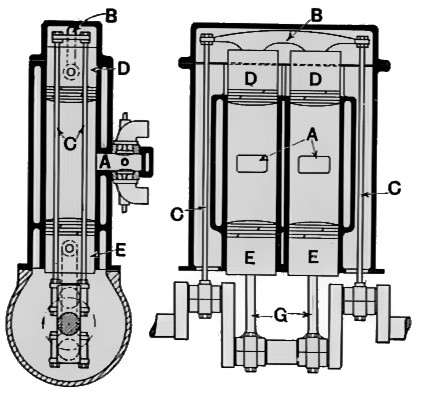
1900 Gobron-Brillié opposed-piston engine with overhung yoke

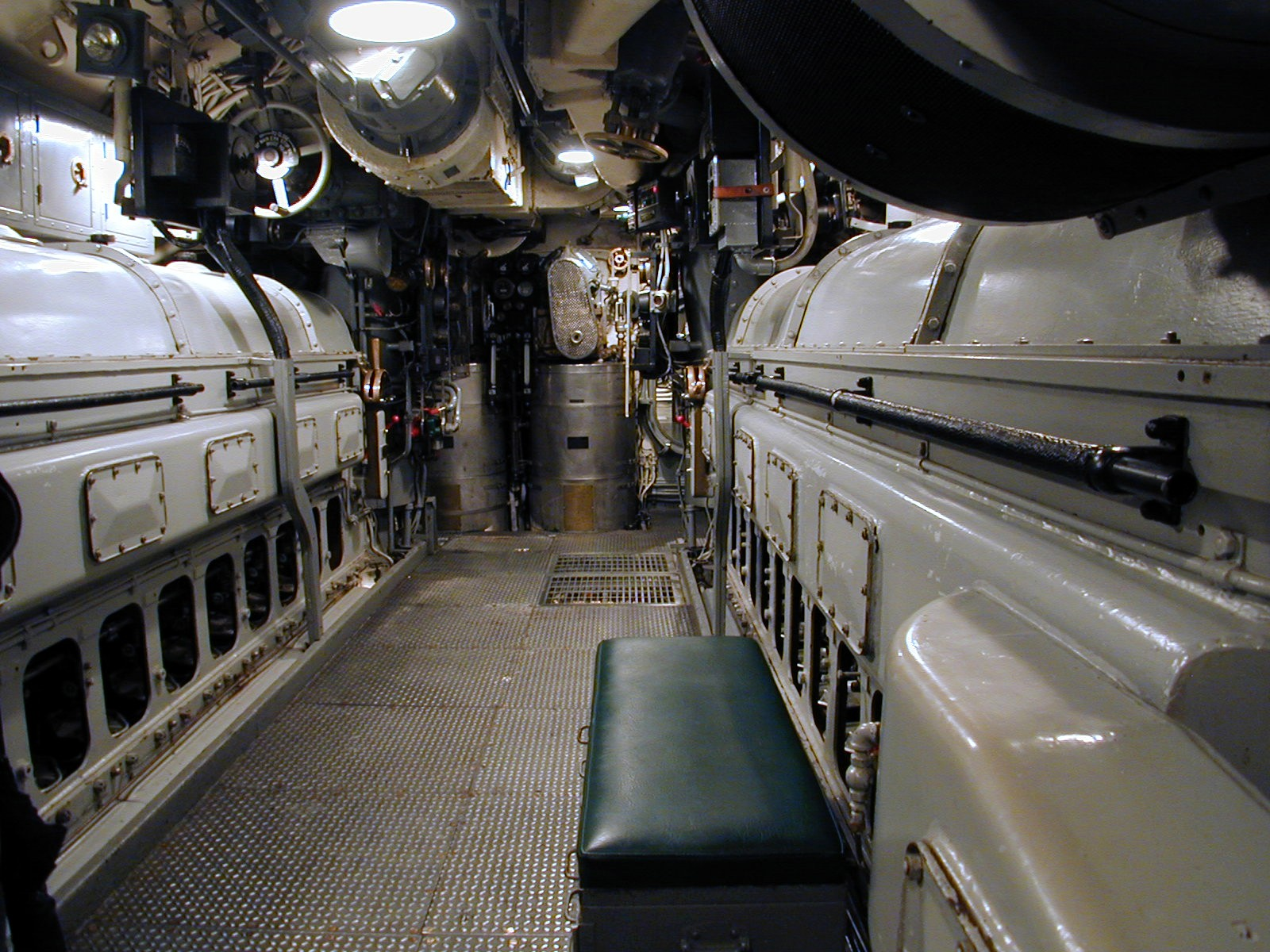
Fairbanks Morse 38 8-1/8 diesel engine on the USS Pampanito submarine

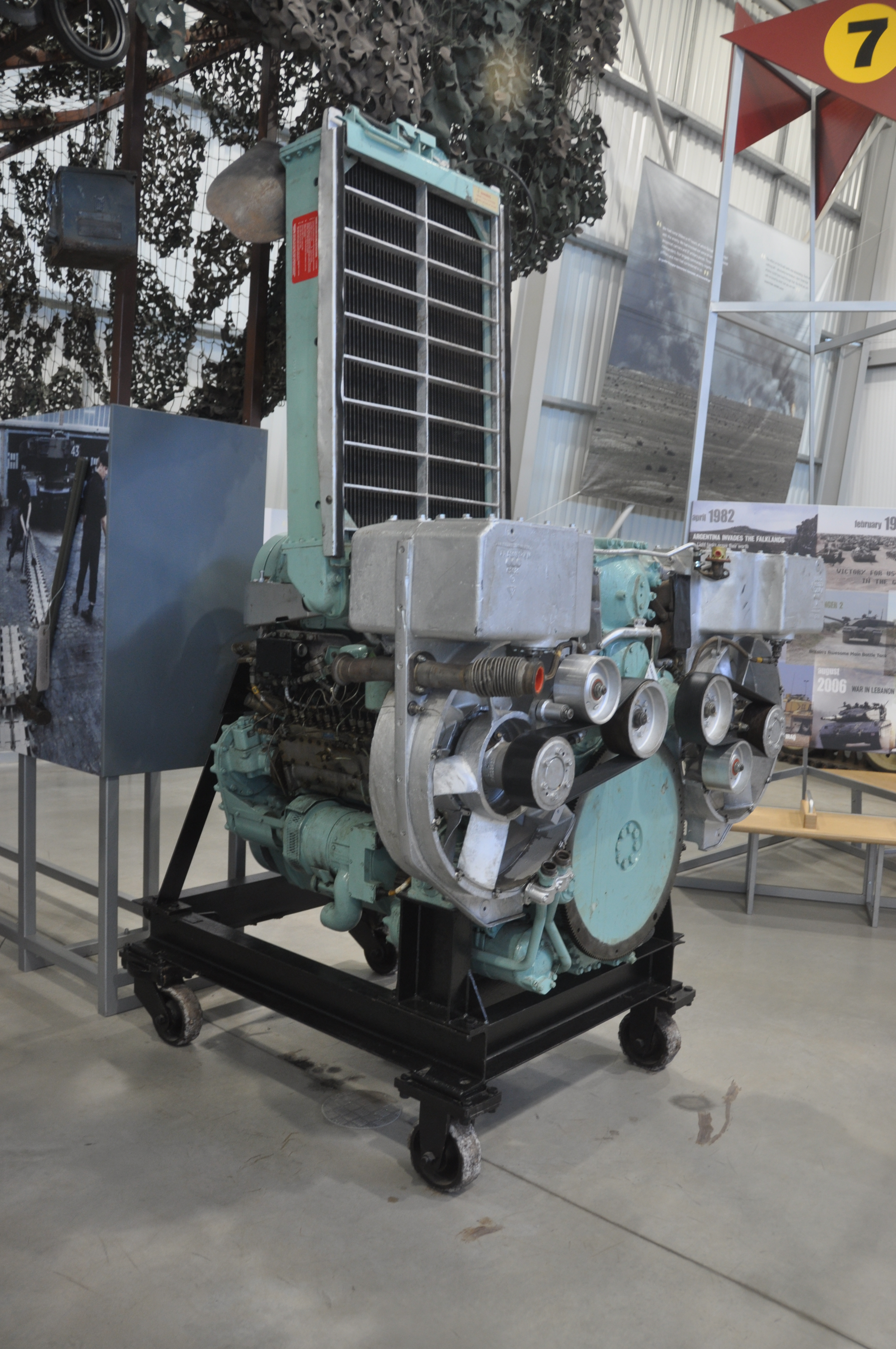
Leyland L60 as used in the Chieftain tank

=== 1940s to present ===
The Fairbanks Morse 38 8-1/8 diesel engine, designed in Germany in the 1930s, was used in U.S. submarines in the 1940s and 1950s, and in boats from the 1930s-present. It has been used in locomotives since 1944.

The November 2021 version of the Fairbanks-Morse 38 8-1/8, the FM 38D 8-1/8 Diesel and Dual Fuel, retains the same extra-heavy-duty design and has a rated in-service lifespan of more than 40 years, but now can burn dual fuels (gaseous and liquid fuels, with automatic switchover to full diesel if the gas supply runs out).

The Commer TS3 three-cylinder diesel truck engines, released in 1954, have a single crankshaft beneath the centre of the cylinders with both pistons connected by levers.

Animated diagram of the Napier Deltic

Also released in 1954 was the Napier Deltic engine for military boats. It uses three crankshafts, one at each corner, to form the three banks of double-ended cylinders arranged in an equilateral triangle. The Deltic engine was used in British Rail Class 55 and British Rail Class 23 locomotives and to power fast patrol boats and Royal Navy mine sweepers. Beginning in 1962, Gibbs invited Mack Trucks to take part in designing FDNY’s super pumper and its companion tender. DeLaval Turbine was commissioned to design a multistage centrifugal pump with a Napier-Deltic T18-37C diesel to power the pumps.

In 1959, the Leyland L60 19 L (1,159 cu in) six-cylinder diesel engine was introduced. The L60 was produced in the United Kingdom for use in the Chieftain tank.

The Soviet T-64 tank, produced from 1963–1987, also used an opposed-piston diesel engine, the 5TD engine, which was developed by the Malyshev Factory in Kharkiv. After the dissolution of the Soviet Union, Malyshev continued development and production of opposed-piston engines for armored vehicles, such as the three-cylinder 3TD used in BTR-4 Butsefal, various upgrades of the 5TD and the six-cylinder 6TD for T-64BM2, BM Oplot.

In 2014, Achates Power published a technical paper citing a 30% fuel economy improvement when its engine was benchmarked against a next-generation diesel engine equipped with advanced technologies.

Volvo filed for a patent in 2017.

The Diesel Air Dair 100 is a two-cylinder 100 hp (75 kW) diesel aircraft engine, designed and produced by Diesel Air Ltd of Olney, Buckinghamshire for use in airships, home-built kitplanes, and light aircraft.

In July 2021, Cummins was awarded an $87M contract by the United States Army to complete the development of the Advanced Combat Engine (ACE), a modular and scalable diesel engine solution that uses opposed-piston technology.

== Free-piston engine ==
A variation of the opposed-piston design is the free-piston engine, which was first patented in 1934. Free piston engines have no crankshaft, and the pistons are returned after each firing stroke by compression and expansion of air in a separate cylinder. Early applications were for use as an air compressor or as a gas generator for a gas turbine.

== See also ==
- Junk head
- Michel engine
- Split-single engine
