= 2S14 Zhalo-S =

Experimental Soviet self-propelled anti-tank gun

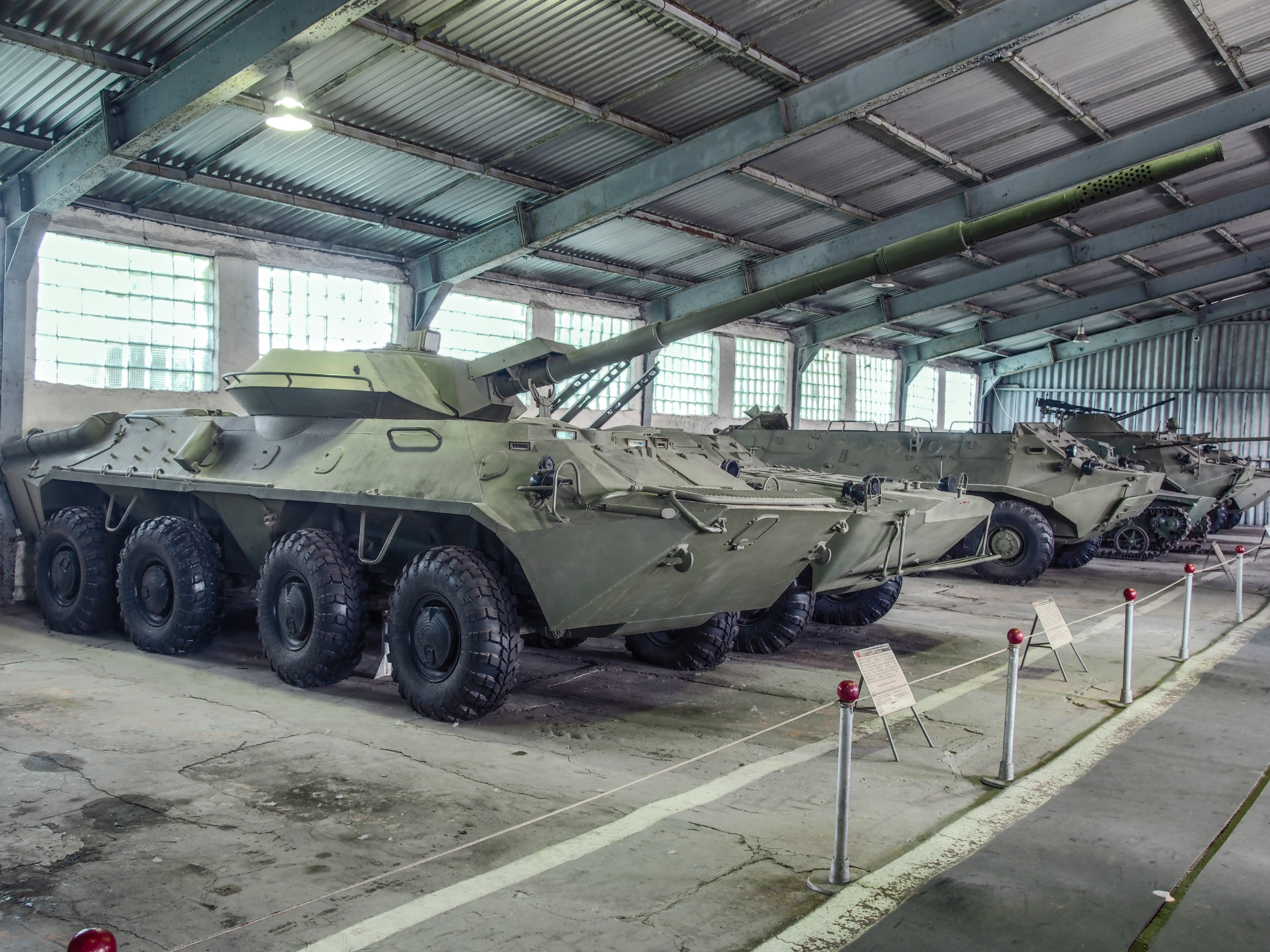
- The 2S14 in the Kubinka Tank Museum.
- Type: Self-propelled anti-tank gun
- Place of origin: Soviet Union

Production history
- Designer: Burevestnik Central Scientific Research Institute
- Designed: 1969–1980
- No. built: 1 (prototype)

Specifications
- Length: 9.95 m (32 ft 8 in) (gun forward); 7.51 m (24 ft 8 in) (chassis)
- Width: 2.79 m (9 ft 2 in)
- Height: 2.49 m (8 ft 2 in)
- Crew: 3-4
- Main armament: 85 mm 2A62 gun
- Engine: 2 x ZMZ-4905; 120 hp
- Power/weight: 19.2 hp/tonne (14.3 kW/tonne)
- Suspension: Individual torsion bar with hydraulic shock absorbers
- Operational range: 400-600 km
- Maximum speed: 80 km/h (50 mph) (road); 9–10 km/h (5.6–6.2 mph) (water)

The 2S14 Zhalo-S (Russian: 2С14 «Жало-С» English: "Sting-S") is a Soviet experimental 85 mm-caliber battalion-level self-propelled anti-tank gun. Designed by the Gorky-based Burevestnik Central Scientific Research Institute, the 2S14 is based on the BTR-70 armored personnel carrier.

== History ==
After the end of World War II, by 1948, the Soviet Ministry of Defense formed requirements for the tank and anti-tank guns for the Soviet army. The main requirements were: an increase in the initial velocity of the projectile and an increase in the firing range of anti-tank guns. Research on this topic made it possible to develop and adopt the 100 mm anti-tank gun T-12A (MT-12) by 1960 for the Soviet army. However, the further deployment of work on the design and development of ammunition was deemed inappropriate, since at the end of the 1950s, according to the Soviet leadership, the task of combating enemy tanks should have been shifted from classic barrel artillery to anti-tank guided missiles (ATGMs).

With tanks of enemy armed forces possessing increasing levels of protection against high-explosive anti-tank (HEAT) shaped charge shells, there was again a need to resume work on improving the armor-piercing abilities of sub-caliber armor-piercing shells, prompting a resumption of work on anti-tank guns. The 3rd Central Research Institute of the Ministry of Defense proposed to have anti-tank guns serving alongside anti-tank missile systems in 1964, when development of a new weapons system for the Rocket Forces of the USSR was underway. Work on a new generation of anti-tank guns began in 1969-1970, with the 2S15 Norov self-propelled anti-tank gun meant for corps-level use and the 125 mm Sprut anti-tank gun for regimental use. For battalions, 85 mm light anti-tank guns, in both towed and self-propelled versions would be used. This led to the creation of the 2S14 Zhalo-S.

Design work on the Zhalo-S was given to the Burevestnik Central Scientific Research Institute, who was at the same time working on a towed variant, the 2A55 Zhalo-B. It built a mock-up model of the gun under the designation KM-33, and developed and tested new ammunition for both the Zhalo-B and the Zhalo-S. The prototype vehicle of the Zhalo-S was completed in 1975 and passed factory tests before being sent for testing at the Rzhevsky Artillery Range and the proving grounds in Kubinka. By 1980, the Zhalo-S had completed the entire test cycle, the results of which were assessed as positive, but was not adopted due to how the 85 mm gun became ineffective against newer tanks. Furthermore, the rather small caliber of 85 mm meant that the gun was not suitable for using guided munitions, which were actively developed for other larger-caliber weapon systems.

By 1975, a prototype of Zhalo-S was manufactured, which successfully passed factory tests, and then was sent for field tests at Rzhevsky artillery range and NII BT Armored training ground in Kubinka. By 1980, the Zhalo-S passed the entire cycle of tests, the results of which were assessed as positive by an interdepartmental commission. However, both towed and self-propelled anti-tank guns of the Zhalo family were not adopted. Despite the 2S14 making it possible to successfully fight against self-propelled artillery mounts and light armored vehicles of the enemy, by the time the work was completed, the 85-mm gun of the Zhalo-S did not allow effectively fighting new tanks of the enemy. Also, the 85 mm caliber was then too small for use with guided munitions, the development of which was actively carried out for other systems of larger caliber.

== Design ==
The 2S14 Zhalo-S was built on the BTR-70 armored personnel carrier chassis, with a turret mounting an 85 mm 2A62 gun, which had identical ballistic characteristics and ammunition to the towed 2A55 anti-tank gun. The 2A62 was equipped with a muzzle brake with an efficiency up to 75-80%, able to fire 20-25 shells per minute. The 2A62 used armor-piercing fin-stabilized discarding sabot (APFSDS) shells, which were exclusive to the gun. The APFSDS shell had a penetration ability 1.5 times lower than that from a 125 mm D-81 gun. A periscopic sight was provided for aiming the gun, with an R-173 radio station provided for communications.

== Comparison with other similar vehicles ==
Comparison of Zhalo-S with local counterparts
	KSP-76	Zhalo-S	BTR-90M
Chassis based on	GAZ-63	BTR-70	BTR-90
Combat weight, t	5,4	12,5	no more than 20 (Note: Characteristics for the base chassis.)
Crew	3	3–4	3
Gun	ZiS-3	2А62	2A70
Gun mounted on	Superstructure	Turret	Turret
Gun caliber, mm	76,2	85	100
Armor penetration of armor-piercing subcaliber projectile at a distance of 2 km, mm	75 (Note: For the 53-Br-354N projectile.)	250 (Note: Considering the armor penetration of the 3BM22 projectile, adopted by the Soviet army in 1976, and the armor penetration of the 85-mm 2A62 cannon, which is approximately one and a half times lower than that of the D-81.)	– (Note: The 100mm 2A70 only utilizes High Explosive and ATGM projectiles.)
Has guided weapons system?	No	No	Yes
Ammunition, rounds	54	30–40	–
Rate of fire, rounds/min	15	20–25	–
Maximum speed on ground, km/h	62,5–77	80	100
Maximum speed while floating on water, km/h	–	9–10	12

Work on high-maneuverability wheeled anti-tank guns began in the USSR long before the invention of the Zhalo-S, such as the 76 mm KSP-76 built upon a GAZ-63 truck chassis, which was not adopted into service due to insufficient mobility. Compared to the KSP-76 the 2S14 Zhalo-S had a number of advantages, such as a turreted main gun, a higher-speed chassis, a better rate-of-fire and armor penetration. This made the Zhalo-S better suited to fight against light armored vehicles and self-propelled artillery. However, there were also disadvantages. The caliber of 85 mm meant that guided munitions were impossible to develop at that time, and the penetration ability was insufficient to penetrate tanks such as the American M1 Abrams and the British Challenger 2. Later, the USSR Ministry of Defense returned to wheeled self-propelled guns, starting work on what would eventually become the Sprut-K. The Sprut-K was supposed to have the same ballistic performance and ammunition as the 2A46 125 mm gun, mounted atop a BTR-90 chassis. However, the Sprut-K was also not adopted, making the place of lightweight high-mobility self-propelled anti-tank guns vacant in the Russian Armed Forces.

Comparison of 2S14 Zhalo-S with foreign counterparts
	USSR Zhalo-S	France AMX-10RC	Brazil EE-9
Development years	1969–1980	1970–1981	1970–1975
Crew number	3–4	4	3
Weight, t	12,5	15,88	13,4
Gun caliber	85	105	90
Ammunition, rounds	30–40	38	44
Maximum speed, km/h	80	85	100
Maximum speed in water, km/h	9–10	7,2	–
Range, km	400–600	1000	880
Wheel layout	8×8	6×6	6×6/2

In addition to the USSR, other states developed wheeled armored vehicles able to fight tanks. In 1981, the French army entered service with 105 mm AMX-10RC armored vehicles. The main armament was the F2 rifled cannon, which was incompatible with the ammunition load of the L7 type tank guns. The Brazilian army entered service in 1975 with EE-9 Cascavel armored vehicles equipped with a 90-mm anti-tank gun. Unlike the Zhalo-S, the fight against tanks was not the main purpose for both the AMX-10RC and the EE-9. The main task was to use them as reconnaissance vehicles, which affected the instrumental composition of these machines and the tactics of their use. Later in the 1980s, and then in the 1990s and 2000s, other states also showed interest in the creation of wheeled anti-tank vehicles, as a result of which a separate class of equipment appeared, sometimes referred to as wheeled tanks.

== Surviving vehicles ==
- Russia: As of 2022, the only surviving Zhalo-S is in the Kubinka Tank Museum.

== See also ==
- 2S25 Sprut-SD
