= 125 mm smoothbore ammunition =

Soviet and Russian tank ammunition

The following is a list of ammunition fired by the 125 mm smoothbore gun series used in the T-64, T-72, T-80, M-84, T-90, PT-91, T-14 Armata, and other tanks derived from those designs, as well as the 2A45 Sprut anti-tank gun.

== APFSDS-T ==
Armour-piercing fin-stabilized discarding sabot (APFSDS) using a sabot and tracer (APFSDS-T). Typically used against other modern tanks.

There are different ways to measure penetration value. NATO uses the 50% criteria against 260BHN Steel, while the Soviet/Russian standard is higher (80% had to go through).

=== 3VBM3/3BM9/10 ===
Entered service in 1962. The projectile is Maraging steel.

- Country of origin: Soviet Union
- Projectile dimension: 410 mm 10: 1 L/d
- Projectile weight (including sabot): 5.67 kg
- Projectile weight: 3.6 kg
- Muzzle velocity: 1800 m/s
- Muzzle energy: 5.8 MJ
- Penetration: 245 mm at 0° at 2000 m, 140 mm at 60° at 2000 m, (energy at 2000 m is 4.2 MJ)

Note: The GRAU index of a penetrator differs from that of the complete round. 3BM9 refers only to the penetrator, while 3VBM3 refers to the complete round including the penetrator, propellant, and casing.

=== 3VBM6/3BM12/13 ===
Entered service (estimated) in 1968. Essentially the same as the 3BM9 projectile with a tungsten carbide plug.

- Country of origin: Soviet Union
- Projectile dimension: 410 mm 10: 1 L/d
- Projectile weight (including sabot): 5.67 kg
- Projectile weight: 3.6 kg
- Muzzle velocity: 1800 m/s
- Muzzle energy: 5.8 MJ
- Penetration: ?

=== 3VBM7/3BM15/16 ===
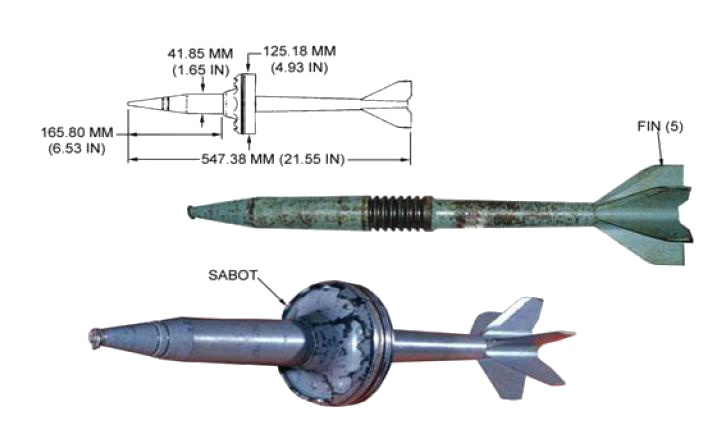
BM15 APFSDS projectile

Entered service (estimated 1972). A slightly longer 3BM12 projectile.

- Country of origin: Soviet Union
- Projectile dimension: 435 mm 12: 1 L/d
- Projectile weight (including sabot): 5.9 kg
- Projectile weight: 3.9 kg including 2.9 kg and 0.27 kg tungsten carbide plug
- Muzzle velocity: 1785 m/s
- Muzzle energy: 6.2 MJ
- Penetration: 400 mm at 0° at 2000 m, 150 mm at 60° at 2000 m

=== 3VBM8/3BM17/18 ===
Entered service (estimated 1972). An export version of the 3BM-15 without the tungsten carbide plug. Hence, it is an all-steel penetrator with inferior performance.

- Country of origin: Soviet Union
- Projectile dimension: 450 mm 12: 1 L/d
- Projectile weight (including sabot): 5.9 kg
- Projectile weight: 3.9 kg
- Muzzle velocity: 1780 m/s
- Muzzle energy: 6.2 MJ
- Penetration: 150 mm at 60° at 2000 m

=== 3VBM9/3BM22/23 (3BM22 "Zakolka") ===
Entered service 1976. Tungsten carbide penetrator core sheathed in steel. Enlarged cap to help reduce deflection at steep angles and to hold a larger penetrator.

- Country of origin: Soviet Union
- Projectile dimension: 400 mm 11: 1 L/d
- Projectile weight (including sabot): 6.55 kg
- Projectile weight: 4.485 kg
- Muzzle velocity: 1785 m/s
- Muzzle energy: 7.0 MJ
- Penetration: 420 mm at 0° at 2000 m, 170 mm at 60° at 2000 m

=== 3VBM10/3BM29/30 (3BM29 "Nadphil-2) ===
Entered service 1982. Depleted uranium-nickel-iron alloy sheathed in steel.

- Country of origin: Soviet Union
- Projectile dimension: 450 mm 12: 1 L/d - including 250 mm core
- Projectile weight (including sabot): 6.55 kg
- Projectile weight: 4.85 kg
- Muzzle velocity: 1700 m/s
- Muzzle energy: 7.0 MJ
- Penetration: 360 mm at 0° at 2000 m, 210 mm at 60° at 2000 m

=== 3VBM11/3BM26/27 (3BM26 "Nadezhda-R) ===
Entered service 1983. Tungsten-nickel-iron alloy penetrator core sheathed in steel. Utilised new 4Zh63 high-energy propelling charge. Penetrator is base-installed to prevent deflection during penetration against multi-layered composite armour. Improved penetrator cap made of aluminium alloy.

- Country of origin: Soviet Union
- Projectile dimension: 395 mm 11: 1 L/d
- Projectile weight (including sabot): 7.05 kg
- Projectile weight: 4.8 kg
- Muzzle velocity: 1720 m/s
- Muzzle energy: 7.5 MJ
- Penetration: 410 mm at 0° at 2000 m, 200 mm at 60° at 2000 m

=== 3VBM13/3BM32/33 (3BM32 "Vant") ===
Entered service in 1985. The projectile is an integrated depleted uranium-nickel-zinc alloy penetrator.

- Country of origin: Soviet Union
- Projectile dimension: 380 mm 13: 1 L/d
- Projectile weight (including sabot): 7.05 kg
- Projectile weight: 4.85 kg
- Muzzle velocity: 1700 m/s
- Muzzle energy: 7.0 MJ
- Penetration 395 mm at 0° at 2000 m, 230 mm at 60° at 2000 m

=== 3VBM17/3BM42 (3BM42 "Mango") ===
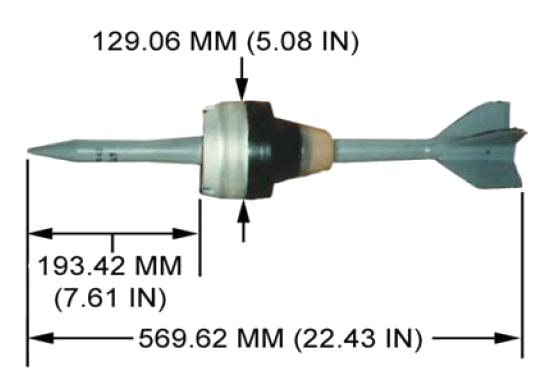
A BM-42 APFSDS projectile

Entered service in 1986. The projectile is double tungsten alloy rod sheathed in low melting point alloy covered with steel, intended to increase penetration against non-explosive reactive armour (NERA) such as Chobham armour. Is slowly being replaced by newer models such as 3BM59/60.

- Country of origin: Soviet Union
- Penetrator dimension: 532 mm 17: 1 L/d
- Round weight: 20.4 kg
- Projectile weight: 4.85 kg
- Projectile weight (including sabot): 7.05 kg
- Muzzle velocity: 1700 m/s
- Muzzle energy: 7.1 MJ
- Penetration: 230mm @ 2000m at 60° and 520mm @ 2000m at 0° against standard 260BHN Steel Target

=== 3VBM19/3BM42M (3BM44M "Lekalo") ===
From 1994, remained experimental and eventually evolved into the 3BM-59/60 meaning the outside design remained the same, the length of cartridge remained pretty much unchanged but the penetrator was further improved from the initial jacketed design which was improvement over the standard 3BM-42

- Country of origin: Russia
- Penetrator dimension: 570 mm 25: 1 L/d
- Round weight: ? kg
- Projectile weight (including sabot): 6.95 kg
- Projectile weight: 4.6 kg
- Muzzle velocity: 1750 m/s?
- Muzzle energy: 7.04 MJ
- Penetration: 270mm @ 2000m at 60° against standard 260BHN Steel Target

=== 3BM42-2 (3BM44-2 "Mango-2") ===
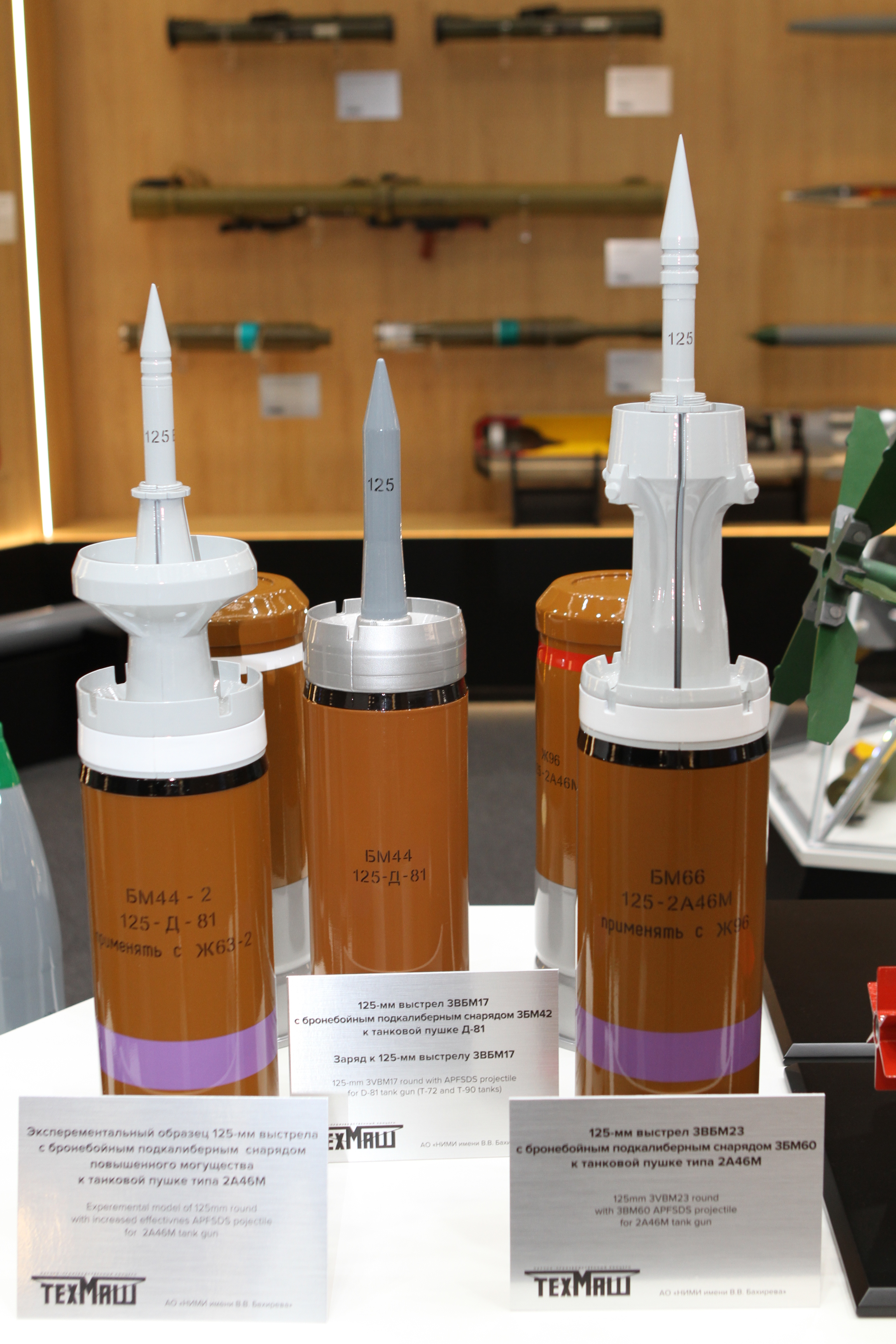
APFSDS Projectiles

Currently in Experimental Phase, most famously seen at the Expo 2019 alongside 3BM-42 and 3BM-60. Uses the initial jacketed 3BM-42M penetrator but the cartridge is shorter over the Lekalo, designed to fit in the standard autoloader and is most likely to replace the standard 3BM-42 as main service round soon

- Country of origin: Russia
- Cartridge dimension: 685mm
- Penetrator dimension: 570 mm 26: 1 L/d
- Round weight: ? kg
- Projectile weight (including sabot): ?
- Penetrator weight: ?
- Muzzle velocity: 1700 m/s
- Muzzle energy: ?
- Penetration: 520mm 0° at 2000m 280 mm at 2000m at 60° against standard 260BHN Steel Target

=== 3VBM20/3BM46 (3BM48 "Svinets") ===
Entered service in 1991. Uses a new advanced high elongation uranium Monoblock penetrator.

- Country of origin: Soviet Union
- Penetrator dimension: 546 mm 21.84: 1 L/d
- Round weight: ?; kg
- Projectile weight (including sabot): ?
- Projectile weight: 4.85 kg
- Muzzle velocity: 1700 m/s
- Muzzle energy: 7.4 MJ
- Penetration: ~300mm @ 2000m at 60°, ~660mm @ 2000m at 0°

=== 3VBM23/3BM60 (3BM60 "Svinets-2") ===
Entered service : 2016.

The new round uses a new sabot design, and a Tungsten Alloy penetrator of increased length compared to prior generation Russian APFSDS ammunition. Used on 2A46M-4/5 with new autoloader.

- Cartridge dimension: 735 mm
- Penetrator dimension: 640 mm 28-29: 1 L/D
- Round weight: ? kg
- Projectile weight (including sabot): 8.4 kg
- Penetrator weight:
- Muzzle velocity: 1660 m/s
- Muzzle energy: 12.1 MJ?
- Penetration: 300mm at 2000m at 60° against standard 260BHN Steel Target

=== 3VBM22/3BM59 (3BM59 "Svinets-1") ===
Entered service: 2016.

Uses a new sabot design, and a new depleted uranium penetrator. Used on 2A46M-5 with new autoloader.

- Country of origin: Russia
- Cartridge dimension: 735mm
- Penetrator dimension: 640 mm 28-29: 1 L/D
- Round weight: 22.0 kg
- Projectile weight (including sabot): 8.5 kg
- Penetrator weight:
- Muzzle velocity: 1650 m/s
- Muzzle energy: 12.1 MJ
- Penetration: ~315-330mm at 60° at 2000m

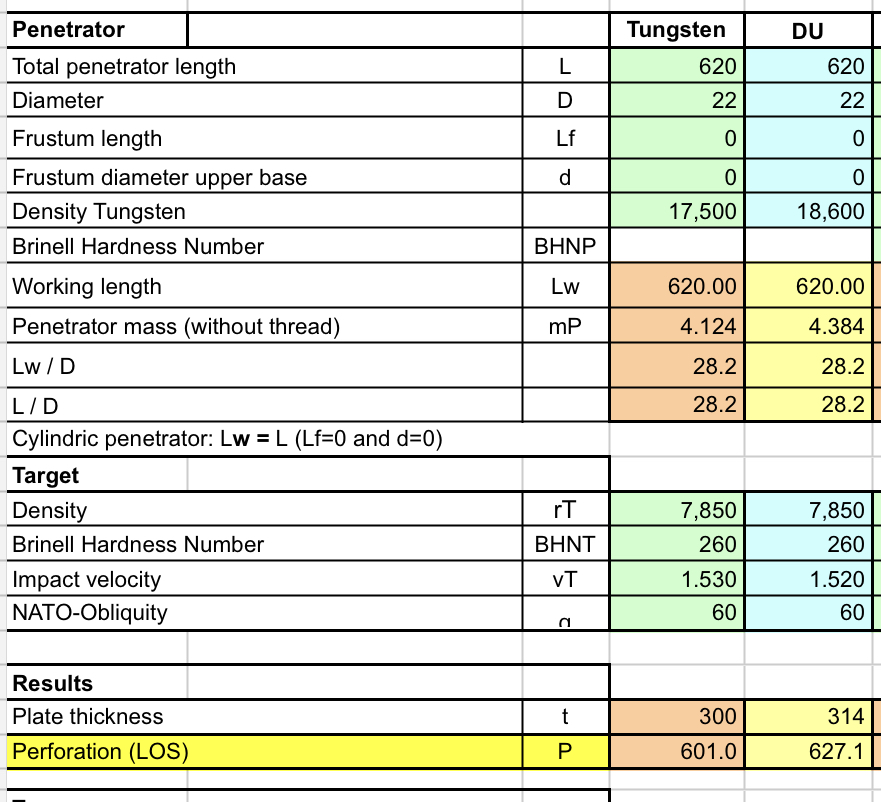
APFSDS Projectiles

=== 3VBM?/3BM69 "Vacuum-1" ===
Uses a new sabot. Reported to be uranium alloy. For use on 2A82-1M cannon on T-14 Armata.

- Country of origin: Russia
- Projectile dimension: ?
- Round weight: ?
- Projectile weight (including sabot): ?
- Projectile weight: estimated 11 kg
- Muzzle velocity: 2050 m/s
- Muzzle energy: 15–24 MJ (described 15MJ probably refer to high-explosive shell)
- Penetration: estimated 850 to 1,000 mm at 0° at 2000m

=== 3VBM?/3BM70 "Vacuum-2" ===
Uses a new sabot. Identical to 3BM69 in dimensions, the difference being that the projectile is made out of tungsten.

- Country of origin: Russia
- Projectile dimension: ?
- Round weight: ?
- Projectile weight (including sabot): ?
- Muzzle velocity: ?
- Muzzle energy: ?
- Penetration: ~900mm at 0° 2000m steel target

=== 125-I ===
First-generation Chinese sabot round in service since 1993, also license produced by Pakistan.

- Country of origin: China
- Projectile dimension: 554 mm
- Round weight: 21.3 kg
- Projectile weight (including sabot): 7.37 kg
- Muzzle velocity: 1730 m/s
- Muzzle energy: ?
- Penetration: 220mm @ 2000m at 61.5° against 4340 Steel

=== DTW-125 ===
Second-generation Chinese sabot round introduced in 1999. Initially 125-IIM acted as the export version with reduced velocity but with the introduction of DTC10-125, the DTW-125 itself became exported under the name “BTA4”

- Country of origin: China
- Projectile dimension: 642 mm
- Round weight: 21.36 kg
- Projectile weight (without Sabot): 4.1 kg
- Muzzle velocity: 1740 m/s
- Muzzle energy: ?
- Penetration: 230mm @ 200 at 68.5° against 4340 Steel

=== DTC10-125 ===
Third-generation Chinese sabot round which was introduced in 2010 and the subject of a data leak on the War Thunder forum in June 2022 (leaked data is used here). This performance value is identical to value shown on Chinese state media, CCTV7.

- Country of origin: China
- Projectile dimension: 670 mm
- Round weight: ?
- Projectile weight (including sabot): ?
- Muzzle velocity: 1760 m/s
- Muzzle energy: ?
- Penetration: 220mm @ 2000m at 71.12° against 4340 Steel

=== TAPNA ===
Produced by MSM Group in Slovakia. The penetrator is made from tungsten alloy.

- Country of origin: Slovakia
- Projectile dimension: 610mm
- Round weight: 20 kg
- Projectile weight (including sabot): 7.15 kg
- Muzzle velocity: 1690 m/s
- Muzzle energy: ?
- Penetration: 270 mm @ 2000 m at 60° against standard 260BHN Steel Target

== HEAT-FS ==
High-explosive anti-tank (HEAT) fin stabilized (HEAT-FS) rounds. Typically used against lighter or older tanks and armoured personnel carriers.

=== 3VBK7/3BK12 ===
Entered service 1962.

- Country of origin: Soviet Union
- Projectile dimension: 680 mm
- Projectile weight: 19 kg
- Max dispersion: 0.21 mil (0.21 mrad)
- Muzzle velocity: 905 m/s
- Charge: shaped charge, steel liner, A-IX-1 (RDX phlegmatized with 5% wax), I-238 detonator
- Penetration: 420 mm RHA at 0 degrees

==== 3BK12M ====
Entered service 1968, replacing steel liner with a copper liner. "M" means медь ("copper" in Russian) Uses 3V-15 detonator. Due to Soviet Union's copper economize policy production of the model is limited. Penetration performance claimed to be 10% higher than steel liner version.

- Country of origin: Soviet Union

=== 3VBK10/3BK14 ===
Entered service 1968.

- Country of origin: Soviet Union
- Projectile dimension: 680 mm
- Projectile weight: 19 kg
- Max dispersion: 0.21 mil (0.21 mrad)
- Muzzle velocity: 905 m/s
- Charge: shaped charge, steel liner, Okfol (phlegmatized HMX with 5% plasticizer); 3V-15 detonator
- Charge weight: 1.62 kg
- Penetration: 450 mm RHA at 0 degrees

==== 3BK14M ====
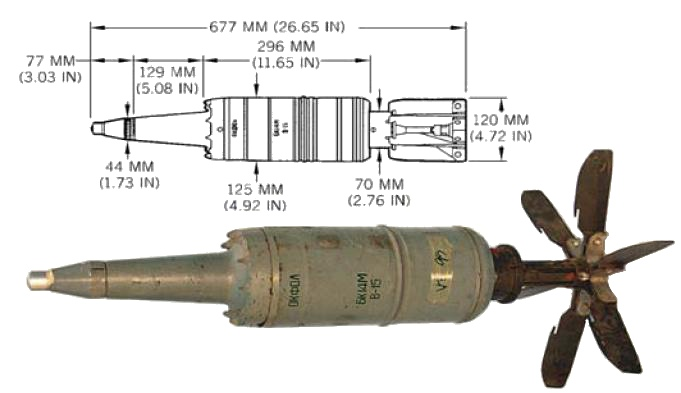
3BK14M HEAT round

Improved version, replacing steel liner with a copper liner.

=== 3VBK16/3BK18 ===
Entered service estimated 1975. Introduced wave-shaping booster.

- Country of origin: Soviet Union
- Round weight: 29.0 kg
- Projectile dimension: 680 mm
- Projectile weight: 19 kg
- Max dispersion: 0.21 mil (0.21 mrad)
- Muzzle velocity: 905 m/s
- Charge: shaped charge, steel liner, Okfol (phlegmatized HMX with 5% plasticizer); 3V-15 detonator
- Penetration: 500 mm RHA at 0 degrees

==== 3BK18M ====
Improved warhead. Entered service estimated 1978, replacing steel liner with a copper liner. Improved wave-shaping booster.

- Country of origin: Soviet Union
- Projectile weight: 19.02 kg
- Muzzle velocity: 905 m/s
- Penetration: 550 mm RHA at 0 degrees

=== 3VBK17/3BK21 ===
Entered service estimated 1980. Enhancements to improve reliability of the copper jet formation.

- Country of origin: Soviet Union
- Projectile dimension: 680 mm
- Projectile weight: 19 kg
- Max dispersion: 0.21 mil (0.21 mrad)
- Muzzle velocity: 905 m/s
- Charge: shaped charge, copper liner, Okfol (phlegmatized HMX with 5% plasticizer); 3V-15 detonator
- Penetration: 550 mm RHA at 0 degrees

==== 3BK21B ====
Entered service estimated 1982. "Material B" depleted uranium alloy liner to enhance penetration of advanced composite armours like Chobham.

- Country of origin: Soviet Union
- Projectile dimension: 680 mm
- Projectile weight: 19 kg
- Muzzle velocity: 905 m/s
- Penetration: 750 mm RHA at 0 degrees

=== 3VBK21/3BK25 ===
Entered service estimated 1985.

- Country of origin: Soviet Union
- Muzzle velocity: 905 m/s

=== 3VBK25/3BK29 "Breyk" ===
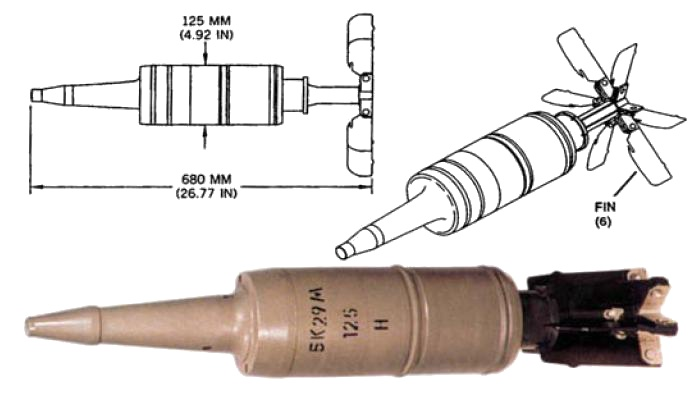
A 3BK29M HEAT round

Entered service estimated 1988. A new type of explosive-filling was applied, which improved focusing of the jet stream.

- Country of origin: Soviet Union
- Round weight: 28.4 kg
- Projectile dimension: 680 mm
- Projectile weight: 18.4 kg
- Muzzle velocity: 915 m/s
- Penetration: 350mm to 400mm RHA at 60 degree tandem-charge

==== 3VBK25M/3BK29M ====
- Country of origin: Soviet Union
- Projectile weight: 18.4 kg
- Charge weight: 1.62 kg
- Muzzle velocity: 915 m/s
- Penetration: Estimated at 800 mm tandem-charge HEAT

=== 3VBK27/3BK31 "Start" ===
First seen publicly in 1998. Reportedly a triple charge warhead intended to reduce efficiency of NERA elements.

- Country of origin: Russia
- Projectile weight: 18.4 kg
- Charge weight: 1.62 kg
- Muzzle velocity: 915 m/s
- Penetration: Estimated at 800 mm (triple charge HEAT)

== HE-frag-FS ==
High explosive fragmentation fin stabilised. General purpose rounds, for use against infantry, bunkers and light vehicles and other "soft" targets.

=== 3VOF22/3OF19 ===
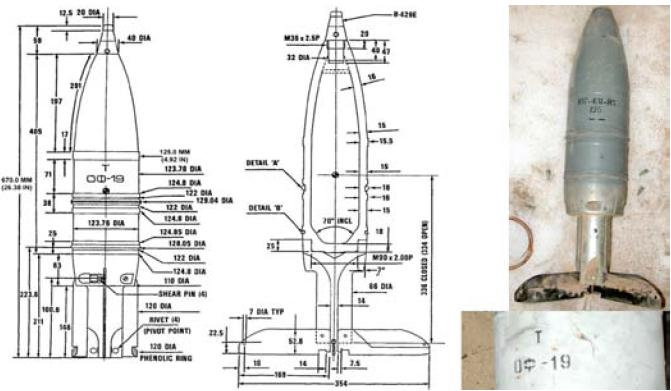
An OF-19 HE-FRAG projectile

Entered service in 1962. Uses the 3V-21 detonator (mass = 0.431 kg, reliability = 0.98). The 90% lethal zone for infantry is reported to be 40 m wide and 20 m deep.

- Country of origin: Soviet Union
- Round weight: 33.0 kg
- Projectile weight: 23.0 kg
- Muzzle velocity: 850 m/s
- Max dispersion: 0.23 mil (0.23 mrad)
- Charge weight: 3.148 kg
- Charge: TNT

=== 3VOF36/3OF26 ===
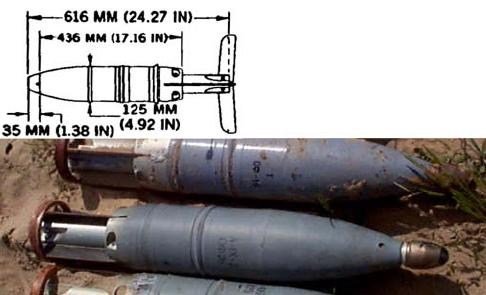
A 3OF26 HE-frag round

Entered service in 1970. Uses the 3V-21 detonator (mass = 0.431 kg, reliability = 0.98). The projectile creates between 600 and 2,000 fragments. The body is made up of 45Kh1 steel or 60S2 high-fragmentation steel for modern projectiles. Modern projectiles creates up to 2,500 effective fragments.

- Country of origin: Soviet Union
- Round weight: 33.0 kg
- Projectile weight: 23.0 kg
- Muzzle velocity: 850 m/s
- Max dispersion: 0.23 mil (0.23 mrad)
- Charge weight: 3.4 kg
- Charge: A-IX-2 (73% RDX, 23% aluminium powder, phlegmatized with 4% wax) 3.4 kg

=== 3VOF128/3OF82 ===
Entered service in 2014. Uses the 3VM-18 programmable detonator. The projectile contains 450 tungsten rods, each weighing 3 grams and creates 2,500 fragments in a cone formation ahead of the projectile when air burst mode is set. Air burst mode for use against infantry, light vehicles and helicopters, delayed mode use against bunkers and other constructions. Is currently used on the 2A46M-5 gun, mounted on the T-90M.

- Country of origin: Russia
- Round weight: 33.0 kg
- Projectile weight: 23.0 kg
- Muzzle velocity: 850 m/s
- Max dispersion: 0.23 mil (0.23 mrad)
- Charge weight: 3.0 kg
- Charge: A-IX-2 (73% RDX, 23% aluminium powder, phlegmatized with 4% wax) 3.0 kg

== Shrapnel-FS ==
=== 3VSh7/3Sh7 "Voron" ===
Entered service in 1975. Uses the 3VM-17 time detonator. For use against wide area infantry and light vehicles. Time of detonation setting is mechanical, for modernization, the shell fuze could be set automatically by improved "Ainet" systems or "Kalina" systems, which are available on the T-90K commander tank or the regular main battle tanks such as the T-90A, T-90M, T-80UA, and the T-14 Armata main battle tank.

- Country of origin: Soviet Union
- Round weight: 31.3 kg
- Projectile weight: 21.3 kg
- Muzzle velocity: 900 m/s
- Projectiles contain: 4,700 flechette weighing 1.26 g each
- Charge weight: 0.08 kg (A-IX-1)

=== 3VSh8/3Sh8 "Ainet" ===
Entered service in 1988. Uses the 3VM-12 programmable detonator. A part of Remote detonation system "Ainet" on T-80UK commander tank.

- Country of origin: Soviet Union
- Round weight: 31.3 kg
- Projectile weight: 21.3 kg
- Muzzle velocity: 900 m/s
- Projectiles contain: 4,700 flechettes weighing 1.26 g each
- Charge weight: 0.08 kg (A-IX-1)

== ATGW/ATGM ==
=== 9M112 Kobra ===
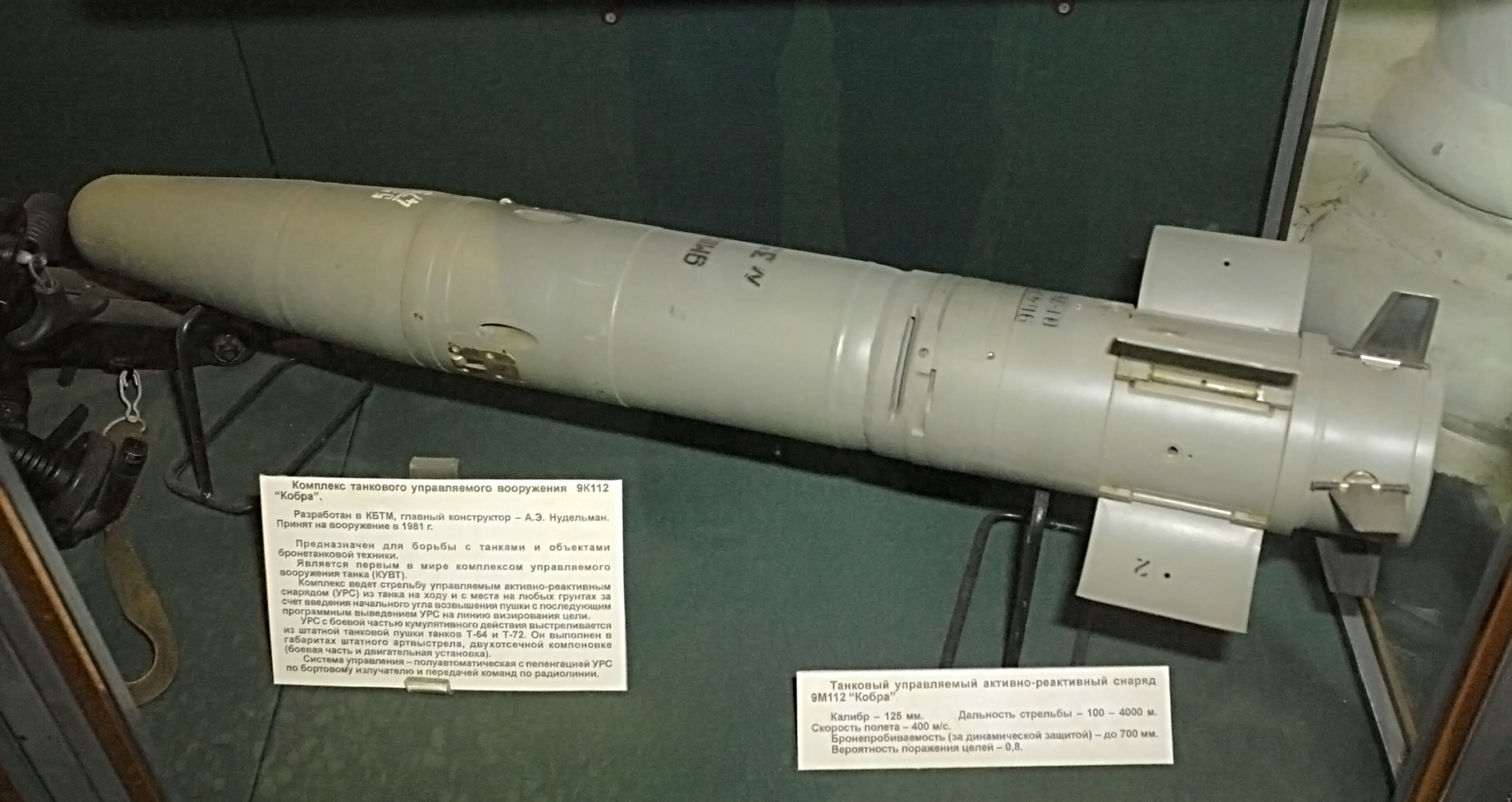
A 9K112 Kobra round in flight configuration

The 9K112 Kobra (NATO reporting name is AT-8 Songster) is also fired from the 125 mm main guns of the T-64 and T-80 series of tanks

- Country of origin: Soviet Union
- Projectile weight: 23.2 kg
- Warhead weight: 4.5 kg
- Guidance system: Radio-command guided
- Range: 100 – 4000 m
- Penetration: Estimated at 700 millimetres (28 in) after ERA tandem-charge HEAT

=== 9M119 Refleks ===
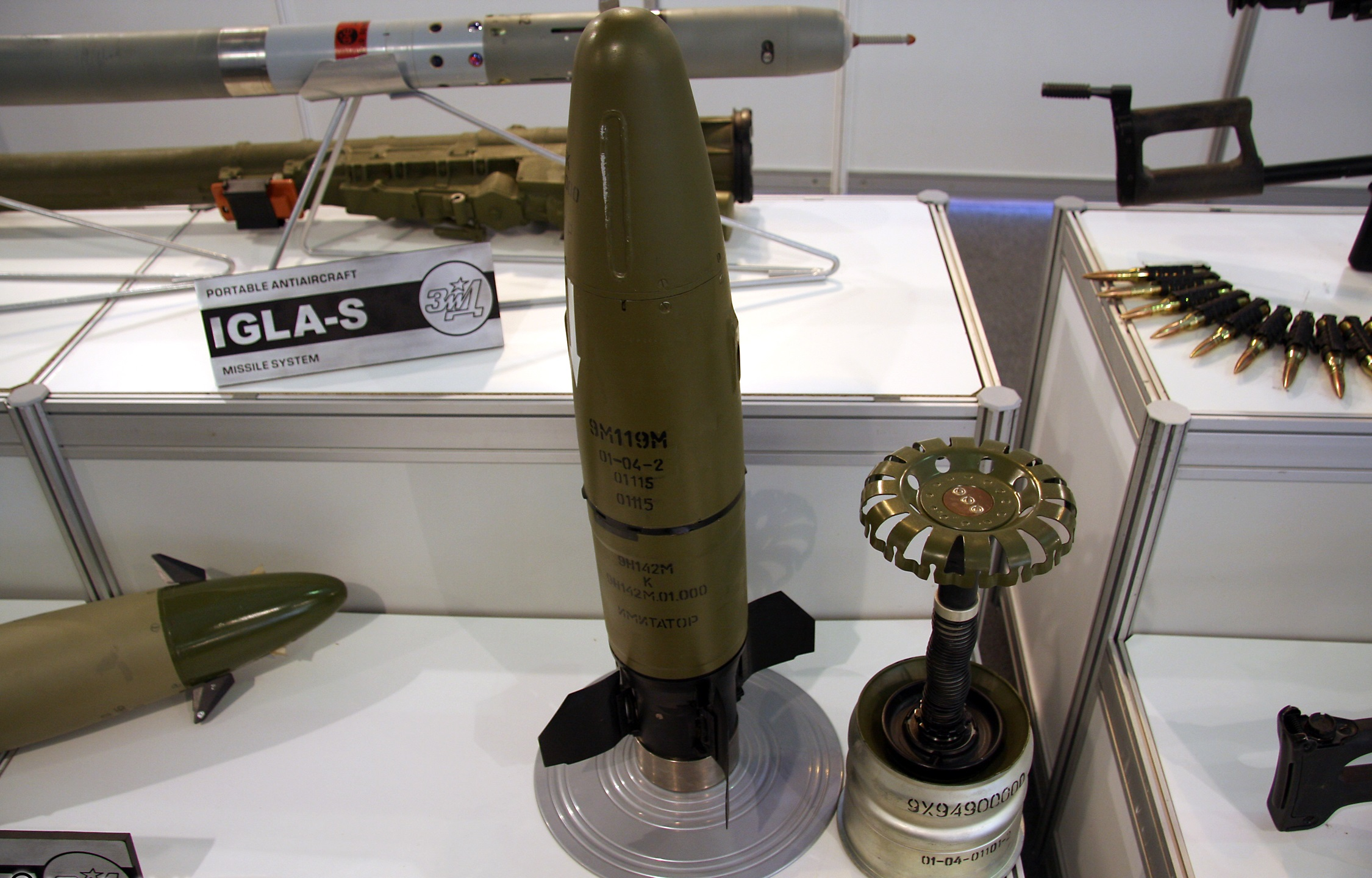
9M119M guided anti-tank guided missile

The 9M119 Svir and 9M119M Refleks (NATO reporting name: AT-11 Sniper) anti-tank guided missile has semi-automatic command to line of sight (SACLOS) laser beam riding guidance and a tandem shaped charge HEAT warhead. It has an effective range of 75 m to 5000 m, and takes 17.6 seconds to reach maximum range. Refleks can penetrate about 900 millimetres (35 in) of steel armour and can engage low-flying air targets such as helicopters.

- Country of origin: Soviet Union
- Projectile weight: 16.5 kg
- Warhead weight: 4.5 kg
- Guidance system: Laser beam riding
- Range: 75 – 5000 m
- Penetration: Estimated at 900 millimetres (35 in) after ERA tandem charge HEAT

=== 3UBK21 Sprinter ===
Designed for the 2A82-1M gun on T-14 Armata tanks, the 3UBK21 Sprinter has millimeter wave semi-automatic command to line of sight (SACLOS) guidance and a tandem shaped-charge HEAT warhead. It has an effective range of 50 m to 12000 m. and can penetrate 950 millimetres (37 in) of steel rolled homogeneous armour (RHAe) after explosive reactive armour (ERA). It can also engage low-flying air targets such as helicopters.

- Country of origin: Russia
- Projectile weight: ?
- Warhead weight: ?
- Guidance system: millimeter wave
- Range: 50 – 12000 m
- Penetration: Estimated at 950 millimetres (37 in) after ERA tandem charge HEAT

== Guided shell ==
=== Sokol-1 ===
The Sokol-1 guided shell is fired from the 125 mm main gun, it borrowed design from the 152mm artillery shell 3OF75 Santimetr-M and both have very similar appearance, but with an added shaped charge cap into its design similar to the M712 Copperhead, intended to defeat heavily armoured targets. It uses the technique that is referred to as the Russian concept of impulse corrections (RCIC), an impulse steering flight control system to correct the projectile's trajectory.

- Country of origin: Russia
- Projectile weight: 23.0 kg
- Muzzle velocity: 850 m/s
- Guidance system: Semi-Active Laser/Passive target contour-based
- Range: 0.1 – 5.0 km (direct fire)
  12 km (indirect fire)
- Warhead: High-explosive/700 millimetres (28 in) penetration shaped charge

=== 3UBK14F1/9M119F1 ===
The 3UBK14F1 guided shell is fired from the 125 mm main gun, its design was modified from 9M119 missile, removing the rocket motor and replacing it with an extra thermobaric warhead, turning it into a guided shell. Its range was decreased to 3.5 km, and it is claimed to have three times the explosive power of regular thermobaric variant 125 mm guided missiles.

- Country of origin: Russia
- Projectile weight: 16.5 kg
- Muzzle velocity: 284 m/s
- Guidance system: Laser beam riding
- Range: 0.1 – 3.5 km
- Warhead: Thermobaric estimated 15 kg TNT equivalent

== See also ==
- 2A46 D-81T
- 2A45 Sprut
- 120×570mm NATO
