= AT-11 =

AT-11 may refer to:

- AT-11 Sniper, a guided antitank missile
- AT-11 Kansan, a World War II training aircraft
