= Export variants of Soviet military equipment =

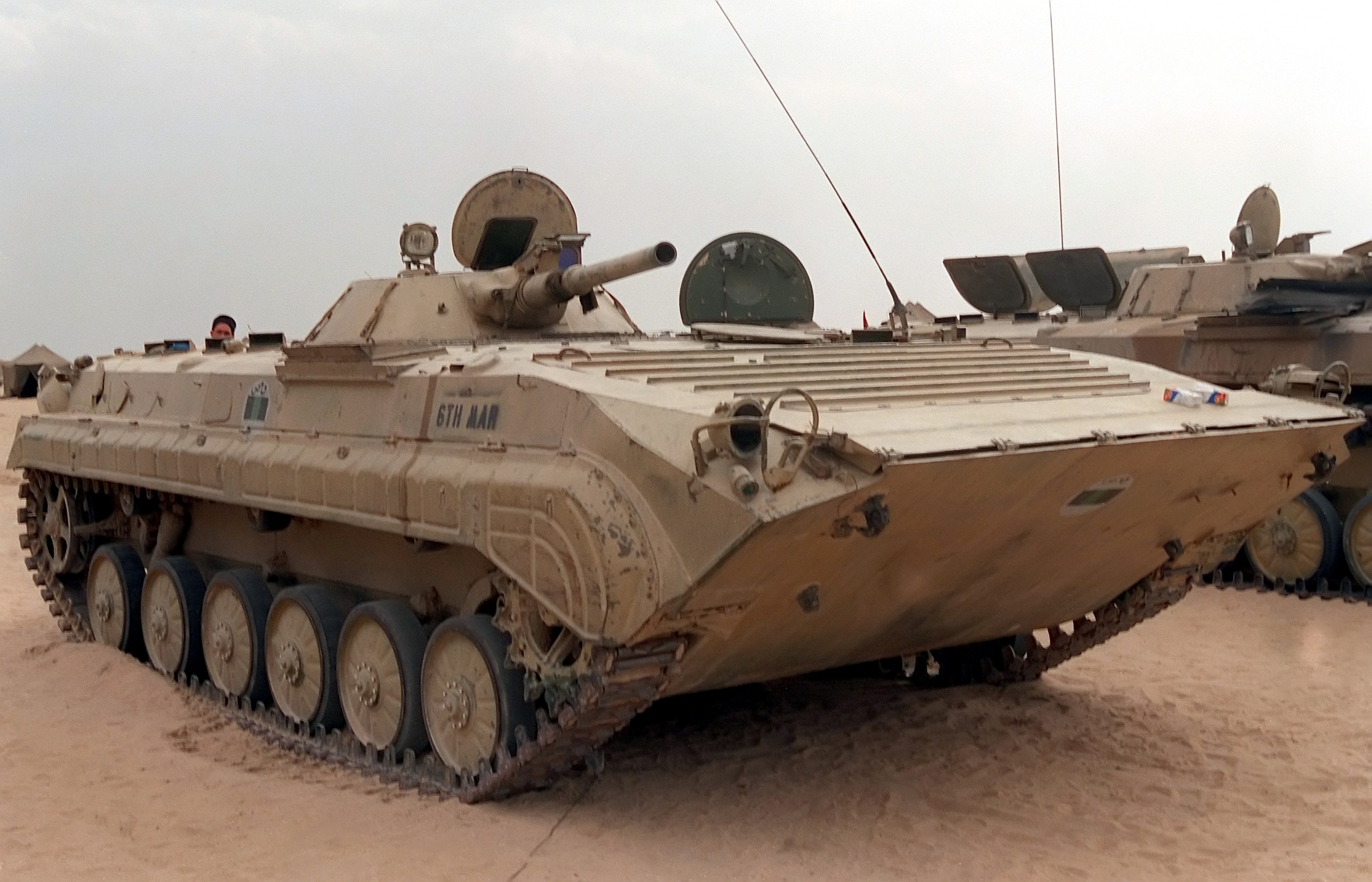
Ex-Iraqi BMP-1 IFV captured by the US forces in Iraq during the Gulf War

Export variants of Soviet military equipment were versions of Soviet military equipment (armored vehicles, airplanes, missiles) of significantly inferior capability to the original designs and intended only for export. Monkey model was the unofficial designation given by the Soviet Armed Forces to such variants. The monkey model was exported with the same or a similar designation as the original Soviet design but in fact it lacked many of the advanced or expensive features of the original.

Monkey-model weaponry was used mainly by non-communist Soviet allies, such as Egypt, Iraq and Syria. Eastern Bloc states such as the Warsaw Pact countries and other Communist allies such as Cuba and Vietnam generally used fully capable versions of Soviet weaponry, although poorer states often used earlier generations of weapons.

The term monkey model was popularized in the West by Viktor Suvorov, in Inside the Soviet Army. Suvorov stated that the simplified monkey model was designed for massive production in wartime, to replace front-line stocks if a war should last for several weeks. In peacetime, Soviet industry gained experience building both standard and export-model variants, the latter being for sale "to the 'brothers' and 'friends' of the USSR as the very latest equipment available." He also cited the benefit of disinformation when an exported monkey model fell into the hands of Western intelligence, who "naturally gained a completely false impression of the true combat capabilities of the BMP-1 and of Soviet tanks".

== Armored vehicles ==
Monkey-model tanks were equipped with downgraded fire control systems, downgraded armor, no NBC system, and provided with substandard ammunition. Their ballistic computers, rangefinders, and night vision were inferior to those found on tanks for Soviet use.

For instance, the 3BM17 APFSDS 125 mm smoothbore ammunition was designed specifically for export, and had a penetration of sloped armor at 2,000 m that was inferior to the Soviet model, the 3BM15. By the time of the Gulf War, both rounds were obsolescent and relegated solely to training purposes. For third world client states, however, they were the most advanced 125mm KE rounds available.

== Aircraft ==
Monkey-model aircraft were similarly downgraded. The MiG-23MS "Flogger-E", for example, was an export variant of the MiG-23, developed because the MiG-23 was considered too advanced to be exported to third world countries. The MiG-23MS lacked the most advanced features of the original. Infra-red search and track and beyond visual range missile capabilities were removed, and its avionics suite was very basic. This variant was widely sold during the 1970s to Soviet allies in the Middle East.

== Effectiveness of monkey models ==
It is claimed by some that most Soviet-designed tanks and aircraft engaged by western forces during the last decades were allegedly monkey models, and that this must be kept in mind when trying to assess the capabilities of real Soviet-era equipment versus those of contemporary western designs. An alleged example of this is the dismal performance of Iraqi T-72 models during the 1991 Gulf War and the 2003 invasion of Iraq.

In each conflict, Iraqi T-72s failed to destroy a single M1 Abrams tank, even after scoring direct hits. On the other hand, a publication from the early 80s claims that the 125 mm 2A46 gun "will penetrate the armor of any current or future NATO tank at ranges greater than 2,000 meters." A decade later, Robert H. Scales insisted that the 125mm gun "could penetrate the Abrams (frontal armor) at 1,000 meters," provided it was using modern ammunition. The performance discrepancy can be explained as being due to the Iraqis using substandard ammunition for their guns and operating a mix of tank monkey models and their own locally produced variant, the Lion of Babylon.

== See also ==
- History of the tank
- List of Soviet tanks
- Soviet Army

== Sources ==
- Milsom, John (1975). Russian Tanks, 1900-1970: The Complete Illustrated History of Soviet Armoured Theory and Design. Galahad Books. ISBN 0-88365-052-5.
- Suvorov, Viktor (1982). Inside the Soviet Army. New York: Macmillan Publishing Co., Inc. ISBN 0-02-615500-1.
- Zaloga, Steven et al. (1993). T-72 Main Battle Tank 1974-1993. Oxford: Osprey. ISBN 1-85532-338-9.
- Armed Forces Journal International - Volume 118.
- Scales, Robert H. (1994). Certain victory : the U.S. Army in the Gulf War. Potomac Books. ISBN 0-02-881111-9.
