= Sprut anti-tank gun =

2A45 Sprut-A
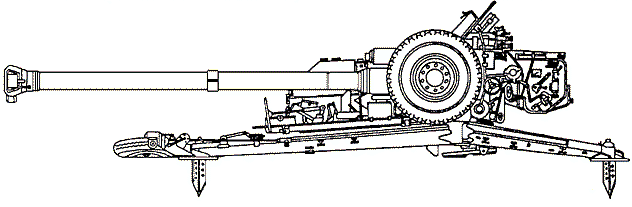
- Sprut anti-tank gun
- Type: Anti-tank gun
- Place of origin: Soviet Union/Russia

Service history
- In service: 1989–present
- Used by: See operators

Production history
- Designer: Petrov Design Bureau
- Designed: late 1980s
- Manufacturer: Artillery Plant Number 9
- Produced: 1989–present
- Variants: See models

Specifications
- Mass: Transport: 6,500 kg (14,300 lb); Self-propelled: 6,800 kg (15,000 lb); Firing: 6,575 kg (14,495 lb)
- Length: Transport: 7.12 m (23 ft 4 in); Self-propelled: 6.79 m (22 ft 3 in)
- Barrel length: Bore: 51 calibres Bore axis: 0.925 m (3 ft 0.4 in)
- Width: 2.66 m (8 ft 9 in)
- Height: Transport: 2.09 m (6 ft 10 in); Self-propelled: 2.35 m (7 ft 9 in)
- Crew: 7
- Caliber: 125 mm (4.9 in)
- Recoil: Hydro-pneumatic
- Carriage: tripod
- Elevation: -6° to 25°
- Traverse: 360°
- Rate of fire: 6-8 rpm
- Effective firing range: 2,000 m (2,200 yd) (APFSDS); 5,000 m (5,500 yd) (9M119 Svir ATGM); 12,000 m (13,000 yd) (HE)
- Operational range: 50 km (55,000 yd) (in APU mode)
- Maximum speed: 14 km/h (8.7 mph) (in APU mode)

2A45 and 2A45M are the respective GRAU designations of the Sprut-A and Sprut-B (Russian for octopus or kraken) Soviet smoothbore 125 mm anti-tank guns.

== Development ==
The 2A45M was created in the late 1980s by the Petrov Design Bureau at Artillery Plant Number 9 (OKB-9), which was also responsible for the 122 mm howitzer 2A18 (D-30).

== Description (Sprut-B) ==
A feature of the Sprut-B is its integrated engine, which can propel the gun on relatively flat surfaces (up to 15 degrees of slope) and at 14 km/h on roads. This gives the gun a measure of mobility on the battlefield. Changing gun position from travelling to firing takes 90 seconds; the reverse takes two minutes. Such guns are known in Russian as "self-moving" (самодвижущиеся) in contrast to self-propelled (самоходные), and outside of battle it is towed by an MT-LB.

The gun has a crew of seven. An OP4M-48A direct fire sight is used in daylight, and a 1PN53-1 night-vision sight is used at night. For indirect fire, 2Ts33 iron sights are used, with a PG-1m panoramic sight. The gun can reliably engage targets two metres high at a distance of 2,000 metres.

The barrel features a thermal sleeve to prevent temperature changes affecting the accuracy. The gun uses the same semi-fixed ammunition as the T-64, T-72, T-80, and T-90 tanks.

With the addition of the 9S53 laser fire-control system, the gun can fire laser guided projectiles such as the 9M119 Svir or 9K120 Refleks.

== Ammunition ==
The gun uses the same ammunition as the D-81 series of guns used on the T-64, T-72, T-80 and T-90 tanks.

== Models ==
- 2A45 Sprut-A

Stationary towed gun variant.

- 2A45M Sprut-B

Self-propelled towed gun variant that can move under its own power with the addition of wheels and a power unit.

== Operators ==
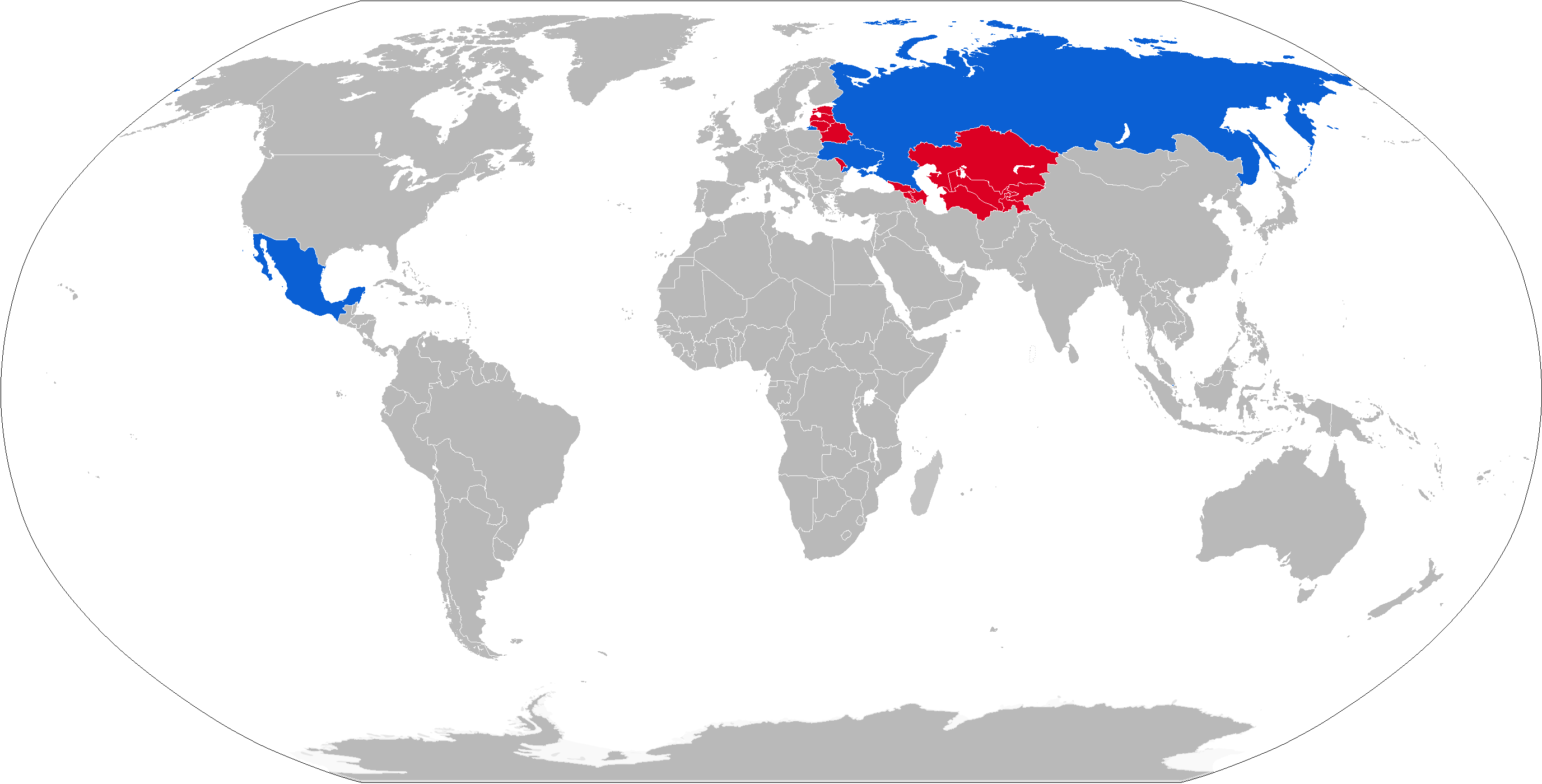
Map of Sprut operators in blue and former operators in red

=== Current operators ===
- Vietnam: 2 bought from Russia in late 1992
- Mexico
- Russia
- Ukraine: made under license, by KMDB, in the city of Kharkiv.

=== Former operators ===
- Soviet Union passed construction license to successor states
- Belarus

== See also ==
- 125 mm smoothbore ammunition
- 2A46 125 mm gun - Soviet–Russian tank-mounted
- List of Soviet tanks
