= KSP-76 =

KSP-76 GAZ-68
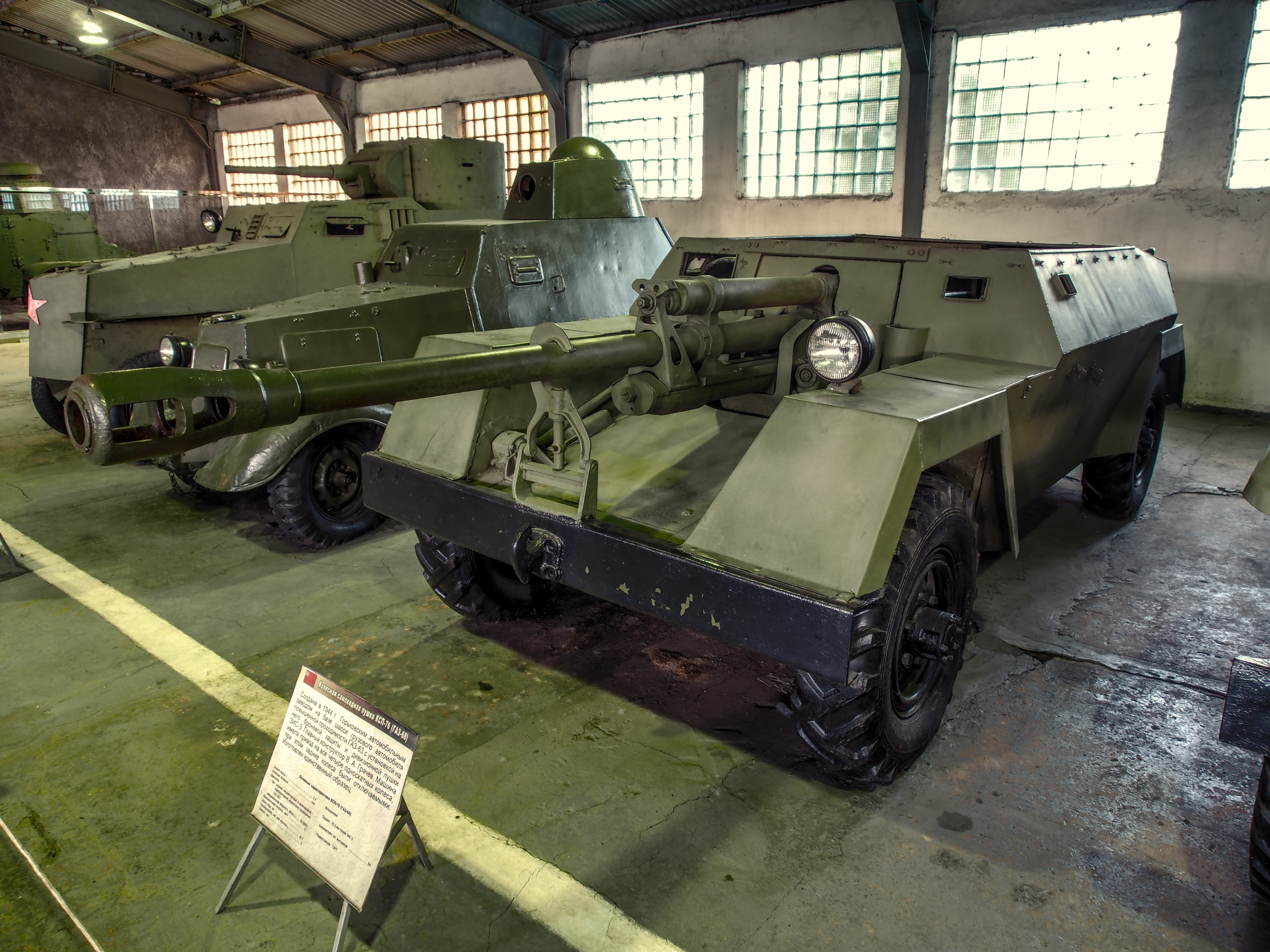
- KSP-76 on display at the Kubinka Tank Museum
- Type: Wheeled assault gun/tank destroyer
- Place of origin: Soviet Union

Production history
- Designer: GAZ
- Manufacturer: GAZ
- Produced: 1944
- No. built: 1 prototype

Specifications
- Mass: 5.34 to 5.4 t (5.26 to 5.31 long tons; 5.89 to 5.95 short tons)
- Length: 3.3 m (10 ft 10 in) (hull)
- Width: 2.05 m (6 ft 9 in)
- Height: 1.55 m (5 ft 1 in)
- Crew: 3
- Armor: 7 mm (0.28 in)
- Main armament: 76 mm ZiS-3 cannon
- Engine: GAZ-11; 85 hp
- Power/weight: 15.9 hp/t
- Maximum speed: 77 km/h (48 mph) on road, 62.5 km/h (38.8 mph) off road

The KSP-76, also known by its factory designation GAZ-68, was a Soviet wheeled assault gun that began development in 1943. It mounted a 76 mm divisional gun M1942 (ZiS-3) gun on a lightweight chassis in an attempt to provide support for scout and airborne units. The light chassis proved unable to withstand repeated firings of the gun and the project never got beyond the prototype stage.

== Description ==
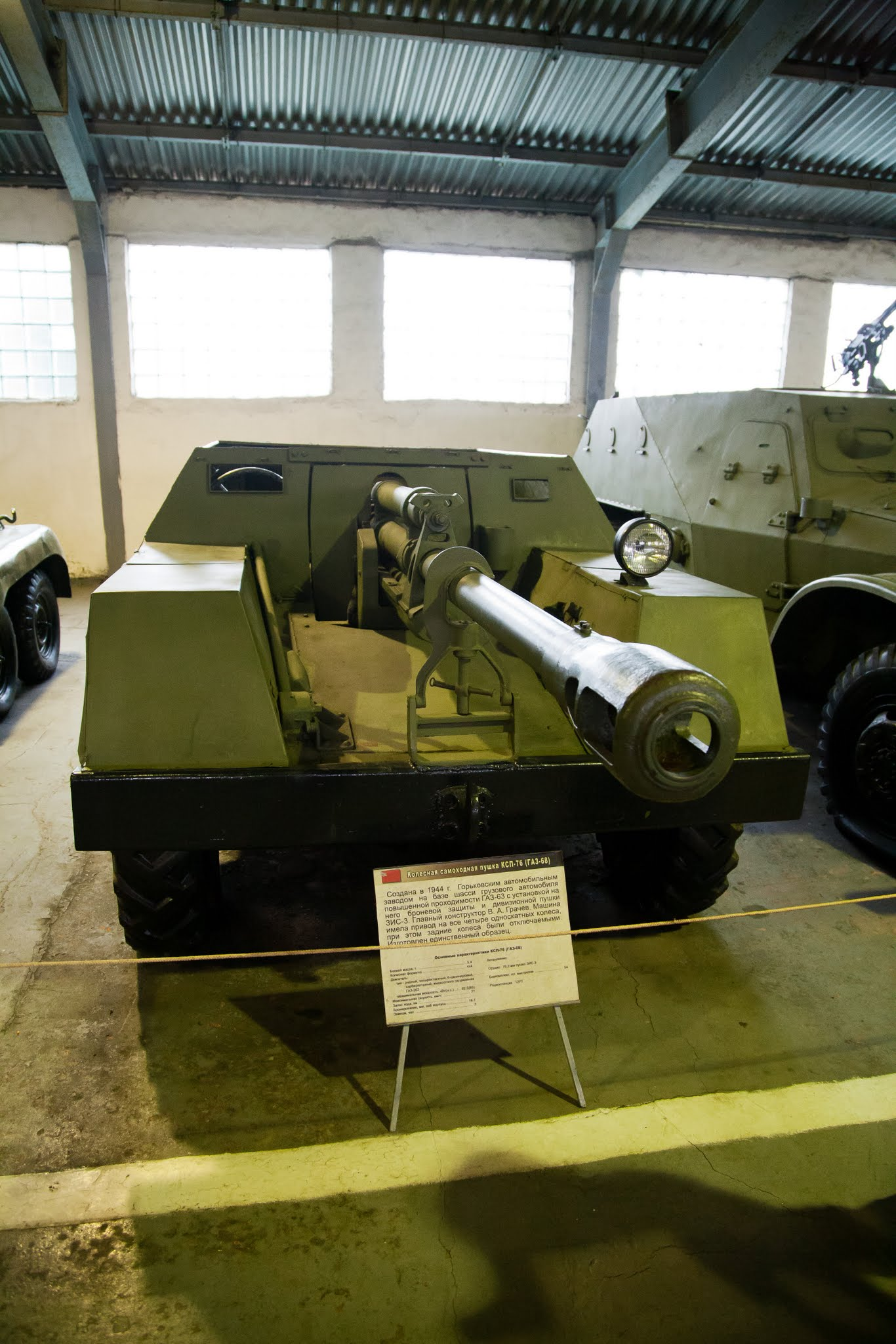
KSP-76 in the Kubinka Tank Museum

The KSP-76 had a crew of three. It consisted of a commander/gunner, gunner/loader, and driver. The hull was divided into three parts. The gun was mounted at the front, the fighting compartment was located at the middle, and the engine was found in the rear. The fuel tank, which had a capacity of 140 liters, was placed to the left of the engine. Fifty four rounds of 76.2mm ammunition were provided.

== History ==
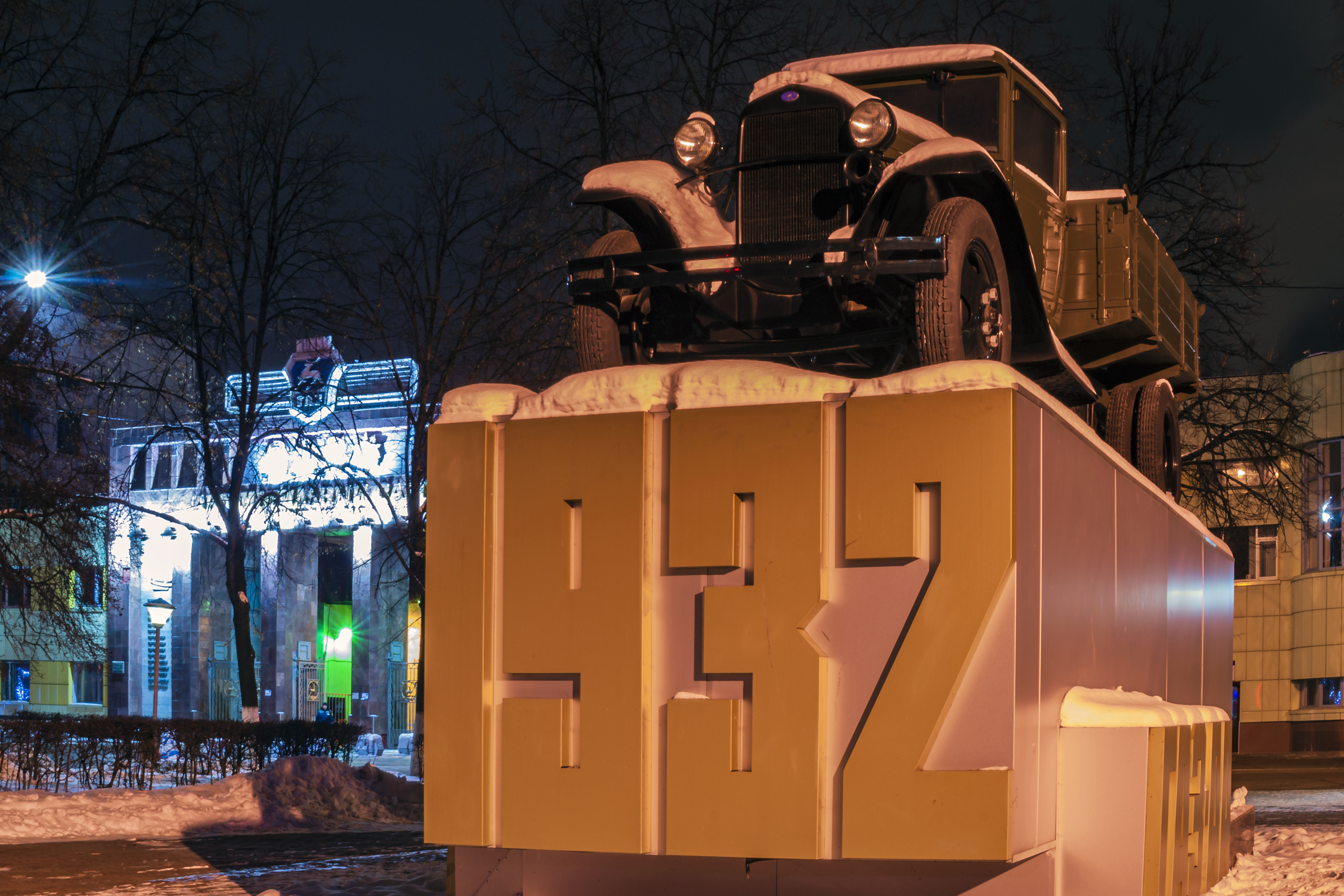
Gorky Automobile Plant (Monument)

Soon after the battle on the Kursk Bulge, the designers of the Gorky Automobile Plant proposed the development of a new self-propelled artillery installation. This combat vehicle, as conceived by the authors of the project, was to supplement the existing SU-76 in the troops, as well as provide greater mobility of artillery weapons.

To ensure high speed and maneuverability, it was proposed to build a new self-propelled gun not on a tracked, but on a wheeled chassis. The initiative to create a wheeled self-propelled gun with a 76-mm gun in August 1943 was made by the leading designer of the GAZ V.A. Grachev.

He was supported by the design bureau and factory management. The proposed concept interested the military, as a result of which the People’s Commissariat for Medium Machine Building and the Main Armored Directorate of the Red Army were allowed to start developing the project.

Work on a new project, which received the designation "izdeliye 68-SU", started in October 43rd. A little later, the project changed its name to GAZ-68.

Design work went pretty fast. Already in December 1943, a wooden model of a promising self-propelled guns on a wheeled chassis was assembled at the Gorky Automobile Plant. In mid-December of the 43rd, GAZ designers sent design documentation to the GBTU. After performing some improvements proposed by the Main Armored Directorate, the project was approved. The permission to build the GAZ-68 prototype was obtained on February 7, 1944. It is noteworthy that by this time another designation of self-propelled guns appeared in the documents - KSP-76 (“Wheel self-propelled gun with a 76-mm gun”).

Without waiting for the completion of the design work, the design bureau began to transfer the documentation for the new project to the car factory workshops. Thanks to this, despite the loading of the enterprise, the production of the first KSP-76 armored hull was completed in early April, and after about a month the finished machine left the assembly shop.

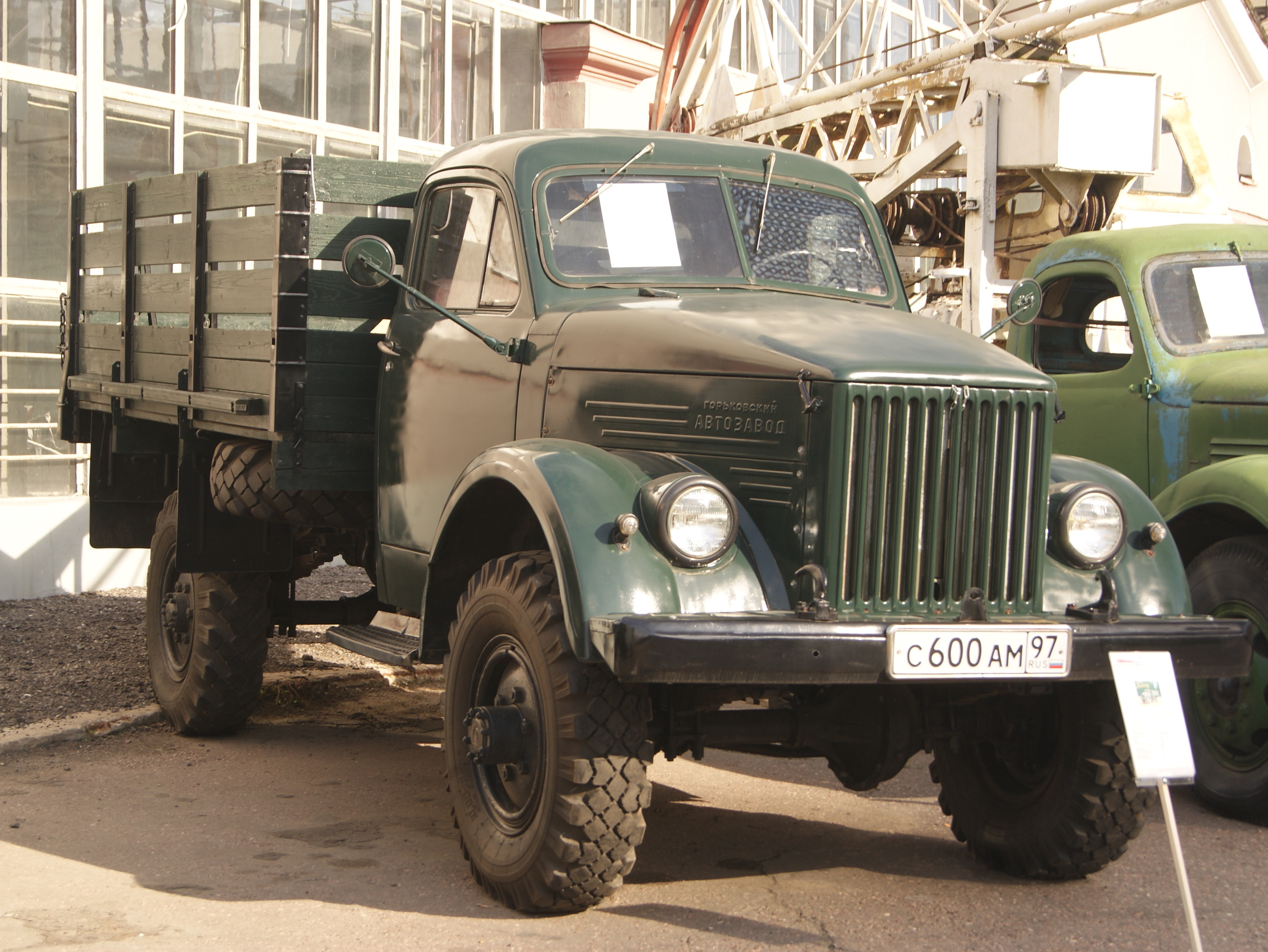
GAZ-63 Truck, model use for KSP-76 chassis

Significantly reduce the development time of a promising self-propelled guns helped the use of a ready-made chassis. As the basis for KSP-76, the all-wheel drive chassis of the GAZ-63 truck, (truck created before the war, but was never put into mass production), was chosen. The design of this 4x4 truck started in the spring of 1938, and two prototypes were built in March 39th. Subsequently, the Gorky Automobile Plant was engaged in testing and refining the truck, but the outbreak of war led to a slowdown or suspension of all promising projects.

The GAZ-63 project was remembered only in 1943. First, in connection with the development of a promising wheeled self-propelled guns, and later in the context of creating a new all-wheel drive truck for the needs of the army and the national economy. In the fall of the 43rd even a new prototype of the machine was built, which differed from previous prototypes in the cab and some design details. The chassis remains the same.

As conceived by V.A. Grachev and his staff, using the existing and tested machine as the basis for a new project was supposed to accelerate the development of the KSP-76, as well as facilitate the serial construction and maintenance of self-propelled guns. In addition, the wheeled chassis was supposed to provide fairly high performance when driving on roads and, in some cases, off-road. A wheeled self-propelled gun could complement existing tracked vehicles.

Since the truck was chosen as the basis for KSP-76, the designers of GAZ Yu.N. Sorochkin and A.N. Kirillov had to develop an original armored hull designed to protect the crew and machine components from bullets and shell fragments. The hull was a structure of complex shape, welded from armor panels of various thicknesses.

The frontal leaf was originally 10 mm thick, later this parameter increased to 16 mm. The sides and bottom had a thickness of 7 and 4 mm, respectively, and the engine compartment on top was covered with a 5 mm sheet. In front of the casing, between the wheel arches, a flat platform was provided for mounting the gun. Behind this platform was an inclined frontal sheet of the hull, behind which was the fighting compartment. The latter had no roof. The aft of the hull had a characteristic beveled shape. Due to the use of several interesting layout solutions, the KSP-76 self-propelled gun hull had an acceptable level of protection, but its weight did not exceed 1140 kg.

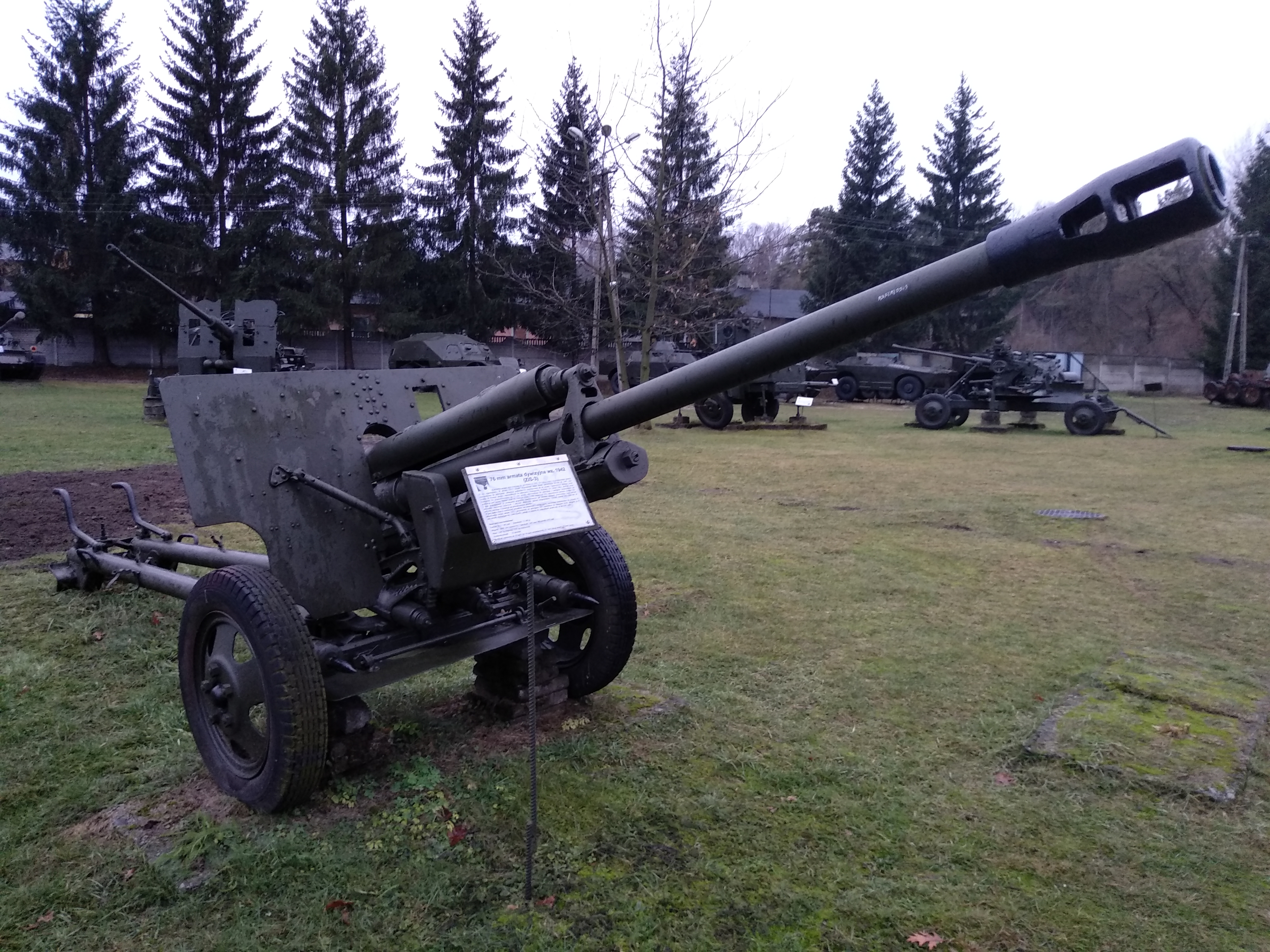
Gun model adapted to the KSP-76

A 76 mm ZiS-3 gun was located in the front of the machine on a machine that allowed it to be guided in two planes. The original placement of the gun between the wheel arches, significantly rising above the level of the site, was proposed to reduce the height of the entire combat vehicle in order to increase survivability and stability during movement. The machine tool allowed to direct it in a horizontal plane within a sector width of 37 °. Permissible angles of vertical aiming are from -3 ° to + 15 °.

The characteristics of the ZiS-3 gun after installation on a wheeled vehicle remained almost unchanged. The restrictions on the vertical aiming angles led to a certain reduction in the maximum firing range (which, however, did not cause any complaints, since the KSP-76 was supposed to fire only direct fire), and the rate of fire was limited to 8 shots per minute. In the fighting compartment managed to place 58 unitary shells of caliber 76 mm. 41 ammunition was placed in the aft position in a horizontal position, 17 - to the right of the gun in a vertical position.

Inside the fighting compartment, to the right of the breech of the gun, there was a control post with the driver’s workplace. To the left of the gun was the sight and gunner’s position. The gunner also served as commander and radio operator. Behind the gunner placed a folding seat loader. To monitor the environment, the crew had observation instruments, and at the commander's workplace there was a panorama. As an additional weapon for self-defense, two PPSh submachine guns with 12 magazines (852 rounds) were offered.

The engine-transmission compartment was located in the rear of the hull. The GAZ-11 engine was installed with a shift from the machine axis to the right by 276 mm. To the left of the engine and transmission units, an insulated fuel tank of 140 liters and the main ammunition storage were placed. To cool the engine, a radiator grill was provided in the aft sheet. The basis of the power plant of the KSP-76 self-propelled gun was a GAZ-202 carburetor gasoline engine with an output of 85 hp. A five-speed manual gearbox with remote control from the driver's seat was paired with the engine. From the gearbox, the torque was transmitted to two drive axles using a transfer case and three driveshafts. The shafts and gearbox were in a special tunnel that ran along the car body. The front axle received a permanent drive, the rear - disabled.

Both self-propelled axles were made rigid and attached to the chassis frame using leaf springs with hydraulic shock absorbers. The wheels of the prototype were equipped with single-wheel bulletproof tires. To improve cross-country terrain, tires had developed lugs.

The prototype self-propelled guns GAZ-68 / KSP-76, built in the spring of 1944, clearly demonstrated the advantages of the applied layout solutions. With a total length (with a gun) of 6.35 m and a width of 2.05 m, the self-propelled gun had a height of only 1.55 m. Thus, the KSP-76 with similar fire power was 70 cm lower than the self-propelled gun SU-76, which should have been appropriate way to affect its survivability in combat conditions, but to some extent limited combat capabilities. The combat weight of the machine was 5430 kg.

In late spring 1944, factory tests of a new self-propelled gun started. On the highway, the combat vehicle accelerated to 77 km / h. Cruising on the highway - 580 km. Thanks to the use of the wheeled chassis, KSP-76 had several advantages over the tracked SU-76 and its simplified version of OSU-76, which was being developed at the same time. The wheeled combat vehicle was faster on the highway, quieter and lower. However, tracked self-propelled guns had better performance when traveling over rough terrain.

The first stages of the tests were accompanied by a lot of malfunctions and problems. So, regularly there were breakdowns of the unfinished front axle, gearbox and driveshafts. In addition, it was noted that the combat compartment of the self-propelled guns is insufficient and not too convenient for the crew to work. By mid-autumn, factory tests were completed in Gorky, after which the new self-propelled gun GAZ-68 / KSP-76 could be distilled to the Scientific Testing Armored Testing Ground in Kubinka. It is noteworthy that all the way from Gorky to Kubinka, including icy sections of the highway, wheeled self-propelled guns passed under their own power at an average speed of 60 km/h.

The report on the tests conducted on December 17-24, 1944, noted the advantages of the KSP-76 self-propelled guns associated with the used armored hull design. In particular, they talked about the relatively small mass of the machine and its small dimensions. Accuracy of fire gun ZiS-3 was at the table level. However, as it turned out during the tests, the self-propelled gun should be fired only from a short stop, since when shooting in motion, the accuracy sharply decreased.

The testing commission recommended that the remaining minor design flaws be corrected, after which the GAZ-68 / KSP-76 self-propelled gun could be admitted to military tests in the event of a decision by the Main Artillery Directorate. However, wheeled self-propelled guns were not recommended for adoption. In 1944, in parallel with KSP-76, the OSU-76 self-propelled gun was developed, which was a simplified version of the SU-76.

Having advantages in size, level of protection and maximum speed, wheeled self-propelled guns were losing tracked in combat weight and cross-country ability. Moreover, the effective use of self-propelled guns KSP-76 off-road was considered impossible. Finally, the prospects of the car were influenced by the features of the GAZ-63 project. This truck, although it was tested before the war, was not built in series, which is why the start of production of self-propelled guns at its base could be associated with serious difficulties.

In the absence of prospects, the GAZ-68 / KSP-76 project was closed immediately after the completion of the tests, after the Army concluded that it lacked the mobility for cross-country travel.

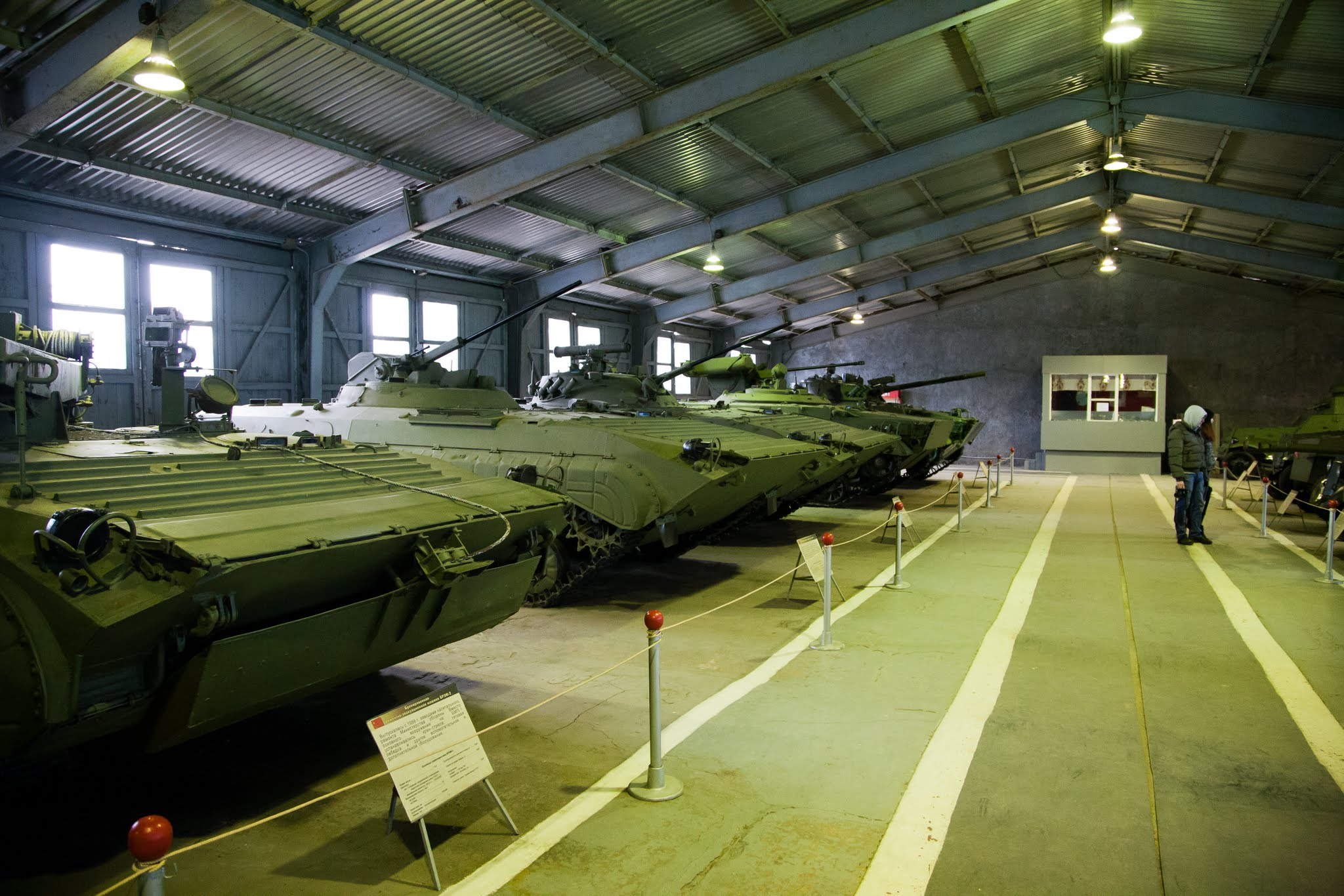
Kubinka tank museum

The only built instance of this self-propelled gun remained in Kubinka. Now it is an exhibit of the museum of armored vehicles.
