= 9M119 Svir/Refleks =

Gun-launched anti-tank missile

9K120 Svir / 9K119 Refleks / 9K119M Refleks-M AT-11 Sniper
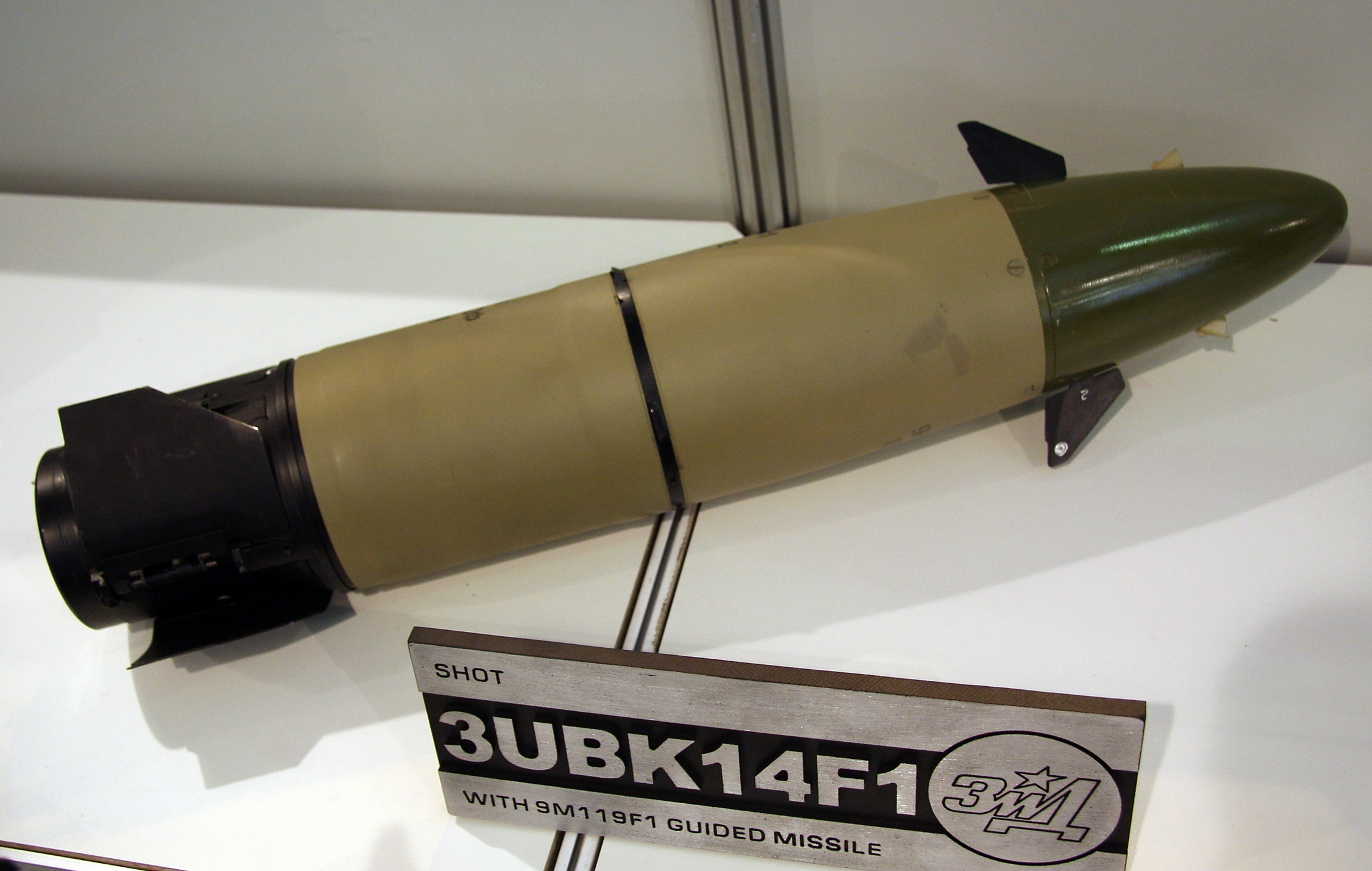
- 9M119F1 missile
- Type: ATGM
- Place of origin: Soviet Union

Service history
- In service: 1985–present
- Used by: Soviet Union; Russia; China; India; Serbia; South Korea
- Wars: First Chechen War; Russo-Ukrainian War

Production history
- Designer: Tula Machinery Design Bureau (Tula KBP)
- Designed: 1980s
- Manufacturer: Degtyarev plant
- Unit cost: $37,500 (2012)
- Produced: 1980s–present
- Variants: 9M119M

Specifications
- Mass: 16.5 / 17.2 kg
- Diameter: 125 mm
- Warhead: Tandem hollow-charge
- Warhead weight: 4.5 kg
- Operational range: 4,000 / 5,000 m
- Maximum speed: Supersonic
- Guidance system: Laser beam riding
- Launch platform: 125 mm smoothbore guns

The 9K120 Svir, 9K119 Refleks, 9K119M Refleks-M (NATO reporting name AT-11 Sniper) are laser beam riding, guided anti-tank missile systems developed in the Soviet Union. Both are designed to be fired from smoothbore 125 mm tank and anti-tank guns (2A45, 2A46 and 2A46M). The name Svir comes from the River Svir, while Refleks means reflex.

== History ==
The first guided anti-tank missile system fired from smoothbore 125 mm tank guns, the 9K112 Kobra, appeared on Soviet T-64B tanks in 1976. However, they were incompatible with the autoloader of the T-72 tanks (while the T-64 also had an autoloader, it was very different from the one in T-72), so the new missile system was developed for T-72.

== 9K120 Svir ==
The Svir is used with the T-72B tank series since 1985.

== 9K119 Refleks ==
The Refleks appeared in 1992 and was installed in T-90 tank series.

It has also been produced by the People's Republic of China for use with its Type 99 tank.

The Indian defence ministry has signed a contract with Bharat Dynamics Limited (BDL), a public sector company under Department of Defence Production, for supplying Invar Anti Tank Guided Missiles to the Indian Army. BDL has been manufacturing these missiles under technical collaboration with Rosoboronexport. A further order worth about Rs.3,000 crores is to be announced shortly to equip Indian T-90 tanks. It can also be fired from the 2A45 Sprut-B anti-tank gun.

== 9K119M Refleks-M ==
9M119M "Refleks-M" missiles (GRAU designation: 3UBK20) can be fired from the T-72B, T-80U, and T-90S through the use of a 1K13-49 sight, are ejected using the 9Kh949 ejecting mechanism, and the rocket motor ignites as soon as the missile exits the barrel. Ram air collected by the air intakes in the nose is used to provide power to move the control fins. The 17.2 kg (37.8 pound) missile is 690 mm (27.1 inches) long and has pop-out fins (with a 250 mm/69 girth span) that aid in guidance. The missile is guided by the modulated laser beam steered by the tank gunner. The missile has a maximum range of 5,000 meters at a speed of 350 meters per second (17.69 seconds max flight time). The Svir/Reflex enables the tank to hit targets at twice the range of the 125mm shells. The tandem warhead can penetrate up to 900 mm of armor (35.4 inches). 9M119M "Refleks-M" was put into service in 1992, and the modernized variant 9M119M1 in the second half of the 1990s. There are also high explosive versions produced named 9M119F and 9M119F1 which are intended to defeat enemy personnel.

== Similar weapons ==
- United States: MGM-51 Shillelagh used with the M551 Sheridan light tank, and the short lived M60A2 MBT.
- United States: XM1111 Mid-Range Munition which was attempted to be developed for the M1A2 SEP Abrams MBT.
- Russia: 9K112 Kobra (AT-8 Songster) is also fired through 125-mm smoothbore gun tubes.
- India: SAMHO fired from 120mm main gun of Arjun MBT.
- Israel: LAHAT, used with their 105 and 120-mm gun tubes.
- France: ACRA 142mm anti-tank missile, tested on a version of the AMX-30 MBT.
- Ukraine: Kombat tandem-warhead ATGM with a 5,000-m effective range, fired from 125-mm smoothbore guns. 950 mm penetration.
- Iran: Reversed engineered version of the Svir with max range of 4,000 meters named Tondar.

== Specifications ==
- Range:
  - Svir: 75 to 4,000 m
  - Refleks: 75 to 5,000 m
- Weight (complete round):
  - Svir: 28 kg
  - Refleks: 24.3 kg
- Missile Weight:
  - Svir: 16.5 kg
  - Refleks: 17.2 kg
- Warhead: Tandem HEAT
- Penetration: 700–900 mm of RHA
- Time of flight to 4,000 m: 11.7 s
- Time of flight to 5,000 m: 17.6 s

== Operators ==
=== Current operators ===
- China
- Cyprus
- Georgia
- Iran
- Iraq: 9K119M Refleks-M, used in Iraqi Army T90
- India
- Morocco: 9K120 variant, used in Moroccan Army T-72Bs.
- Pakistan: According to SIPRI Pakistan received 1,920 9M119 from Belarus by 1999 to be used on its T-80UD, although current status uncertain
- Russia
- Serbia
- Syria: 9K120 Svir and 9K119 Refleks variants used.
- Ukraine: Captured 30 examples from retreating Russian Army positions in Kharkiv oblast September 2022.
- Vietnam

=== Former operators ===
- Soviet Union - Passed on to Russia.
- South Korea - Retired in early 2019, with the T-80U Main battle tanks.

== Bibliography ==
- Jane's Ammunition Handbook 2003–2004.
- RED THRUST STAR : U.S. Forces Command OPFOR Training Program
- FM 3-19.4 : Weapon Appendix
