= MKE 120 MM 55C =

- Type: Smoothbore tank gun
- Place of origin: Turkey

Production history
- Designer: Otokar; Hyundai WIA
- Designed: 2016
- Manufacturer: Mechanical and Chemical Industry Corporation

Specifications
- Mass: Gun barrel: 1,324 kg (2,919 lb); Gun mount: 3,103 kg (6,841 lb)
- Length: 6.6 m (22 ft)
- Barrel length: 55 calibers
- Caliber: 120×570mm
- Rate of fire: 6 rds/min
- Effective firing range: APFSDS-T: 3,000 meters (3,300 yd); TANOK: 6,000 meters (6,600 yd)

The MKE 120 MM 55C gun is a Turkish 120 mm 55 caliber smoothbore gun based on the CN08 120 mm gun produced by the Turkish company Mechanical and Chemical Industry Corporation, used on the Turkish Altay tank. The 120-millimeter (4.7 in) gun has a length of 6.6 meters (22 ft). The gun can fire ammunition with high muzzle velocity, and is made of chrome-plated "special steel".

== Background ==
The MKE 120 MM 55C gun was produced by transferring CN08 120 mm gun production technology from Hyundai WIA in South Korea through the Altay tank development project from 2008 to 2015. MKE modified the design per Altay requirements and produce the gun under license.

The design of the tank gun is the same as CN08, but there are two differences: unlike CN08, thermal sleeve is equipped with static muzzle reference system (SMRS), and Altay's turret does not have breech opening motor and automatic feeding magazine system for autoloader mechanism, so ammunition can only be loaded manually by tank crew and can fire up to 6 rounds a minute.

== Ammunition ==
The gun can fire various types of tank ammunitions including MKE made APFSDS-T, TPCSDS-T Training and High Pressure. The gun is also able to fire Roketsan made TANOK gun-launched 120 mm laser guided anti-tank missile with range of 1-6 km. The tank gun might be able to fire 120×570 mm NATO tank ammunition.

== See also ==
- CN08 120 mm gun: South Korean 120 mm 55-caliber smoothbore gun developed for K2 Black Panther main battle tank.

=== Weapons of comparable role, performance and era ===
- L11A5 120 mm rifled gun: British rifled equivalent, developed by Royal Armament Research and Development Establishment (RARDE) in 1957.
- 2A46 125 mm gun: Russian 125-mm equivalent, developed by Spetstekhnika Design Bureau in 1960s.
- Rheinmetall 120 mm gun: German equivalent, developed by Rheinmetall in 1974.
- CN120-25 120 mm gun: French equivalent, developed by Établissement d'Études et de Fabrication d'Armements de Bourges (EFAB) in 1979.
- EXP-28M1 120 mm rifled tank gun: Experimental British weapon of the late 1970s/early 1980s. Was to have equipped the MBT-80.
- CN120-26 120 mm gun: French equivalent, developed by EFAB in 1980s.
- IMI 120 mm gun: Israeli equivalent, developed by Israeli Military Industries in 1988.
- OTO Breda 120 mm gun: Italian equivalent, developed by OTO Melara in 1988.
- L30A1 120 mm rifled gun: British rifled equivalent, developed by ROF Nottingham in 1989.
- JSW 120 mm gun: Japanese equivalent, developed by Japan Steel Works in 2008.
- 2A82-1M 125 mm gun: New Russian 125-mm equivalent, developed by Uralvagonzavod in 2014.
