= CN08 120 mm gun =

Hyundai WIA CN08
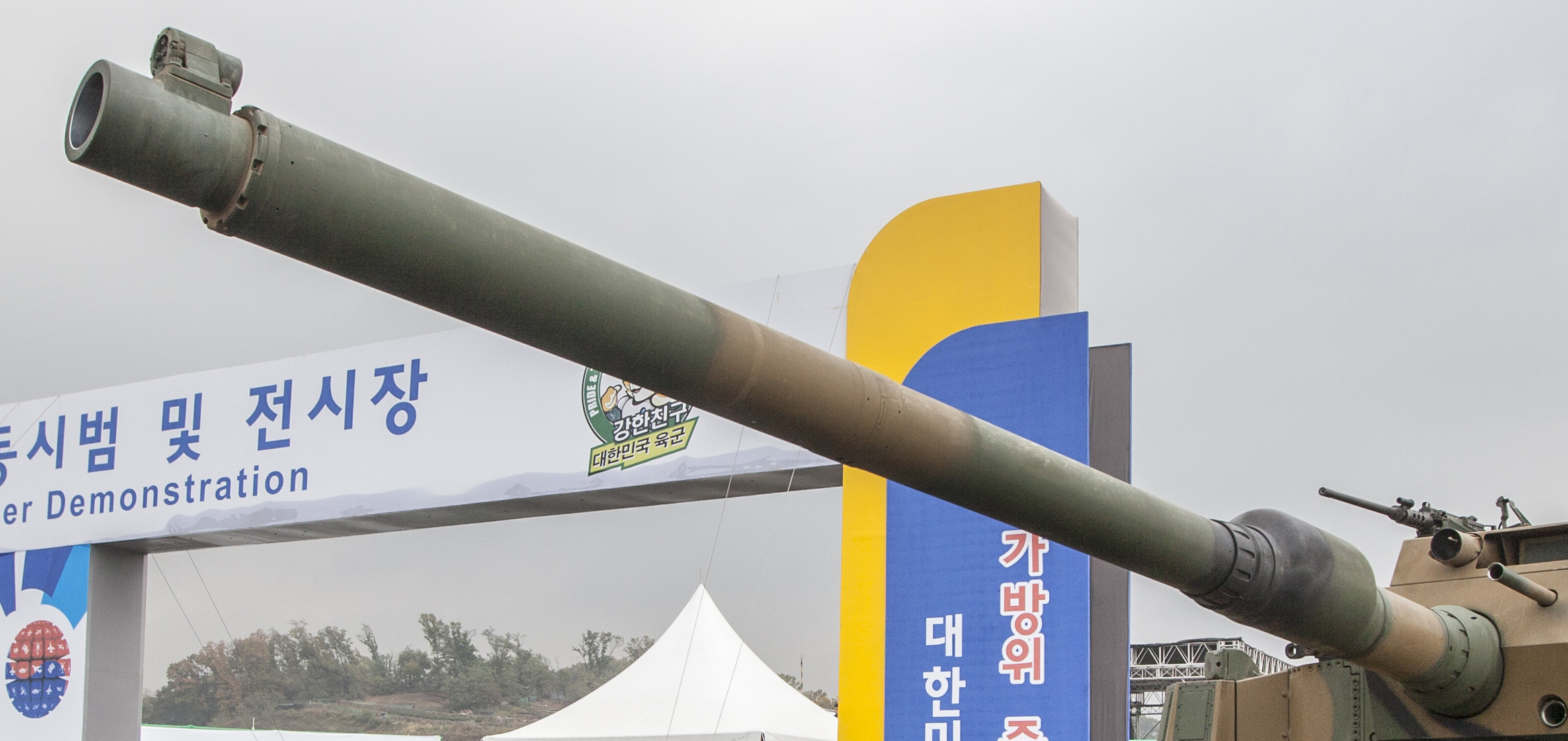
- Gun barrel of the CN08
- Type: Smoothbore tank gun
- Place of origin: South Korea

Service history
- In service: 2014–present
- Used by: See Operators

Production history
- Designer: Agency for Defense Development; WIA
- Designed: 2003–2008
- Manufacturer: Hyundai WIA
- Produced: 2008–present
- Variants: MKE 120 mm gun

Specifications
- Mass: Gun barrel: 1,324 kilograms (2,919 lb); Gun mount: 3,100 kilograms (6,800 lb)
- Length: Gun barrel: 6.600 meters (21.65 ft); Gun mount: 7.118 meters (23.35 ft)
- Caliber: 120×570mm NATO
- Action: Automatic opening and closing mechanism
- Breech: Vertically sliding
- Recoil: Eccentric hydro-pneumatic
- Rate of fire: 10 rds/min
- Muzzle velocity: 1,640 to 1,760 m/s (5,400 to 5,800 ft/s) with K279 APFSDS-T; 1,678 to 1,800 m/s (5,510 to 5,910 ft/s) with K279 Improved APFSDS-T
- Effective firing range: APFSDS: 3,000 meters (3,300 yd); KSTAM-I: 5,000 meters (5,500 yd); KSTAM-II: 8,000 meters (8,700 yd)
- Maximum firing range: APFSDS: 4,000 meters (4,400 yd)
- Feed system: Automatic feeding endless belt magazine

The CN08 (Cannon 08) is a 120 mm 55-caliber smoothbore tank gun produced by Hyundai WIA. It was indigenously developed by the Agency for Defense Development and WIA (now Hyundai WIA) from 2003 to 2008 for the XK2 development project started in 1995. The development was completed after the field test ended in September 2008.

== Design ==
The CN08 is the main armament of the K2 Black Panther, and the gun barrel is applied with internal chrome plating technology for the large-caliber gun. The gun barrel can endure a high explosive force as a result of the increased stiffness and wear resistance provided by this internal chromium surface. The main components, including the breech ring, breech block and thermal sleeve, are simplified and designed lightly, the gun barrel weighs 1,324 kilograms (2,919 lb) and the gun mount weighs 3,100 kilograms (6,800 lb).

The gun mount is composed of an eccentric hydro-pneumatic recoil system with oil reservoir for the gun barrel and is complemented by a bustle-type autoloader powered by a switched reluctance motor (SRM) combined with a breech controller that automatically opens and closes the gun tube, and it can fire up to 10 rounds a minute.

The maximum permissible pressure of the gun barrel is 744 MPa (108,000 psi), and when the tank gun fires an improved K279 APFSDS, the maximum proof pressure is 690 MPa (100,076 psi), and the muzzle velocity is 1,800 m/s (5,900 ft/s). It depends on the type of ammunition, but the effective firing range of the tank gun is 8,000 meters (8,700 yd).

=== Dynamic muzzle reference system ===
The main armament has a dynamic muzzle reference system (DMRS) consisting of a laser reflector, a laser emitter and a vertical sensor unit (VSU). A laser reflector assembly attached to the top of the thermal sleeve is provided to be adapted to a dynamic muzzle reference system to electro-optically measure the accurate position of the muzzle. The mechanical gyroscope type vertical sensor unit, which calculates the lead angle and superelevation in real time to correct the misalignment of the aim, allows the tank to more accurately hit its intended target even when it is maneuvering on irregular terrain.

=== Ammunition ===
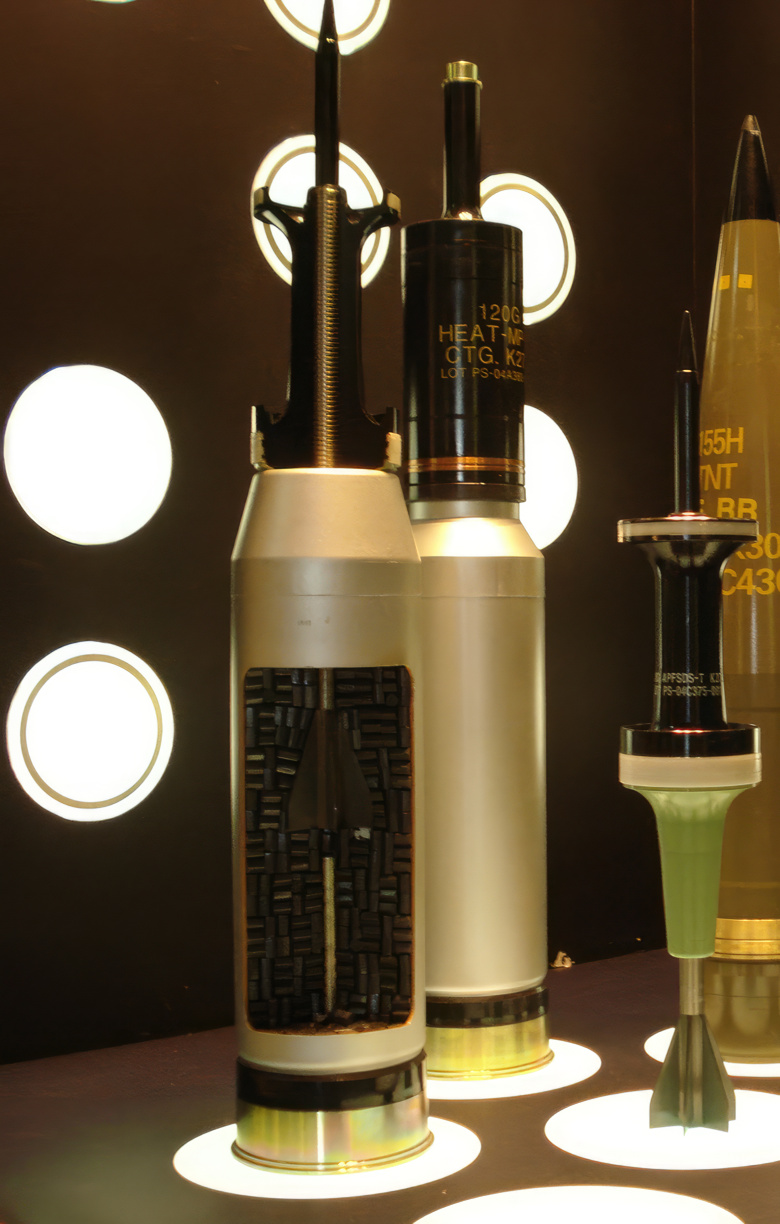
Inside the cartridge of the XK279 APFSDS-T produced by a sequential propellant filling process.

CN08's 120 mm round is produced in Poongsan Corporation, a South Korean ammunition manufacturer, and can fire 120×570 mm NATO tank ammunition.

APFSDS Rounds
Ammunition	Compatible tank gun	Type	Penetrator	Chamber pressure	Muzzle velocity	Ammunition weight	Ammunition length	Sub-projectile weight	Sub-projectile length	Penetrator weight with fin	Penetrator length with fin	Propellant type & weight	RHA penetration	Notes
K276	CN03, CN08, M256	APFSDS-T	Tungsten composite	586 MPa	1700 m/s (L/44)	19.7 kg	973 mm	7.35 kg	703.6 mm		600 mm	K683 (Triple-base)	>600 mm (LoS at 60° obliquity) at 2000 m	Penetrators are manufactured by Cyclic Heat-Treatment and a Double-Cycle Sintering process.
K279 (XK279)	CN08 (Note: K279 is a round compatible with CN03 and M256 as well as CN08, but the high chamber pressure of K279 quickly reduces the life of the barrel, so the manufacturer Poongsan does not recommend using it for CN03 and M256 barrels.)	APFSDS-T	Tungsten composite		1760 m/s (L/55)	21.3 kg	998 mm	8.27 kg	761.6 mm	5 kg		8.6 kg of L15190 (SCDB)	>700 mm (LoS at 60° obliquity) at 2000 m	The penetrator is made of W-Ni-Fe-Mo Alloy.
K279 Improved	CN08	APFSDS-T	Tungsten composite	690 MPa	1800 m/s (Note: When the round reaches the tip of the barrel, the muzzle velocity is 1,794.7 m/s.) (L/55)	21.3 kg	998 mm	8.27 kg	761.6 mm	5 kg		8.6 kg of 19-hole cylinder-type (SCDB)		New DNDA-57 energetic plasticizer for stronger SCDB propellant.

HEAT Rounds
Ammunition	Compatible tank gun	Type	Filler	Chamber pressure	Muzzle velocity	Ammunition weight	Ammunition length	Sub-projectile weight	Sub-projectile length	Filler weight	Propellant type & weight	RHA penetration	Notes
K277	CN03, CN08, M256	HEAT-MP-T	Comp-B	448 MPa	1130 m/s (L/44)	24.5 kg	989 mm	14.31 kg	713.32 mm		K682 (Triple-base)	600 mm	
K280 (XK280)	CN03, CN08, M256	HEAT-MP-T	Comp-B		1400 m/s (L/55)	23 kg	998 mm	11.38 kg	792.75 mm	2.1 kg	K684 (Double-base)		

Guided munition
Ammunition	Compatible tank gun	Type	Filler	Chamber pressure	Muzzle velocity	Ammunition weight	Ammunition length	Sub-projectile weight	Sub-projectile length	Minimum range	Maximum range	RHA penetration	Notes
KSTAM-I	CN08	Terminal guidance	TSCW		750 m/s					2500 m	5000 m		
KSTAM-II	CN08	Fire-and-forget	EFP			21.5 kg	985 mm	9.03 kg		2000 m	8000 m		

== Export ==
=== Turkey ===
On July 29 2008, Hyundai Rotem and Otokar signed a contract for technology transfer and design assistance for the Altay Tank Development Project. This contract includes technology transfer and design assistance for systems, armor package, and 120 mm guns required for Altay tank development.

=== Poland ===
On July 27, 2022, Polish Armaments Group (PGZ) and Hyundai Rotem signed a framework agreement to supply 180 K2s and 820 K2PLs. The agreement will include rapid arms supply and extensive technology transfer from South Korea, and 180 K2s will be produced in South Korea and delivered to Poland from 2022, and 820 K2PLs will be produced in Poland under license from 2026.

== Variants ==
- MKE 120 mm gun: Turkish 120 mm 55 caliber smoothbore gun modified based on CN08 for the Altay tank. The design of the tank gun is the same as CN08, but there are two differences: unlike CN08, thermal sleeve is equipped with Static Muzzle Reference System (SMRS), and Altay's turret does not have breech opening motor and automatic feeding magazine system for autoloader mechanism, so ammunition can only be loaded manually by tank crew and can fire up to 6 rounds a minute.

== Operators ==
A map of operators of the CN08 or its variants

=== Current operators ===
- Poland – Polish Land Forces
- South Korea – Republic of Korea Army

== See also ==
- MKE 120 mm gun: Turkish 120 mm 55-caliber smoothbore gun developed for the Altay MBT.

=== Weapons of comparable role, performance and era ===
- L11A5 120 mm rifled gun: British rifled equivalent, developed by Royal Armament Research and Development Establishment (RARDE) in 1957.
- 2A46 125 mm gun: Russian 125-mm equivalent, developed by Spetstekhnika Design Bureau in 1960s.
- Rheinmetall 120 mm gun: German equivalent, developed by Rheinmetall in 1974.
- CN120-25 120 mm gun: French equivalent, developed by Établissement d'Études et de Fabrication d'Armements de Bourges (EFAB) in 1979.
- EXP-28M1 120 mm rifled gun: Experimental British weapon of the late 1970s/early 1980s. Was to have equipped the MBT-80.
- CN120-26 120 mm gun: French equivalent, developed by EFAB in 1980s.
- IMI 120 mm gun: Israeli equivalent, developed by Israeli Military Industries in 1988.
- OTO Breda 120 mm gun: Italian equivalent, developed by OTO Melara in 1988.
- L30A1 120 mm rifled gun: British rifled equivalent, developed by ROF Nottingham in 1989.
- JSW 120 mm gun: Japanese equivalent, developed by Japan Steel Works in 2008.
- 2A82-1M 125 mm gun: New Russian 125-mm equivalent, developed by Uralvagonzavod in 2014.
