= CN120-26 =

French tank gun

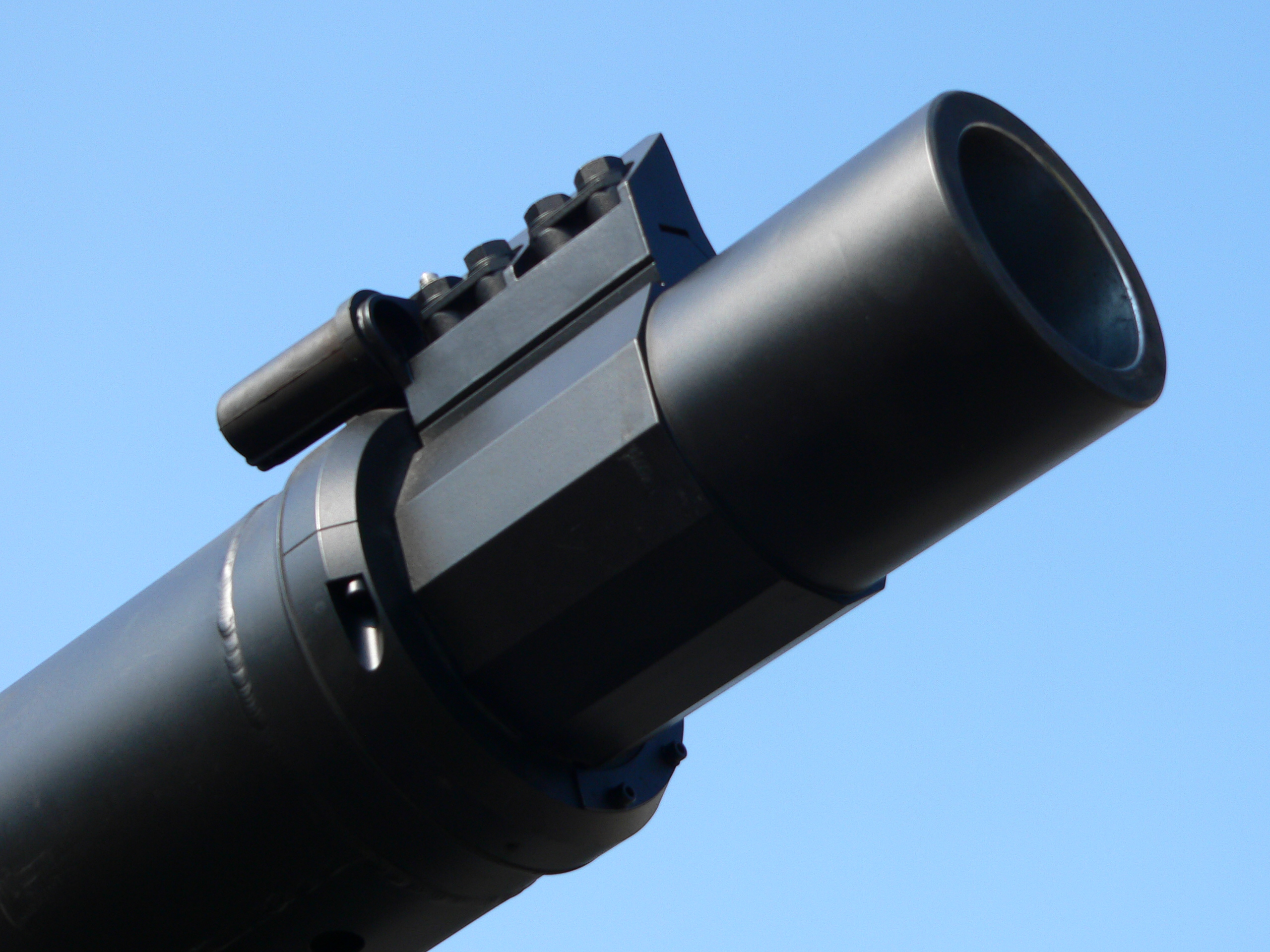
- close-up view of the CN120-26 muzzle
- Type: smoothbore tank gun
- Place of origin: France

Service history
- In service: 1992-present
- Used by: French Army, United Arab Emirates Army, and the Royal Jordanian Army
- Wars: Yemeni Civil War

Production history
- Designer: EFAB of Bourges
- Designed: 1980s
- Manufacturer: Giat Industries
- Produced: 1990-2007
- No. built: 800+

Specifications
- Mass: 2740 kg
- Length: 6.931 m (22 ft 8.9 in)
- Barrel length: 6.24 m (20 ft 6 in) or 52 calibers
- Shell: 120×570mm NATO
- Calibre: 120 mm (4.72 in)
- Action: automatic vertical sliding-wedge breech
- Breech: vertical sliding-wedge
- Recoil: 400 mm
- Elevation: -8° to +17°
- Traverse: 360°
- Rate of fire: up to 12 rounds per minute
- Muzzle velocity: 1790 m/s (APFSDS)
- Feed system: autoloader
- Sights: HL 60 or HL 130

The CN120-26, also simply referred to as Modèle F1 (F1 model) is a French smoothbore 120mm tank gun of 52 calibers designed by the EFAB of Bourges and produced by Giat Industries .

== Description ==
The 120 mm smoothbore gun F1 has been designed for installation in the Leclerc main battle tank. The smooth-bore gun is chrome-plated, fitted with a thermal sleeve and has a vertical sliding breech mechanism. It is also fitted with a muzzle reference system (MRS) and the tropicalized variant of the Leclerc is fitted with a compressed air system for removing propellant fumes.

In the Leclerc application, the gun is fed by a 22-rounds bustle-mounted automatic loader designed by Creusot-Loire Industries. The 120 mm F1 gun fires the same 120×570mm ammunition as the German Rh-120 and American M256 smoothbore guns. The French 120 mm F1 gun is, however, 1 m longer than the L/44 version of the Rh-120, which increases muzzle velocity and armour penetration of APFSDS projectiles; it also gives a longer effective range.

== Additional specifications ==
- Maximum service chamber pressure: 670 MPa (97,000 psi)
- Recoil effort at trunnions: 550 kN (APFSDS fired at +51 °C)
- Overall weight: 2740 kg
- Recoiling gun mass: 1995 kg

== Operators ==
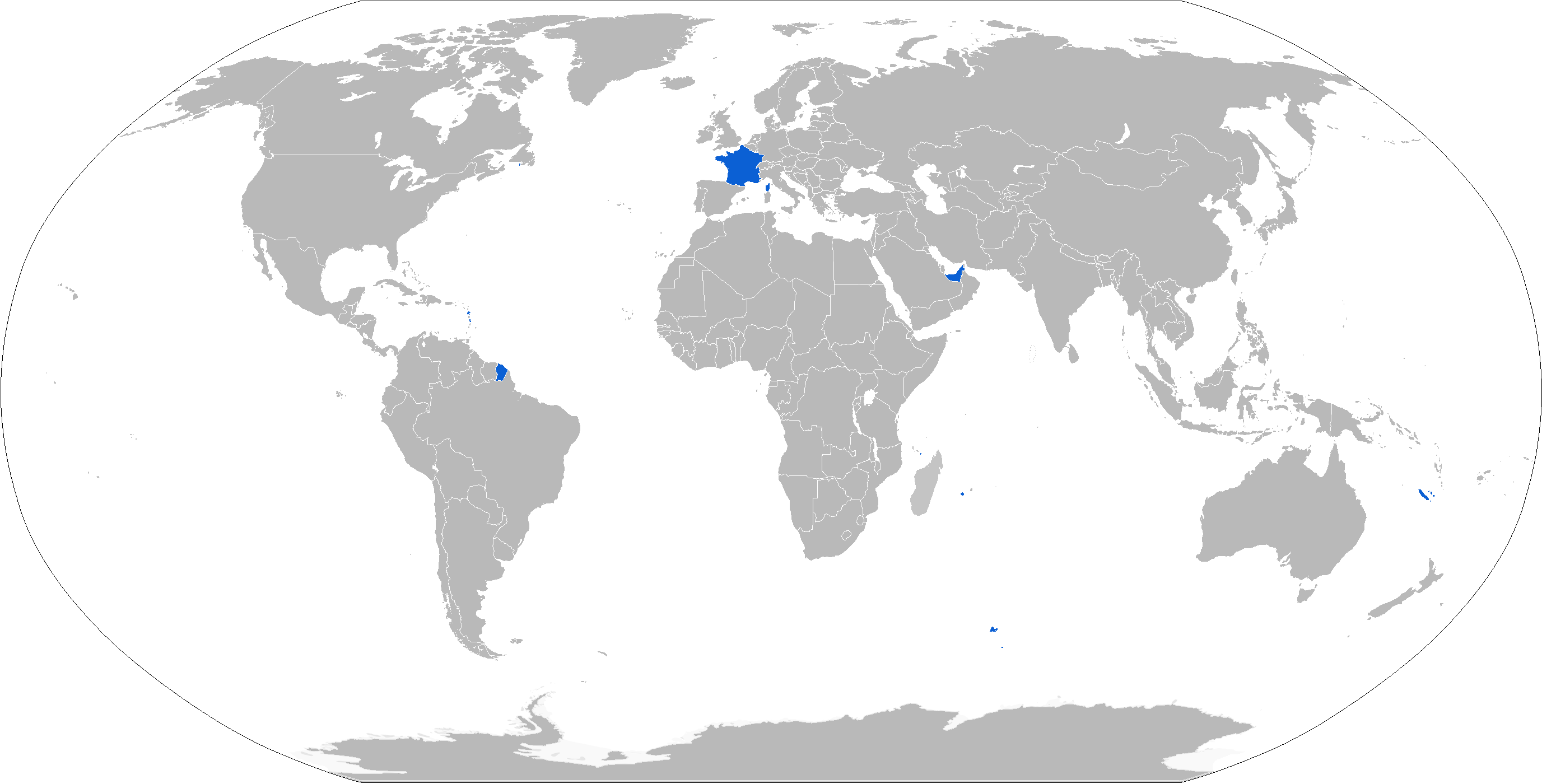
Map with CN120-26 operators in blue

=== Current operators ===
- France
- United Arab Emirates
- Jordan
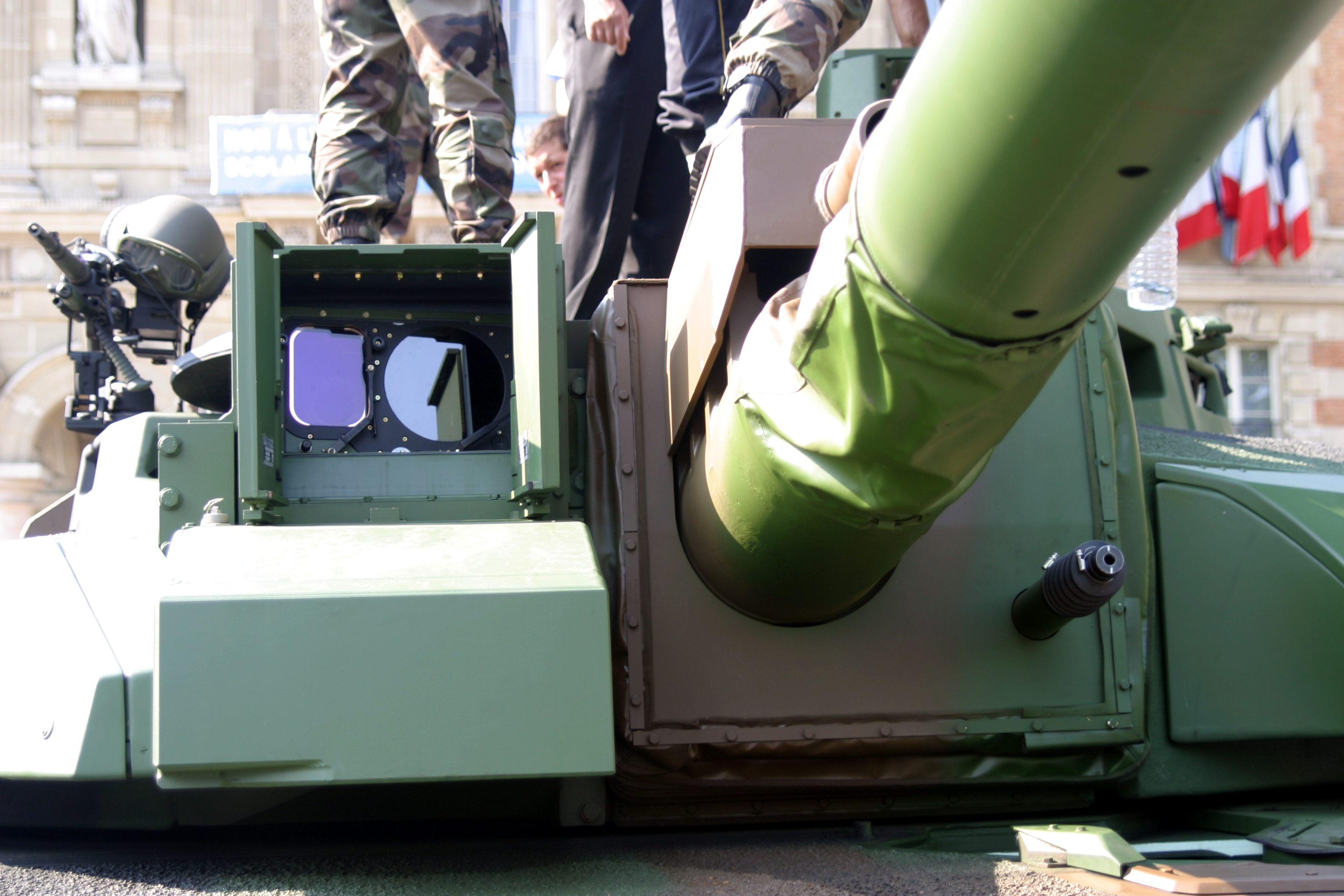
Base of the gun on a Leclerc

== See also ==
- CN120-25 120 mm gun: French equivalent, developed by Établissement d'Études et de Fabrication d'Armements de Bourges (EFAB) in 1979.

=== Weapons of comparable role, performance and era ===
- L11A5 120 mm rifled gun: British rifled gun, developed by Royal Armament Research and Development Establishment (RARDE) in 1957.
- 2A46 125 mm gun: Russian 125-mm equivalent, developed by Spetstekhnika Design Bureau in 1960s.
- Rheinmetall 120 mm gun: German equivalent, developed by Rheinmetall in 1974.
- EXP-28M1 120 mm rifled tank gun: Experimental British weapon of the late 1970s/early 1980s. Was to have equipped the MBT-80.
- IMI 120 mm gun: Israeli equivalent, developed by Israeli Military Industries in 1988.
- OTO Breda 120 mm gun: Italian equivalent, developed by OTO Melara in 1988.
- L30A1 120 mm rifled gun: British rifled equivalent, developed by ROF Nottingham in 1989.
- JSW 120 mm gun: Japanese equivalent, developed by Japan Steel Works in 2008.
- CN08 120 mm gun: South Korean equivalent, developed by Agency for Defense Development (ADD) and WIA in 2008.
- 2A82-1M 125 mm gun: New Russian 125-mm equivalent, developed by Uralvagonzavod in 2014.
- MKE 120 mm tank gun: Turkish equivalent, developed by Otokar and Hyundai WIA in 2016.
