= IMI 120 mm gun =

IMI 120 mm MG251 & MG253 tank gun
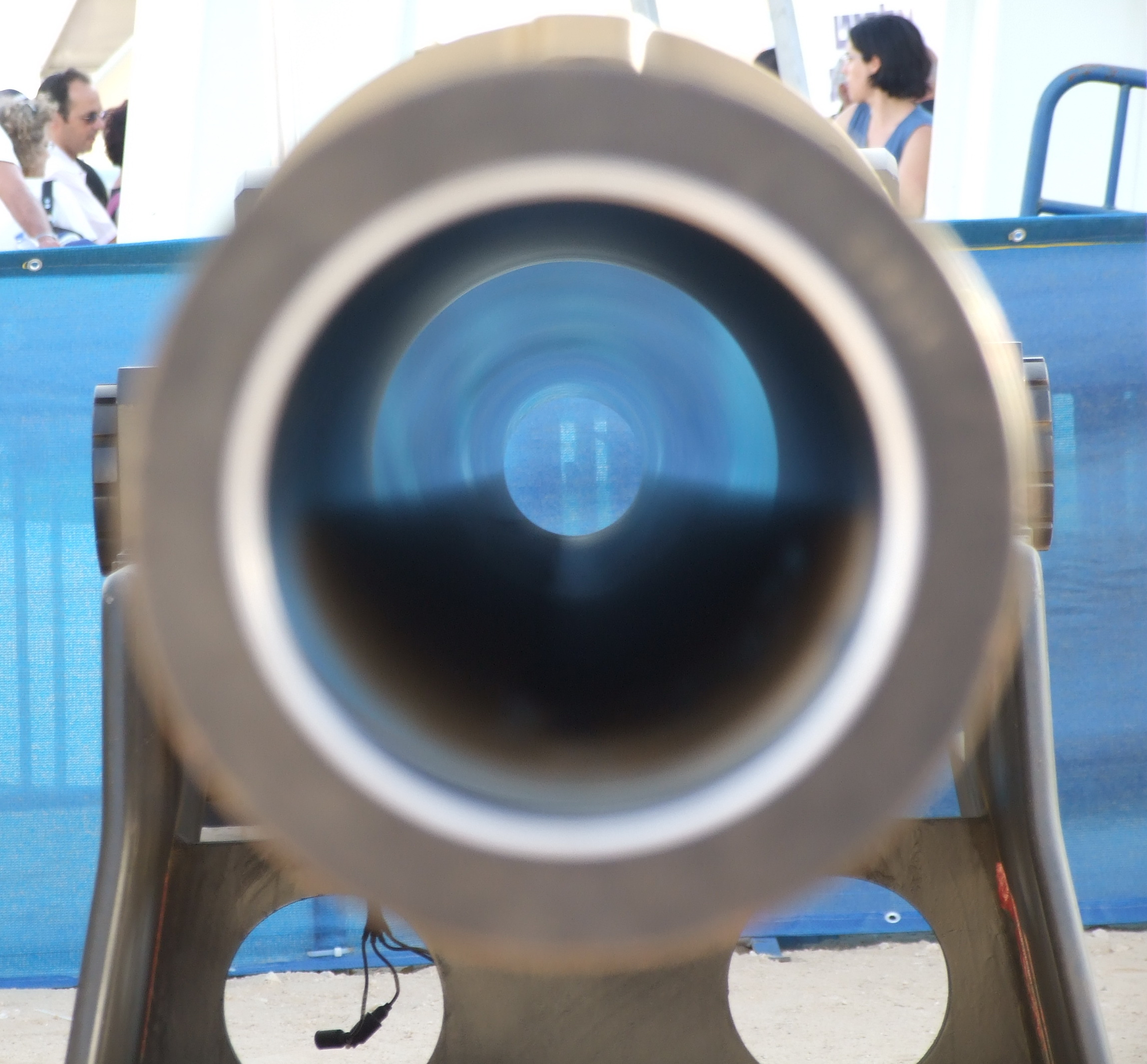
- MG253 tank gun
- Type: smoothbore tank gun
- Place of origin: Israel

Service history
- In service: MG251: 1989–present; MG253: 2003–present
- Used by: see the operators section

Production history
- Manufacturer: Israeli Military Industries
- Produced: 1988–present
- Variants: MG251; MG251-LR; MG253

Specifications
- Mass: 2,900 kilograms (6,400 lb)
- Length: 5.3 meters (17 ft)
- Caliber: 120×570mm
- Recoil: MG251: 300 millimeters (12 in); MG253: 430 millimeters (17 in)

The IMI 120 mm gun is an L44 smoothbore tank gun designed and produced by Israeli Military Industries (IMI). It is widely confused as a licensed production of the Rheinmetall L44 tank gun, however it was developed by IMI from 1983 to 1988, to meet the requirements of the Israel Defense Forces' Merkava Mark III main battle tank, i.e. a narrower mount like in the M60, both tanks designed around a 105 mm gun.

It was first revealed in 1989 when it was shown to be the main armament of the Merkava Mark III. In 1990 the Israel Defense Prize was awarded to Israeli Military Industries for this development, which gave Israel the means to produce tank guns independently.

== Design ==
This tank gun is very similar to the Rheinmetall L44 versions installed on the German Leopard 2, American M1 Abrams, South Korean K1A1, and Japanese Type 90 main battle tanks. However, it has a different recoil system, consisting of an optimized concentric retarder and pneumatic recuperator, and more compact overall dimensions, not exceeding those of the existing 105 mm M68 rifled gun of the Merkava Marks I, II, and the M60 tank.

== Variants ==
There are three variants of the IMI 120 mm gun: the MG251, fitted with a thermal sleeve developed by Vishay Intertechnology and provided with a fume extractor which can be removed for maintenance without disturbing the actual sleeve, its improved version MG251-LR and the MG253, with a thermal sleeve developed by VIDCO Industries and a new compressed gas recoil system.

They fire a family of ammunition developed by IMI, can fire French, German or US 120 mm NATO ammunition if required, and also fire the LAHAT anti-tank guided missile.

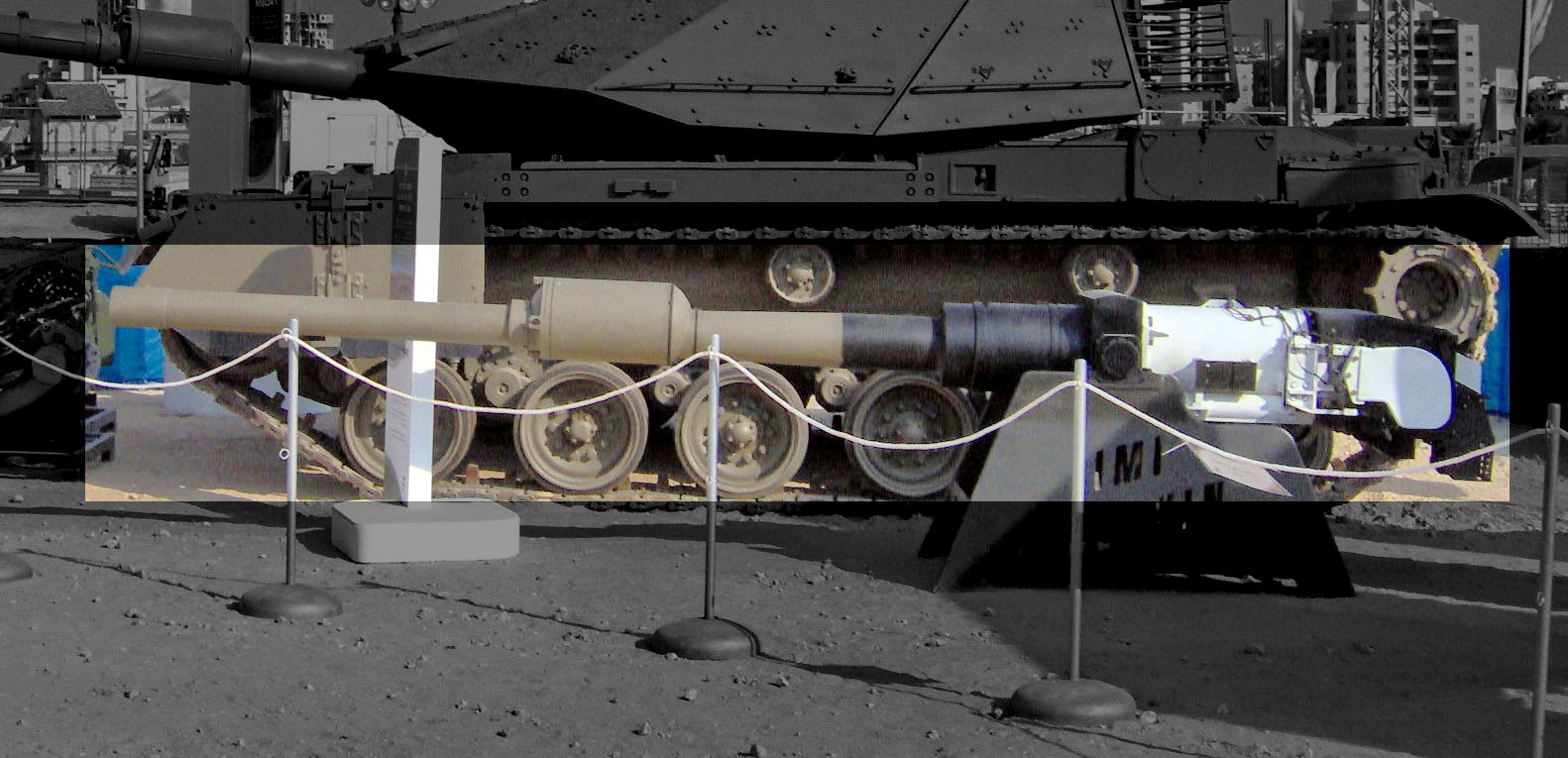
IMI 120 mm gun

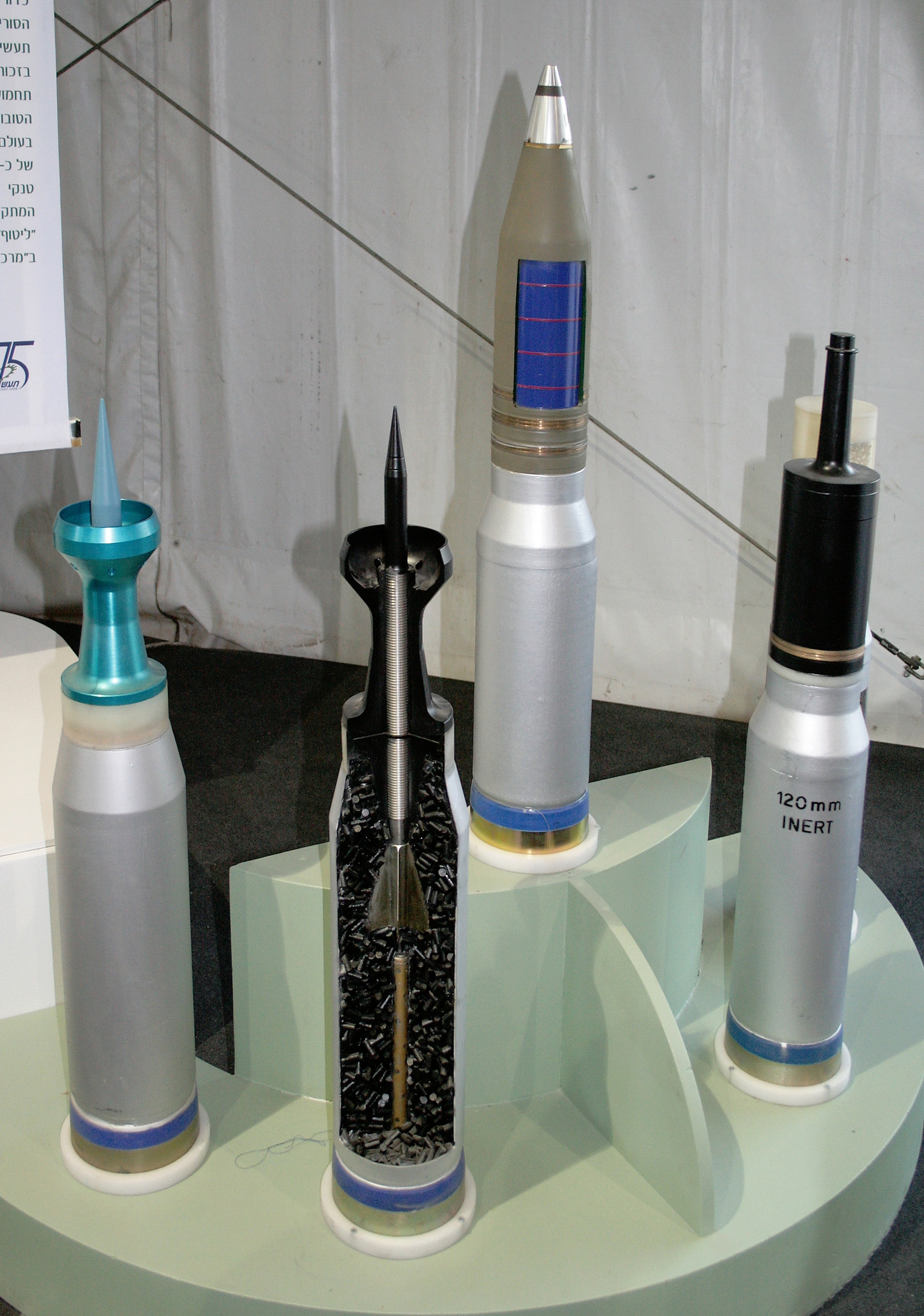
Different shells for IMI 120 mm gun

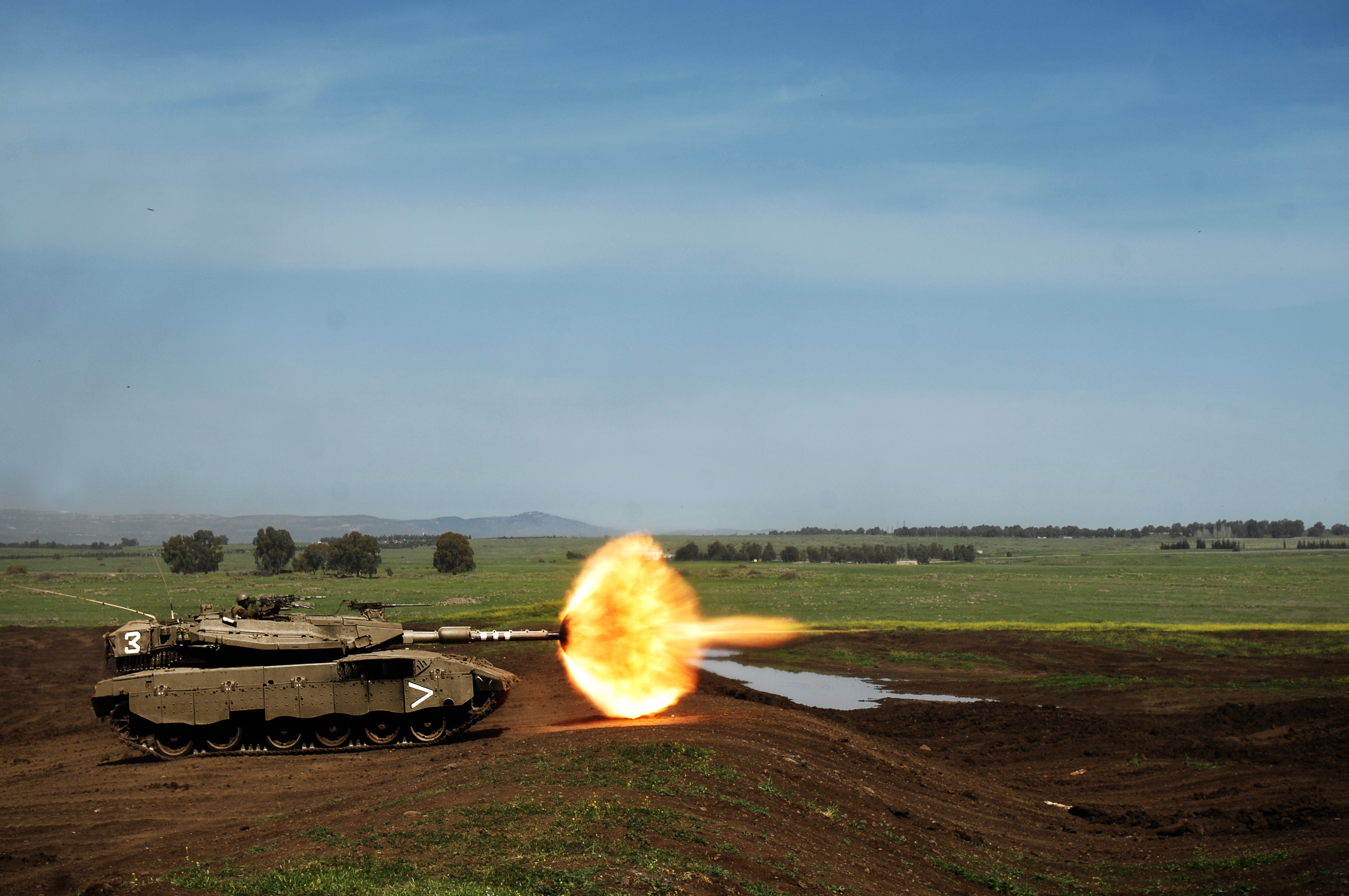
Muzzle flash of the IMI 120 mm gun

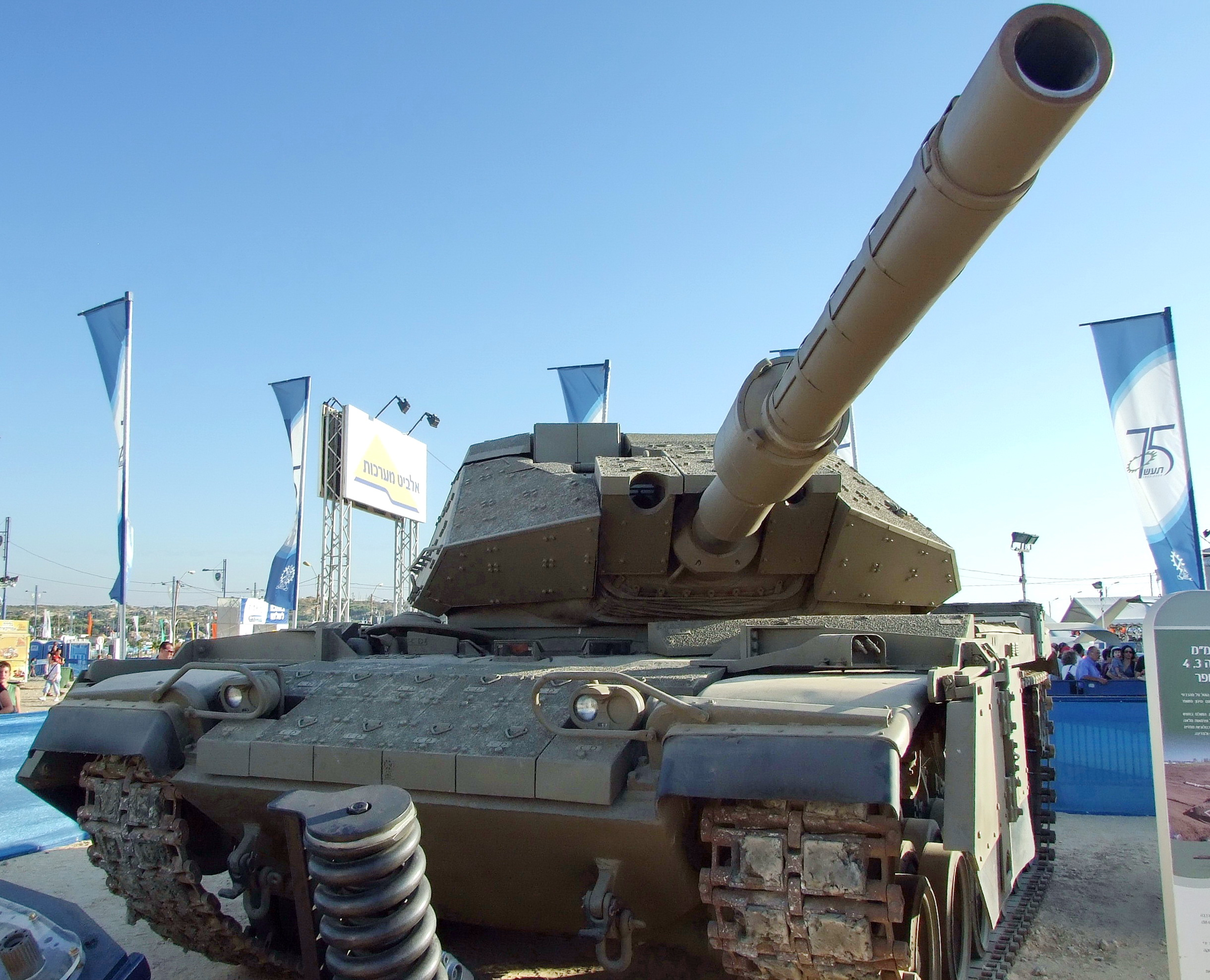
M60T Sabra Mk II armed with the MG253 120 mm smoothbore gun

== Operators ==
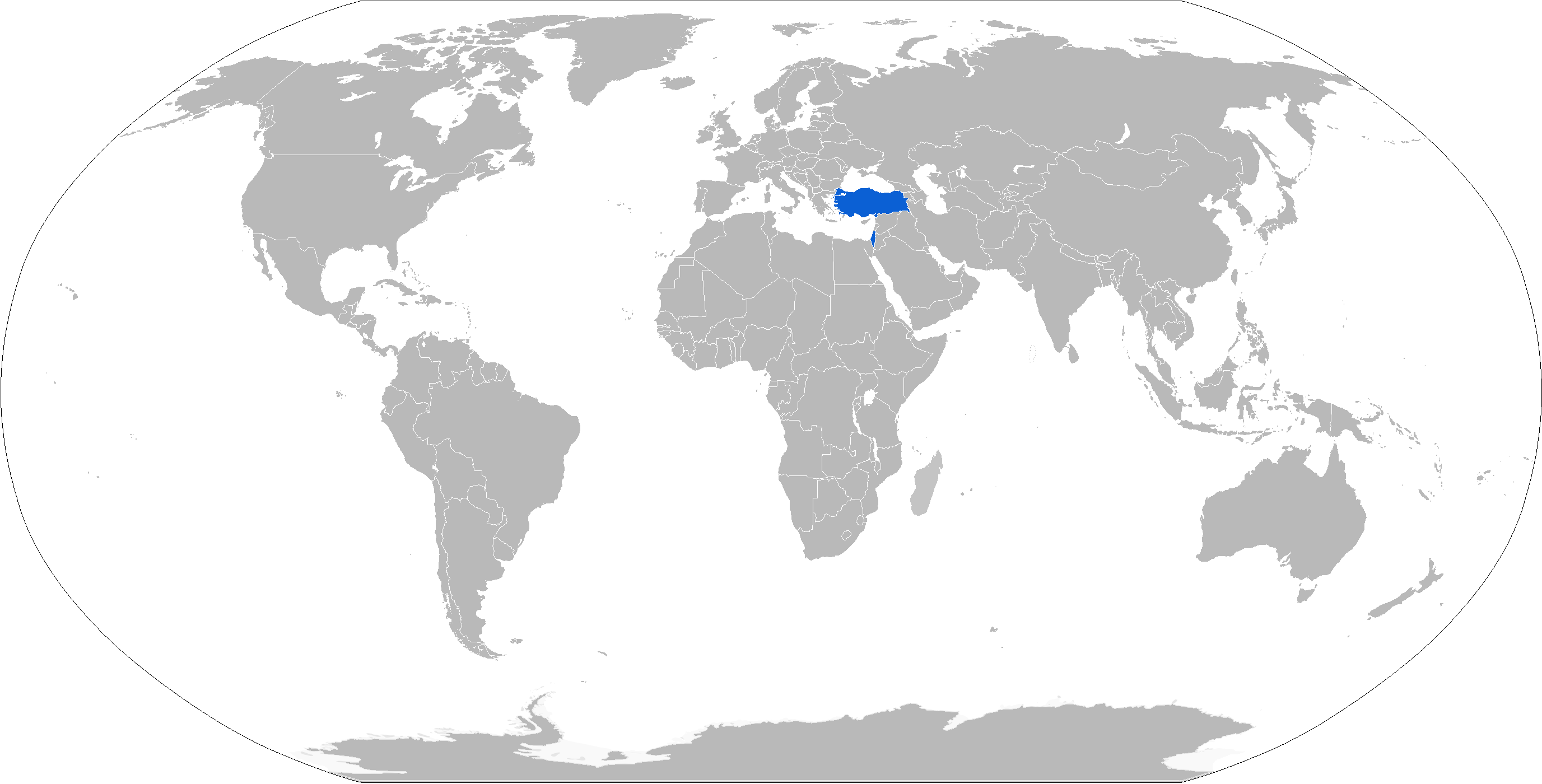
Map with IMI 120mm operators in blue

=== Current operators ===
- MG251:
  - Israel Merkava Mark III
- MG251-LR:
  - Israel Merkava Mark IV
- MG253:
  - Turkey M60T Sabra

== See also ==
Weapons of comparable role, performance and era

- L11A5 120 mm rifled gun: British rifled equivalent, developed by Royal Armament Research and Development Establishment (RARDE) in 1957.
- 2A46 125 mm gun: Russian 125-mm equivalent, developed by Spetstekhnika Design Bureau in 1960s.
- Rheinmetall 120 mm gun: German equivalent, developed by Rheinmetall in 1974.
- CN120-25 120 mm gun: French equivalent, developed by Établissement d'Études et de Fabrication d'Armements de Bourges (EFAB) in 1979.
- EXP-28M1 120 mm rifled tank gun: Experimental British weapon of the late 1970s/early 1980s. Was to have equipped the MBT-80.
- CN120-26 120 mm gun: French equivalent, developed by EFAB in 1980s.
- OTO Breda 120 mm gun: Italian equivalent, developed by OTO Melara in 1988.
- L30A1 120 mm rifled gun: British rifled equivalent, developed by ROF Nottingham in 1989.
- JSW 120 mm gun: Japanese equivalent, developed by Japan Steel Works in 2008.
- CN08 120 mm gun: South Korean equivalent, developed by Agency for Defense Development (ADD) and WIA in 2008.
- 2A82-1M 125 mm gun: New Russian 125-mm equivalent, developed by Uralvagonzavod in 2014.
- MKE 120 mm tank gun: Turkish equivalent, developed by Otokar and Hyundai WIA in 2016.
