= Royal Ordnance L11 =

L11A5
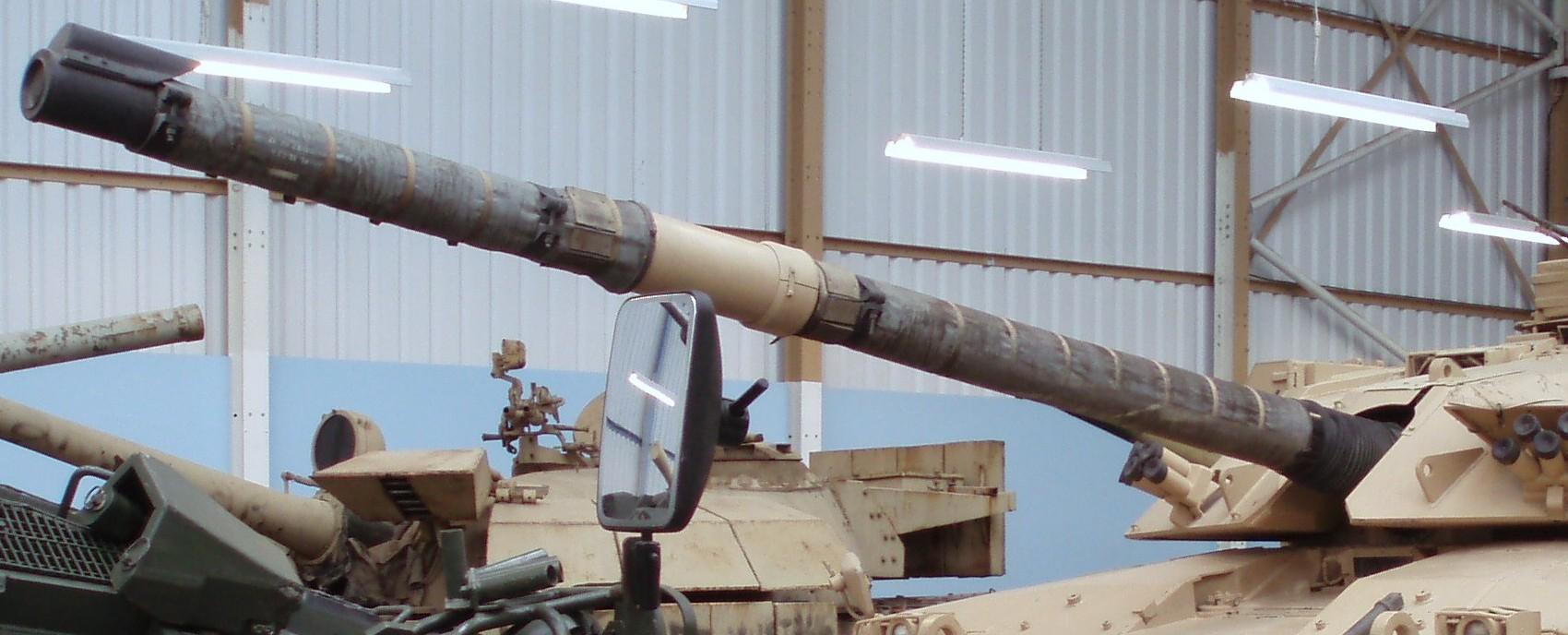
- Gun on Challenger 1 tank at Bovington Tank Museum, UK, 2010
- Place of origin: United Kingdom

Service history
- In service: 1966–present
- Used by: UK; Iran; Jordan; Oman

Production history
- Designer: Royal Armament Research and Development Establishment
- Designed: 1957
- Manufacturer: Royal Ordnance Factories
- Unit cost: $227,000 (1990)
- No. built: 3,012
- Variants: L11A1 to L11A7

Specifications
- Mass: 1,778 kg (3,920 lb)
- Length: 6.858 m (22 ft 6 in)
- Barrel length: 55 calibres (6.6 m)
- Shell: bagged charge
- Calibre: 120 mm (4.7 in)
- Rate of fire: 6–8 rounds per minute

The Royal Ordnance L11A5, officially designated Gun, 120 mm, Tank L11, (Note: sometimes abbreviated "Tk") is a 120 mm L/55 rifled tank gun design. It was the second 120 mm calibre tank gun in service with British Army, the first of which was the Royal Ordnance OQF 120mm Tank L1. It was the first of NATO's 120 mm main battle tank guns which became the standard calibre for Western tanks in the later period of the Cold War. A total of 3,012 of the L11 guns were produced by 2005. The list price was US$227,000 in 1990.

The L11 was developed by Britain's Royal Ordnance Factories to equip the Chieftain tank as the successor to the 105 mm L7 gun used in the Centurion tank and the heavy Caernarvon tank. It was also used on the Challenger 1, which replaced the Chieftain in British and Jordanian service. The weapon has been superseded by the L30 series 120 mm rifled tank gun.

== History ==
The Royal Armament Research and Development Establishment at Fort Halstead designed a new 120 mm rifled tank gun in 1957. The new gun was deemed to be necessary because the British Army specified engagement ranges greater than those of other armies, for example 2,000 m (2,200 yd), as specified by the US Army, despite studies at the time that suggested engagement ranges were below those of the US Army requirements in the great majority of cases. The L11 was specifically designed to fit into the turret mountings of the Chieftain tank (FV4201). After firing trials in 1961, the L11 was accepted for service on the Chieftain in 1965 and entered service with the British Army in 1966.

The adoption of a rifled tank gun on the Challenger led to some controversy, and some experts later urged the British Army to retrofit the turret to fit the smoothbore Rheinmetall Rh-120 adopted by the German Leopard 2 and American M1A1 Abrams. This would allow the British to fire 120 mm APFSDS rounds, which were then in use by the Germans and Americans. The British Army argued that modifying the turret would be impractical and that a smoothbore gun could not fire HESH rounds. Polish-British tank historian Richard Ogorkiewicz argued that the later concern was unwarranted. In the mid 1980s the British Army adopted an "operational emergency" APFSDS round.

During Operation Granby an L11 on a British Army Challenger 1 scored the longest tank-to-tank "kill" in military history, when it destroyed an Iraqi T-55 at a range of 4.7 km (2.9 miles) with an L23 "Fin" round.

Since its introduction, the L11 has evolved into eight production versions. In June 1976, development of new ammunition for the L11A5 was begun.

== Production models ==
The Royal Ordnance basic L11 design was developed into a series of improved production models; the L11A5 was the major production version.

- L11A1 – The initial production variant; 130 were produced.
- L11A2 – RO Defence incorporated numerous minor changes, including a modified vent tube, an obturator sleeve protector, and a 15-hole vent tube magazine. Stronger material was used in fabricating the breech ring.
- L11A3 – This incorporated minor changes to the breech ring.
- L11A4 – Evaluation test prototype for an automatic loading system.
- L11A5 – This was the main production model. It introduced the integral Muzzle Reference System (MRS) and a smaller and lighter fume extractor which required the addition of 7.7 kilograms (17 lb) of weight at the breech for balance.
- L11A6 – This was a conversion of the A3 to accommodate the Muzzle Reference System and fume extractor of the A5.
- L11A7 – A semi-automatic plunger was proposed for the vent tube loader, but did not enter production.
- L30 (EXP 32M1) – A further development of the L11 design, developed under the Challenger Armament program (CHARM).

== Design ==
The breech mechanism is a downward sliding semi-automatic breechblock. The gun was equipped with a hydro-pneumatic recoil system using two buffers. The gun recoils 37 cm (15 in) in most applications. This breechblock design was based on the breechblock on the Krupp/Skoda sFH 18/43 model 18 that the British studied extensively after the Second World War and perfected for use in the 120 mm gun.

Unlike most Western tank weapons which fire a single fixed round, the projectile and propellant are loaded separately. And unlike the Soviet 125-mm 2A46, the propellant is in the form of a combustible bagged charge (or later, a combustible charge case for armour-piercing rounds). This required the obturation to be provided by rings in the breech rather than the cartridge case, as in fixed rounds and 125 mm separate-loaded ones.

When first introduced, APDS (armour-piercing discarding sabot) rounds were fired using a cylindrical charge. High explosive squash head (HESH), smoke and other rounds used a hemi-cylindrical (i.e. a cylinder sliced in two lengthways) charge (the L3). Two HE charges could therefore be stowed in the same space as one AP charge. In the Chieftain and Challenger tanks, the charges were stored in 36 recesses surrounded by water jackets, so that a hit which penetrated the fighting compartment would rupture the jacket and drench the propellant, preventing a catastrophic ammunition fire (known colloquially as a "brew-up").

The barrel of the L11A5 is fitted with a bore evacuator approximately two-thirds of the way to the muzzle and a thermal sleeve.

When first introduced, a 12.7 mm (.50 in) calibre ranging gun was fitted over the barrel of the L11. The projectiles for this ballistically matched those for HESH rounds fired from the main armament out to 2,600 m (2,800 yd), at which point the tracer element burned out. Starting in 1971 a Barr & Stroud LF2 "Tank Laser Sight" (TLS) laser rangefinder replaced the ranging MG in British service, and in conjunction with the "Muzzle Reference System" (MRF) (Note: The Muzzle Reference System uses a laser beam reflected from a mirror at the muzzle to measure minute dimensional changes in the barrel due to temperature, humidity, etc., which are then compensated for in the Fire Control System. The thermal sleeve had originally been developed to minimise such dimensional changes in the barrel which have an increasing effect on gun accuracy as ranges are increased.) added in 1975, allowed engagements at ranges out to 5,000 meters. Further improvement in gunnery performance came with the adoption of the Marconi "Improved Fire Control System" (IFCS) fitted to the Chieftain in 1979. (Note: Testing at the US Army Aberdeen Proving Ground concluded that engaging targets beyond 3 km (1.9 mi) is not practical due to round deviation. This is especially true against targets that are moving. However see note about 5.1km "kill" in Operation Granby.)

== Specification ==
- Calibre: 120 millimetres (4.7 in)
- Barrel length: 6.604 metres (21 ft 8.0 in) (55 calibres, i.e., 55 times 120 millimetres)
- Length overall: 6.858 metres (22 ft 6.0 in)
- Weight: 1,778 kilograms (3,920 lb)
- Recoil distance: 37 centimetres (1 ft 3 in)
- Maximum proof pressure: 482.3 megapascals (69,950 psi)
- Maximum design pressure: 497.7 megapascals (72,190 psi)
- Maximum range/velocity (APDS): 3,000 metres (3,300 yd), 4,495 ft/s (1,370 m/s)
- Maximum range/velocity (HESH): 8,000 metres (8,700 yd), 2,198 ft/s (670 m/s)
- Maximum rate of fire: 8 rounds/min
- Sustained rate of fire: 6 rounds/min
- Elevation: +20/−10 on Chieftain Mk 2

== Ammunition ==
=== Service ammunition ===
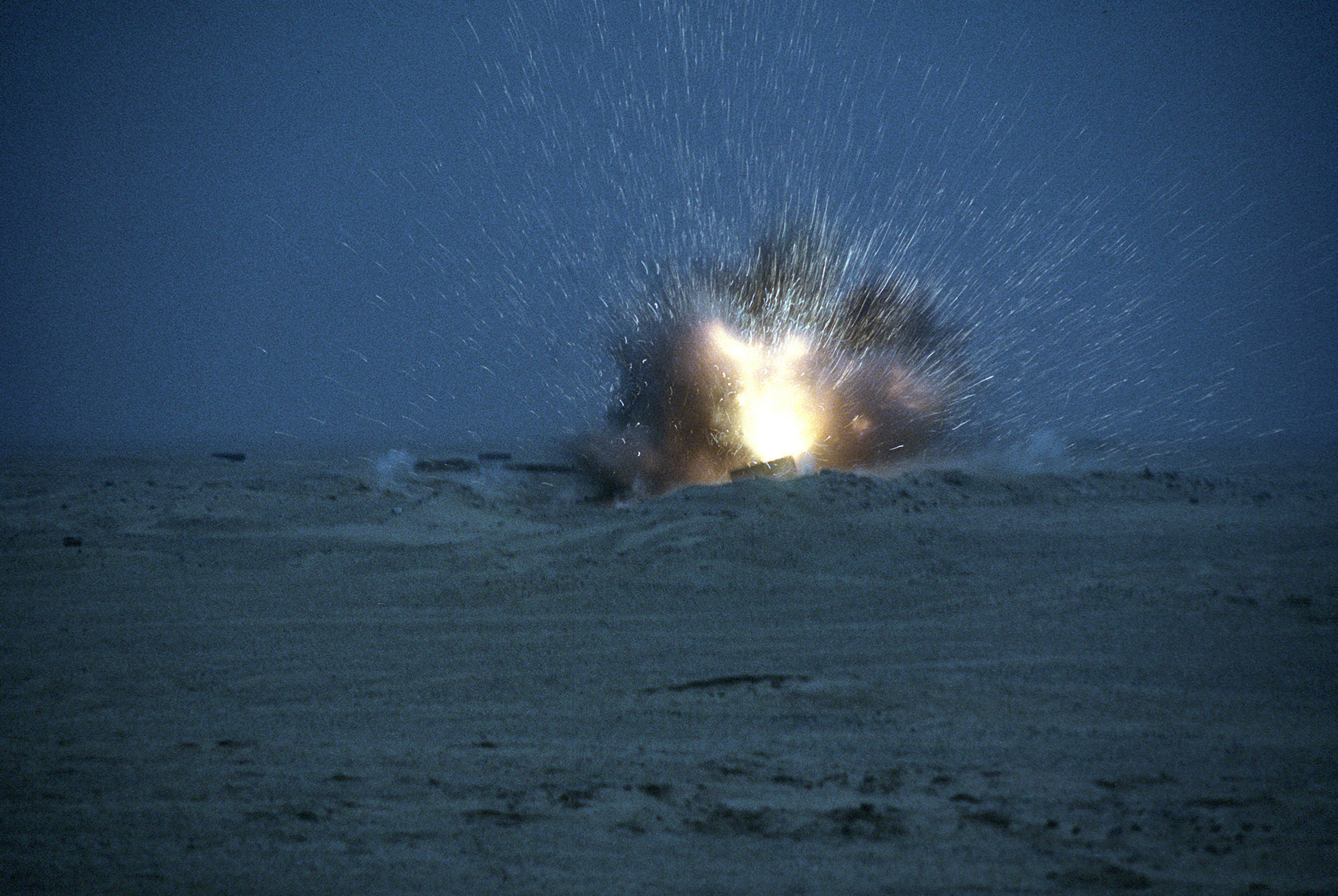
Iraqi tank exploding after being hit with a projectile fired from L11 gun

- L15A5 APDS-T: The L15A5 armour-piercing discarding sabot uses a dense tungsten-alloy core held within a steel and light-alloy subprojectile, which is itself carried in a light-alloy sabot, the entire projectile assembly weighing 10.4 kg, reduced to 7.5 kg without the sabot. The subprojectile carries a tracer element carried in a short housing at the rear that also serves as a locking point between the subprojectile and sabot before the round is fired. The projectile assembly is fired using the L4 CCC charge, which contains 8.4 kg of NQ/S53-12 propellant. The muzzle velocity is 1,370 m/s. The L15A3 is capable of defeating both NATO Single Heavy Target (150 mm RHA at 60°), the Triple Heavy Target (triple array equivalent to 115 mm RHA at 60°) at 1000 yards (914 m) or 355 mm at 0° obliquity at 1000 m.
- L23A1 APFSDS: An APFSDS subprojectile with a 6 bladed aluminium fin located in a 3 segment aluminium alloy saddle type sabot. It is capable of defeating the NATO Single Heavy Target (150mm RHA at 60°) at 6350 m and the NATO Triple Heavy Target (triple array equivalent to 110mm RHA at 65°) at 6300 m. The L23A1 weighs 7.89 kg and features a 3.89 kg subprojectile containing a 3.69 kg Tungsten-Nickel-Copper (W.Ni.Cu) alloy monobloc penetrator with a L/D ratio of 14:1. The shot 120 mm TK APFSDS, L23 is used with the L8A1 CCC charge. Designated Jericho 2 when fired with modified L14 CCC. The L23A1 is still in service in the Royal Army of Oman.
- L26A1 APFSDS: It was developed under the CHARM 1 (CHallenger ARMament 1) programme and can be fired from both the L11 and the L30 gun. The complete projectile weighs 8.5 kg and it has a 4.63 kg depleted uranium U¾Ti alloy long rod penetrator surrounded by an aluminium alloy sabot. The L26A1 shot and the less-volatile L14 bag charge combination is known as the JERICHO round (Jericho 1 with the L8 charge and Jericho 2 with the L14 charge). The Jericho 1 combination was about 15% better in penetration terms than the L23A1 and closer to 25% when fired from the L30A1 gun with the L14 charge.
- L31A7 HESH: This is employed as a general purpose high explosive round, though it also has a good anti-armour performance, and is effective against fortifications and structures. It can cause the spalling of lethal metal scabs behind a 150 mm-thick plate sloped at 60° at 1000 yards. The L31A7 round is fired using the L3 bag charge. Muzzle velocity is 670 metres per second (2,200 ft/s).
- L32A6 SH/Prac: A training projectile, which matches the trajectory of the L31 HESH. It is available as a completely inert form, or can be filled with an inert HE substitute (a composition of calcium sulphate and castor oil) or an inert HE substitute plus a live fuze and a flash pellet for spotting purposes. It is fired with the L3A2 bag charge.
- L34A2 Smoke/WP: Matches the L31 HESH in ballistic performance. It is the same shape, though it is supplied in a different colour to prevent confusion.
- L20A1 DS/T Prac: This is a relatively low-cost training discarding sabot projectile with the subprojectile made from steel with a light alloy nose. It is lighter, but matches the L23 trajectory to 2,000 metres (6,600 ft). Its use also extends barrel life.

=== Prototypes ammunition ===
- L35A1 Anti-Personnel: A canister shot fired using the L3 bag charge, it discharged pellets lethal against unprotected personnel up to a range of 200 m from the gun muzzle. It was not placed in production.
- PISH: The Product-Improved Squashed Head was an improved 120 mm HESH round developed by the RARDE. Unveiled in 1976, it featured a ballistic cap and a new CCC charge.
- HEAT: A finned shaped-charge shell, developed by the RARDE, it was unveiled in 1976.
- Illuminating shell: an illuminating round fitted with an airburst time fuze, developed by the RARDE, it was unveiled in 1976.
- Product-Improved Smoke WP: a product improved smoke round with a new CCC charge. Developed by the RARDE, it was unveiled in 1976.
- BD26: Private venture development by Royal Ordnance plc. as an interim solution to the forecoming L26A1 CHARM 1. It featured a 4.08 kg monobloc penetrator with a L/D ratio of 18.6:1. This penetrator is made of Tungsten-Nickel-Iron penetrator (W.Ni.Fe) TF49P alloy which in terms of toughness and ductility is at least twice as tough as the standard Tungsten-Nickel-Copper alloy. The capabilities of the BD26 were presented to MOD on 14 Nov 1986, the BD26 provides the round with approx. 15% increase in penetration performance compared to the L23A1 when fired from the L11 gun with the L8 charge and approx. 25% when fired from L30A1 with the high pressure charge. The BD26 was never adopted by the British Army.
- L28A1 APFSDS: This was essentially a L27A1 projectile with the depleted uranium alloy penetrator replaced by a Tungsten-Nickel-Iron (W.Ni.Fe) alloy penetrator manufactured by BAE. The APFSDS L28A1 was developed specifically for Challenger 2 L30A1 tank guns but could be fired from the earlier Challenger 1 L11 gun following FCS modifications, use of a less powerful propellant charge and modification to the ammunition stowage to accommodate the longer projectile.
- L28A2 / L23A2 APFSDS: In November 2006 the UK Ministry of Defence announced that it was considering a programme to develop a 4th generation tungsten APFSDS under the designation L28A2. The contract would be issued to BAE Systems, Global Combat Systems Munitions and would cover fabrication and test of prototypes up to, but not including, the design chill and qualification phase. They explicitly noted that this was not envisioned as a replacement for the depleted uranium-based L27 APFSDS used by the Challenger 2. The designation was therefore changed to L23A2 as it is seen more as a replacement for the first generation APFSDS L23A1 shot. British-funded firing trials to demonstrate terminal ballistics have been carried out. British qualification had been scheduled for 2009, but was held back to 2010, after which production for Oman began. The L23A2 features the lighter projectile weight (7.95 kg) of the L23A1 APFSDS and integrates with the L18A1 propellant charge of the L29A1 CHARM 3 Training Round (C3TR). The use of the C3TR propellant extends barrel life but reduces muzzle velocity. Due to improved penetrator design, external and terminal ballistics are still better than the L23A1. British qualification had been scheduled for 2010 and production for Oman was supposed to start just after. The L23A2 is backwards-compatible with the older L11A5 gun used by the Royal Jordanian Army Al-Hussein main battle tanks (phased out in 2018).

== Operators ==
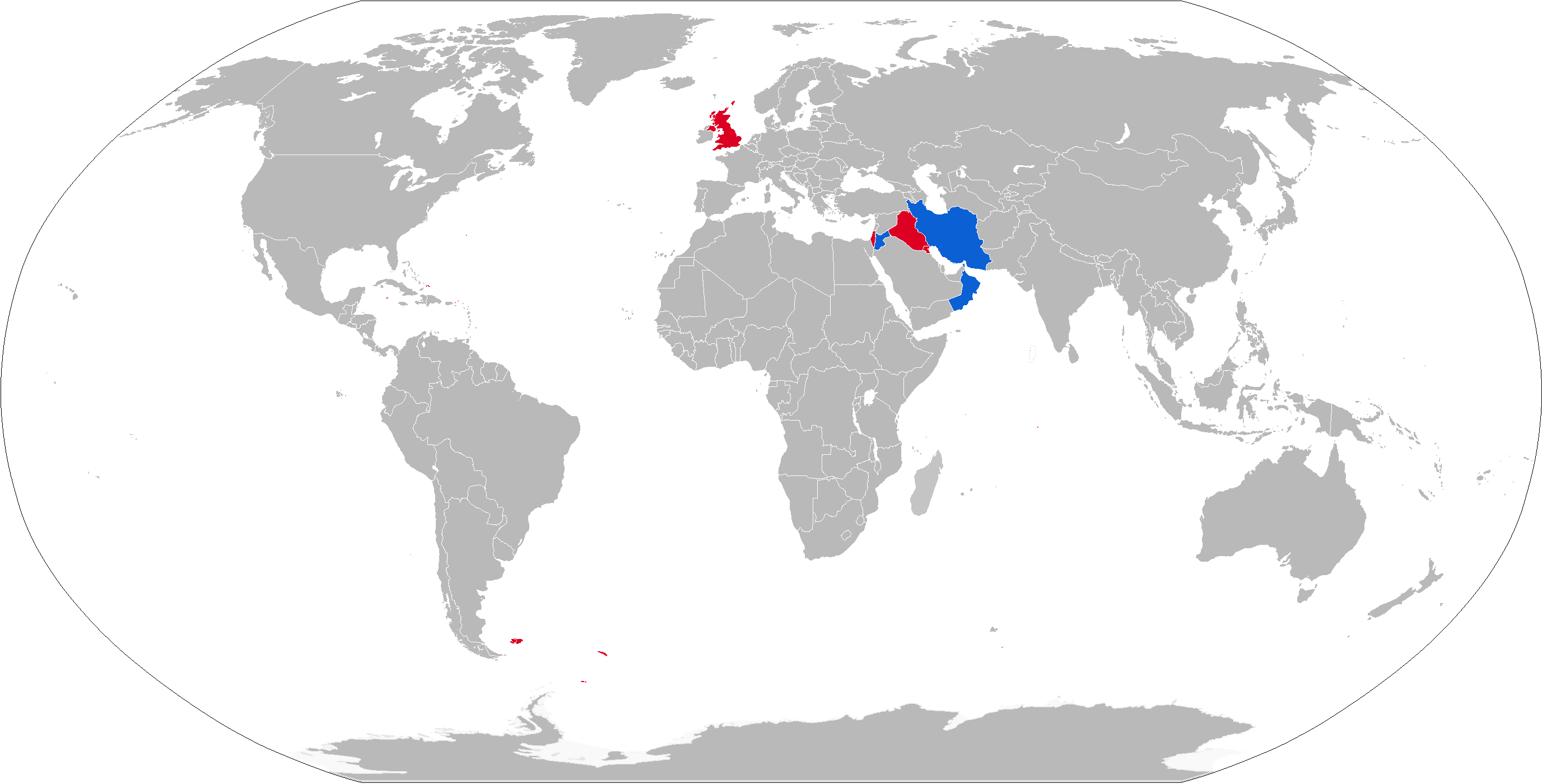
Map with L11A5 operators in blue with former operators in red

=== Current operators ===
- Iran
- Jordan
- Oman

=== Former operators ===
- Iraq
- Kuwait
- United Kingdom

== See also ==
- L30A1 120 mm rifled gun: Successor of L11, developed by ROF Nottingham in 1989.

=== Weapons of comparable role, performance and era ===
- 2A46 125 mm gun: Russian 125-mm equivalent, developed by Spetstekhnika Design Bureau in 1960s.
- Rheinmetall 120 mm gun: German equivalent, developed by Rheinmetall in 1974.
- CN120-25 120 mm gun: French equivalent, developed by Établissement d'Études et de Fabrication d'Armements de Bourges (EFAB) in 1979.
- EXP-28M1 120 mm rifled tank gun: Experimental British weapon of the late 1970s/early 1980s. Was to have equipped the MBT-80.
- CN120-26 120 mm gun: French equivalent, developed by EFAB in 1980s.
- IMI 120 mm gun: Israeli equivalent, developed by Israeli Military Industries in 1988.
- OTO Breda 120 mm gun: Italian equivalent, developed by OTO Melara in 1988.
- JSW 120 mm gun: Japanese equivalent, developed by Japan Steel Works in 2008.
- CN08 120 mm gun: South Korean equivalent, developed by Agency for Defense Development (ADD) and WIA in 2008.
- 2A82-1M 125 mm gun: Russian 125-mm equivalent, developed by Uralvagonzavod in 2014.
- MKE 120 mm tank gun: Turkish equivalent, developed by Otokar and Hyundai WIA in 2016.
