= Royal Ordnance L30 =

British main battle tank gun

L30A1
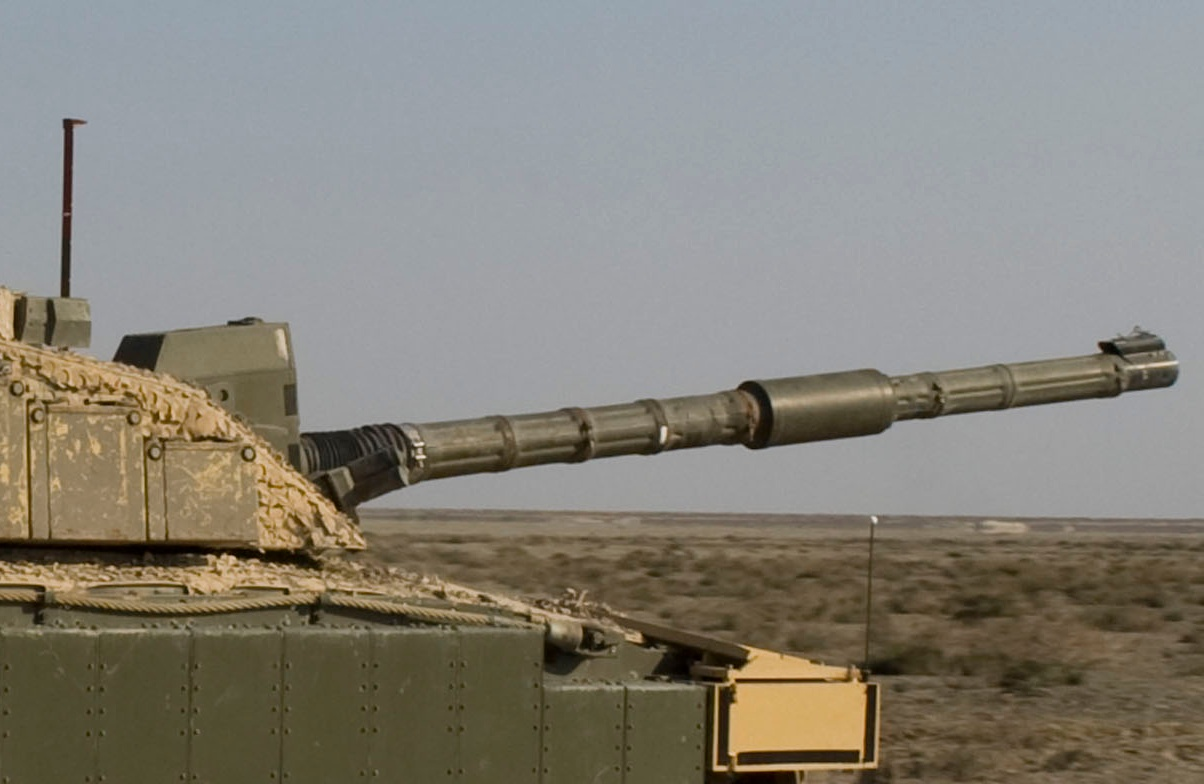
- L30A1 gun mounted in the turret of a Challenger 2 tank
- Place of origin: United Kingdom

Service history
- In service: 1998–present
- Used by: British Army; Royal Army of Oman; Ukrainian Ground Forces
- Wars: Iraq War; Russian Invasion of Ukraine

Production history
- Designer: Royal Ordnance Factory, Nottingham
- Designed: 1989
- Manufacturer: Royal Ordnance Factory

Specifications
- Mass: 1,805 kg (3,979 lb) (barrel with thermal sleeve)
- Barrel length: 55 calibres (6.6 m (22 ft))
- Calibre: 120 mm (4.7 in)
- Muzzle velocity: L27A1 APFSDS: 1,650 m/s (5,400 ft/s); L31A7 HESH: 670 m/s (2,200 ft/s)

The L30A1, officially designated Gun, 120 mm, Tank L30, is a British-designed 120 mm rifled tank gun, installed in the turrets of Challenger 2 main battle tanks. It is an improved production model of the Royal Ordnance L11 series of rifled tank guns. Challenger 2 tanks and their L30A1 guns are operated by the British and Omani armies. In 2023, L30A1 armed Challenger 2 tanks supplied by the British were delivered to Ukraine.

== History ==
The L30A1 was conceived in the late 1980s as part of the Challenger Armament (CHARM) project for the Challenger 2 tank, then in development by Vickers. Its design developed on the pre-existing Royal Ordnance L11A5 that had armed the Challenger 1 and Chieftain. CHARM was intended to develop a new main armament for the Challenger 2 tank that could also be retro-fitted to the Challenger 1. The project had three components: the gun (prototype known as EXP32M1), developed by the Royal Ordnance Factory, Nottingham, a new depleted uranium (DU) APFSDS round, and a propellant charge for it. CHARM superseded other projects, the EXP 32M1 experimental gun was re-titled the XL30E4 and accepted for production as the L30 in 1989.

In the event, the L30 was not used to upgun Challenger 1 tanks, which were withdrawn from British service and sold to Jordan.

The first of 386 Challenger 2 tanks were delivered for British service in 1994, with the tank certified for operation in 1998. Deliveries were completed in 2002.

Oman ordered 38 Challenger 2 tanks, in two batches in 1994 and 1997, and these were delivered armed with L30 guns.

In January 2023, the UK government announced that it was donating L30-armed Challenger 2 tanks to Ukraine, with the first deliveries made at the end of March 2023.

== Design ==
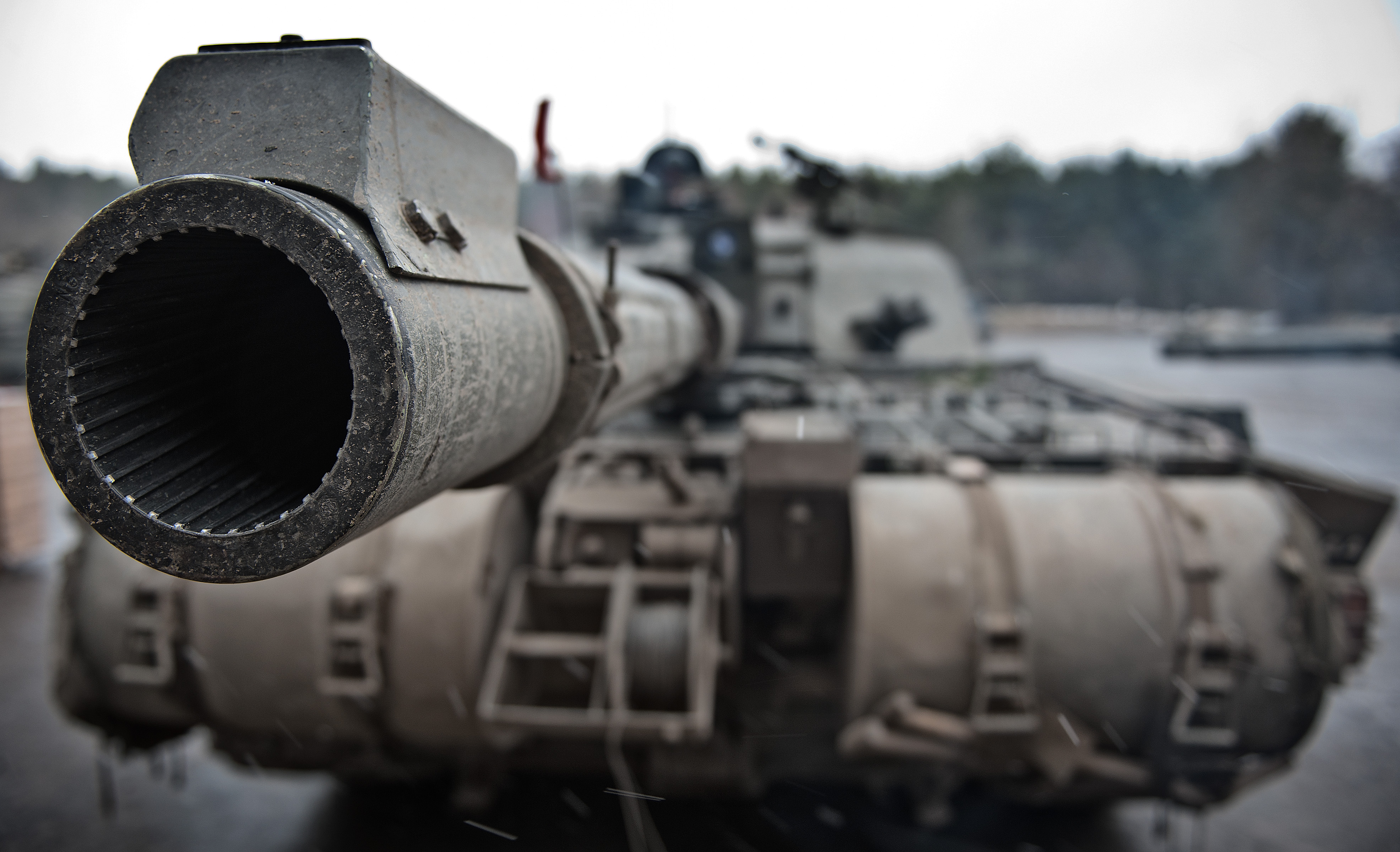
Close-up of muzzle

The barrel is 55 calibres long (L55), i.e., 55 times 120 millimetres, or 6.6 metres (21 ft 8 in). It is made of electro-slag refined steel. The bore and chamber are electro-plated with chromium to give a barrel life of 500 effective full charges.

The gun has a split sliding-block breech mechanism. One vertically sliding block holds a Crossley-type elastomeric obturation ring (which is necessary because the propellant charges are combustible cases or bags) and is locked for firing by a second block. When the second block falls, the first is released to open the breech.

Uniquely among modern main battle tank guns, and like the L11 gun that preceded it, the L30 has a rifled barrel. This permits High Explosive Squash Head (HESH) rounds to be fired. HESH ammunition is used both as a general-purpose high explosive projectile, and also against other tanks and armoured vehicles. When HESH ammunition is fired from a rifled barrel, the spin imparted to the projectile helps ensure a predictable distribution of the plasticised explosive filler, and thus maximises its efficiency in the anti-tank role.

== Ammunition ==
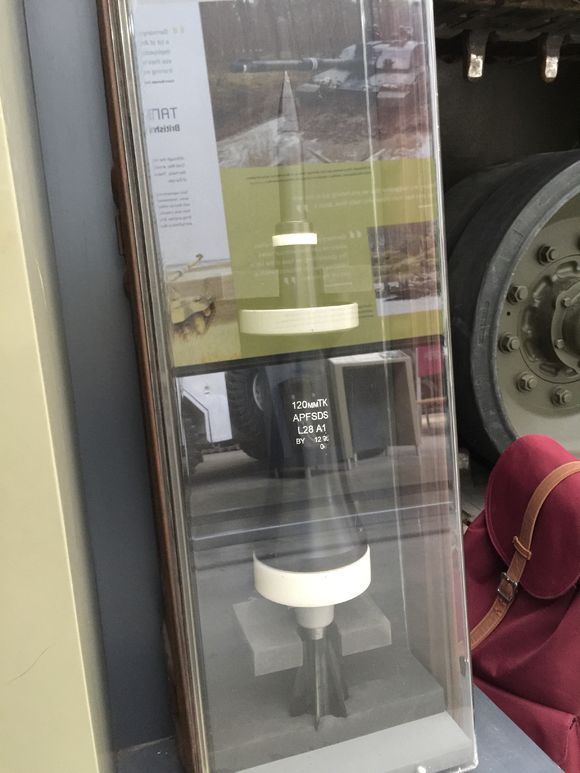
A L28A1 APFSDS preserved in the Bovington Tank Museum, 2018

The L30 is also unique among modern tank guns in its dependency on two-part ammunition, composed of a projectile, and a propellant charge. These are stored and loaded separately.

The ammunition types which are currently or were formerly in use include:

=== Projectiles ===
- L23A1 APFSDS: The penetrator is made from a tungsten–nickel–copper alloy with a 6 bladed aluminium fin and is located in a three-segment aluminium alloy saddle-type sabot. The shot 120mm TK APFSDS, L23 is used with the L8A1 charge. The L23A1 is capable of defeating the NATO Single Heavy Target (150 mm (5.9 in) RHA at 60°) at 6,350 m (20,830 ft) and the NATO Triple Heavy Target (triple array equivalent to 110 mm (4.3 in) RHA at 65°) at 6,300 m (20,700 ft). In 2010, BAE Munitions undertook a feasibility study to model the ballistic/energetic effect of the L23A1 APFSDS and the L18A1 CCC charge combination. Function and consistency tests were completed in September 2012 with armour plate firing completed in December 2012 and strength of propelling charge tests completed in February 2013 at the Lulworth ranges. The Challenger 2 live crew clearance firing tests were completed in May 2013. The Royal Army of Oman expected the L18A1 charge to be certified for operation with their Challenger 2's 120 mm L23A1 ammunition in August 2013 with deliveries taking place by mid-2014.
- L23A2 APFSDS: Considered as a replacement for the L23A1 shot. British qualification had been scheduled for 2010 and production for Oman was supposed to start just after. The L23A2 is backwards-compatible with the older L11A5 gun used by the Royal Jordanian Army Al-Hussein main battle tanks (phased out in 2018).
- L26A1 APFSDS: It was developed under the CHARM 1 (CHallenger ARMament 1) programme and can be fired from both the L11 gun and the L30 gun. It has a depleted uranium long rod penetrator surrounded by an aluminium alloy sabot. The L26A1 shot and the less-volatile L14 bag charge combination is known as the JERICHO round (Jericho 1 with the L8 charge and Jericho 2 with the L14 charge). The Jericho 1 combination was about 15% better in penetration terms than the L23A1 and closer to 25% when fired from the L30A1 gun with the L14 charge.
- L27A1 APFSDS: Also known as CHARM 3 (CHallenger ARMament 3), it features a longer penetrator made of depleted uranium to defeat complex armour arrays and advanced forms of ERA. The 120 mm Tk APFSDS CHARM 3 uses the safer L16A1 CCC (Combustible Cartridge Case) charge and is designated CHARM 3A1 when using the L17 bag charge. The L27 entered in service in 1999. Muzzle velocity is 1,650 m/s (5,400 ft/s)
- L28A1 APFSDS: A private development initiated in the late 1990s, Royal Ordnance Defence began the development of a new tungsten alloy long-rod penetrator APFSDS-T round (the L28) to enhance the appeal of the Challenger 2 tank on the export market. By late 2001, the British Army had begun procuring the L28 round.
- L28A2 APFSDS: A newer export 120 mm APFSDS projectile designated L28A2. The UK Ministry of Defence funded the L28A2 work specifically for Oman, which wanted to replace its old L23A1 APFSDS. The work on the L28A2 round also included some of the technology incorporated into the CHARM 3 (C3TR) propelling charge system already in service with the British Army. This used a British low-pressure charge system and advanced penetrator material, as used in other in-service rounds. The L28A2 contract was supposed to enable BAE Systems Land Systems to complete the de-risking of the L28A2 in early 2008. Qualification tests and mass production were scheduled for 2009.
- L29A1 DS-T: also known as CHARM 3 Training Round (C3TR), it simulates the APFSDS round but with a much reduced safety range thanks to its conical tail which increase aerodynamic drag. It uses the L18A1 CCC charge. It was brought into service in 2003.
- L31A7 HESH: This is employed as a general purpose high explosive round, though it also has a good anti-armour performance, and is effective against fortifications and structures. The L31 is fired using the L3 bag charge. Muzzle velocity is 670 m/s (2,200 ft/s).
- L32A6 SH/Prac: A training projectile, which matches the trajectory of the L31 HESH. It is available as a completely inert form, or can be filled with an inert HE substitute (a composition of calcium sulphate and castor oil) or an inert HE substitute plus a live fuze and a flash pellet for spotting purposes. It is fired with the L3A2 bag charge.
- L34A2 Smoke/WP: It matches the L31 HESH in appearance and ballistic performance. It is supplied in a different colour to prevent confusion.

=== Propellant charges ===
| Designation | Type | Projectile used | Propellant | Propellant weight | Type | Length | Notes |
|---|---|---|---|---|---|---|---|
| L3 | cloth bag charge | L31 HESH; L32 SH-P; L34 Smoke-WP; APERS | NQ/S27-09 | 3.034 kg (6.69 lb) | bundle of propellant sticks | 658 mm (25.9 in) | |
| L5 CCC | combustible cartridge case | L20A1 DS/T Prac | NQ/S27-09 | 5.16 kg (11.4 lb) | bundle of propellant sticks | | CCC stands for Combustible Cartridge Case |
| L8 | combustible cartridge case | L23A1 APFSDS | AX/S64-20 | 6.65 kg (14.7 lb) | bundle of propellant sticks | 709 mm (27.9 in) | |
| L14A1 | combustible cartridge case | L26A1 APFSDS | NEQ DX/S | 6.46 kg (14.2 lb) | bundle of propellant sticks | | The L14 charge was modified to allow it to be used operationally with L11 guns during Operation Granby. The code word for this project was Jericho. The L14A1 is codenamed Jericho 1, it was designed for hot weather operations |
| L14A2 | combustible cartridge case | L23A1 APFSDS; L26A1 APFSDS | | | bundle of propellant sticks | | hybrid charge using an adapted WNC-supplied L8 combustible case |
| L16A1 CCC | combustible cartridge case | L27A1 APFSDS | Rowanite 304 | 5.428 kg (11.97 lb) (stick) + 3.262 kg (7.19 lb) (granular) | bundle of propellant sticks and grains | | |
| L17A1 | combustible cartridge case | L27A1 APFSDS | Rowanite | 5.427 kg (11.96 lb) (stick) + 3.263 kg (7.19 lb) (granular) | bundle of propellant sticks and grains | | used in extreme hot and dry climatic conditions |
| L18A1 CP DS-T | combustible cartridge case | L29A1 DS-T; L23A1 APFSDS | Rowanite 316 | 6.712 kg (14.80 lb) | bundle of propellant sticks | | CP DS-T stands for Charge Propelling Discarding Sabot-Training |

== Operational service ==
The L30 saw its first offensive use during the Iraq War where Challenger 2s provided fire support for British forces, and destroyed numerous Iraqi tanks.

On 25 March 2003, a friendly fire ("blue-on-blue") incident occurred in Basra in which one Challenger 2 of the Black Watch Battlegroup (2nd Royal Tank Regiment) mistakenly engaged another Challenger 2 of the Queen's Royal Lancers after detecting what was believed to be an enemy flanking manoeuvre on thermal equipment. Two High Explosive Squash Head (HESH) rounds were fired, with the second hitting the open commander's hatch lid of the QRL tank sending hot fragments into the turret, killing two crew members. The hit caused a fire that eventually ignited the stowed ammunition, destroying the tank.

== Accident ==
An accident deemed to have been due largely to a design fault in the L30 gun killed two men and injured two others. On 14 June 2017, a Challenger 2 from The Royal Tank Regiment suffered an ammunition explosion during live firing exercises at the Castlemartin Range in Pembrokeshire. The tank was firing 120 mm practice shells with a standard propellant charge. The explosion critically injured the four-man crew, with two later dying of their wounds in hospital. All British Army tank firing exercises were suspended for 48 hours while the cause of the explosion was investigated. It was determined that a bolt vent axial (BVA) seal assembly had been removed during an earlier exercise and had not been replaced at the time of the incident, allowing explosive gases to enter the turret space, detonating two bag charges that had not been stowed in the internal ammunition bins as required by correct procedure. The lack of a written process for removal and replacement of the seal assembly meant that the crew were unaware of its absence. The coroner at the inquest said that the main cause of the incident was that inadequate consideration had been given during the production of the L30 gun as to whether it could be fired without the seal assembly.

== Operators ==
Map with L30 operators in blue

- United Kingdom
- Oman
- Ukraine

== See also ==
- L11A5 120 mm rifled gun: British rifled equivalent, developed by Royal Armament Research and Development Establishment (RARDE) in 1957.
- EXP-28M1 120 mm rifled gun: Experimental British weapon of the late 1970s/early 1980s. Was to have equipped the MBT-80.

=== Weapons of comparable role, performance and era ===
- 2A46 125 mm gun: Russian 125-mm equivalent, developed by Spetstekhnika Design Bureau in 1960s.
- Rheinmetall 120 mm gun: German equivalent, developed by Rheinmetall in 1974.
- CN120-25 120 mm gun: French equivalent, developed by Établissement d'Études et de Fabrication d'Armements de Bourges (EFAB) in 1979.
- CN120-26 120 mm gun: French equivalent, developed by EFAB in 1980s.
- IMI 120 mm gun: Israeli equivalent, developed by Israeli Military Industries in 1988.
- OTO Breda 120 mm gun: Italian equivalent, developed by OTO Melara in 1988.
- JSW 120 mm gun: Japanese equivalent, developed by Japan Steel Works in 2008.
- CN08 120 mm gun: South Korean equivalent, developed by Agency for Defense Development (ADD) and WIA in 2008.
- 2A82-1M 125 mm gun: New Russian 125-mm equivalent, developed by Uralvagonzavod in 2014.
- MKE 120 mm tank gun: Turkish equivalent, developed by Otokar and Hyundai WIA in 2016.
