= Muzzle reference system =

Device used in tank guns

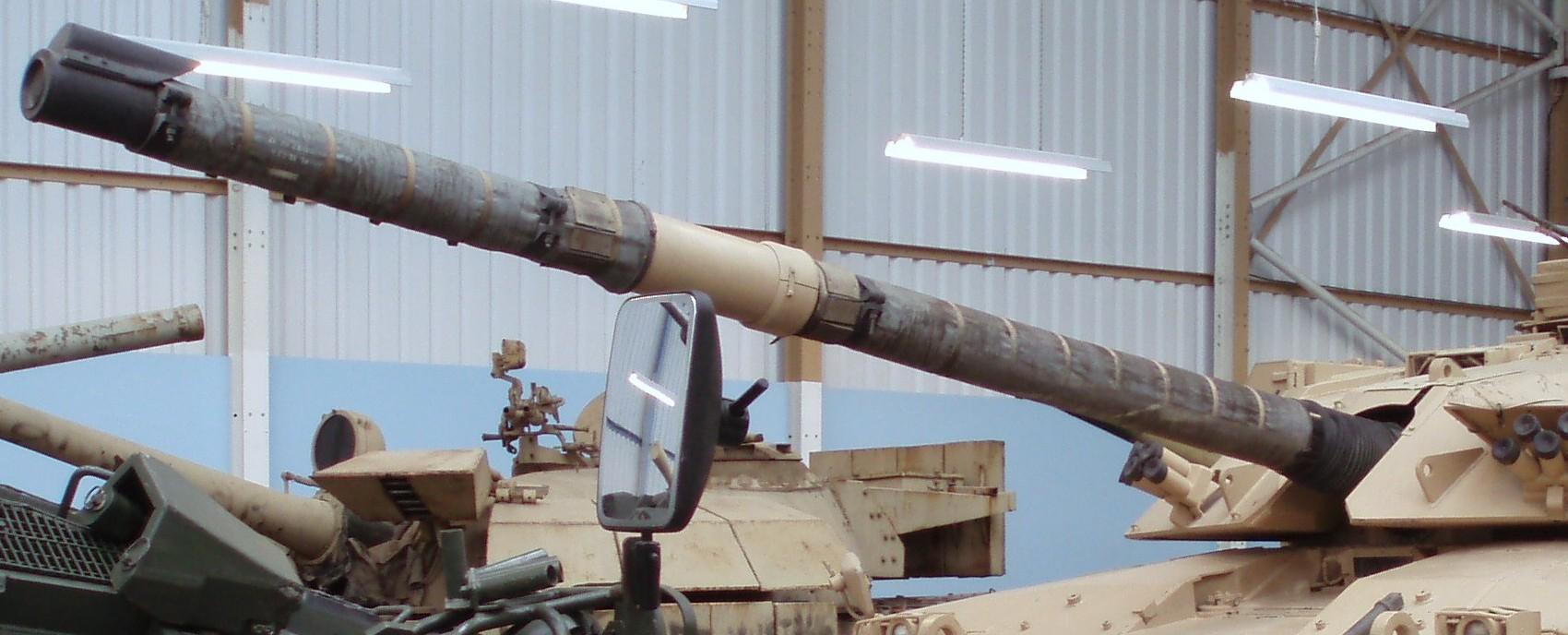
The mirror for the muzzle reference system on this Royal Ordnance L11 is inside the metal housing on top of the thermal sleeve.

A muzzle reference system (MRS) is a device used on most modern tank guns and some artillery systems that measures the bending of the barrel due to heat, gravity and other issues. It normally consists of a laser device and detector mounted at the breach end of the gun, often co-located with other optics like the gunner's sight, and a mirror at the muzzle. By measuring the deflection of the barrel, corrections can be applied by the ballistic computer to correct for changes as the gun is fired.

== See also ==
- Thermal sleeve
