= ROF Nottingham =

UK World War II Royal Ordnance Factory

Royal Ordnance Factory (ROF) Nottingham opened in 1936 in The Meadows, Nottingham, United Kingdom. It was one of a number of Royal Ordnance Factories created in the build up to World War II. During the war the site employed up to four thousand workers. The factory was closed in 2001.

The site that had been used for manufacturing, mainly of arms, since 1916.

== Early site history and production: World War I ==
Royal Ordnance Factories were the successors to the manufacturing departments of the Ordnance Office.

=== Site history ===
NPF Nottingham female worker

=== 1915 ===
- 15 July: Cammell Laird & Co Ltd were asked to build and manage a National Projectile Factory.
- 23 July: The above firm produced a scheme and preliminary estimates for a factory to produce 2,000 9.2" and 6,000 6" shells per week.
- 19 August: First sod cut.

=== 1916 ===
- 27 May: First 6" shell completed
- 31 May: First 9.2" shell completed
- 15 July: 9.2" shell production had reached its design output capacity of 2000 units per week
- 19 August: End of first year in operation. 23,519 off 6" shell and 17,842 off 9.2" shell produced
- 23 September: 6" shell production had reached its design output capacity of 6000 units per week.

=== 1917 ===
- March: 9.2" shell output reaching 5000 per week.
- 20 June: Repair plant for 18 pounder guns completed, and an announcement that 6" Mk XIX guns to be produced
- 18 August: Ten repaired 18 pounder guns completed
- 1 October: The factory name changed to the National Ordnance factory
- 20 October: Output of 6" shell reached peak at 13,500 per week.
- 29 October: Last 9.2" shell delivered. Total output 210,262.
- 4 December: First four new build 18 pounder guns completed

=== 1918 ===
- May: First pair of tubes for the 6" gun produceden
- 11 July: Last 6" shell produced. Total output 685,801.
- 21 September: First 6" gun finished and dispatched.
- November: Competed gun output 11 per week

=== 1919 ===
- Cammell Laird & Co Ltd still occupied the site under the name of National Ordnance Factory.

=== 1920 ===
- Works Manager, National Ordnance Factory, Benjamin Hick received an OBE, Ministry of Munitions.

=== 1923 ===
- The site bought outright by Cammell Laird & Co Ltd. The company built railway wagons through the 1920s. Some of the site used to house Nottingham Corporation buses at the time of changeover to trolley buses.

=== 1930 ===
- The factory was conveyed to the Metropolitan Cammell Carriage, Wagon and Finance Company.

=== 1935 ===
- The above company had gone into liquidation, the new owners becoming the Metro Cammell Carriage and Wagon Company Ltd.

== World War II ==
=== Conversion to an Engineering ROF ===
In the late 1930s, war was seen as a possibility, if not likely, and a sizeable rearmament programme began, probably also activated by the concern that a large proportion of the arsenal was becoming obsolete.

The factory was bought back by the War Office in September 1936, the conveyance (dated 7 May) detailing a sum of £94,475 for the purchase. It was Royal Ordnance Factory Number 23.

Considerable effort was expended in turning the ROF Nottingham into a modern gun factory. The first machine tools were installed in January 1937 and an article in 'Machinery' magazine of 19 January 1939 describes the last machine tools as installed 'a few weeks ago'

Some idea of the scale of the endeavour can be gauged by Nottingham being listed in the ROF accounts for year ending 31 March 1938 as 'under construction'. As of that date, the amount spent on construction and equipment at Nottingham was £1,725,203 (considerably more than the purchase price). A new production facility (the South Shop) was being built at about this time, and roughly 300 people were employed on the reconstruction in 1937. The payroll level had grown to 2,272 people at the end of March 1938, and 3,796 a year later, shortly after the aforementioned 'Machinery' article had described the factory as 'working to capacity'.

World War II was if anything much busier than World War I had been, with the peak employment being said to number 14,000 (a large proportion being women) on two shifts of twelve hours each.

Until the remodelling of the Meadows area around 1975, ROF Nottingham was much less conspicuous than it became (as least from ground level), being situated at the end of a series of Coronation Street type roads full of terraced houses. Apart from Kings Meadow Road, there were parallel streets to the north called Middle Furlong Road, Rupert Street and Newcastle Street, which extended over what became the North Car Park, so that the end houses were very close to the end of main manufacturing unit – North Shop (a gate by the Paint Shop was also in use). It was decided therefore, as a camouflage measure, to paint a series of stripes running east–west across the North Shop roof, in tune with the roads, so that the factory resembled a continuation of the houses when viewed from the air. There appear to be no traces now of this measure, and just how effective it was is uncertain, but it represents one example of the extent to which such matters were taken seriously.

=== World War II production ===
Nottingham had two main production lines during the war; the 3.7-inch medium anti-aircraft gun and the Bofors 40 mm gun. For the latter, Nottingham made the mobile mounts for the British Army from 1938 onwards, and was the main producer of mountings for British ships, including the Stabilised Tachymetric Anti-Aircraft Gun, STAAG. The 2 Pounder anti-tank gun was made at Nottingham from 1937 to 1939. The BL 5.5-inch Medium Gun (1940–42) and the 17 pounder gun, including conversions of the Sherman tank into the 17 pdr armed Sherman Firefly. The hull and suspension units for the first prototype A41 tank, later to be named as the Centurion tank, were built at Nottingham.

== Post-war era ==
=== Immediate post-war years ===
As would be expected, the period immediately after the war (1946–50) saw little or no armament production and caused the factory to diversify widely, into initially unlikely fields.

Products at this time included tunnelling shields, parts for hosiery machines, structural parts for band-saws and other light wood working machinery, generators, gearboxes for Guy motor-buses, printers guillotines and forging dies for Raleigh pedal cycle cranks.

Autumn 1950 saw the start of another re-armament drive, which became particularly apparent the following year. The Nottingham Journal of Wednesday 6 June 1951 described Nottingham as the 'second largest factory after Woolwich Deep hole boring was claimed to be ten times faster than in World War II (the gun in question being the 20 pdr for early Centurions) and the major non-gun activity was the rework of Comet tanks.

The next few years do not seem to have been very busy, but in the late fifties activity picked up on various vehicle and specialist projects; manning levels were quite low: there were 517 people employed in October 1956, falling to 408 two years later, whilst a staff chart for March 1959 listed only 84 staff from the Factory Superintendent down to the Assistant Foreman in the Forges.

Projects:

- "Yellow Fever" – Fire Control Equipment AA Mk 7 (c1955-61)
- Aircraft Freight Loader (1958)
- Truck, 1 ton, Armoured 4 × 4 Humber c1959-60
- Centurion Tank Mk 5 Rework (1959–62?)
- Bristol Bloodhound Surface-to-air missile launchers c1959-63?
- Bofors 40 L70 (more powerful development of the World War II gun) c1958-62?
- Hornet Malkara missile launcher vehicle c1962
- 10 ton Recovery Vehicle jib assembly c1962
- Centurion ARK work c1963

=== Later years ===
Later projects included the Heavy Dummy Axle (HDA) and the Eager Beaver Air Portable Rough Terrain Fork Lift Truck (APFLT) from roughly 1969–1973.

The Bar Mine Layer, the Light Mobile Digger (LMD) trench digging machine, and the manufacture and assembly of the FV180 Combat Engineer Tractor were made from 1978 to 1983, although ROF Leeds was also heavily involved in production of this vehicle.

Large guns produced included the Royal Ordnance L7 105 mm tank ordnance, which was for a long time one of the most important products, and the 165 mm demolition gun that fired a very large HESH projectile and was fitted to the FV4003 Centurion Mk 5 AVRE (Armoured Vehicle Royal Engineers). Other guns included the 76 mm L5 and 76 mm L23 for armoured cars, the 105 mm L13 for the Abbot SP artillery, the L16 81mm Mortar for the Infantry, and to provide an even more tangible link with the present, the 105 mm L119 and L118 Light Gun for the Artillery.

The first delivery of the L118 to the British Army took place in 1974, a variant of the L119 Light Gun – which was type classified in record time by the United States Army as the M119 howitzer.

On 2 January 1985, the government owned Royal Ordnance factories, including ROFN, were privatised as a public corporation called Royal Ordnance plc.

The sale of ROF Leeds to Vickers plc and closure of the Royal Small Arms Factory (RSAF), Enfield, both had their effects on the site: RO Leeds, causing a considerable amount of vehicle and vehicle-related work to come to Nottingham; and RSAF Enfield, causing the Small Arms Facility in South Shop to be created.

By mid-1987, the South Shop has become disused and was in a semi-derelict condition. The building was remodelled and converted into the Nottingham Small Arms Facility (NSAF). A small arms proof and test range was built in what was once an air-raid shelter, and a tube test range installed. From 1988, the SA80 assault rifle was manufactured at the facility.

Circa 1989, ROFN designed the Royal Ordnance L30 gun for the Challenger 2 tank project.

== Closure ==
ROF Nottingham was finally closed in 2001 and the armaments manufacturing capability transferred to the BAE Systems Land Systems plant at Barrow-In-Furness, Cumbria.

A building especially constructed to house the MOD Small Arms Museum collection was known as the Pattern Room. On closure the collection was transferred to the Royal Armouries Museum in Leeds.

== See also ==
- Board of Ordnance
- List of Royal Ordnance Factories
- Royal Ordnance Factories
- Royal Ordnance
- Royal Small Arms Factory
