= Thermal sleeve =

Insulation on large caliber gun barrels

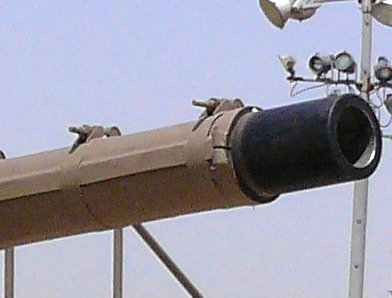
A bolt-on thermal sleeve

A thermal sleeve, or blanket, is a device around the length of a gun barrel of a large caliber gun, typically found on modern tanks. Its primary purpose is to provide a more consistent temperature to the gun barrel, preventing distortions due to differential thermal expansion caused by the temperature differences around the barrel when firing.

Thermal sleeves were originally simply insulators. They would prevent ambient conditions such as bright sunlight or winds from heating or cooling one side of a barrel more than the other, which would cause thermal distortion (bending or drooping) and reduce accuracy. More modern variants contain concentric inner and outer insulating sleeves with a gap in between. Versions have been created which are detachable from a given barrel so that they can be re-used with a replacement barrel. Proposals exist for types that have advanced external thermal and radar profiles, reducing their thermal and radar signatures in order to make the barrel and thereby the tank harder to detect.

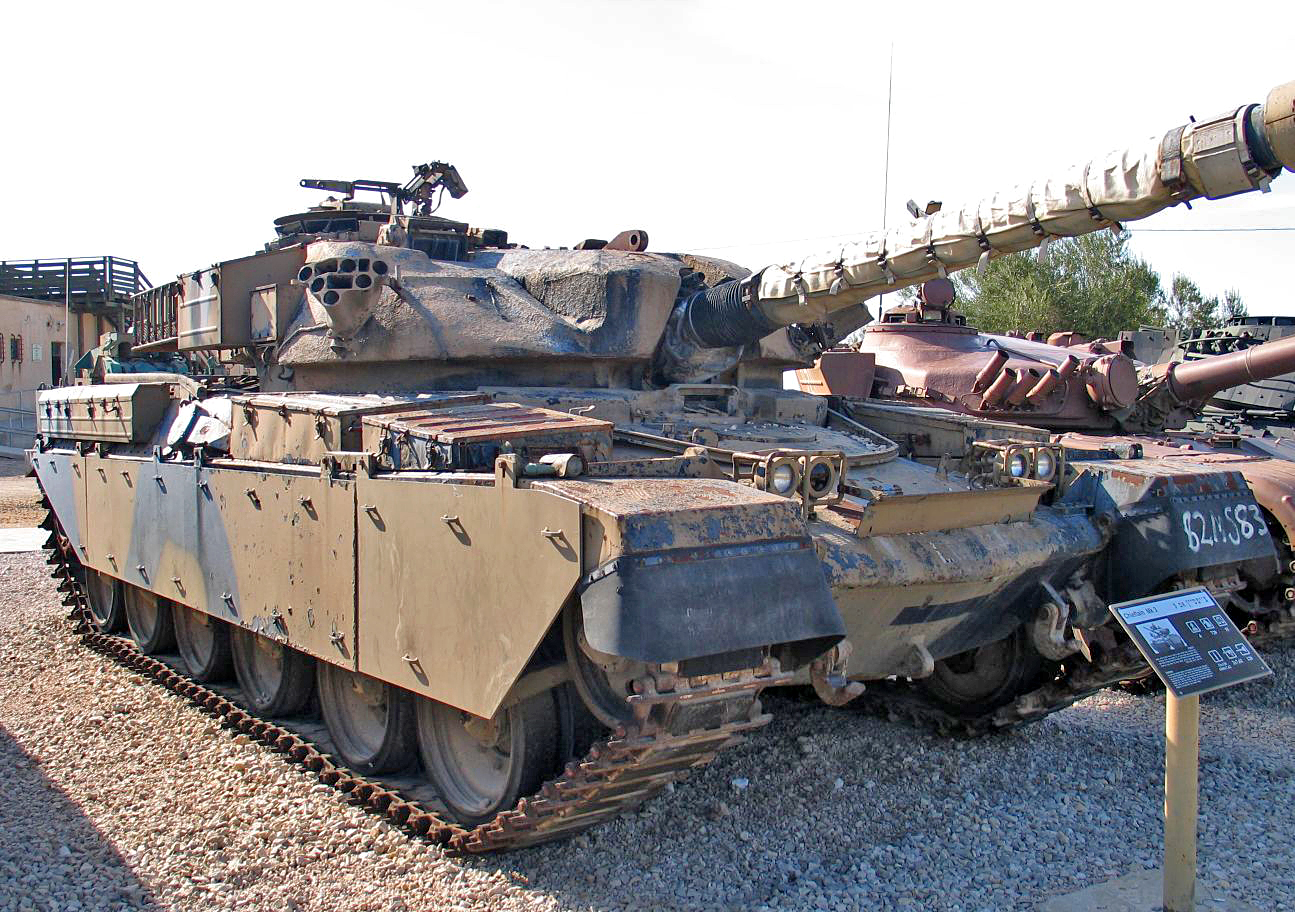
The canvas-covered thermal sleeve on a Chieftain tank

One of the earliest guns to use a thermal sleeve was the Royal Ordnance L11 used on the Chieftain tank.

== See also ==
- Barrel shroud

== Bibliography ==
- Tucker, Spencer C. (2004). Tanks: An Illustrated History of Their Impact. California: ABC-CLIO. ISBN 1-57607-995-3.
