= M60-2000 =

- Type: Main battle tank
- Place of origin: United States

Production history
- Manufacturer: General Dynamics
- Produced: 2001
- No. built: 1 (120S prototype only)

Specifications
- Mass: 56.52 tonnes (62.30 short tons; 55.63 long tons)
- Length: 9.55 m (31 ft 4 in) (gun forward)
- Width: 3.77 m (12 ft 5 in)
- Height: 2.89 m (9 ft 6 in)
- Crew: 4 (commander, gunner, loader, driver)
- Armor: 120S Prototype; Turret: Burlington composite armor Hull Upper Glacis: 4.29 in (109 mm) at 65° 10.15 in (258 mm) LoS
- Main armament: 120 mm M256 smoothbore cannon
- Secondary armament: 2 x M240C 7.62 (0.30 in) MGs and 1 x M2HB 12.7 mm (0.50 in) MG
- Engine: Continental V-12 750 hp (560 kW) air-cooled, AVDS-1790-2 diesel engine and CD-850-6 cross drive transmission (prototype); 750bhp
- Suspension: Torsion bar suspension
- Operational range: 443 km (275 mi)
- Maximum speed: 51.6 km/h (33 mph)

The General Dynamics Land Systems (GDLS) M60-2000 or 120S was an upgrade developed for the M60 tank. The development of the M60-2000 was initiated primarily due to the large number of M60 main battle tanks in service with many Middle Eastern nations unable to afford a sufficient force of more modern main battle tanks. The upgrade was marketed at those M60 users with the industrial capability to convert the tanks themselves. The M60-2000/120S was a GDLS supplied conversion kit that married the turret of the M1A1 variant of the M1 Abrams to the M60A1 hull of the M60, offering many features of the M1A1 Abrams to existing M60 users at a reduced cost.

== Development ==
It was first referred to the M60-2000 Program and design work began in late 1999 by General Dynamics Land Systems as a private venture for the export market and was never evaluated for US military service. Later the M60 designation was dropped because of the extensive changes and to highlight this as a new vehicle to potential customers thus changing the name to the 120S Project. The 120 represented the gun, and S according to company marketing stood for Speed and Survivability. Two of the major upgrades this would offer to the M60 series of the vehicle. It is essentially a hybrid vehicle consisting of an M1A1 version of the Abrams tank turret mated to a M60A1 hull. The M60-2000 was test-marketed during 2000 and a number of countries in NATO and the Middle East were briefed on the vehicle. Following customer feedback, detailed engineering work was carried out and in December GDLS decided to build a functional prototype. In August 2001 the company rolled out the fully functional prototype of the 120S tank at their Detroit, Michigan, facility. The prototype was shown at the IDEF Exhibition held in Turkey in October 2001.

== Description ==
During development an upgrade to the M60A3 turret was considered, but the M1A1 turret was used because of its higher level of armor protection and the fact that the 120 mm ammunition is separated in the turret bustle. For the 120S Project the M1A1 turret and M60A1 series chassis were leased from the US Army. The turret is mated to the existing M60 chassis using an adapter ring that allows the use of the M1A1 wire race ring with no turret modifications. It consisted of a functional M1A1 turret, M1 turret gear box, hydraulic pump and an M1A1 slip ring adapter. Many of the subsystems were already well proven and in volume production.

The turret armor is of a composite material and lacks the protective depleted uranium (DU) meshing found in the M1A1HA (Heavy Armor) variant of the Abrams tank. The hull armor is conventional hardened steel. It was planned that armor packages for the production vehicles would be customized for each customer. Available options included additional STANAG Level 6 armor plating for the hull frontal arc to the third road wheel, slat/cage armor skirting for the turret, steel or composite armored side skirts, spall liners and reactive armor packages.

The M60A1 chassis was modified with the enhanced torsion bar system of the M1 series tank to take account of the additional weight of the M1A1 turret as well as the additional armor that would have been fitted to production vehicles. An optional offering was to replace the torsion bar suspension with hydropneumatic units for improved cross-country ride. The prototype of the 120S retains the standard M60 series power pack consisting of a Continental V-12 750 hp (560 kW) air-cooled, AVDS-1790-2 diesel engine with a CD-850-6 cross drive transmission, with a range of 275 miles (443 kilometres). It was envisioned that production vehicles would have the more powerful General Dynamics Land Systems AVDS-1790-9 diesel developing 1,200 hp (890 kW) and Allison X-1100-5 series automatic transmission extending operational range to over 300 miles (480 km) but other power pack combinations were also offered as well as road wheels and drive sprocket being replaced by M1A1 components and the Abrams T158 lightweight track if desired. The upper part of the suspension of the prototype is fitted with mock ballistic side skirts and new sponsions. It has a crew of 4, the commander, loader and gunner are positioned in the turret and the driver in the front of the hull.

== Weapons systems ==
The main weapon is a fully stabilized M256 120 mm smoothbore gun with a thermal sleeve as used on the M1A1 version of the Abrams tank and carries 36 rounds in the turret bustle. The ammunition is stored in the turret bustle with blow-out panels for better survivability. Production versions planned to have additional round storage in safe boxes on the hull floor. Secondary armament consists of two M240C 7.62 mm machine guns. One of them is mounted coaxially on the right of the main gun, another is mounted over the loader's hatch. There is also a roof-mounted M2HB 12.7 mm machine gun, mounted over commander's hatch. The turret is fitted with two six-barreled, electronically fired M250 smoke grenade launchers, one on each side of the main gun. The smoke grenades contain a phosphor compound that masks thermal signature of the vehicle to the enemy. A Vehicle Engine Exhaust Smoke System (VEESS) can also be laid from the engine operated system to visually obscure the area around the vehicle.

The electronics package used components designed by Hughes consisting of a 240X4 Forward Looking Infrared (FLIR) day/FLIR stabilized sight with an eye-safe laser range-finder, a Thermal Imaging System (TIS), an onboard digital fire control computer and data bus providing a similar capability as the M1 Abrams Mark 1 Advanced Fire Control System. Production vehicles would also have a BITE (Built In Test Equipment) package.

== Results ==
The 120S was initially aimed at the Turkish Land Forces Command (TLFC) M60 upgrade requirement but this competition was subsequently won by Israel Military Industries with their Sabra II upgrade. The Egyptian Army was considering this offer until it was finally rejected in favor of a licensed contract to build M1s in Egypt. Only one prototype was made. As of early 2009 there were no sales of the 120S tank and was no longer mentioned in General Dynamics marketing literature. The prototype was disassembled and the hull and turret returned to the US Army in 2003.

== See also ==
- Sabra (tank) – (United States, Israel, Turkey)
- M60 tank – (United States)
- CM11 Brave Tiger – (Taiwan)

== Sources ==
- Zaloga, Steven; Sarson, Peter (1993). M1 Abrams Main Battle Tank 1982–1992. New Vanguard (Book 2). Oxford, UK: Osprey Publishing. ISBN 1-85532-283-8.
