= M829 =

American armor-piercing tank round

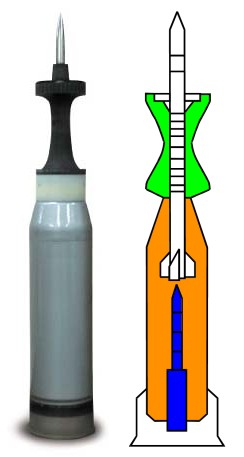
electric primer propellant sabot DU penetrator

The M829 is an American armor-piercing fin-stabilized discarding sabot (APFSDS) kinetic energy penetrator tank round. Modeling was done at the Ballistic Research Laboratory at Aberdeen Proving Ground, which was incorporated into the Army Research Laboratory in 1992. The round is specifically designed for the 120 mm M256 main gun on the Abrams M1A1 and M1A2 main battle tanks. The penetrator is carried by a sabot during its acceleration in the gun barrel.

== Variants ==
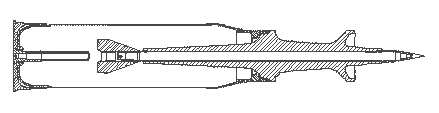
A diagram of an M829A2 round

=== M829 ===
The M829 dart has a ballistic nose and six tail fins made of aluminum. It is carried in the gun tube by a four-piece aluminum sabot, which separates into four "petals" soon after the round leaves the gun tube. The propulsion system uses an obturating case base with a semi-combustible cartridge wall. It has a total weight of 41.1 lb (18.6 kg) and a 627 mm (24.7 in) DU penetrator with a 27 mm (1.1 in) rod diameter, which reaches a muzzle velocity of 1,670 meters per second (5,500 ft/s) using 8.1 kg (18 lb) of JA-2 propellant. Its maximum effective range is 3,000 m (3,300 yd). According to Jane's, the M829 is capable of penetrating 540 mm (21 in) of RHA steel armor at up to a 2,000 m (2,200 yd) range. The original M829 is no longer in production and has been succeeded by the M829A1, M829A2, and M829A3. The corresponding training round is the M865, costing $1,121.

=== M829A1 ===
The M829A1 (nicknamed the "Silver Bullet" by Operation Desert Storm tank crews) proved itself in 1991 against Iraqi T-55 and T-72M tanks during Operation Desert Storm. The M829A1 round weighs 20.9 kg (46 lb) and has an overall length of 984 mm (38.7 in). The 7.9 kg (17 lb) of JA-19 propellant creates a chamber pressure of 5,600 bars (81,221 psi), which results in a muzzle velocity of 1,575 m/s (5,170 ft/s). The 684-millimeter-long (26.9 in) penetrator and its sabot together weigh 9 kg (20 lb). The mass of the penetrator alone is 4.6 kg (10 lb). The effective target range is 3,000 m (3,300 yd).

=== M829A2 ===
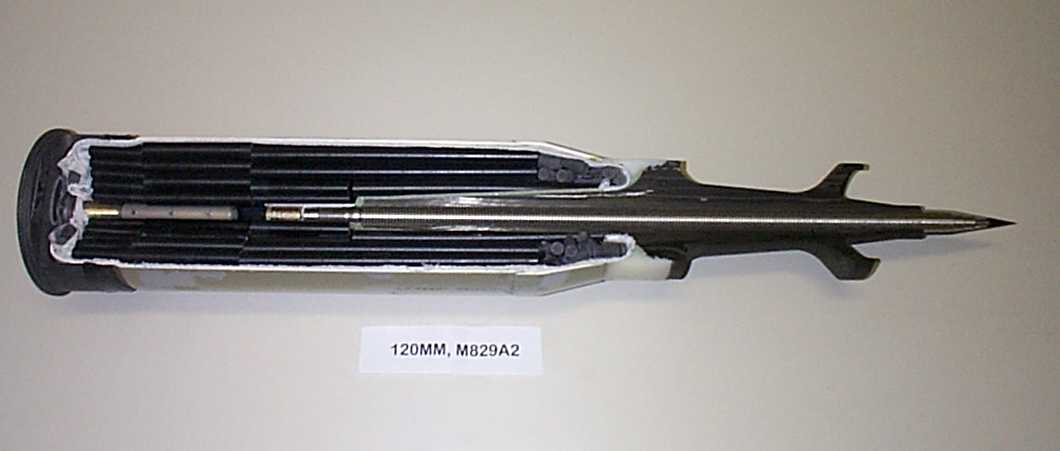
M829A2 cross-section

The next generation ammunition, called 120 mm APFSDS-T M829A2, entered service in 1994. It was the U.S. immediate response to testing done to T-72 fitted with Kontakt-5, showing it was immune to the DU penetrators of M829 APFSDS, fired by the 120 mm guns of the US M1 Abrams tanks, which are among the most formidable of current tank gun projectiles. It is a technology improvement over the M829A1. Designed to "Brute force" through the ERA. The new ammunition's performance gains, while classified, result from several new features. These include a special manufacturing process that improves the structural quality of the depleted uranium penetrator. This, the use of new composites for the sabot, and a new propellant provide superior penetrator performance. Combined, these features increase the muzzle velocity of the M829A2 to approximately 100 m/s greater than the M829A1's (up to approximately 1,675 m/s) while operating at slightly lower pressure. The projectile's length is 780 mm, its mass 9 kg.

On 6 May 2014, the U.S. Army announced that it awarded a US$12 million contract to defense contractor General Dynamics for the demilitarization and disposal of 78,000 aging depleted-uranium (DU) tank rounds as newer rounds are added to the U.S. war reserves. The contract includes M829A1 and M829A2 rounds.

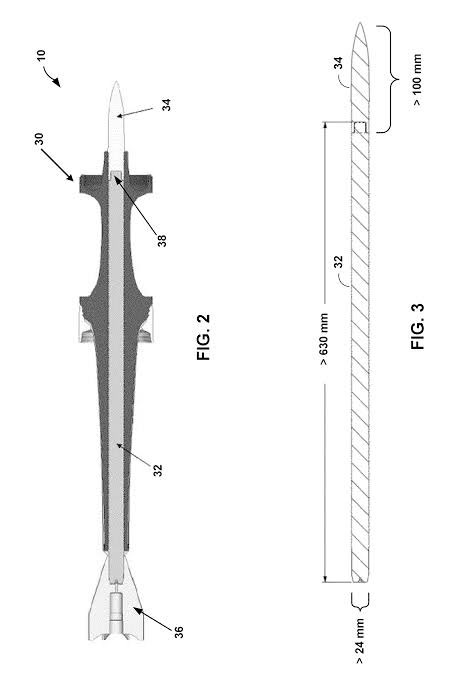
M829A3 Cross section

=== M829A3 ===
The M829A3 is a further improvement, designed to defeat any future armor protection methods like the newer Kaktus type, which was fitted on to the prototype tanks such as the "Chiorny Oriol" (Black Eagle) tank, later developed into Relikt (ERA) It completed type classification standard in March 2003. Very little is publicly known about the round, perhaps due to export restrictions (see International Traffic in Arms Regulations (ITAR)). The M829A3 uses a more efficient propellant, RPD-380, boosting its muzzle velocity. The M829A3 round has a total mass of 22.3 kg (49 lb) and length of 892 mm (35.1 in). It uses 8.1 kg (18 lb) of RPD-380 stick propellant, accelerating the 10 kg (22 lb) sabot and depleted-uranium rod penetrator assembly, and a muzzle velocity of 1,555 m/s (5,100 ft/s). From patents submitted by Orbital ATK, the penetrator is composed of two sections, an approximately 100-millimeter-long (3.9 in) steel tip and the rest composed of a 630-millimeter (24.8 in) depleted uranium rod with aluminum fins and a tracer base. The penetrator diameter was also increased from 22 mm (0.87 in) to 25 mm (0.98 in), improving penetrator strength by 67% significantly increasing its resistance to ERA bursting plates as used in Russian ERA. The steel tip is used to defeat the ERA by detonating it early, causing the resulting ERA bursting plate to only partially affect the main DU rod which is used to complete the penetration through armor. The resulting muzzle energy is 12.1 MJ (8.9 million ft⋅lbf) The penetration as per the Lanz Odermatt calculator is about a total penetration of 680-millimeters (26.7717 in) up to possibly 720-millimetres of RHA to account for any discrepancies in measurement. The M829A3 is only used for training with a switched plastic sabot round. This is calculated from the 100-millimeter (3.9 in) steel tip adjoined to a 630-millimeter (24.8 in) DU body that is 25-millimeter (0.98 in) thick at 1550m/s (5085 fps) with a target RHA BHN of 250. The sabot is of composite material. This variant is unofficially referred to by Abrams tank crews as the "super sabot". Although the M829A3 fired from the 44-caliber M256 gun has a lower muzzle velocity than 120 mm shells fired from the Rheinmetall 55-caliber gun barrel or Russian 2A46 125 mm gun ammunition, it uses a larger penetrator with increased mass to increase imparted kinetic energy.

=== M829A4 ===
The A4 (formerly E4) variant was under development by General Dynamics Ordnance & Tactical Systems and Alliant Techsystems (ATK) until ATK received a $77 million, three-year contract on 11 July 2011 to develop and qualify the M829A4 Advanced Kinetic Energy (AKE) round for the U.S. Army's M1A2 SEP (System Enhancement Package) Abrams MBT.

The M829A4 is a fifth-generation APFSDS-T cartridge using a depleted-uranium penetrator with a three-petal composite sabot; the penetrator includes a low-drag fin with a tracer and a windshield and tip assembly. Its propellant maintains consistent muzzle velocities across operational temperatures from −25 to 145 °F (−32 to 63 °C). The new Advanced Combustible Cartridge Case is similar to previous models but has a relocated skive joint placement for better crew-member safety during handling. The initial order for 2,501 M829A4 rounds in 2014 had a unit cost of $10,100 each. On 20 July 2015, Orbital ATK announced that the M829A4 had passed First Article Acceptance Testing and was entering production. On 12 October 2015, Orbital ATK announced the round had recently received type classification as the M829A4 and was awarded a full-rate production contract to begin in early 2016.

== See also ==
- KE-W
