= K1 tank =

South Korean main battle tank

K1
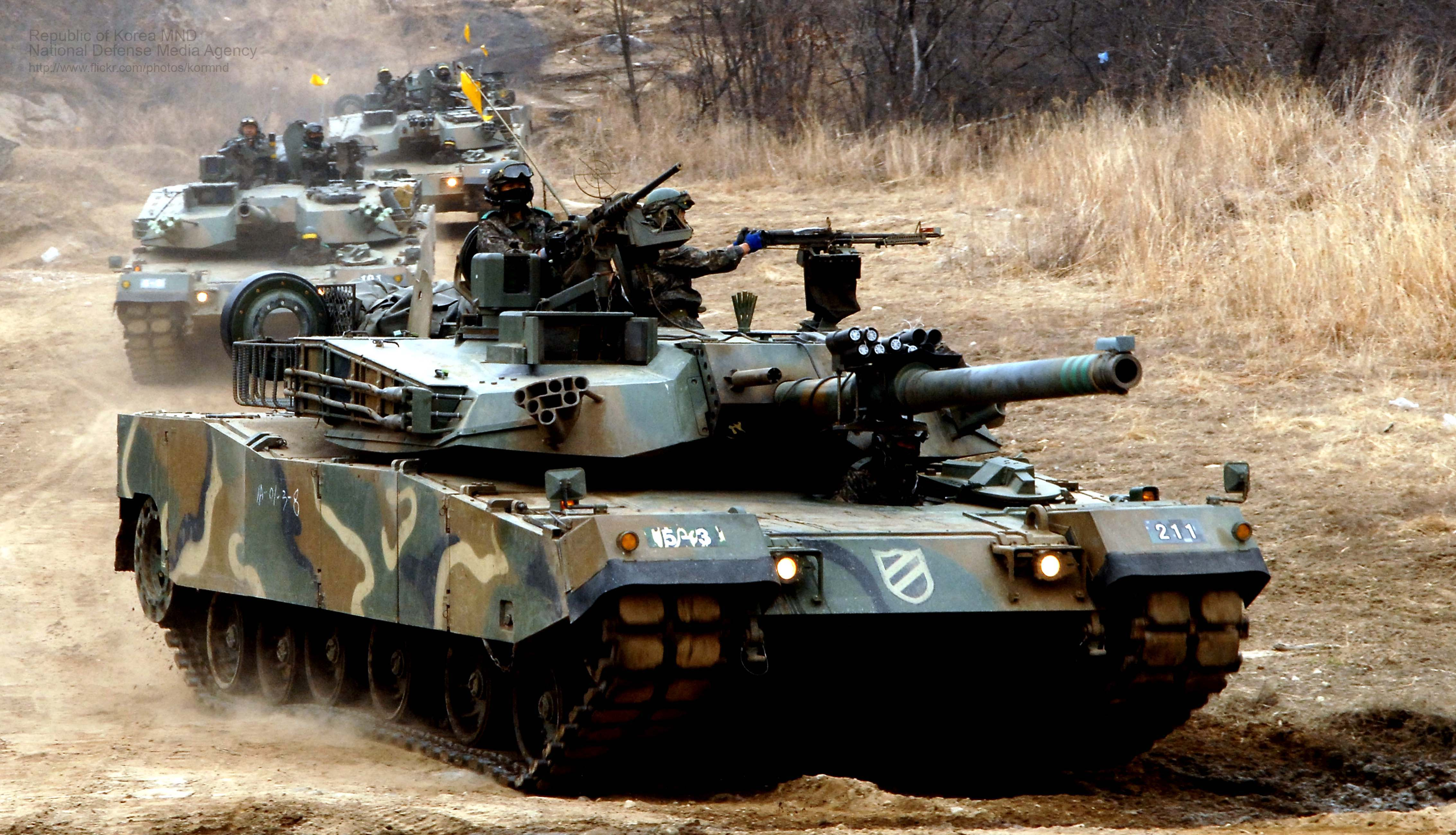
- Field training exercise of the 11th Division of the South Korean army in April 2013
- Type: Main battle tank
- Place of origin: South Korea

Service history
- In service: K1: 1987–present; K1E1: 2014–present; K1A1: 2001–2024; K1A2: 2013–present
- Used by: See operators

Production history
- Designer: Chrysler Defense; General Dynamics Land Systems; Hyundai Precision Industry; Agency for Defense Development
- Designed: K1: 1978–1985; K1A1: 1991–1996
- Manufacturer: Hyundai Precision Industry (1985–2000); Hyundai Mobis (2000–2001); Rotem Co., Ltd. (2001–2007); Hyundai Rotem (2007–present)
- Unit cost: K1: ₩2.3 billion (1994); K1A1: ₩4.4 billion (2001); K1A2: ₩6.0 billion
- Produced: K1: 1987–1997; K1E1: 2013–present; K1A1: 1999–2011; K1A2: 2013–2024
- No. built: K1/E1: 1,027; K1A1/A2: 484

Specifications
- Mass: K1: 51.1 metric tons; K1A1: 53.2 metric tons; K1A2: 54.5 metric tons
- Length: K1: 9.67 m (gun forward); K1A1: 9.71 m (gun forward)
- Width: 3.60 m
- Height: 2.25 m
- Crew: 4
- Armor: K1: Special Armor Package (SAP); K1A1: Korean Special Armor Plate (KSAP)
- Main armament: K1, K1E1: KM68A1 105 mm (47 rounds); K1A1, K1A2: KM256 120 mm (32 rounds), or Hyundai WIA CN03 120 mm (32 rounds)
- Secondary armament: M2 or K6 12.7x99 mm NATO HMG (commander's mount); M60D 7.62×51mm NATO GPMG (loader's mount); M60E2-1 7.62×51mm NATO GPMG (coaxial)
- Engine: STX Engine/MTU Friedrichshafen MB871Ka-501 8-cylinder water-cooled turbocharged diesel engine 1,200 hp (890 kW) @ 2,600 rpm
- Power/weight: K1: 23.4 hp/ton (17.44 kW/t); K1A1: 22.5 hp/ton (16.77 kW/t); K1A2: 22 hp/ton (16.40 kW/t)
- Transmission: Hyundai Transys/ZF Friedrichshafen LSG 3000; Automatic, 4 forward, 2 reverse
- Suspension: Hydropneumatic (wheel 1, 2, 6), torsion bar (wheel 3, 4, 5)
- Ground clearance: 460 mm (18 in): longitudinal slope: 60 %; lateral slope: 30 %; vertical: 1.1 m; trench: 2.74 m; fording: 1.2 m (without snorkel) or 2.2 m (with snorkel)
- Operational range: 500 km (cruise)
- Maximum speed: 65 km/h (40 mph) (roads); 40 km/h (25 mph) (cross-country)

The K1, sometimes referred to as the 88 Tank (88 전차), is a South Korean main battle tank designed by Chrysler Defense (later General Dynamics Land Systems) and Hyundai Precision Industry (later Hyundai Rotem) for the Republic of Korea Armed Forces. It is a derivative of Chrysler's M1 Abrams, tailored to meet unique ROK requirements. The K1A1 is an upgraded variant based on the GDLS technical data package with a 120 mm 44 caliber smoothbore gun, and is outfitted with more modern electronics, ballistic computers, fire control systems, and armor. Hyundai Rotem produced 1,511 K1 and K1A1 tanks between 1986 and 2011.

== Development ==
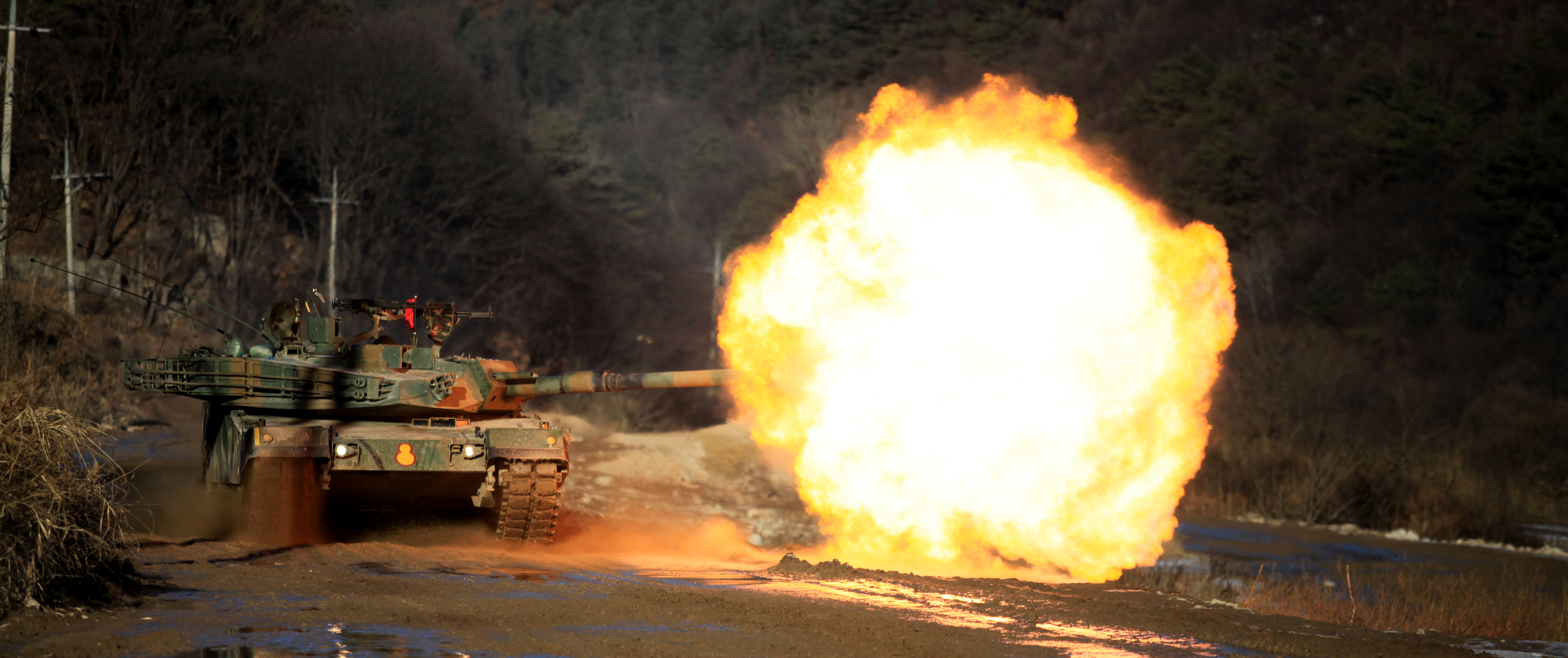
K1 combat firing practice, 8th Division

In the early 1970s, South Korea received an intelligence report about North Korea locally producing Soviet T-62 tanks. Meanwhile, the U.S. 7th Infantry Division began withdrawing from South Korea from 1969 to 1971 under the Nixon Doctrine. South Korean President Park Chung Hee requested the latest variant of M60 tanks to maintain the balance of power. However, the United States responded by transferring used M48 tanks and providing upgrades instead; South Korea received 25 M48A5s from the United States Forces Korea and numerous M48A3s that were used, but in good condition, during the Vietnam War.

Under the agreement, South Korea received the technical data package (TDP) of the M48 Patton and its upgrade kits for 12 major enhancements. South Korean engineers were sent to the United States Army Depot in Alabama for training, such as armor cast steel welding and production, precision manufacturing, assembling skills, quality inspection, and test evaluation. Around the same time, Park Chung Hee ordered the development of a domestic tank and personally summoned Chung Ju-yung, the founder of Hyundai Group, to recommend building a tank factory. Chung Ju-yung, thinking that the president asked for a train factory, promised to build one. (Note: The Korean words for tank and train are written and spoken exactly the same: 전차 (jeoncha). The only difference is their Hanja: tank (戰車) vs train (電車).) The chairman was shocked after learning about his misunderstanding from the president's secretary as he was leaving the building.

Not satisfied with the M48 Patton upgrade, South Korea began looking for a new tank that could overwhelm every North Korean counterpart, as the existence of the T-62 and its manufacturing facility were confirmed by satellite images in 1976. South Korea first asked Chrysler Defense for a solution to acquire a better tank, and Chrysler suggested purchasing the M60A3 or producing it in South Korea. Because the American offer was an outdated design, South Korea then contacted KraussMaffei of West Germany to receive technical assistance, and KraussMaffei offered a unique tank design based on the Leopard 1. Both South Korea and West Germany kept the cooperation secret because the two nations believed that the United States would intervene once the information had been leaked. In 1977, as expected, Chrysler Defense showed interest in the South Korean tank project after its engineers became available and wanted to generate more profit after the development of the M1 Abrams. This time, Chrysler offered a new tank based on the newest M1 Abrams. Eventually, the American design was chosen, and a memorandum of understanding (MOU) was signed on 6 July 1978 to supply two prototypes, and the executive contract was signed on 1 December 1978.

Between 1979 and 1980, several MOUs were signed between the two nations, mostly regarding intellectual rights and royalty payments. According to the MOUs, the United States would provide and install its state-of-art Special Armor Package (SAP), in which the material and protection were identical to the M1 Abrams, while restricting South Koreans during its installation due to national security reasons. Exporting of the K1 is strictly controlled and needs authorization from the United States as many sensitive systems are installed, and South Korea was required to pay a royalty to Chrysler Defense. Also, 44 designated parts (gradually reduced to 14) cannot be changed without United States approval, and some parts must be purchased periodically. In addition, South Korea would have the rights on, and be limited to, the technologies developed uniquely with the money provided by South Korea, while Chrysler also claimed the rights to use them in the future. On the other hand, South Korea benefited from the development cost of the cooperation with Chrysler; South Korea paid $60 million for the prototype development, far below the $700 million spent on the M1 Abrams. However, the biggest disadvantage in the agreement for South Korea was that Hyundai Precision Industry, which had planned to produce the tank at its new factory, was excluded from direct involvement in designing the tank. Since Koreans had not made tanks before, they would be unable to produce tanks as they did not understand the structure and technology of the tank even with prototypes in hand.

From October 1980 to April 1981, Chrysler had three meetings with Hyundai to confirm the required operational capability (ROC) and presented a small-scale mock-up and reports. During the production of the prototypes, Chrysler Defense was sold to General Dynamics Land Systems (GDLS) in March 1982. Two ROKIT (Republic of Korea Indigenous Tank) prototypes were delivered with designations PV-1 (MTR - mobility test rig) and PV-2 (FTR - firepower test rig) in 1983 and were tested at Aberdeen Proving Ground based on U.S. military standards. During the trial, the PV-1 failed to climb the longitudinal slope of 60%, experienced a fire on the 1,200 hp Teledyne Continental Motors AVCR-1790 engine. PV-2 also reported issues with its fire control system: winter frost causing LOS (line of sight) to shake, system takes too much time to warm up, electromagnetic waves interferences, and lock up of the ballistic computer. Protection tests were done on separately built ballistic hulls and turrets, which showed some flaws during the test. Eventually, many known problems were fixed. In the end, GDLS transferred the PV-1 along with 1,370 pages of blueprints and the TDP, but the number of blueprints was insufficient to produce the tank.

GDLS XK1 Phase 1 vs Phase 2
Model	GDLS XK1 (Phase 1, 1981, mock-up)	GDLS XK1 (Phase 2, 1982, 2 built)
Commander	—	12.7 mm or 7.62 mm machine gun mount Added LED display and monocentric eyepiece
Gunner	Newer design power control handle	Integrated azimuth data to ballistic computer Relocation of systems Conventional power control handle
Loader	Turret ring: 78 inches	Turret ring: 85 inches Increased head clearance (Mainly for loader's comfort)
Driver	Regular telescope M1-style chassis frontal angle Gear shift integrated in T-bar	All-position telescope Lowered frontal angle for better view Gear shift separated and moved to driver's right side Remodeled panel configuration
Side skirts	RHA	RHA + SAP
Suspension	HSU: 1, 5, 6 Torsion bar: 2, 3, 4	HSU: 1, 2, 6 Torsion bar: 3, 4, 5
Gun depression	-6 degrees (with kneeling)	-10 degrees (with kneeling)
Engine bay	—	Power pack air filters restructured

During the development phase, a team of Korean engineers from Hyundai Precision Industry was dispatched to join Chrysler's developer team to look over the progress. Although the contract limits the technological access of Koreans, engineers from both nations freely shared information during friendship interactions, including a classified specification of the M1 Abrams. When the upper management of Chrysler found out about this, they built a wall in the office to prevent information leakage. However, Koreans managed to obtain significant data during their three-year presence. In addition, the manufacturing team of Hyundai came for a tour of the American tank factory to understand how to build a tank factory. Despite being denied for detailed inspection, Koreans memorized required machine tools and facility size by counting footsteps, which helped to build a new factory at Changwon.

In 1983, Hyundai accepted GDLS' new offer and acquired special welding of armor plates, assembly of major devices, and weapon testing technologies. Thirty engineers from GDLS were also sent to South Korea and participated in producing and testing preproduction models. From September 1984 to August 1985, a total of five practical prototypes (XK1) were completed (two for the Agency for Defense Development (ADD), two for the ROK Army, and one for the Army logistics), and went for further testing in South Korea. However, Hyundai realized that GDLS had made a crucial mistake by providing outdated blueprints that did not reflect the latest fixes, and XK1s began to experience the same issues they saw from early prototypes. In addition, the lack of detailed blueprints forced Korean engineers to rework the tank and create five thousand design changes and ten thousand pages of blueprints. The biggest change during this process was the switching of the mobility system from American to German, in which the design change was done by GDLS. The air-cooled AVCR-1790 had lower torque, was thus unable to drive at high incline angles, and experienced fire several times, contributing to unexpected fire tests that challenged the tank's survivability. For this reason, the MTU Friedrichshafen MB871Ka-501 water-cooled engine and the ZF Friedrichshafen LSG 3000 transmission were chosen for the new power pack. These preproduction variants entered service with the South Korean military in February 1986.

Meanwhile, Hughes' GPSS (Gunner's Primary Sight System) continuously suffered with issues such as low accuracy and operational uses. Also, South Korea gave up localizing the GPSS as Hughes doubled the price for the license. Later, GDLS, which acquired Hughes in 1985, revealed that the system uses parts from Canada, West Germany, and Switzerland, and thus requires time-consuming multinational cooperation to solve problems. In 1986, another contract was signed between Hyundai and GDLS for updating the GPSS, increasing the cost of the gunner's sight. This unsatisfactory situation led South Koreans to look for alternative options immediately. In April 1987, the K1 tank test evaluation for conditional mass production was completed, and serial production began in September 1987. On 18 September, the tank was given the nickname 88-Tank by South Korean president Chun Doo-hwan to celebrate the upcoming 1988 Summer Olympics.

A total of 1,027 K1s were produced between 1986 and 1997 in three batches with design changes in each batch. In 1995, the K1s received their first depot maintenance at Hyundai Precision Industry in the order of production (10-year cycle). The work includes the application of third batch updates on the earlier produced vehicles.

== General characteristics ==
The K1 retains most of the features of the M1 Abrams but also shows differences. Its main armament is a licensed M68A1 105 mm 52 caliber tank gun under designation KM68A1 by Hyundai Precision Industry. The K1 carries 47 rounds of ammunition in the hull and turret. Unlike the M1 Abrams, the K1 lacks ammunition storage in the bustle at the rear of the turret, which is instead filled with radio systems. The main gun is assisted by a 16-bit fire control system and digital ballistic calculator. The tank has either an M2 Browning or SNT Dynamics K6 12.7x99 mm NATO machine gun on the commander's hatch mount, an M60D 7.62×51mm NATO machine gun on the loader's hatch mount, and an M60E2-1 7.62×51mm NATO coaxial machine gun for the gunner as secondary armaments.

The K1 has a size of 9.67 m (length with gun forward) x 3.60 m (width) x 2.25 m (height) and weighs 51.1 t or 51.5 t. It is powered by a German power pack consisting of 1,200 hp (23.5 hp/t) from MTU Friedrichshafen MB871Ka-501 8-cylinder water-cooled turbocharged diesel engine licensed by Ssangyong Heavy Industries (now STX Engine) and ZF Friedrichshafen LSG 3000 transmission licensed by Hyundai Precision Industry (now Hyundai Transys). The tank can drive at a maximum speed of 65 km/h on paved roads and 40 km/h cross-country with a 500 km cruising range. Its chassis uses hybrid suspension combining hydropneumatic suspension on wheels 1, 2, and 6 and torsion bars on wheels 3, 4, and 5. It allows the tank to use kneeling to supplement the depression of the main gun, which is limited by the small-sized turret to -10 degrees, and provides comfort on rough terrains. For comparison, M1 Abrams is 9.77 m x 3.66 m x 2.37 m and weighs 54 t.

The Gun/Turret Drive and Stabilization System (GTDSS) measures and compensates for yawing and pitching, which occur on uneven ground and curved roads, allowing the gun turret to be capable of precise fire while running. The GTDSS consists of an elevation servo system, an elevation drive system, a reference gyro, a traverse servo system, a traverse drive system, a feed-forward gyro, an electronic unit for gun and turret drive, and a steering handle for the gunner. The system is locally produced in South Korea by Dongmyeong Heavy Industries (now Mottrol) since 1992.

The gunner's sight was originally the problematic Hughes GPSS, which uses an Nd:YAG laser for its rangefinder. While South Korea decided to upgrade the GPSS to fix issues, Samsung Electronics signed a deal with Texas Instruments to locally produce the GPTTS (Gunner's Primary Tank Thermal Sight) in 1986. Samsung's goal was to provide the GPTTS by 1987, but serious problems such as the failure of the rangefinder postponed the plan. Due to the delays, a total of 445 K1s were equipped with the GPSS. Meanwhile, Texas Instruments gave technology access to the Agency for Defense Development (ADD) after failing to repair the GPTTS alone, and the combined team solved problems and further improved the sight's range from 2 km to 3 km within a year. Samsung Electronics began supplying the GPTTS in 1991. Later, parliamentary investigation found that lobbies caused the selection of the GPTTS without proper testing, which increased the development cost by 16 billion KRW for repairs. Anyways, on 2 September 1993, the upgraded GPTTS proved to be superior when shooting a target behind smoke screens, which the GPSS failed to do. The GPTTS was a complex and heavier system and uses a carbon dioxide laser range finder, which is safer for human eyes, unlike the Nd:YAG laser that can blind the victim upon contact. The technology gained and negative experience from sights saga made South Korea to pursue domestic development. In May 1992, the ADD and Samsung Electronics started a new gunner's sight project (later known as KGPS: Korean Gunner's Primary Sight) using the Raman laser, believing this laser type will be used widely for future weapon systems. Since South Korea lacked the technology to develop thermal imaging alone, they received cooperation from Israel; ELOP (now Elbit Systems) was in charge of signal detection and initial processing that converts a thermal image into an electrical signal, while mechanical structures, cables, and monitors were designed by Koreans. In 1995, Europe announced the use of Raman lasers for tanks, followed by the United States. The KGPS development was completed in December 1996 and achieved under 60% unit cost compared to the GPTTS.

The commander's sight is from SFIM (now SAGEM) of France, and it has a hunter-killer ability that allows tank crews to engage multiple targets at once by allowing the commander to search 360 degrees and direct the main gun. The hunter-killer feature was a major difference compared to the M1 Abrams, where it only becomes available with the M1A2 upgrade. The commander's sight was not, however, equipped with light amplification or thermal optics, which led to the commander to rely on personal night vision goggles for night operation, while the gunner's sight was equipped with a thermal observation device, which meant that the K1 had superior sensors until the introduction of the M1A2.

The Special Armor Package (SAP) is a classified composite armor used for the K1 tanks crafted by the United States using identical materials and technologies used on the armor of M1 Abrams. Its specifications are strictly restricted for public release and limit South Koreans from accessing the armor. The SAP is applied on the turret and the front of the hull. Meanwhile, the side of the hull is protected with additional RHA plates, which provide protection from all types of 115 mm ammunition fired from T-62 tanks in the hands of North Korea at the time of the development. According to the media report, the frontal armor of the K1 baseline is between 400 and 500 mm against KE projectiles. Smoke grenade launchers are located on each outer side of the turret front. The vehicle is also equipped with a fire-extinguishing system in the engine room, where the system notifies crews to activate automatic extinguishers when a thermometer detects a critical temperature. The extinguishant used is Halon 1301, commonly used by western main battle tanks. The vehicle lacks an overpressure system for CBRN defense, and thus requires tank crews to wear personal protective gear to operate in chemical, biological, radiological, and nuclear warfare environments.

=== K1A1 ===
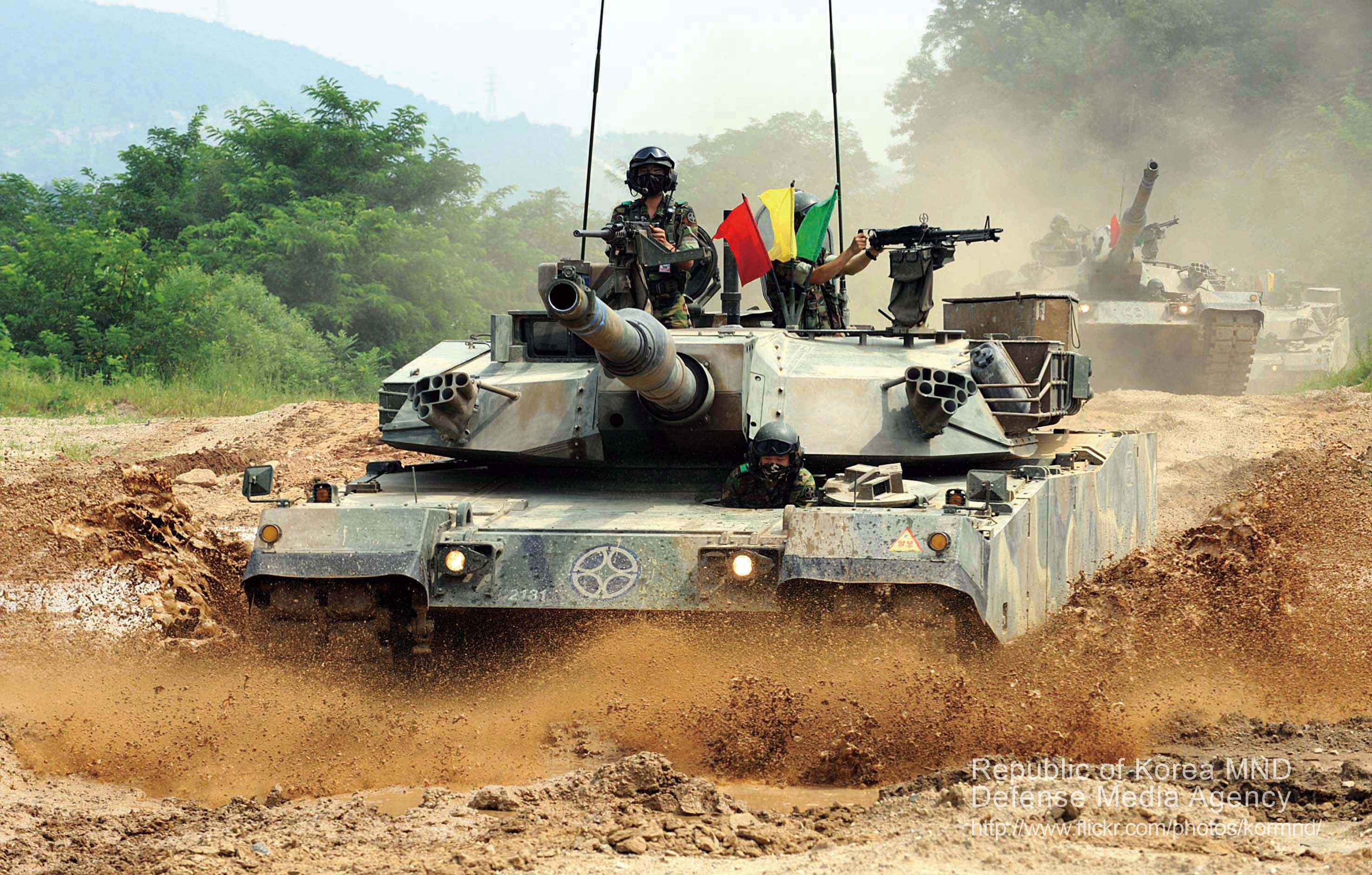
K1A1 tanks of the 20th Mechanized Infantry Division of ROK Army is maneuvering through rough terrain.

In 1985, South Korea exercised its option (included in the previous contract) for a K1 upgrade plan report. GDLS responded with an upgraded K1 model with a 120 mm smoothbore gun similar to the M1A1 Abrams gun. In the late 1980s, South Korea received multiple intelligence reports about North Korea purchasing T-72 tanks, which had a 125 mm smoothbore cannon. The intelligence report turned out to be false decades later. However, it alerted South Korea at that time as a 125 mm smoothbore could fire from a farther distance and have higher penetration compared to a 105 mm rifled cannon. Therefore, the South Korean government requested the ADD to make a new tank equipped with a 120 mm cannon. In 1988, the ADD launched exploration development, and began official system development with Hyundai Precision Industry in 1991.

The ADD and Hyundai submitted a plan to redesign the tank by replacing most parts with the latest technology. However, the plan was rejected by the military as such an upgrade would require a budget over the limit, and too luxurious for a conscription army. Therefore, the ADD and Hyundai changed the plan by focusing on the weaponry by increasing the caliber to 120 mm. Since South Korea did not know the specification of 120 mm cannon, it decided to compare the cannons from the United States, Germany, France, and Israel, while ammunition was competed between the United States, which was a German design, and Israel. On 10 March 1994, Poongsan Corporation was selected as the main supplier of the 120 mm tank ammunition. In September 1994, despite the Israeli IMI 120 mm gun showing better performance, easier logistics access made South Korea licence produce the American M256 120 mm smoothbore, which was based on German Rheinmetall Rh-120, as designation KM256. Meanwhile, on October 10, 1996, ADD announced that it would develop domestic 120 mm ammunition without receiving technology transfer from foreign countries.

On 7 October 1994, the ADD reported at a parliamentary inspection that the KGPS, fitted with a Raman laser rangefinder, was tested on the K1 and showed good performances. It was expected to be tested on an upgraded prototype in 1996.

The delivery ceremony of the K1A1 prototype was held on 3 April 1996. The major improvement was firepower, which increased the penetration from 300 mm to 600 mm and the effective range from 1.2 km to 2.5 km. South Korea expected to mass-produce the K1A1 in 1997. On 9 October, the ADD announced the development of the KGPS, which was developed by the technologies gained during the GPTTS upgrades.

On 9 June 1998, the Ministry of Defense announced that mass production of K1A1 would begin in 1999, 2 years behind schedule due to the 1997 Asian financial crisis that decreased the defense budget. On 15 November 1999, Hyundai Precision Industry signed an estimate of 1 trillion KRW contract to produce the K1A1. The first K1A1 release ceremony was held on 12 October 2001. The tank weighs 53.2 t and has a length of 9.71 m (gun forward), and each tank costs 4.4 billion KRW with 67% localization rate by value.

Unlike the K1, the newly upgraded design was made only by Korean engineers. Originally, GDLS wanted to participate in the K1 series to maintain its level of influence, and it proposed a partnership for the project due to concerns about Koreans lacking such skills. However, South Korean engineers declined the offer, and decided to take full responsibility on the project even if it failed, because they could learn about the main battle tank throughout the process and to maximize localization by reducing the technological reliance from GDLS. In the end, GDLS transferred the TDP, and sent a small team of engineers to South Korea for a 50-man-day contract, but the contract was never needed.

Despite the similar look, the K1A1 is made of completely different materials and carries more advanced subsystems. The K1A1 can easily be distinguished from the K1 by the shape of the gun, location of the co-axial machinegun, shape of the commander's sight, and overall angular shape of the turret (the K1A1 has more curved surfaces than the K1). The 120 mm smoothbore gun of the K1A1 is thicker than the K1's 105 mm rifled gun and has a thicker thermal sleeve a third of the way from the base of the gun. The co-axial machinegun on the K1A1 is located at a much higher point compared to the K1. The K1A1 also features a somewhat cone-shaped day/night KGPS compared to the day-only sight of the K1, which has a plain, tube-like appearance to it.

K1 & K1A1 comparison (1996)
Variants	K1 (early)	K1 (late)	K1A1
Main gun	KM68A1 105 mm rifled (47 rounds)		KM256 120 mm smoothbore (32 rounds)
Firepower (estimate)	K270 APFSDS, 300 mm penetration at 2.5 km		K276 APFSDS, 600 mm penetration at 2.5 km
Commander's sight	VS580-13		KCPS
Gunner's sight	GPSS	GPTTS	KGPS
Protection (estimate)	SAP 400–500 mm vs KE		KSAP 600 mm vs KE
Weight	51.1 t	51.5 t	53.2 t

==== Firepower ====
The most important upgrade was switching the main gun from a 105 mm KM68A1 rifled (47 rounds) to a 120 mm KM256 smoothbore (32 rounds), which is produced under license by Hyundai Precision Industry (now Hyundai WIA), mounted on the domestically upgraded turret. In addition, South Korea began to deploy K276 120 mm armor-piercing fin-stabilized discarding sabot (APFSDS) ammunition with the most sophisticated tungsten heavy alloy penetrators during that time, created after several technological breakthroughs that were new to the world. Benefiting from domestic tungsten processing technologies from abundant deposits, (Note: In South Korea's Gangwon province, there is the Sangdong Mine, the world's largest tungsten mine.) Korean engineers invented a self-sharpening process on the tungsten heavy alloy (a process which in the past was only achievable for depleted uranium (DU) penetrators) by applying microstructure control and multi-stage cyclic heat treatment. The self-sharpening process was developed over four years between 1990 and 1993 with a 1.1 billion KRW budget. Most penetrators in the world receive a single heat treatment, while South Korean penetrators are treated 20 times using the new technology, which increases impact toughness by 300%. The self-sharpening effect increases penetration by 8–16% compared to regular penetrators, and compensates for tungsten's previous material disadvantage against DU: without the new technology, a tungsten penetrator has 6–10% less penetration than a DU penetrator. Thus, the new technology provides firepower like of that of DU ammunition without the disadvantage of toxic DU particles. South Korea holds related patents on 6 other nations including Japan, the United Kingdom, and the United States, (Note: Three other nations are yet unspecified, but it was likely the major manufacturers during that time, which includes France, Germany, and Israel.) and the penetrator manufacturing technology was on the U.S. Army Science and Technology Master Plan (ASTMP) in 1997 and 1998 as a technology to acquire from outside the United States. Later, In 2009, the U.S. negotiated with the South Korean government to introduce penetrator technology, but the negotiations did not progress further because South Korea wanted to export only the finished products of the penetrator technology through the U.S. Army's Foreign Comparative Testing (FCT) (Note: The Foreign Comparative Testing (FCT) is one of the U.S. Department of Defense's procurement programs introduced in 1989 to supply superior overseas items or technologies that are not produced in the United States more quickly and economically.) program.

==== Electronics and sensors ====
The systems were upgraded from 16-bit to 32-bit and were designed using upgraded computers including 32-bit digital ballistic calculators.

The new gunner's sight KGPS consists of a stabilization device that allows better accuracy for aiming and shooting during maneuvers, a thermal imaging device and a daytime optical device for night and day observation and a laser rangefinder that measures the range of the captured target. The sharpness and magnification of the thermal imager and daytime optical system have been increased, making it possible to observe and identify the target from a greater distance. In particular, the screen display method of the thermal imager has been improved for enhanced night combat capability. The laser rangefinder uses an eye-safe Raman laser, which gives excellent distance measurement ability while providing crew safety during crew training. In addition, the sight has a recording feature for the gunner to check the location of the aiming point during actual shooting or non-shooting training, enhancing the training effect and verifying the results. The thermal imaging device can be operated independently for convenience, thus allowing the tank to shoot even if the imager malfunctions. The daytime optical system image is displayed in natural color, making it convenient to observe. The power consumption is reduced by about 40% compared to the previous model, which increases operational time with the engine off to maximize stealth kill. It has a daytime magnification of 1 to 10 times and a far-infrared thermal magnification of 3 to 10 times.

The new commander's sight KCPS (Korean Commander's Panoramic Sight) was developed in 1999 and has a thermal sight for night operation. However, both the KGPS and KCPS heavily rely on foreign parts and were reported to have an average localization rate of 27.6% in the year 2004.

==== Protection ====
The SAP was changed to a more protective Korean Special Armor Plate (KSAP) as well as switching American RHA to South Korean domestic armor steel. Although the exact specification is classified, it was reported that the KSAP provides a protection level of 600 mm against KE ammunition for frontal armor. In addition, the exterior of the K1A1 has nuts that were not seen on the K1, hinting at a structural difference from the previous version. This is different from the way Americans installed and welded the SAP directly to prevent Koreans from technically accessing the armor during the K1 production. (Note: Later produced batch of the K1 also shows nuts on the exterior, but there is no direct evidence of changing armor type.) Moreover, a captain of the ROK Army Armor School mentioned the combination of explosive reactive armor (ERA) with composite material being used for the armor of the K1A1. In 1996, South Korea acquired a 1,250 hp variant of the Russian domestic specification T-80U tank along with Kontakt-5 ERAs, and the T-80U contributed to developing South Korean domestic ERAs and enhancing armor technology. Therefore, based on the available sources, the K1A1 is fitted with domestic armor, in which the technology has influence from the American M1 Abrams and the Russian T-80U, and ERAs are located behind the outer shell of the tank.

==== Mobility ====
Both the torsion bar and hydropneumatic suspension were enhanced to withstand the recoil of the new 120 mm cannon. The vehicle can move at a speed of 65 km/h.

=== K1A2 ===
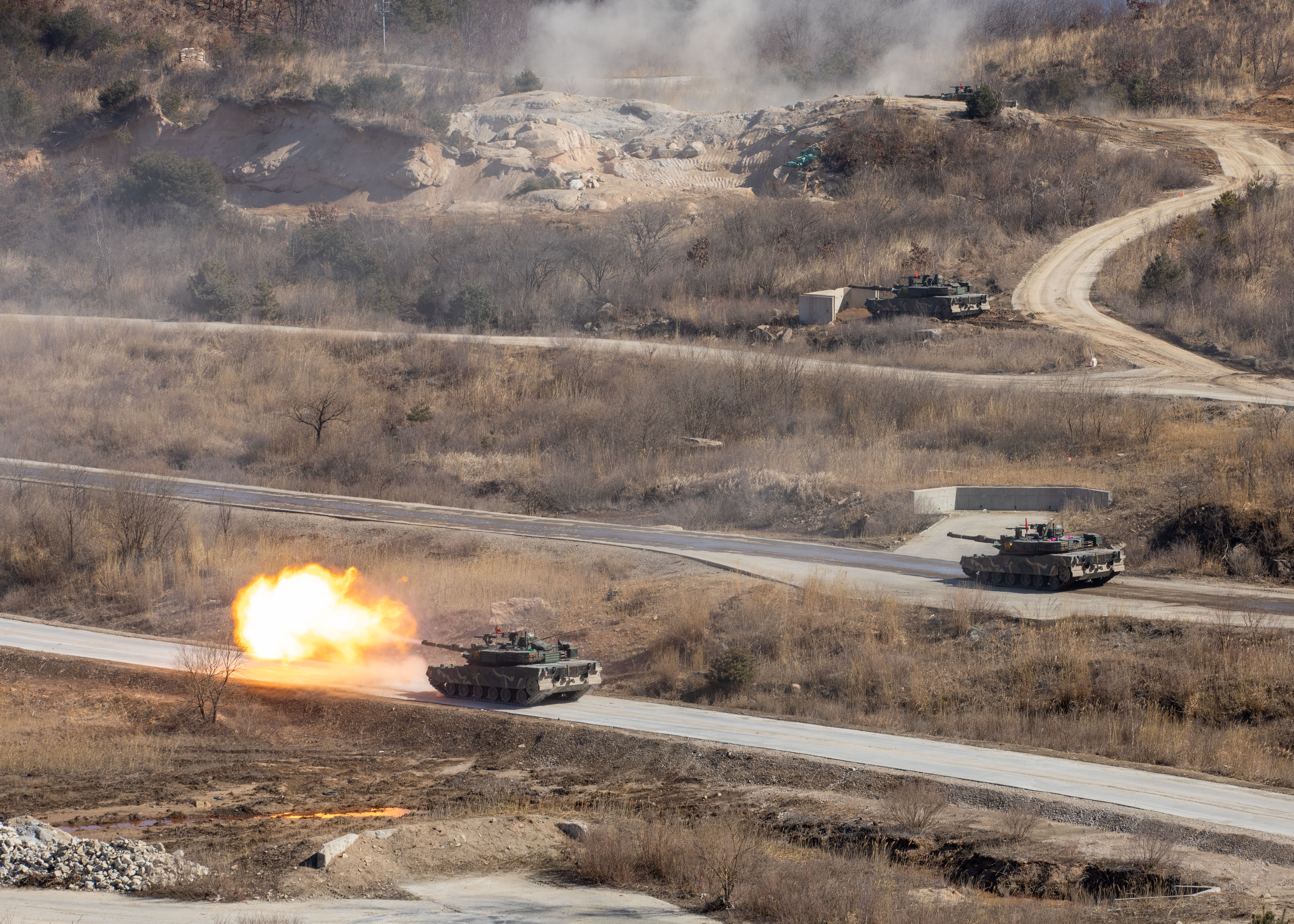
ROK Army K1A2 Tank platoons to designated firing points during an integrated firepower training exercise

In 2007, the Joint Chiefs of Staff, the Army, and Hyundai Rotem planned to develop an upgrade model of the K1A1 by installing C4I network-centric warfare capability by 2011. On 22 September 2008, the Defense Acquisition Program Promotion Committee approved the K1A1 upgrade plan to install a battlefield management system, identification friend or foe, driver's thermal sight, and front and rear surveillance cameras. The upgraded K1A1 tank is expected to increase cooperative combat capabilities with the next generation tanks and K21 infantry fighting vehicles through improved all-weather combat capabilities and battlefield information sharing functions. However, the JCS cut the air conditioner budget by 100% to reduce the defense budget by sacrificing the welfare of the soldiers, which was heavily criticized as the air conditioner is a part of the positive pressure system that allows tank crews to operate in contaminated zones without wearing a gas mask. The military plans to upgrade the entire fleet by 2022 with an estimated budget of ₩139.4 billion.

The K1A2 prototype was revealed to public during 2012 Ground Forces Festival. The first rollout ceremony was held on 20 December 2013.

On 12 September 2024, the Defense Acquisition Program Administration (DAPA) announced the completion of the K1A2 program and the achievement of full operational capability. The K1A2 was produced in four batches. The installation of a battlefield management system improved the previous analog communication to a digital form which has enabled digital map-based information sharing and visualization of battlefield situations for K1A2 crews. By applying the ground tactical data link (KVMF), a standardized specialized transmission and reception system, the tanks will be able to exchange tactical information between ground weapon systems quickly and accurately.

=== K1E1 ===
The K1E1 is an upgraded K1 with an enhancement package similar to the K1A2 for network-centric warfare capability. The military plans to upgrade the entire fleet by 2026 with an estimated budget of ₩146.9 billion. The first rollout ceremony was held on 7 July 2014.

== Operational history ==
On 19 June 1995, the United States and South Korea agreed upon exporting the K1 to third countries during defense talks. The price of the K1 was adjusted to ₩2.8 billion in 1995. (Note: Presumably batch 3 price.)

In March 1996, LG Cable developed the K1 MBT detachable pad track to replace the locally produced American M88A1 integral pad track.

On 7 June 1999, Hyundai Precision Industry announced to co-develop the K1 tank simulator for weaponry with the ADD to lower the training cost. On 19 February 2001, Hyundai Mobis (formerly Hyundai Precision Industry) announced that the simulator was completed and supplied to the military on 19 February 2001. Simulators are expected to decrease training costs from 20 billion KRW to 1.4 billion KRW per 1,000 trainees every year.

On 28 October 1999, Samsung Electronics and Thomson-CSF agreed to create a joint venture with each company investing and holding 50% of the shares. Thomson-CSF will receive technology transfer of Samsung's defense products such as communication equipment, satellite communication systems, and terminals, fire control systems, detection and tracking devices, radar guidance equipment, and gunner's sight (KGPS), while Samsung will gain access to Thomson-CSF's network for overseas exports. In February 2000, Samsung Thomson-CSF was created, and it was renamed Samsung Thales on 26 February 2001.

On 27 February 2003, Ssang Yong Information and the ADD developed an IETM (interactive electronic technical manual) in four CD-ROMs that contain twenty books of a technical manual for the K1A1 using domestically developed software for the first time. On 26 September, the ADD announced the development of insensitive gunpower that does not explode in shock, fire, or heat that can occur in the transport, storage, and operation of warheads and ammunition.

In September 2003, Typhoon Maemi caused seawater damage to the domestic circular cooler prototype for K1 tanks and its test and evaluation facilities at Hanjo Company in Busan. The STX engine, which had joined with Hanjo to localize core components since 2002, also dispatched a team to recover the sight and requested an extension of the project to the Ministry of Defense as the due date was only six months away. Eventually, two companies restored damages in three months and completed product development in January 2004. The localized circular cooler costs 26 million KRW, less than the import variant, which costs 43 million KRW.

On 21 October 2004, it was revealed that South Korea was developing depleted uranium tank munitions between 1983 and 1987. South Korea eventually halted the development after the United States learned about the project in 1987.

In March 2005, LS Cable (formerly LG Cable) developed the K1A1 MBT detachable pad track to replace the previous generation model for both K1 and K1A1.

On 26 June 2008, the Defense Acquisition Program Promotion Committee approved mass production of the KCPS for K1 tanks until 2014 to provide thermal sight for tank commanders.

On 19 March 2009, the STX Engine and the MTU signed a MOU to transfer the ownership of the MB871Ka-501 diesel engine. The STX Engine had achieved 80% localization rate prior to the MOU, and gained right to manufacture, maintain, and sell the engine.

On 6 September 2009, North Korea released the floodgates of Hwanggang Dam at dawn without warning, leaving six South Korean civilians missing and one K1 tank trapped in the swollen river, which was rescued after hours.

On 23 October 2009, i3system, inc. developed a domestic infrared detector after 3 years of research. The infrared detector detects infrared rays emitted from an object even when there is no light and converts them into a two-dimensional image signal of 320×240 pixels. Until now, infrared detectors have only been produced in five countries, including the U.S. and France, and have been expensive equipment costing 25 million KRW each. Infrared detectors were tested and determined to be suitable for military use in April and May and will be deployed to K1 tank thermal sights and artillery observation equipment from 2010, and will be applied to guided weapons and K21 IFV sights afterward.

On 6 August 2010, during a live firing exercise at Paju, a round exploded in the barrel of a K1's 105 mm gun, destroying the gun but leaving the crew uninjured. It was the ninth incident since the operation of the K1 tanks: 1985 (1, XK1), 1987 (2), 1991 (1), 1994 (1), 2002 (1), 2009 (2), and 2010 (1), of which the previous eight were caused by foreign substances within the barrel according to the Agency for Defense Development, the Defense Agency for Technology and Quality, and the manufacture. However, the Army reinvestigated and claimed the August 2009 incident was due to fatigue failure caused by long usage of the barrel, which is a human error for failing inspection. On 19 November, the investigation team concluded that the August 2010 barrel burst was caused by the tensile residual stress remaining in the metal during the processing stage and a long period of use and exposure to corroded environments such as humidity, oxygen, and temperature. Therefore, the Army will conduct a detailed inspection of all K1 tank guns, use specialized tools to conduct preliminary inspections, and carry out the procedure for barrel cleaning before firing. In the long run, the Army will request external agencies to establish the acceptance criteria for microcracks and manage the cannon production process more thoroughly.

On 15 September, the Ministry of Defense revealed that the LSG 3000 transmission used for the K1 and the K1A1 has defects, and the production of the K1A1 has been suspended since February and expects a delay of one year until fixing the problem. In 2005, the Army checked 1,329 vehicles and found 102 with defective transmissions caused by iron powder and broken gear pieces in transmission oil. 77 vehicles with minor problems were fixed at the base while 25 vehicles with major issues had to be repaired at the maintenance depot. The initial solution was to install magnetic drainage plugs and oil drainage ports to collect iron powders but did not fix the source of the problem. Between 2005 and 2010, 189 additional vehicles were repaired after experiencing same transmission problem. On 30 December 2010, the Defense Acquisition Program Promotion Committee resumed the production of the K1A1 before the transmission durability test results, with a condition for recalling all vehicles if found to be manufacturer's fault, due to changes in national security situation. In April 2011, the Korea Institute of Machinery and Materials, which conducted durability tests of the K1A1 tank since June 2010, concluded that the right output bearing and fan housing were damaged during the basic steering durability test due to a design defect in the transmission itself.

On 31 March 2011, the Army found an issue with 95 K1A1s with domestic fire detector, which replaced American counterpart that suspended production, activating fire extinguishing system when the tank fires to its left side. It was due to its excessive sensitivity (5 meters) that detected flame from gunfire, so the manufacturer adjusted to the American detector standard (2.5 meters).

The ROK Marine Corps sent four K1s for Cobra Gold 2016, making it the first overseas deployment of the K1 tank.

In December 2020, the ADD commenced a program to develop unmanned versions of the K1 tank and K9 Thunder. Hyundai Rotem was contracted to develop the unmanned tank by 2024.

== Exports ==
=== Failed bids ===
==== Malaysia ====
Hyundai Precision Industry planned to sell 70 tanks to Malaysia. The K1 was displayed in Malaysia at DSA 1996 on 23–26 April 1996. To suit the jungle environment of Malaysia, Hyundai suggested a 47.9 t variant K1M based on the K1; the tank carries a total of 41 rounds and is equipped with KGPS for the gunner's sight and an overpressure device for CBRN protection. The K1 competed against the Polish PT-91 Twardy of Bumar-Labedy and Ukrainian T-84 of KMDB. Initially, the K1 was favored by Malaysia, but the high price and Malaysia's economic crisis caused by the 1997 Asian financial crisis led to the selection of the Polish PT-91.

== Variants and upgrades ==
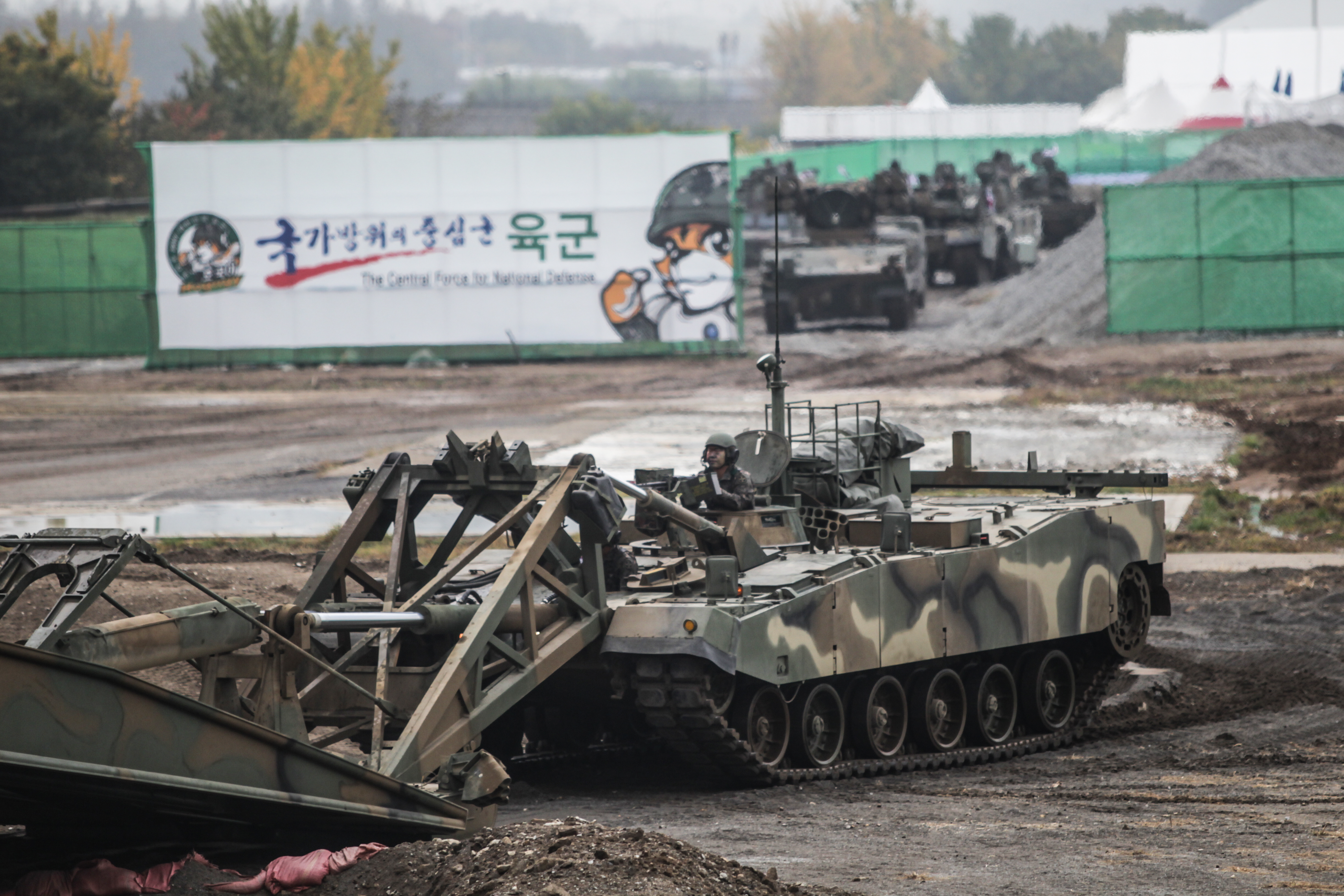
A South Korean K1 AVLB deploying its bridge

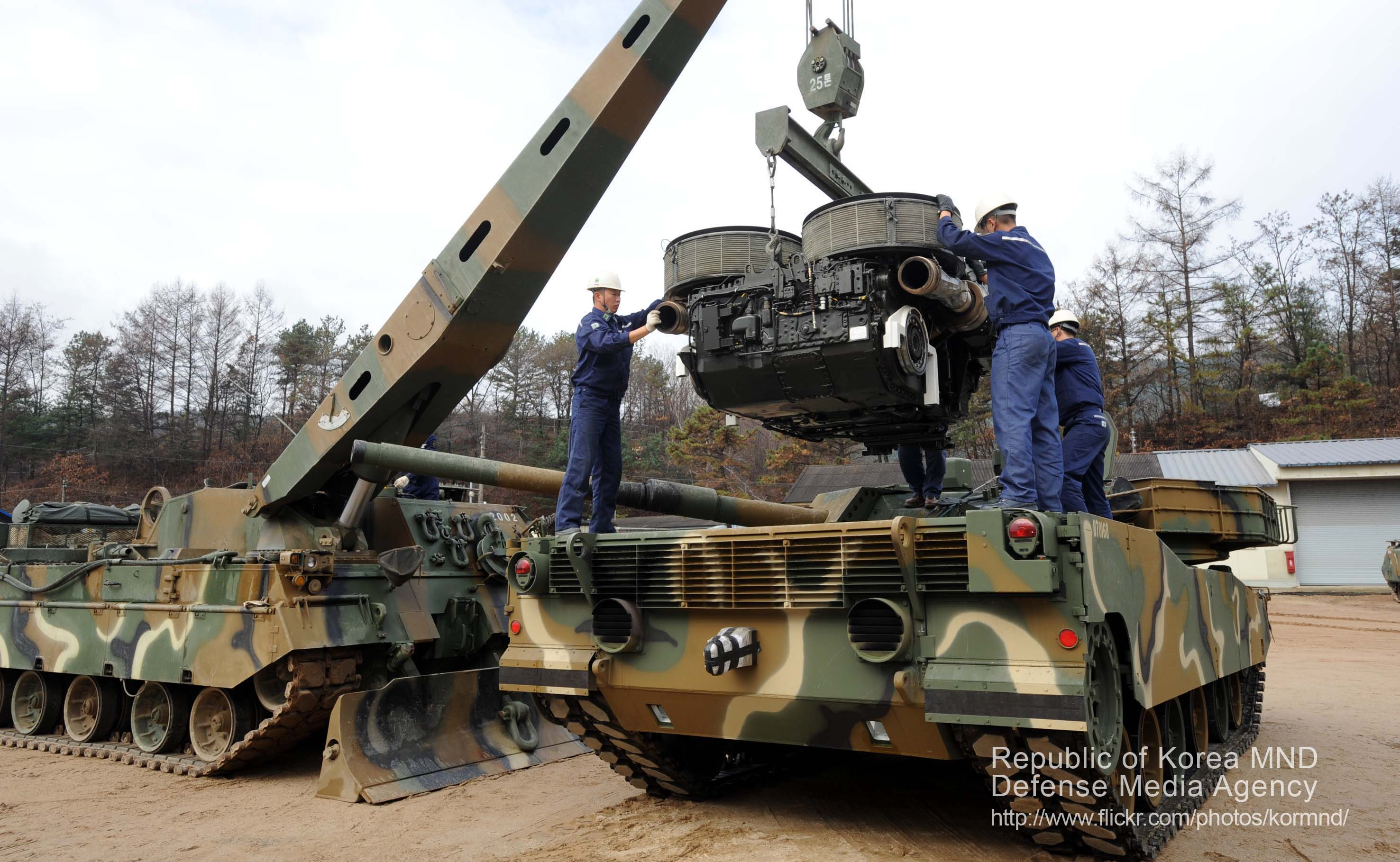
The K1 ARV being in use when replacing a tank engine

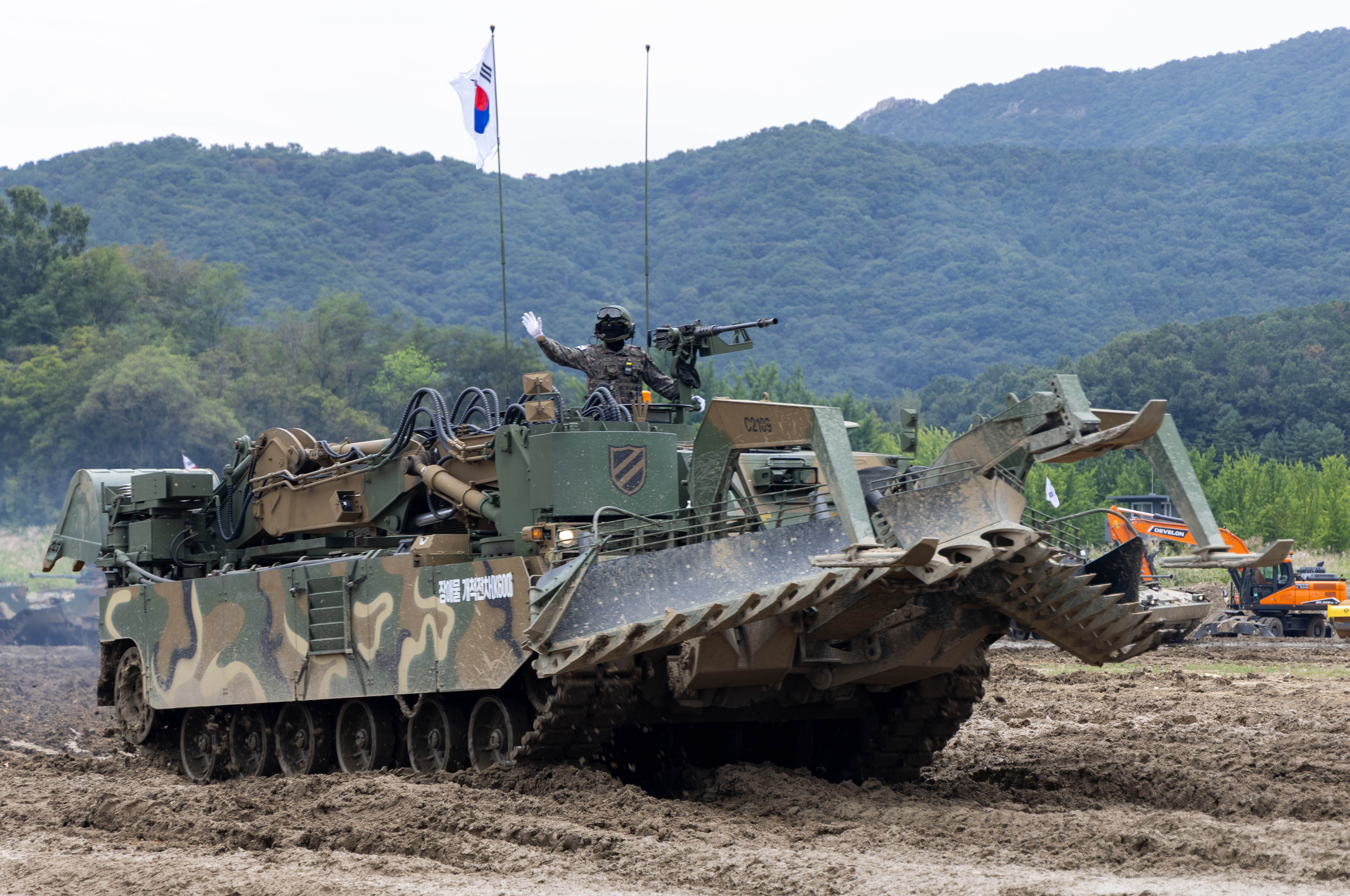
A K600 Rhino CEV in rough terrain

- XK1 ROKIT: Acronym for the Republic of Korea Indigenous Tank. Two experimental prototypes (PV-1 and PV-2) were produced by General Dynamics Land Systems.
- XK1: Preproduction prototype by Hyundai Precision Industry. 5 vehicles were produced, and entered service in 1986.
- K1: First production variant. 1,027 units built between 1987 and 1997 (445 with GPSS and 582 with GPTTS) in 3 batches. To be upgraded to K1E1 by 2026.
  - K1M: Proposed export variant for Malaysia.
  - K1 PIP: Replaced VS580-13 with KCPS.
    - K1E1: Further upgraded K1. Production began in December 2013, and the first K1E1 rolled out on 7 July 2014. The upgrade will be similar to that of K1A2. All K1 will be upgraded to K1E1 by 2026. The name was inherited from the K1A1 prototype, the K1E1.
    - K1E2: As of August 2018, the K1E2 type is planned to be improved. It is expected to be upgraded to a large-scale repair (renovation) in 2024. The main improvement point is the replacement of the new armored upgrading of the protection, installation of the positive pressure device, acceleration of 10% upgrade (1200 hp engine to 1320 hp) or change 1500 hp engine, Introduction of RWS, etc.
- K1A1: First major enhanced variant. 484 units built between 1999 and 2011 in 2 batches. All vehicles received A2 upgrade as of September 2024.
  - K1A2: Upgraded K1A1. Originally named as K1A1 PIP. Developed from 2008 to 2010, and mass-production started in 2012. First upgraded vehicle was rolled out on 20 December 2013. Technology benefit from K2 Black Panther has been applied to this model. It features additional systems such as a battlefield control system, IFF system, front and rear surveillance camera and navigation system. With its improved real-time information sharing, inter-combat vehicle operation, friendly fire prevention and driver operability.
    - K1A2 PIP: Upgraded K1A2. Positive pressure devices and air conditioning, soft-kill active protection systems have been added.
- K1 ARV: The K1 Armored Recovery Vehicle is based on the K1 tank. It has a crane, winch and dozer system built on the vehicle. It was developed with assistance from Krupp Maschinenbau Kiel GmbH (now Rheinmetall Landsysteme GmbH) between 1988 and 1992, with first deployment in 1993.
- K1 AVLB: The K1 Armoured Vehicle-Launched Bridge variant uses a scissor-type bridge system mounted on the chassis. It was developed from 1988 to 1992 with help from Vickers Defense Systems.
- K600 Rhino CEV: The K1 Combat Engineer Vehicle is based on the K1A1/A2 chassis, mounting a mine plough, an excavator arm on the right side, and a lane marking system. Development is expected to be completed in June 2018 and begin production in 2019.

== Operators ==
Map of operators of K1 or its variants

=== Current operators ===
South Korea

- Republic of Korea Armed Forces – Received 1,027 K1 between 1987 and 1997, and 484 K1A1 between 1999 and 2011. All K1/K1A1 are being upgraded to K1E1/K1A2 variants.
  - Republic of Korea Army
  - Republic of Korea Marine Corps

== See also ==
- List of main battle tanks by generation
- List of main battle tanks by country
