= M256 (tank gun) =

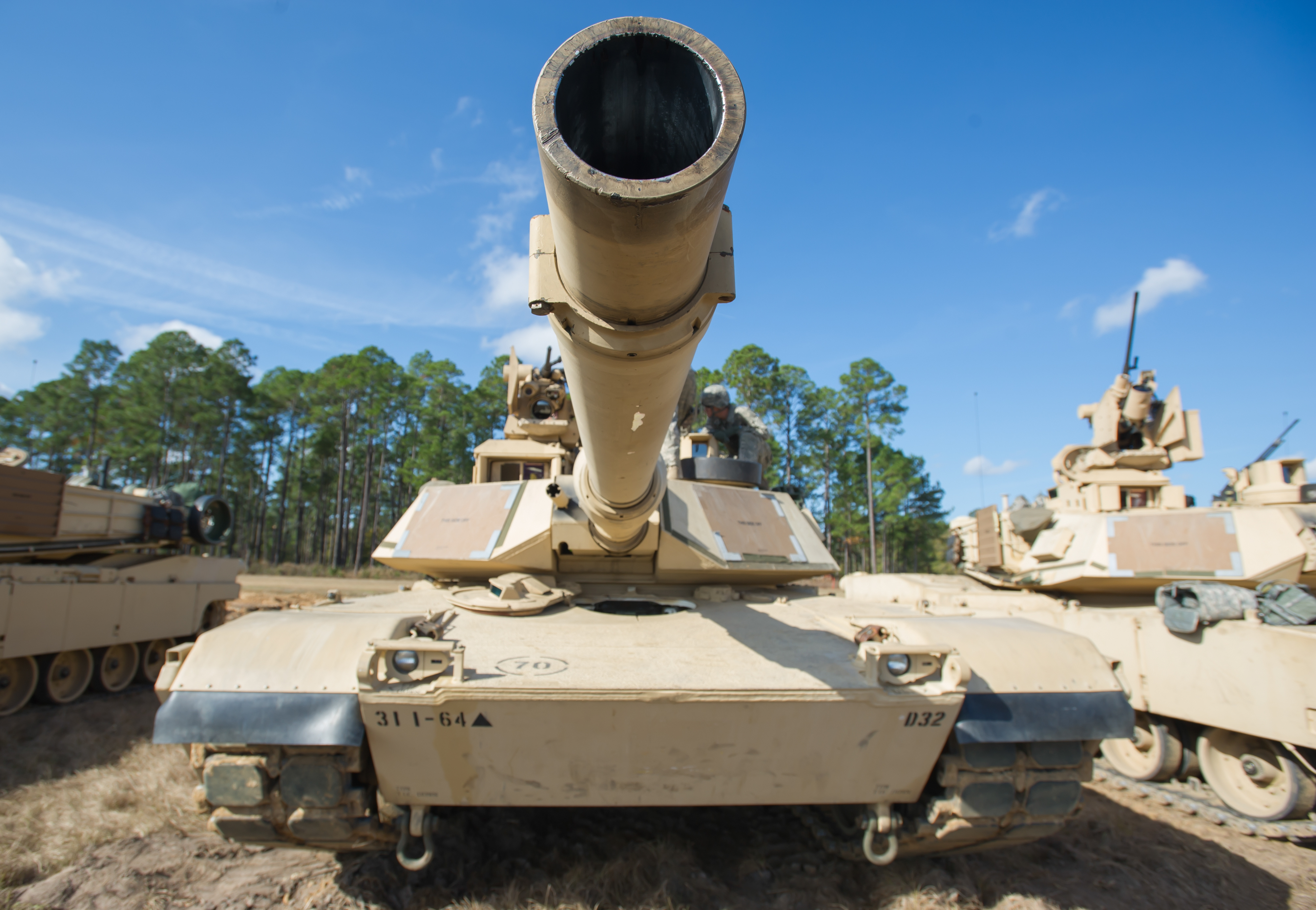
- Front view of a M256 gun on an American M1A2 SEP main battle tank during a gunnery exercise at Red Cloud Range, 2013.
- Type: Tank gun
- Place of origin: United States; Germany

Service history
- In service: 1985–present

Production history
- Designer: Rheinmetall; Watervliet Arsenal
- Manufacturer: Watervliet Arsenal
- Produced: 1985–present
- Variants: XM256, KM256, M256E1

Specifications
- Mass: 1,175 kg (2,590 lb) (gun tube); 1,905 kg (4,200 lb) (recoiling gun mass)
- Length: 5,593 mm (220.20 in) (overall)
- Barrel length: 5,300 mm (208.66 in) (gun tube)
- Shell: 120×570mm
- Calibre: 120 mm (4.724 in)
- Breech: semi-automatic vertical sliding-breechblock
- Recoil: 304.8 mm (12.000 in)

The M256 is an American 120 mm smoothbore tank gun. It is a Rheinmetall Rh-120 L44 gun tube produced under licence with an American-designed mount, cradle and recoil mechanism. It is primarily used by the M1 Abrams main battle tank.

== Origins ==
A number of considerations had led the U.S. Army and its contractors to favor the Army's standard M68 105 mm gun over Germany's 120 mm Rheinmetall Rh-120 smoothbore gun for the XM1 Abrams. To begin with, the 105 mm gun was "the smallest, lightest, and least costly gun adequate for the job." Indeed, new kinetic energy ammunition for the weapon then under development by the Army promised to extend the gun's usefulness well into the future. And because the Army's other tanks, the M60 and the upgraded M48, as well as the tanks of virtually every other NATO nation, used the 105 mm gun, mounting that gun on the XM1 promised to increase standardization within the alliance. Moreover, the continuing development of the new ammunition for the XM1 would in effect automatically upgrade every other gun in NATO. For all of these reasons, the XM1's development proceeded "on the assumption that the 105 mm gun would probably be the eventual main armament." The tripartite British–American–German gun trials of 1975 produced a general agreement in the U.S. Defense Department that at some future point, a 120 mm gun of some design would be added to the XM1. Anticipating this, Chrysler and GM had both made changes to their tanks during development to make them compatible with a variety of main guns. After head-to-head testing between the Royal Ordnance L11A5 and the Rheinmetall Rh-120, the Secretary of the Army announced in January 1978, that the Rheinmetall 120 mm gun would be mounted on future production versions of the XM1. Although the L11/M256 120mm gun was chosen to be the main weapon of the Abrams in 1979, the improved ammunition for the gun still was not fully developed, thus delaying its fielding until 1984. A license was obtained for its manufacture at Watervliet Arsenal at Watervliet, New York. From October 1980 to September 1981, Watervliet Arsenal fabricated eight XM256 cannons and fourteen spare tubes.

According to American tank historian Jim Warford, in retrospect, American intelligence underrated the effectiveness of Soviet armor. 105 mm guns were a poor match for Soviet tanks.

== Technical characteristics ==
The M256 differs from the Rh-120 L44 in several aspects :

- The M256 uses a concentric recoil spring instead of a separate buffer and recuperator hydraulic cylinders.
- The M256 features a cylinder-shaped cradle adapted to the recoil spring and Abrams gun rotor.

== Variants ==
=== XM256 ===
M256 designation when tested on the M1E1.

=== KM256 ===
Licence-produced variant of the US M256 gun for the Republic of Korea Army. Used on the South Korean variant of the K1A1 and K1A2.

== Usage ==
- K1: used on K1A1 and K1A2 variants
- M1 Abrams: used on M1A1 and M1A2 variants
- M60-2000: upgrade proposed by General Dynamics Land Systems.
- M60A3 SLEP: upgrade proposed by Raytheon.

== Operators ==
=== Current operators ===
- Australia – Australian Army
- Egypt – Egyptian Army
- Iraq – Iraqi Army
- Kuwait – Kuwaiti Army
- Poland – Polish Land Forces
- South Korea – Republic of Korea Army
- Saudi Arabia – Royal Saudi Land Forces
- Morocco – Royal Moroccan Army
- Taiwan – Republic of China Army
- United States – United States Army
- Ukraine – Ukrainian Ground Forces

=== Future operators ===
- Romania – Romanian Land Forces

== See also ==
- CN08 (South Korean counterpart)
- CN120-26 (French counterpart)
- IMI 120 mm (Israeli counterpart)
- MKE 120 mm (Turkish counterpart)
- L30A1 (British counterpart)
- 2A46M (Soviet 125 mm counterpart)

== Bibliography ==
- Information Spectrum (July 15, 1983). Lessons Learned M1 Tank System (Report).
- McNaugher, Thomas L. (August 1981). "Collaborative Development of Main Battle Tanks: Lessons From the U.S.-German Experience, 1963–1978" (PDF). Rand Corporation.
