= 120×570mm NATO =

Calibre of tank ammunition

120×570mm NATO tank ammunition
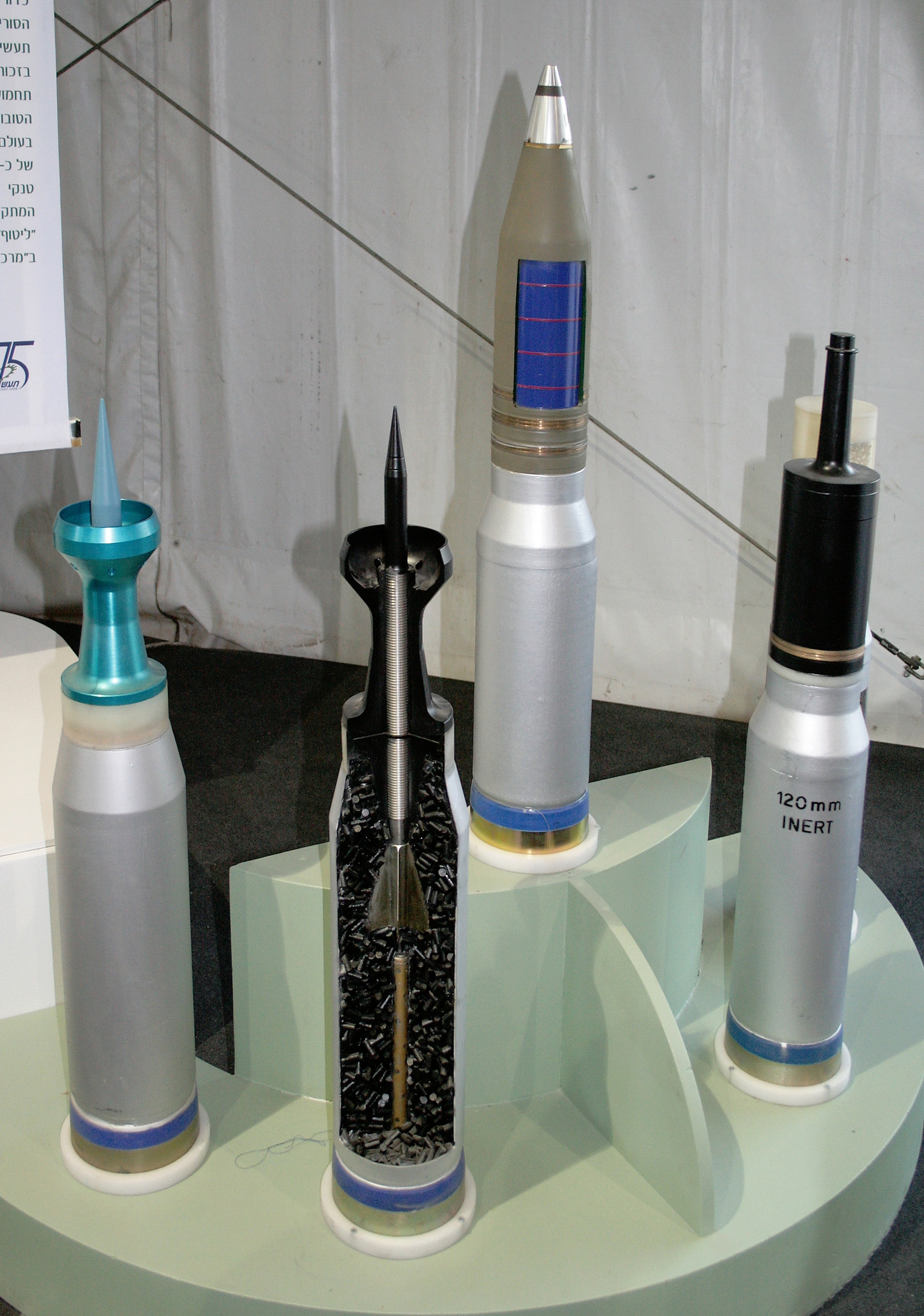
- 120×570mm ammunition manufactured by IMI Systems
- Type: Tank gun ammunition
- Place of origin: West Germany

Service history
- In service: 1979–present
- Used by: Western Bloc and others

Production history
- Designed: early 1970s

Specifications
- Case type: Rimmed, bottleneck
- Bullet diameter: 120 mm (4.7 in)
- Base diameter: 160 mm (6.3 in)
- Rim diameter: 169 mm (6.7 in)
- Case length: 570 mm (22 in)
- Overall length: 984 mm (38.7 in)
- Rifling twist: none
- Primer type: electric

120×570mm NATO tank ammunition (4.7 inch), also known as 120×570mmR, is a common, NATO-standard (STANAG 4385), tank gun semi-combustible cartridge used by 120mm smoothbore guns, superseding the earlier 105×617mmR cartridge used in NATO-standard rifled tank guns.

== History ==
The 120×570 R cartridge was originally intended for the German Rh-120 smoothbore gun but an interoperability agreement signed between West Germany and France in April 1979, followed in September 1981 by a project to install the M256 120 mm smoothbore gun on future M1A1 Abrams tanks made it a NATO standard.

== Characteristics ==
The 120×570mm are one-piece ammunition with semi-combustible cartridge cases. These incorporate a short, metallic stub case with an elastomeric sealing ring which allows the use of a normal sliding wedge type of breech and at the same time significantly reduces the weight of the rounds. Thus, a round of 120 mm Rheinmetall APFSDS ammunition has a mass of 19.8 kg, which is little more than the 18 kg mass of a typical 105 mm APFSDS round with the traditional metallic cartridge case.

== Ammunition ==
=== Armour-Piercing Fin-Stabilized Discarding Sabot (APFSDS) ===
Designation	Origin	Designer & producer	Year	Cartridge length (mm)	Sub-projectile length (mm)	Penetrator dimension (⌀ mm × mm)	L/D ratio (sub-projectile / penetrator only)	Penetrator material & weight (kg)	Sub-projectile weight with sabot / without sabot (kg)	Weight, complete round (kg)	Propellant type & weight	Chamber pressure (MPa)	Muzzle velocity (m/s)	Velocity drop (m/s at m)	Perforation at normal and oblique incidences	Notes
DM13	Germany	Rheinmetall	1979	888 mm	457.7 mm	⌀ 38-26 × 315 mm	8:1	Tungsten alloy	7.22 kg / 4.64 kg	18.7 kg	7.3 kg	510 MPa	1650 m/s (L/44)	75 m/s (at 1000 m)	NATO single heavy target at 68° at 2000 m	
OFL 120 G1	France	GIAT	1981	977 mm	541.5 mm	⌀ 26 mm × 375 mm	14.4:1	18 density DENAL DX 130 R tungsten alloy	6.2 kg / 3.78 kg	18.75 kg	7.45 kg of B19T	416 MPa	1630 m/s (1981); 1650 m/s (upgraded, 1987); 1780 m/s (Note: According to the markings (v0 1780) written on the cartridge of an OFL 120 G1 displayed at the Saumur Armored Museum.) (all L/52)	60 m/s (at 1000 m)	420 mm at 1000 m, defeat the NATO Single heavy target at 8000 m and the Triple heavy target at 7000 m or 8400 m	Use the same penetrator as the OFL 105 F1 105 mm APFSDS in a larger sabot. Upgraded with Israeli-style steel fins instead of aluminium in 1987.
DM23	Germany	Rheinmetall	1982	884 mm	457.7 mm	⌀ 32 × 360 mm	12:1	Tungsten alloy	7.2 kg / 4.3 kg or 4.6 kg		7.3 kg		1640 m/s or 1650 m/s (L/44)	56 m/s (at 1000 m) 111 m/s (at 1000 m)	420 mm at 2000 m	Produced under licence by Switzerland as Pfeil Pat 87
M829	USA	Alliant Techsystems	1984	935 mm	616 mm	⌀ 27 × 460 mm	23:1 / 17:1	Depleted uranium alloy, 3.94 kg	7.1 kg / 4.27 kg	18.7 kg	8.1 kg of JA-2 (double-base)	509 MPa	1670 m/s (L/44)	62 m/s (at 1000 m) 123 m/s (at 2000 m)	525 mm to 540 mm at 2000 m (LoS 60°)	Actual average diameter is around 24.2 mm, 27 mm is the maximum diameter of the buttress threads.
DM33	Germany	Rheinmetall	1987			⌀ 28 × 510 mm	20:1 / 19:1	Tungsten alloy	7.3 kg / 4.6 kg	19 kg	7.6 kg of 7-hole grain-type	515 MPa	1650 m/s (L/44)	75 m/s (at 1000 m); 120 m/s (at 2000 m)	480 mm at 2000 m	Produced under licence by Japan as JM33 and by Switzerland as Pfeil Pat 90
M829A1	USA	Alliant Techsystems	1988	984 mm	778 mm	⌀ 21.6 × 680 mm	35:1 / 31:1	Depleted Uranium alloy, 4.64 kg	8.165 kg / 4.88 kg	20.9 kg	7.9 kg of JA-2 (double-base)	560 MPa (5,600 bar) or 569 MPa (5,690 bar)	1575 m/s (L/44)	69 m/s (at 1000 m) 135 m/s (at 2000 m)	650 mm at 2000 m (LoS at 60°)	Nicknamed the "silver bullet" by US tank crews in Operation Desert Storm.
KE-T	USA	Alliant Techsystems	1988	983 mm	658 mm			Tungsten alloy	7.16 kg / 4 kg	18.7 kg	8.1 kg of JA-2 (double-base)	510 MPa	1690 m/s			Developed by Alliant Techsystems, NWM de Kruithoorn of the Netherlands for the penetrator and Chamberlain Manufacturing Company of the USA who provided the sabots, fins and projectile assembly facility.
M321	Israel	Elbit Systems	1989	936 mm				Tungsten alloy		approx. 20 kg	approx. 8 kg of M26 (double-base)		1650 m/s (L/44)			M321 penetrator was later re-used on the 105 mm M426 APFSDS in 1990.
M1080	Belgium	MECAR	early 1990s	995 mm		625 mm		Tungsten alloy	7.2 kg /	25 kg	approx 8 kg		1675 m/s		>540 mm of RHA at 0°	Features an advanced-design tungsten penetrator. In 1995, the firm began development of an enhanced version of the M1080 which became available in 1999.
M322	Israel	Elbit Systems	1990s	984 mm				Tungsten alloy	8 kg / 5.6 kg	20 kg	8 kg of NC-NG (double-base)		1705 m/s (L/44)	130 m/s (at 2000 m)	658 mm at 70° at 2000 m	Produced under licence by Turkey as MOD 290. Also known as CL-3143 (Italy) and Slpprj 95 (Sweden) on the export market.
DM43A1	France and Germany	Giat Industries and Rheinmetall	1992 or 1996	978 mm		⌀ 26 × 600 mm	27:1	Tungsten alloy	7.2 kg / 4 kg	19.5 kg or 20 kg	7.6 kg of L1 M (double-base)	550 MPa or 560 MPa	1740 m/s (L/44)	100 m/s (at 2000 m)	560 mm at 2000 m	French-German development, never adopted by the Bundeswehr and used in the French Army under the OFL 120 F1 designation.
OFL 120 F1	France and Germany	Giat Industries and Rheinmetall	1992 or 1994	984 mm		⌀ 26 × 600 mm	27:1	Tungsten alloy	7.3 kg / 4 kg	19.6 kg	8.3 kg	580 MPa	1790 m/s (L/52)	100 m/s (at 2000 m)	560 mm at 2000 m	Feature the same penetrator as the DM43 but use a French propellant, later redesignated as 120 OFLE F1A. Late production, upgraded models are known under the 120 OFLE F1B and 120 OFLE F1B+ designations.
M829A2	USA	General Dynamics Ordnance and Tactical Systems	1994		780 mm	⌀ 21.6 × 695 mm	35:1 / 32:1	Depleted Uranium alloy, 4.74 kg	7.9 kg / 4.92 kg		8.7 kg of JA-2 (double-base)	565 MPa or 580 MPa	1680 m/s (L/44)	60 m/s (at 1000 m); 120 m/s (at 2000 m)		Improvements over M829A1 include a stepped tip and use of a new lightweight composite Sabot, which allowed for increased muzzle velocity.
KE-W Terminator	USA	Olin Defense System Groups (Primex Technologies); General Dynamics Ordnanceand Tactical System (later)	1996	980 mm	778 mm	⌀ 21.6 × 680 mm	35:1 / 31:1	C2 Tungsten alloy 4.32 kg or 4.37 kg	8.2 kg / 4.6 kg	20.5 kg	7.91 kg of JA-2 (double-base)	496.6 MPa	1585 m/s (L/44)	60 m/s (at 1000 m)	in excess of 600 mm	US Export version of M829A1, features a Tungsten alloy penetrator instead of depleted uranium.
K276	South Korea	Poongsan Corporation	1996	973 mm	703.6 mm	600 mm	25:1	Tungsten alloy	7.35 kg /	19.7 kg	K683 (triple-base)	586 MPa	1700 m/s (L/44)		>600 mm (LoS at 60° obliquity) at 2000 m or 650 mm at 2000 m	Penetrators are manufactured by cyclic heat-treatment and double-cycle sintering process. This causes a phenomenon similar to the self-sharpening effect of the depleted uranium penetrator.
OFL 120 F2	France	Giat Industries	1996	984 mm		⌀ 27 × 594 mm	22:1 (penetrator)	Depleted Uranium alloy	7.78 kg / 4.5 kg	20.5 kg	8.1 kg	560 MPa	1740 m/s (L/52)		640 mm at 2000 m	Has superior penetration performance compared to the OFL 120 F1. 60 000 rounds were made from 1996 to 2000.
12 cm Pz Kann Pfeil Pat 98 Lsp	Germany/Switzerland	Rheinmetall DeTec/RUAG Ammotec	1999		745 mm		26:1	WSM 4-1 tungsten alloy		19 kg	8.9 kg of L1	545 MPa	1640 m/s (L/44)			First iteration of the DM53 purchased by the Swiss Army. Fitted with a tracer.
DM53	Germany	Rheinmetall	2001		745 mm	⌀ 26 × 685 mm	26:1	WSM 4-1 tungsten alloy	8.35 kg / 5 kg	21.4 kg	8.9 kg of L1 (DM53); 8.45 kg of L15190 SCDB (DM53A1)	545 MPa	1670 m/s (L/44); 1720 m/s (L/55)	55 m/s (at 1000 m); 110 m/s (at 2000 m)		Development in Germany continued after the Swiss purchase, the German DM53 round includes a minor geometric modification and the replacement of the tracer element with an incendiary cartridge to add behind-armour effect. The DM53A1 version differs from the DM53 by its SCDB propellant firstly introduced with the DM63.
KE-W A1	USA	General Dynamics Ordnance and Tactical Systems	1999 or 2000					Tungsten alloy	/ 4 kg		8.4 kg of L1/M2400 (double-base)	580 MPa	1740 m/s (L/44)	100 m/s (at 2000 m)		US export variant of the French-German DM43
M338	Israel	Elbit Systems		984 mm				Tungsten alloy		21 kg	8 kg of LOVA (double-base)		1680 m/s (L/44)			3rd generation Israeli APFSDS-T.
M829A3	USA	Alliant Techsystems (ATK), Armtech Defense, Aerojet GenCorp and Northrop Grumman	2003		924 mm	Main Rod ⌀ 25 x 670 mm Tip Section ⌀25 x 100 mm	37:1 / 31:1	Depleted Uranium alloy Main Rod with Tungsten Alloy Tip Section	10 kg / 7.2 kg		8.1 kg or 8.15 kg of RPD-380 sticks	566 MPa	1555 m/s (L/44)			Features an improved penetrator using a special tip assembly to overcome newer types of heavy ERA.
KEW-A2	USA	General Dynamics Ordnance and Tactical Systems	2003		780 mm	⌀ 21.6 × 695 mm	35:1 / 32:1	Tungsten-nickel-iron alloy	7.6 kg		8.6 kg of JA-2 (double-base)	580 MPa	1700 m/s (L/44)		660 mm at 2000 m	Export version of the M829A2 round, it features a tungsten penetrator
DM63	Germany	Rheinmetall	2005		745 mm		26:1	WSM 4-1 tungsten alloy	8.35 kg / 5 kg	21 kg	8.45 kg of L15190 SCDB	545 MPa	1650 m/s (L/44); 1720 m/s (L/55)	55 m/s (at 1000 m); 110 m/s (at 2000 m)		Based on the DM53, it features a Temperature Independent Propulsion System (TIPS) utilizing the SCDB technology. Those modifications improve the accuracy through a wide operational temperatures ensuring safe operation extreme climate zones, and minimizing the erosion of the barrel. The DM63A1 is a 2014 version of the DM63 designed to be compatible with all 120 mm smoothbore guns without modifications.
K279	South Korea	Poongsan Corporation	2008	998 mm	761.6 mm		27:1	Tungsten alloy	8.27 kg / 5 kg	21.3 kg	8.6 kg of L15190 (SCDB)		1760 m/s (L/55)	120 m/s (at 2000 m)	>700 mm (LoS at 60° obliquity) at 2000 m	The penetrator is manufactured of a composite material consisting of tungsten, nickel, iron, and molybdenum.
Type 10	Japan	DAIKIN, CHUGOKU-KAYAKU	2010			⌀ 24 mm × 630 mm	26:1	Tungsten alloy	7.8 kg / 4.2 kg				1780 m/s (L/44)			A Japanese APFSDS round only dedicated to Type 10 MBT. Although this is a NATO-standard round, it can only be used with the Type 10 Cannon due to the increased load and resulting increased pressure when fired.
120 OFLE F2	France	Nexter	2013					Depleted uranium alloy								Qualified in 2009, 3000 rounds ordered in 2010, 500 were to be delivered in 2013.
KET	USA	Orbital ATK	before 2015					Tungsten alloy	9.67 kg		8.1 kg of RPD-380 or SCDB		1562 m/s			Not to be confused with the older KE-T from Alliant Techsystems, the KET features a lightweight composite sabot, consistent performance across full temperature range and improved defeat capability against heavy explosive reactive armor.
Pz-531	Poland	WITU	2015					Tungsten alloy	6.6 kg /		8.2 kg	490 MPa	1650 m/s (L/44)		≥500 mm at 2000 m	Features a segmented penetrator made of two rods.
K279 Improved	South Korea	Poongsan Corporation	2016	998 mm	761.6 mm		27:1	Tungsten alloy	8.27 kg / 5 kg	21.3 kg	8.6 kg of 19-hole cylinder-type DNDA-57 (SCDB)	690 MPa	1800 m/s (Note: When the round reaches the end of the barrel, the muzzle velocity is 1,794.7 m/s.) (L/55)	122 m/s (at 2000 m)		Produced with a new SCDB propellant based on Solventless powder coated with polyester developed by Poongsan Corporation.
M829A4	USA	General Dynamics Ordnance & Tactical Systems and Alliant Techsystems	2016					depleted uranium alloy			SCDB granules, 19-perforated stick of DEGN		1650 m/s (L/44)			The M829A4 subprojectile has comparable characteristics to its predecessor, the M829A3, in length, weight, and center of gravity. The visible difference between the two cartridges is the Ammunition Data Link (ADL) interface rings on the base of the M829A4.
AKE-T	USA		2021			Main rod ⌀ 25 x 670 mm Tip section ⌀25 x >100 mm		Tungsten alloy Main rod with a Steel Tip Section								Consist of the in-service M829A4 and the new Advanced Kinetic Energy - Tungsten round replacing the A4's depleted uranium penetrator
KE-W A4	USA/Germany	General Dynamics Ordnance and Tactical Systems and Rheinmetall	c. 2022					Tungsten alloy			temperature insensitive propellant					Visually identical to the German DM63 120 mm APFSDS.
SHARD Mk. 1	France	Nexter Munitions	qualified in late 2023	984 mm				Plansee D10 tungsten alloy and another tungsten alloy		22 kg	EURENCO low-erosion double base propellant	520 MPa	1720 m/s (L/52); 1734 m/s (L/55)			SHARD stands for Solution for Hardenered ARmour Defeat. It is said to have 15% performance increase over current APFSDS ammunition. Barrel wear is reduced by 25%.
SHARD Mk. 2	France	Nexter Munitions						Plansee D10 tungsten alloy and another tungsten alloy				>520 MPa	>1720 m/s (L/52)			The SHARD Mk. 2 will use a more energetic propellant than the double-base propellant featured on the Mk. 1.
DM73	Germany	Rheinmetall	late 2023		745 mm	⌀ 26 × 685 mm	26:1	WSM 4-1 tungsten alloy	8.35 kg / 5 kg	21 kg	SCDB		1780 m/s (L/55)			The DM73 reuse the same penetrator of the DM63 but achieves an 8% uplift in performance regarding the combat range through the use of a more powerful propellant. The DM73 requires the high-pressure L55A1 gun and cannot be used in either L44 and L55 gun systems.
KE2020Neo	Germany	Rheinmetall	serial production foreseen for 2025					tungsten alloy								The KE2020Neo forecasted increase in performances should reach 20% compared to current APFSDS ammunition thanks to the use of a lighter sabot and a more energetic propellant, the latter is allowed by the raised chamber pressures of the improved Rh-120 L55A1 gun.

=== High Explosive Anti-Tank (HEAT) ===
Designation	Origin	Designer & producer	Year	Cartridge length (mm)	Weight, complete round (kg)	Projectile weight (kg)	Explosive filling (kg)	Fuzing	Propellant type & weight	Muzzle velocity (m/s)	Perforation at normal and oblique incidences	Notes
DM12 MZ	Germany		1979		23.2 kg	13.5 kg	1.62 kg			1140 m/s		not in production
DM12A1 MZ	Germany	Rheinmetall DeTec			23.2 kg	14.1 kg	1.627.2 kg		5.57.2 kg	1140 m/s	480 mm or 220 mm at 60° at all ranges	DM12 fitted with a fragmentation sleeve. Produced under licence by the US as M830 with exception of the fuze and the explosive. Produced under licence by Japan as JM12A1.
OCC 120 G1	France	Nexter Munitions	1981		28.5 kg	14.2 kg			5.7 kg of B19T	1050 or 1080 m/s	Defeat the Triple heavy NATO target	significant anti-personnel effects
M830 HEAT-MP-T	USA	General Dynamics	1985	981 mm	24.2 kg	13.5 kg	1.662 kg of Comp-B	M764	5.4 or 5.5 kg of DIGL-RP (Double-base)	1140 m/s		not in produce. technology transfer from the German DM12A1 except for the M764 fuze, double safety, and propellant containment bag.
M325 HEAT-MP-T	Israel	Elbit Systems	late 1980s	984 mm	25 kg	15 kg	1.8 kg of Comp-B	PIBD (electric)	5.6 kg of M26 (Double-base) or M30 (Triple-base)	1078 m/s (L/44)		1st generation Israeli HEAT-MP-T and qualified in Leopard 2, Ariete, K1A1/A2, M60A3 and other MBTs. Also known as CL-3105 on the export market.
OECC 120 F1	France	Nexter Munitions	early 1990s	983 mm	24.3 kg	14.4 kg	Comp-B		Single-base	1100 m/s	450 mm Defeat the Single heavy and Triple heavy NATO targets	improved anti-personnel effects over the OCC 120 G1
M830A1 HEAT-MP-T (a.k.a. MPAT)	USA	Alliant Techsystems (ATK)	1994	981 mm	24.68 kg	11.4 kg	Comp-A3	M774	7.1 kg of 19 Perf JA-2 (Double-base)	1410 m/s	20% performance increase against bunkers and a 30% performance increase against light armored vehicles.	80 mm sub-caliber warhead fitted with a multifunction fuzing system with airburst capability
K277 HEAT-MP-T	South Korea	Poongsan Corporation	1996	989 mm	24.5 kg	14.31 kg	Comp-B	M509A2	K682 (Triple-base)	1130 m/s (L/44)	600 mm	1st generation South Korean HEAT-MP-T developed for K1A1
K280 HEAT-MP-T	South Korea	Poongsan Corporation	2008	998 mm	23 kg	11.38 kg	2.1 kg of Comp-B	K595	K684 (Double-base)	1400 m/s (L/55)		It is a 2nd generation South Korean HEAT-MP-T developed for K2 Black Panther and has a built-in radio proximity fuze that explodes within 7 meters to counter low-flying aircraft such as helicopters.
MOD 310 HEAT-MP-T	Turkey	MKE	2018	984 mm	25 kg		1.76 kg of Comp-B		CEP-2 (Double-base)	925 m/s	400 mm at 34° at 200 m	Modified based on Israeli M325 HEAT-MP-T but fitted with a new multi-function fuze and filled with CEP-2 propellant for the low vulnerability ammunition developed by IMI Systems.

=== High Explosive (HE) ===
Designation	Origin	Designer & producer	Year	Cartridge length (mm)	Weight, complete round (kg)	Projectile weight (kg)	Propellant type & weight	Muzzle velocity	Explosive filling (kg)	Fuzing	Effects	Notes
Slsgr 95	Sweden		1995	977 mm	25 kg	17.5 kg	3.4 kg M-30	736 m/s	2.7 kg Composition B	ÖFHKSAR M/95		Rebuilt 120 mm mortar round
M908 HE-OR-T	USA	General Dynamics-OTS	2003	983 mm	22.7 kg	11.4 kg	7.1 kg 19 Perf Hex JA-2 (Double-base)	1400 m/s	3.2 kg Composition A3 Type II	Base detonating, delay fuze	did as well as, if not better than, the 15.8 kg 165 mm HEP warhead at reducing obstacles	Converted M830A1 HEAT-MP-T with a steel nosecone and a delay fuze, used to destroy concrete obstacles.
IM HE-T	Norway	Nammo			26.7 kg	15.9 kg		1030 m/s	3.2 kg IM (Insensitive Munition) explosive	Dual-mode: Superquick and delay		Produced under license by GD-OTS Canada
OE 120 F1	France	Nexter	2005		25.5 kg	15.5 kg		1050 m/s		PD fuze		
DM11 HE temp	Germany	Rheinmetall	2009		29 kg	19 kg	5.5 kg	950 m/s (L/44) or 1100 m/s (L/55)	2.17 kg HE with 600 tungsten balls	3 modes: PD, PDwD and AB	80 m cone-shaped fragmentation pattern	In service with the US Marine Corps under the Mk. 324 designation
120 EXPL F1	France	Nexter	2011		27 kg	16.8 kg		1000 m/s	3 kg HE-frag	programmable		
M339 HE-MP-T	Israel	Elbit Systems		984 mm	27 kg	17 kg	4.5 kg of NC-NG (Double-base)	900 m/s (L/44)	2.3 kg of CLX663	3 modes: PDD, PD and AB	capable of penetrating 200 mm double reinforced concrete walls	
RH31 HE SQ	Germany	Rheinmetall	2012							impact function with or without delay		low-cost variant of the DM11, the cartridge can be fired with no need for modifying existing systems.
Pz-511	Poland		2015		28.65 kg	19 kg	5.7 kg	950 m/s	2.3 kg of TNT			
120 mm HE M3M	France	Nexter	2016	945 mm	28 kg	18 kg		1050 m/s	LOVA (Double-base)	3 modes: SQ, AB and delay		
MOD 300 HE-T	Turkey	MKE	2018	984 mm	27.5 kg		CEP-2 (Double-base)	870 m/s (L/44)	4.24 kg of TNT	MOD 305		Modified based on Israeli M339 HE-MP-T
M1147 AMP	USA	Northrop Grumman	2024	919 mm	27.68 kg			1150 m/s (L/44)	approx. 2.3 kg of PAX-3 with embedded tungsten fragments	3 modes: PD, PDD, and AB		

=== High Explosive Plastic (HEP) ===
Designation	Origin	Designer & producer	Year	Cartridge length (mm)	Weight, complete round (kg)	Projectile weight (kg)	Explosive filling (kg)	Fuzing	Propellant type & weight	Muzzle velocity (m/s)	Perforation at normal and oblique incidences	Notes
M1084	Belgium	Nexter Arrowtech	2025	912 mm	24.5 kg	13.7 kg	3.6 kg insensitive explosive	base detonating (BD)	6.4 kg	1180 m/s		Fin-stabilized high-explosive squash head, under development

=== Canister (CAN) ===
Designation	Type	Origin	Designer & producer	Year	Cartridge length (mm)	Weight, complete round (kg)	Projectile weight (kg)	Propellant type & weight	Muzzle velocity	Filling	Fuzing	Effects	Notes
M1028	canister	USA	General Dynamics Ordnance and Tactical Systems			22.9 kg	15.9 kg		1410 m/s	1100 tungsten balls	no	500 m effective range	Produced under license by Nexter as OEFC 120 F1 and Nammo as 120 mm IM Canister.
M337 STUN	less-than-lethal ammunition	Israel	Elbit Systems		814 mm	13.5 kg	3.5 kg	6 kg of M30 (Triple-base)		plastic flakes	no	creates a flash, bang and blast effect and also disperses plastic flakes in the vicinity of the tank	

=== Guided munition ===
Designation	Type	Guidance	Origin	Designer & producer	Year	Weight, complete round (kg)	Weight (kg)	Warhead	Muzzle velocity	Cruise speed	Maximum range	Effects	Notes
LAHAT	GLATGM	semi-active laser-guided	Israel	IAI	1992-1999	16 kg	13 kg	tandem HEAT	300 m/s	280 m/s	6000 m (8000 m in indirect fire)		not in service
XM943 STAFF	beyond line of sight, top-attack smart munition	inertial + millimeter wave radar	USA	Alliant Techsystems	1990-1998			downward-firing EFP					program was terminated in FY 98 with final close-out in FY00
POLYNEGE	beyond line of sight, top-attack smart munition	Fire-and-forget	France	Nexter Systems	early 2000s	28 kg	20 kg	hollow charge / downward-firing EFP		600 to 700 m/s	up to 8000 m		not in service
KSTAM-I	beyond line of sight, top-attack smart munition	Terminal guidance	South Korea	Poongsan Corporation	2004			tandem HEAT	750 m/s		from 2500 m to 5000 m		not in service
KSTAM-II	beyond line of sight, top-attack smart munition	Fire-and-forget	South Korea	Poongsan Corporation	2005	21.5 kg	9.03 kg	downward-firing EFP			from 2000 m to 8000 m		Developed for the K2 Black Panther's CN08 120 mm gun
Falarick	GLATGM	semi-automatic by laser beam	Belgium and Ukraine	CMI Defence and Luch	2013	28 kg		tandem HEAT		300 m/s	beyond 5000 m	700 mm RHA behind ERA	spin-off version of the Konus GLATGM, proposed on the export market
TANOK	beyond line of sight, smart munition	semi-active laser seeker	Turkey	Roketsan	2019 (design)		11 kg	tandem HEAT			from 1000 m to 6000 m		It features two attack modes : direct and top attack. Use a "soft launch" engine.
Akeron MBT 120	BLOS missile	EO/IR	France	MDBA	2025 (design)	20-25 kg				low supersonic	up to 5000 m		top attack and fire and forget guidance

=== Target Practice Tracer (TP-T) ===
Notes on notation:

- Table includes information on ballistically-matched combat ammunition for each practice round if possible.
- TP-T stands for target practice, tracer. Some nations add a parenthetical to indicate the class of ammunition being emulated, e.g. TP-T (HEAT).
- TPCSDS-T stands for target practice, cone stabilized, discarding sabot, with tracer. It is commonly used to match the ballistics of an APFSDS round.

Designation	Type	Origin	Designer & producer	Year	Weight, complete round (kg)	Length, complete round (mm)	Propellant type & weight	Muzzle velocity	Filler type & weight	Fuzing	Notes
M831	TP-T	USA	?	early 1980s		24.2 kg	5.4 or 5.5 kg of DIGL-RP	1140 m/s			Surrogate for M830. Virtually identical to DM18, the practice round for DM12A1. Fin-stabilized.
M831A1	TP-T	USA	?	1990s	?	M14		1410 m/s			Surrogate for M830A1 HEAT-MP-T. Cheaper than M831 thanks to the removal of fins.
DM38	TPCSDS-T	Germany	Rheinmetall		before M865 (2002)			1690 m/s			not in produce
M865	TPCSDS-T	USA	General Dynamics Ordnance and Tactical Systems	2002	17.2 kg	881 mm	M14	1700 m/s	Projectiles with aluminum sabot		Surrogate for M829 APFSDS-T.
K282	TP-T (HEAT)	South Korea	Poongsan Corporation	2004	24.5 kg	989 mm	K682 (Triple-base)	1130 m/s (L/44)		K611 (Electric)	Surrogate for K277 HEAT-MP-T.
K287	ARTP-T (HEAT)	South Korea	Poongsan Corporation	2013	22.9 kg	980 mm	KM30 (Double-base)	1130 m/s (L/44)	Fe powder sintered	K604 (Electric)	Surrogate for K277 HEAT-MP-T. Anti-ricochet practice round developed to minimize accidental damage caused by the ricochet. In service in Poland.
DM48	TPCSDS-T	Germany	Rheinmetall		17.5 kg						not in produce
DM88	TPCSDS-T	Germany	Rheinmetall		21 kg			1720 m/s (L/44); 1790 m/s (L/55)			
DM98	TP-T (HE)	Germany	Rheinmetall		21 kg			1140 m/s (L/44); 1185 m/s (L/55)			
M324	TPCSDS-T	Israel	Elbit Systems		18.3 kg	925 mm	7.8 kg of NC-NG (Double-base)	1730 m/s (L/44)	Steel	M45112 (Electric)	Surrogate for "typical" APDSFS projectiles (not specifically given). Produced under licence by Turkey as MOD 291
M326	TP-T (HEAT)	Israel	Elbit Systems		25 kg	984 mm	5.6 kg of M26 (double-base) or M30 (triple-base)	1078 m/s (L/44)	Inert		Surrogate for M325 HEAT-MP-T.
M340	TP-T (HE-MP)	Israel	Elbit Systems		27 kg	984 mm	4.5 kg of NC-NG (Double-base)	900 m/s (L/44)	Inert		Surrogate for M339 HE-MP-T.
M303	TP-T "Affordable"	Israel	Elbit Systems		22 kg	984 mm	5.6 kg of NC-NG (Double-base)	1150 m/s (L/44)	Inert		Low cost round without a specified match.
120 mm IM TP-T	TP-T	Norway	Nammo		26.7 kg			1030 m/s			Surrogate for Nammo IM HE-T. Inert fuse settable in delay or superquick mode. Qualified in Leopard 2 and M1. The round is in service in several countries.
120 mm KE-TP	KE-TP	Norway	Nammo		18.3 kg			1700 m/s			Surrogate for a "typical" APFSDS. Qualified in Leopard 2 and M1. The round is in service in several countries.
PZ-521	HE-TP	Poland	Mesko		19 kg	980 mm	L-2	950 m/s	488 g of gunpowder	C-88	Qualified in Leopard 2. The round is in service in Poland. Self-detonation after 4–5 km.
PZ-541	APFSDS-T-TP	Poland	Mesko		4.8 kg	980 mm		1715 m/s			Qualified in Leopard 2. The round is in service in Poland. 1.9 kg penetrator with a diameter of ⌀68mm
MOD 292	TP-T (HEAT)	Turkey	MKE		22 kg (L/44); 22.2 kg (L/55)	933.5 mm	NC-NG (Double-base)				High pressure practice round developed based on Israeli M322 (MOD 290) APFSDS-T.
MOD 301	TP-T (HE)	Turkey	MKE		27.5 kg	984 mm	CEP-2 (Double-base)	870 m/s	4.2 kg of sorel cement	MOD 305	Practice HE round modified based on MOD 300 HE-T.

== Weapon platforms ==
- Rh-120 L44 (Germany), used on the Leopard 2 and Type 90 MBTs
  - Rh-120 L44A1 (Germany), low-recoil, proposed on the CV90120 Mk. IV.
  - Rh-120 L55 (Germany), used on later Leopard 2 variants including the Leopard 2E
  - Rh-120 L55A1 (Germany), foreseen for the Challenger 3
- M256 (United States), used on the M1 Abrams and M60-2000
  - M256E1 (United States)
- XM360 (United States)
  - XM360E1 (United States)
- CN120-25 (France), used on the AMX-32, AMX-40, and EE-T1 Osório
- CN120-26 (France), used on the Leclerc
- 120 FER (France), low-recoil, tested on the VEXTRA POLE prototype
- MG251 (Israel), used on the Merkava III
- MG251-LR (Israel) used on the Merkava IV
- MG253 (Israel) used on the M60 Sabra
- OTO Melara-Breda 120/44 (Italy), used on the C1 Ariete
- OTO Melara-Breda 120/45 (Italy), low-recoil, used on the B2 Centauro
- Leonardo 120/55 (Italy), proposed for tracked vehicles only, such as the future Italian i-MBT.
- CTG (Switzerland), low-recoil, used on the CV90120 and WPB Anders
- CN03 (South Korea), used on the K1A2
- CN08 (South Korea), used on the K2 Black Panther
- MKE 120 mm tank gun (Turkey), used on the Altay (main battle tank)
- Type 10 (Japan), used on the Type 10

== See also ==
- 105×617mm tank gun ammunition
- 125 mm smoothbore ammunition used by Russia, China and Eastern Bloc
