= NATO cartridge =

NATO cartridge may refer to:

- Small arms
  - 9×19mm NATO (STANAG 4090)
  - 4.6×30mm NATO (STANAG 4820)
  - 5.7×28mm NATO (STANAG 4509)
  - 5.56×45mm NATO (STANAG 4172)
  - 7.62×51mm NATO (STANAG 2310)
  - 12.7×99mm NATO (STANAG 4383)
  - 40 mm grenade (×46 mm LV, ×51 mm MV, ×53 mm HV)
- Autocannons
  - 20×102mm (STANAG 3585), 20 mm caliber
  - 25×137mm (STANAG 4173), 25 mm caliber
  - 27×145mmB (STANAG 3820), 27 mm caliber
  - 30×173mm (STANAG 4624), 30 mm caliber
  - 35x228mm (STANAG 4516), 35mm caliber
- Tank guns
  - 105×617mmR (STANAG 4458)
  - 120×570mmR (STANAG 4385)
- Artillery
  - 105 mm (STANAG 4425)
  - 155 mm (STANAG 4425)
9×19mm

4.6×30mm

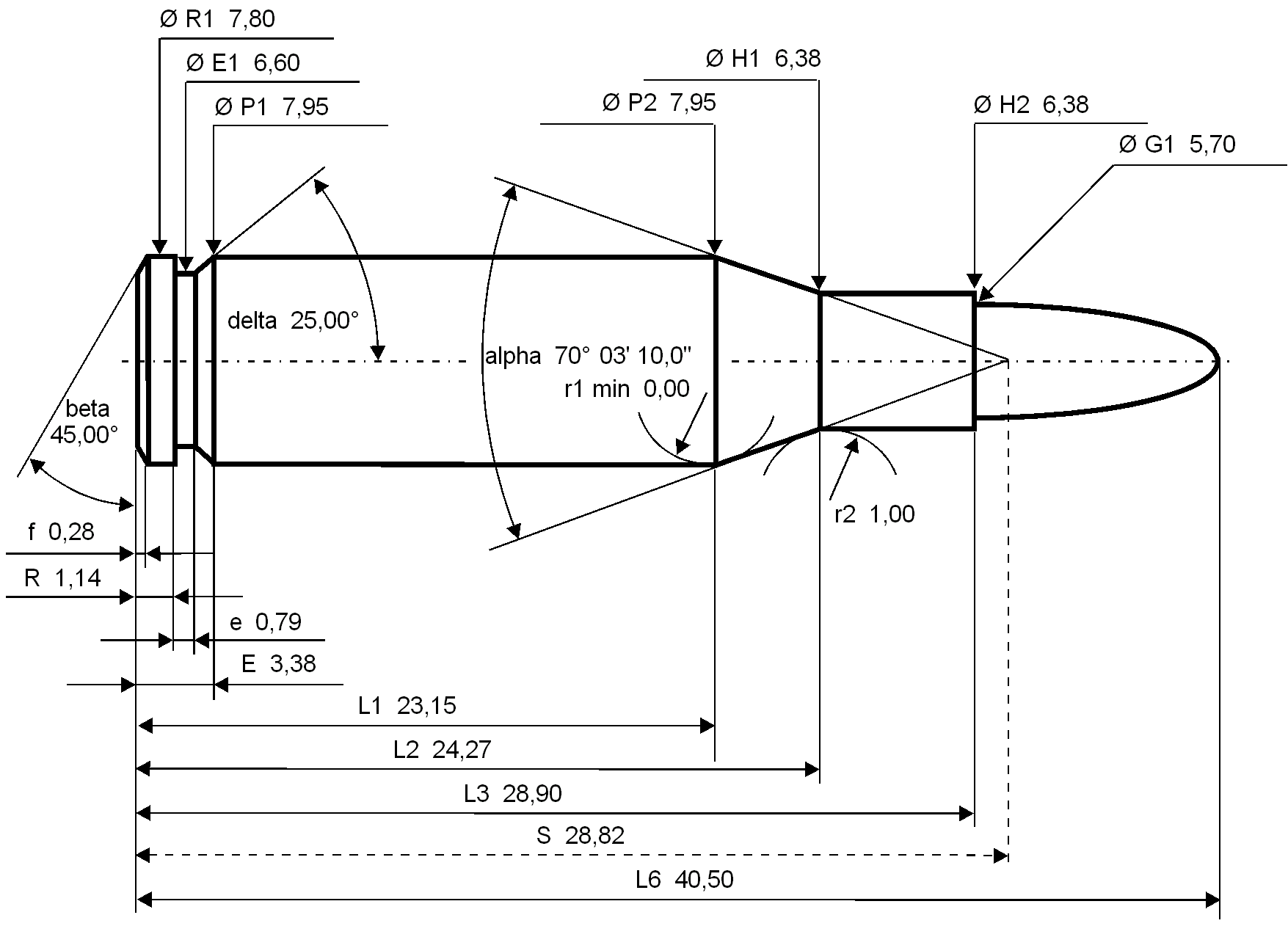
5.7×28mm

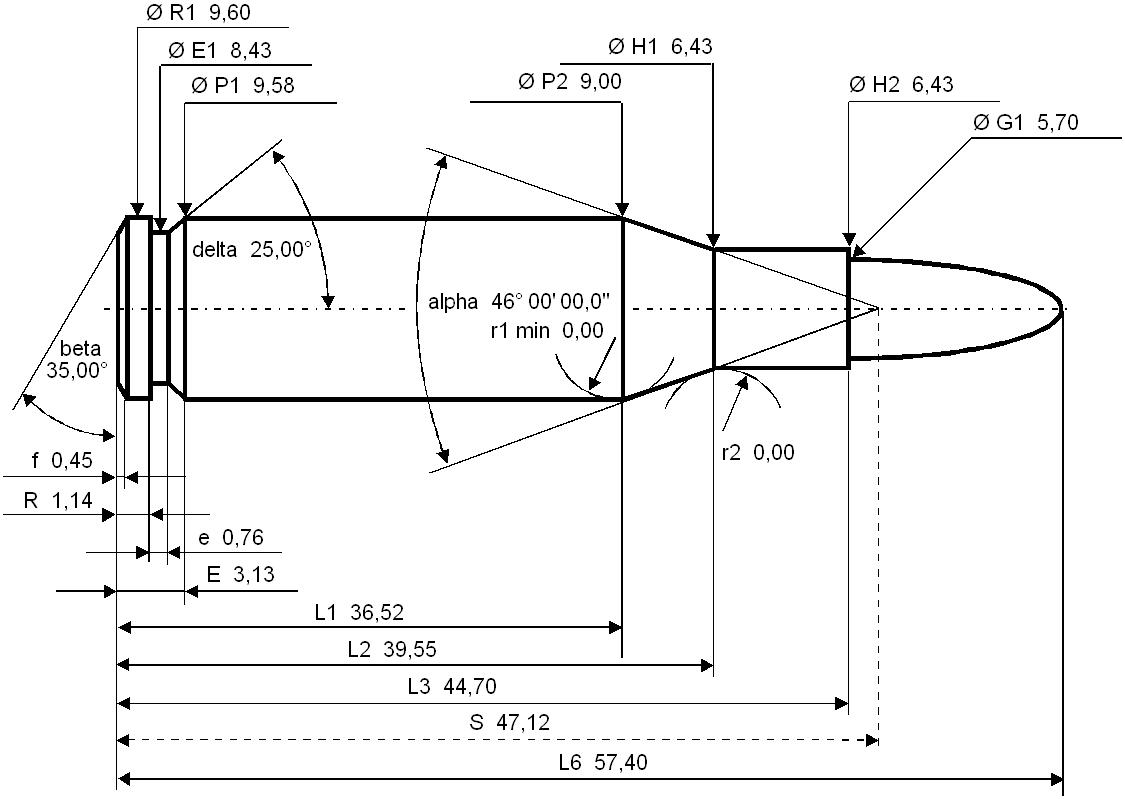
5.56×45mm

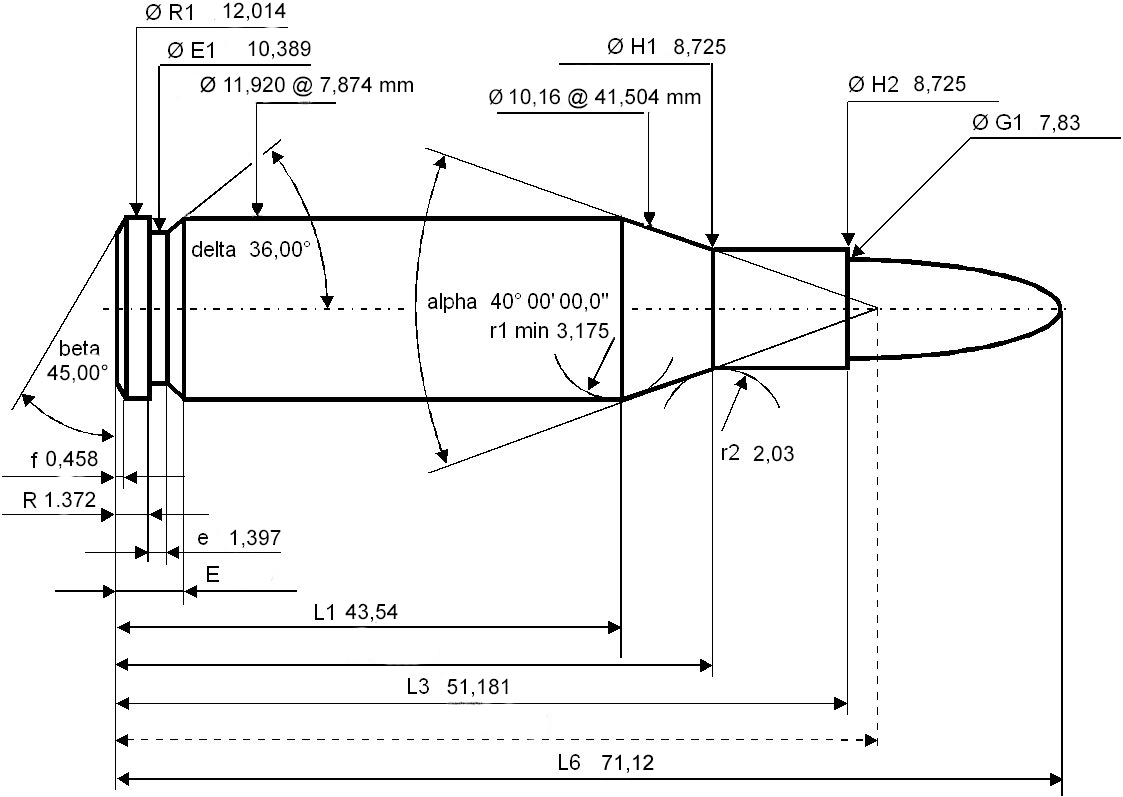
7.62×51mm

12.7×99mm
