= Non-explosive reactive armor =

Vehicle armor

Non-explosive reactive armour (NxRA), also known as non-energetic reactive armor (NERA), is a type of vehicle armor used by modern main battle tanks and heavy infantry fighting vehicles. NERA advantages over explosive reactive armor (ERA) are its inexpensiveness, multi-hit capability, and ease of integration onto armored vehicles due to its nonexplosive nature.

== Operating mechanism ==
The operating principle of NERA relies on the speed deviation of a shock wave propagating in different materials.

When a projectile such as a shaped-charge jet hits the NERA's front metal plate, a high speed shock wave is generated within. The shock wave propagates through the metal plate, until it encounters a confined non-metallic layer with elastic properties, such as rubber. Due to the lower propagation velocity of the non-metallic material, the shock wave refracts, in a manner similar to how light refracts in water. The shock wave then leaves the non-metallic layer and encounters the NERA's metallic back plate. Because of the prior refraction, the direction of propagation through the back plate is different than it was through the first plate. This causes a rapid acceleration of the metallic back plate in that new direction. This deformation, in conjunction with the first plate, is strong enough to shear the projectile or otherwise disrupt it.

== Layout ==
NERA typically consists of three-layer composite sandwich structure sloped between 50° and 60°. In order to guarantee an excellent multi-hit capability against threats, the sandwiches are overlapped in a spaced configuration forming an array.

== Materials ==
The two metallic plates in the NERA sandwich are made of steels of varying hardness and thickness. Depleted uranium plates have also been tested. Rubber and plastic were initially used as the inner non-metallic material, but modern materials now include foam, nylon, polycarbonate, glass, elastomer and more energetic materials such as glycidyl azide polymer (GAP).

== History ==
=== British developments ===
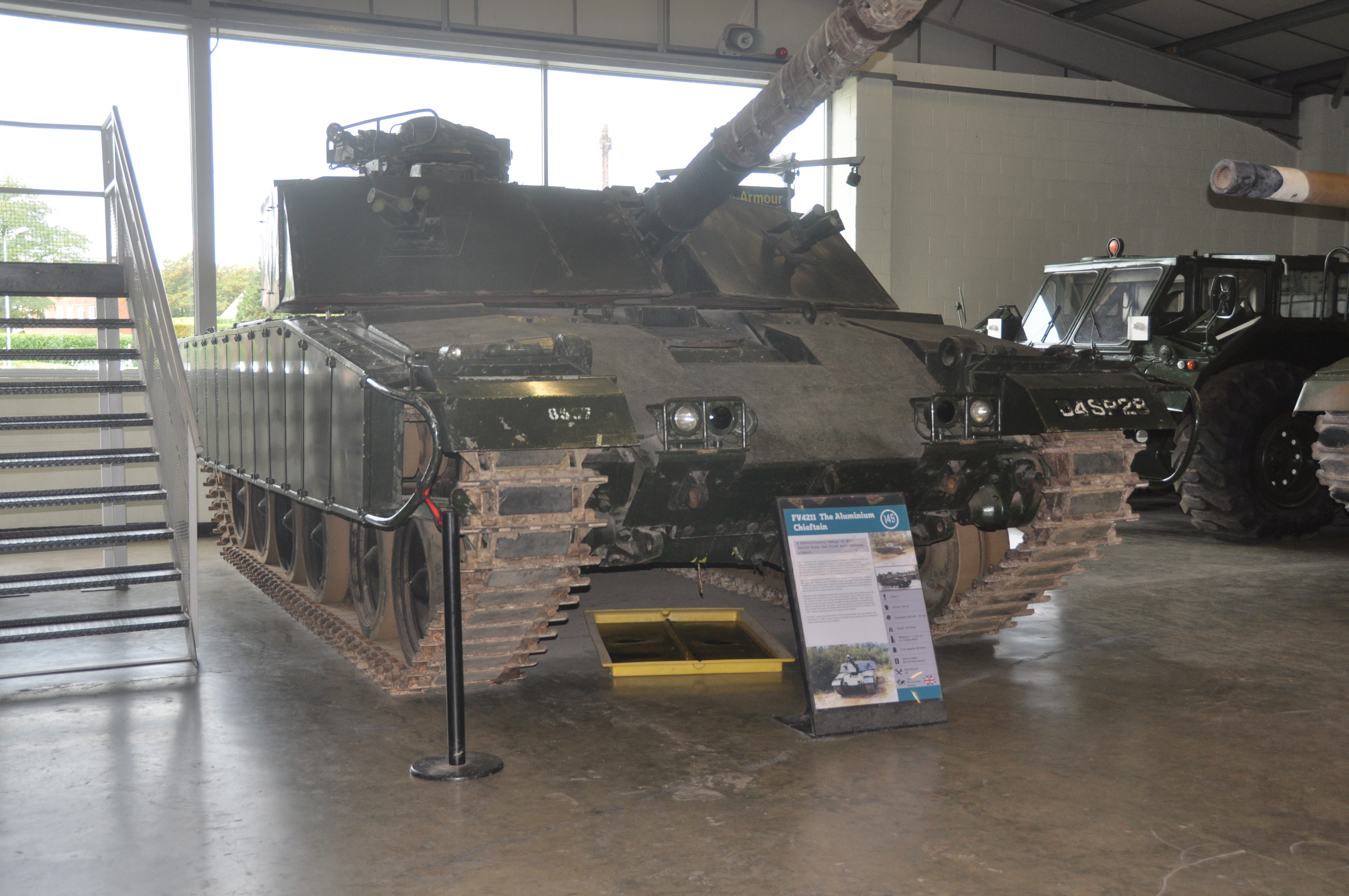
The aluminium-hulled FV4211 demonstrated for the first time that the use of Chobham armor on a tank was practical.

The threat posed by anti-tank guided missiles was clearly recognized by the FVRDE and as a result, a research program was initiated in 1963. The program was largely of an empirical nature and was directed by Dr G.N Harvey, then assistant director of Research at FVRDE (who has been generally credited with the invention of Chobham armor) in collaboration with J.P Downey, who was responsible for its extensive series of firing trials. The research program began to bear fruit in 1964, and by the following year had resulted in the creation of a new form of armor which was more than twice as effective against shaped charges as rolled homogeneous armor of the same weight, and at least as effective as the latter against kinetic energy armor-piercing projectiles. The new armor was then called Chobham armour, after the location of FVRDE.
In 1968 work began on applying it to tanks and a feasibility study (codenamed Almagest) on fitting Chobham armour (also called Burlington) to the Chieftain main battle tank was undertaken. Two different Chobham armour kits were used, the skirt armor consisted basically of steel boxes containing plastic/steel sandwiches arranged in the manner of venetian blinds assembly while the front hull armor consisted of a bar armor mounted over a steel burster plate with three sandwiches consisting each of three to five plastic and steel layers underneath.
By February 1970 a decision was taken to build an experimental tank based on the Chieftain Mk. 3 components, which would incorporate Chobham armour. The test vehicle was built at FVRDE in 13 months and was designated as FV4211. In addition to having Chobham armour, the FV4211 was also the first main battle tank to have a hull made of welded aluminium plates to keep down its weight.

=== Russian developments ===
During the 1977 summer, samples of Chobham armour were smuggled from West Germany into East Germany by Soviet agents. (Note: According to Douglas Devin, a subscriber of the US Army's ARMOR magazine in which he refers to a 1977 article from The Daily Express of London, a British newspaper.)
In the early 1980s, NII Stali developed in conjunction with Uralvagonzavod a new turret for the late production T-72A with “отражающие листы” (Russian for "reflecting plates") armor inserts. By September 1982, the cast turret codenamed 172.10.077SB entered low rate production (Note: According to the article "T-72: Part 2" published on Tankograd, a blog specialized on Soviet armor.) and was then dubbed "Super Dolly Parton" by Western observers due to its prominent shape. Each reflecting plate array consisted of an assembly of three layers; a heavy armor plate, a rubber interlayer and a thin metal plate, all glued together.

=== French developments ===
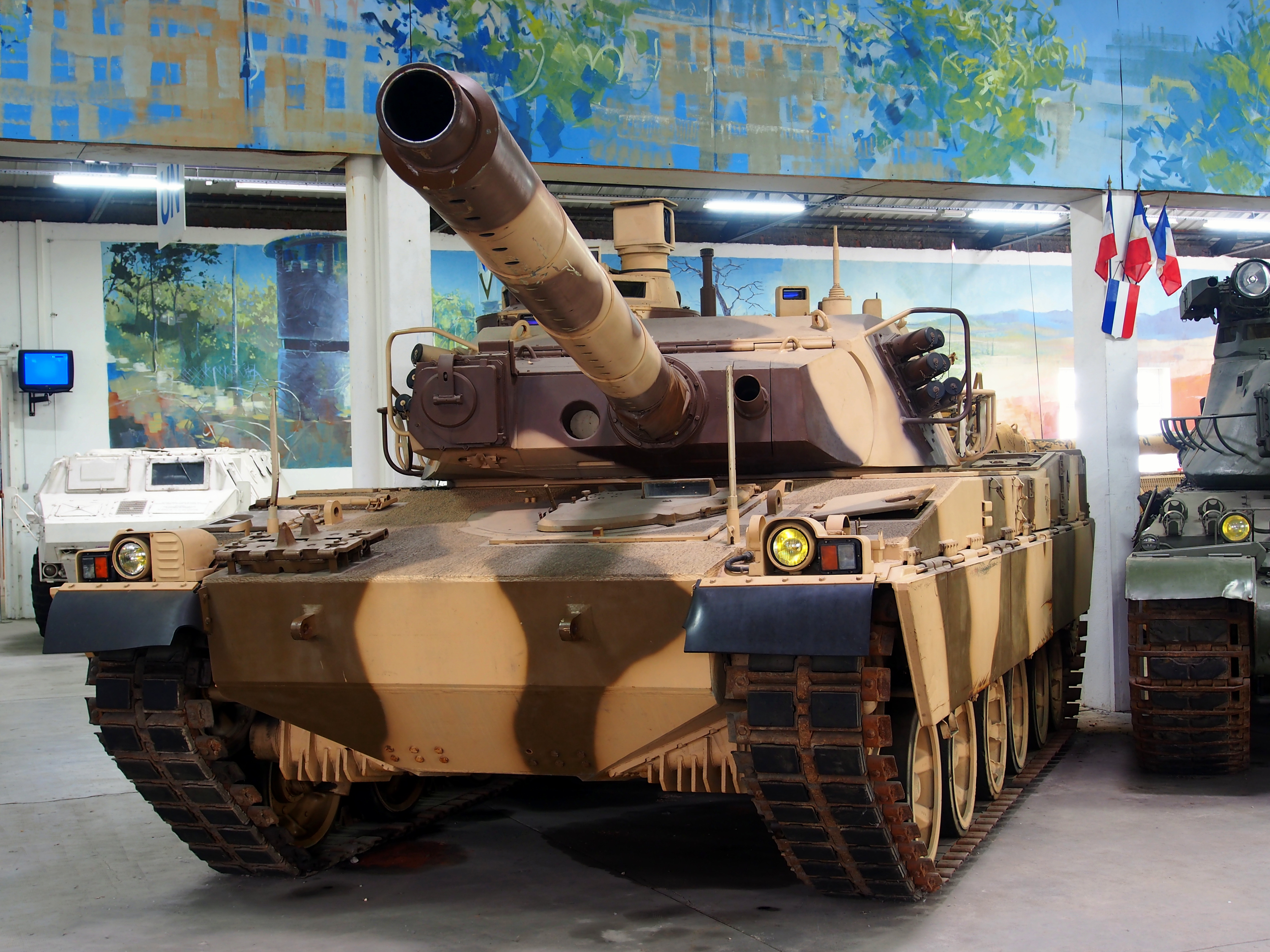
The AMX-40 was fitted with NERA elements inside its gun mantlet and hull front.

By the end of 1979, the AMX-APX began to investigate further its research on composite armor for the upcoming AMX-40 main battle tank. In order to remain competitive on the foreign market, the new armor was to represent a technological breakthrough compared to spaced armor previously developed for the AMX-32.
Furthermore, the Staff of the French Army (EMAT) had high hopes in the EPC program which was to lead to the creation of the Leclerc main battle tank. Protection against modern threats being a keystone of the program. The armor research department of the AMX-APX was managed at the time by Maurice Bourgeat and his assistant Daniel Vallée, both were weapons scientists and worked closely with the French-German Research Institute of Saint -Louis (ISL) and the Central Technical Establishment of Weapons at Arcueil (ETCA). Under contract to the Technical Center of Land Weapons (CETAM) of Bourges, they developed the first configuration of what would later be named the PAC or Plaques Accélérées par Chocs (French for "Shock-Accelerated Plates") whose working principle and layout can be compared to Non-Explosive Reactive Armor (NERA).
Bourgeat and Vallée later worked on its integration on the Leclerc tank in the form of removable composite modules. They were awarded the 1987 Engineer Chanson Prize for their work.

=== Iraqi developments ===
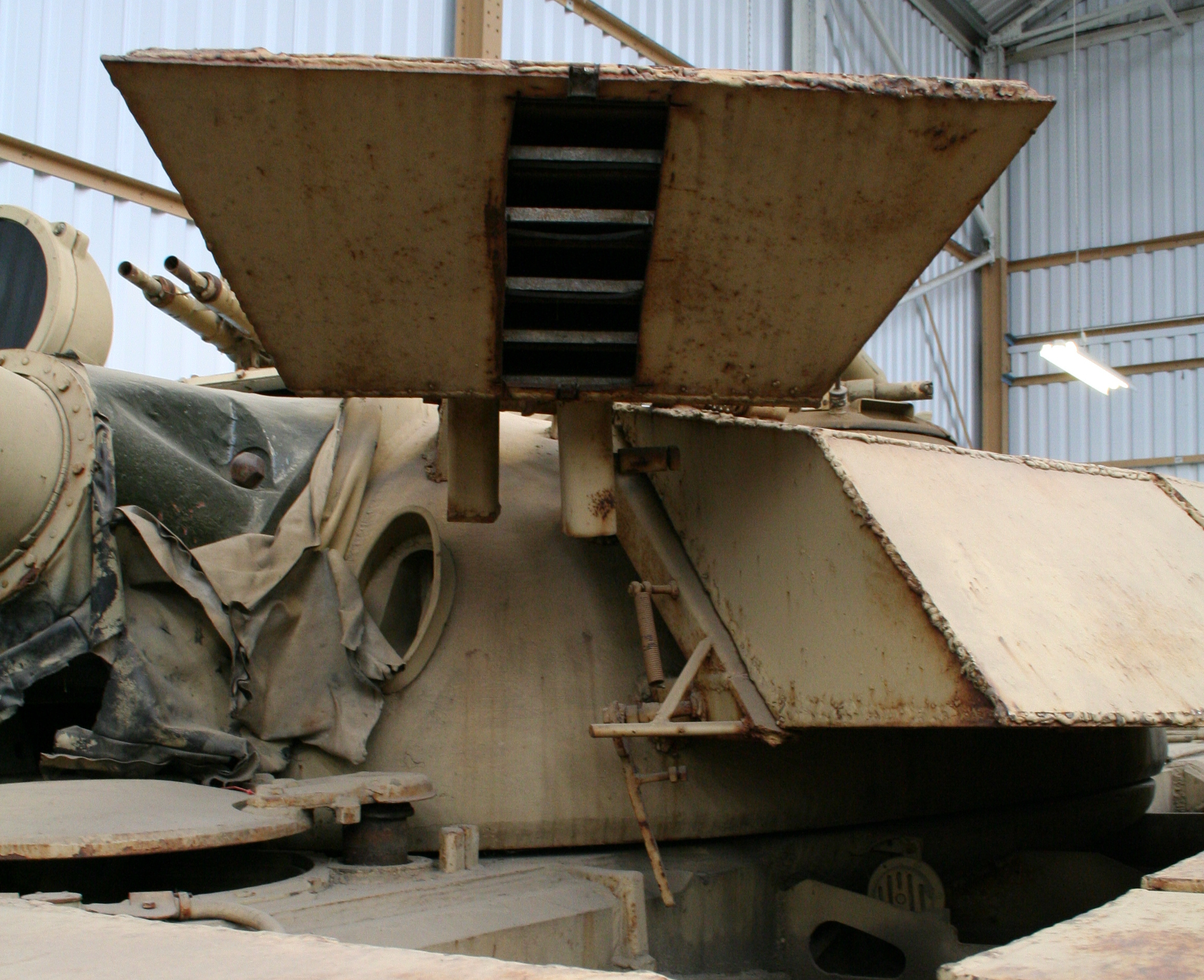
The add-on armour box of this Iraqi T-55 Enigma contains six NERA sandwiches.

In 1989, the Iraqi Military Production Authority (MPA) unveiled a composite appliqué armor kit for the T-55 at the Baghdad International Exhibition of Military Technology, also known as the Baghdad Arms Fair. This appliqué armour was fitted to a small number of tanks prior to the Gulf War. Those tanks were known by the Iraqi Army as Al Faw and Enigma by NATO intelligence services because of its unknown nature at that time. During combat use in the battle of Khafji, the armour proved to be effective against MILAN anti-tank guided missiles. Post-war assessment of the appliqué armour of the captured Al Faw showed that the each armour block contained a spaced array of several sandwiches made of aluminium and steel sheets with a rubber interlayer. Despite the crude appearance, tests showed that the Enigma appliqué armor could defeat all Western ATGMs and anti-tank handheld weapons at the time, with the exception of the AGM-114 Hellfire missile.
