= AMX-40 =

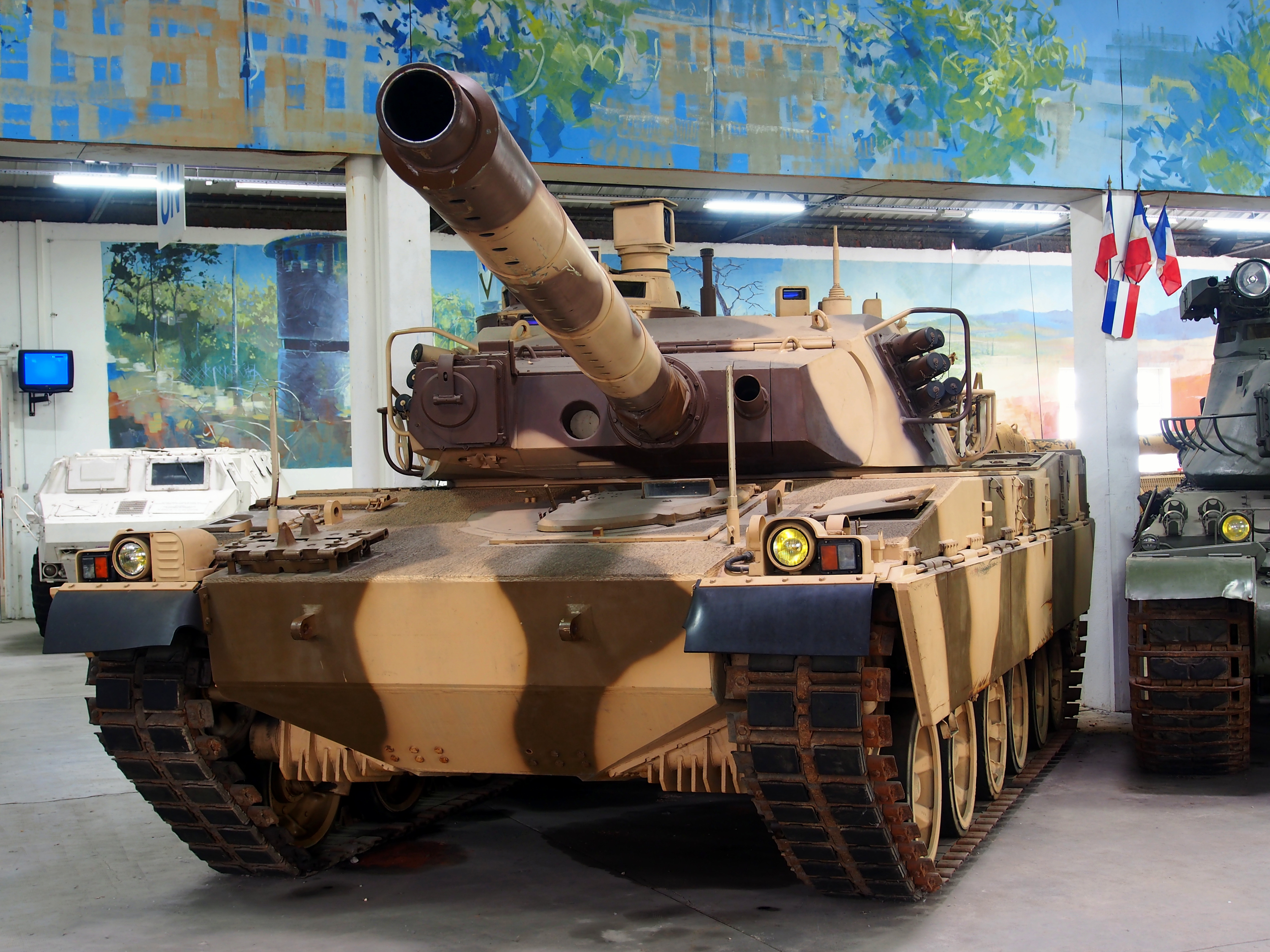
- One of the AMX-40 prototypes at the Musée des Blindés at Saumur
- Type: Main battle tank
- Place of origin: France

Production history
- Designed: 1983
- Manufacturer: AMX-APX and GIAT

Specifications
- Mass: 43.7 t (43.0 long tons; 48.2 short tons)
- Length: 10.04 m (32 ft 11 in) (with gun barrel), 6.8 m (22 ft 4 in) hull
- Width: 3.18 m (10 ft 5 in) 3.36 m (11 ft 0 in) (with side skirts)
- Height: 2.38 m (7 ft 10 in)
- Crew: 4
- Armour: composite armor
- Main armament: 120 mm GIAT model G1 smoothbore gun (L/52) (40 rounds)
- Secondary armament: 1 x 20 mm M693 autocannon with 578 rounds 2 x 7.62 mm ANF1 machine guns (2170 rounds)
- Engine: Poyaud V12XS25 diesel engine 1,100 horsepower (820 kW)
- Power/weight: 25.6 hp (19.1 kW)/ton
- Transmission: ZF LSG 3000 (4 fwd/2 rev)
- Suspension: torsion bar with rotary shock absorbers
- Ground clearance: 450 mm (18 in)
- Fuel capacity: 1,300 L (290 imp gal; 340 US gal)
- Operational range: 550 km (340 mi) to 600 km (370 mi)
- Maximum speed: 70 km/h (43 mph)

The AMX-40 was a French main battle tank developed by GIAT during the latter stages of the Cold War as an export tank to replace the earlier AMX-32. Designed to be an inexpensive tank oriented towards militaries with smaller defence budgets, the AMX-40 featured a lightly armoured hull and good mobility reminiscent of previous French MBTs with a powerful 120 mm cannon. It however failed to attract interest and sales, rendering the project a failure, being discontinued in 1990.

== History ==
As the AMX-32 had failed to attract any potential sales, GIAT decided to produce yet another upgrade, the AMX-40 Main Battle Tank. The development of the AMX-40 began in 1980 as a clean sheet design. In 1983, the first prototype was finished and presented at the Satory Exhibition that year. Two further prototypes were produced in 1984; the fourth and last one was fabricated in 1985. The design was not intended for service in France, but as a successor to the AMX-32, the improved export version of the AMX-30. However, the efforts to obtain foreign orders failed, the most serious potential customer to have considered the design being Spain and India. It ceased being offered for export in 1990, when the end of the Cold War brought lots of surplus MBTs on the market.

== Design ==
=== Armament ===
The main armament consisted of a GIAT 120 mm CN120-25 model G1 smoothbore gun. The main gun ammunition load was 37 to 40 rounds depending on the prototype. Up to 17 rounds can be stored in the turret, 14 of those are stored in a sealed compartment inside the turret bustle fitted with blowout panels. Ten of them are loaded in two electrically operated drums. The rest of the rounds were stored in a large rack to the right of the driver. The tank could fire a variety of NATO 120 mm ammunition, including the French OCC 120 G1 HEAT round and the OFL 120 G1 APFSDS round which are suitable for all NATO 120mm smooth bore gun. The OFL 120 G1 was capable of penetrating 420 mm of RHA steel armor at 1,000 m range.

The auxiliary armament included a 20 mm M693 autocannon, a derivative of the GIAT designed F2 autocannon. Since the elevation (up to +40°) system can be operated independently of that of the 120 mm gun, this armament provides a not inconsiderable capability for defense against ground and air targets. In addition, a 7.62 mm AAN-F1 light machine gun for short-range anti-aircraft or ground defense is linked to the hatch of the TOP 7 commander cupola. It can be fired from inside the cupola.

Twelve Lacroix Galix 80 mm launchers are grouped in two packs of six and are located on either side of the turret, these launchers can throw aerosol smoke grenades, flares and anti-personnel fragmentation grenades.

=== Optics and fire control system ===
The gunner has a M581 monocular telescopic sight with a magnification of x10, it is fitted with a CILAS laser rangefinder and linked to the COSTAC integrated automatic fire control system.

The commander has the latest iteration of the TOP 7 cupola with eight non-reflecting periscopes. A SFIM M527 gyrostabilized panoramic sight with three channels; two daylight (x2 and x8) and one with light intensification. The M527 sight makes it possible to observe and open fire almost instantly whilst on the move because the gun is slaved to the sight.

An auxiliary daylight sight is available in option. A DIVT-13 low light television camera (LLLTV) with a x1 magnification allows night observation up to 1200 m. It can be replaced by a DIVT 16 CASTOR thermal camera. The image obtained is displayed on two TV monitors (gunner and commander).

=== Mobility ===
The tank was powered by a 24,690 cc (1,507 cu in) 1,100 horsepower (820 kW) Poyaud V12XS25 diesel engine coupled to an automatic ZF LSG 3000 transmission. The number of road wheels per side was increased from the five used on the AMX-32 to six. Like the AMX-32, the AMX-40 used the same 570 mm-wide dry pin tracks of the AMX-30.

The combat weight was limited to 43.7 metric tonnes. The low weight, in combination with the powerful engine, ensured an excellent mobility (with 70 kilometres per hour (43 mph) maximum road speed and 50 km/h (31 mph) cross country speed). The AMX-40 accelerates from 0 to 32 km/h (0–20 mph) in 6 seconds.

=== Armor ===
The front turret and hull armour incorporated spaced armor bulkheads with high-hardness outer steel plates. The bulkheads include NERA arrays and are designed to withstand 76 mm and 100 mm armor-piercing rounds and RPG-7 warheads. The sides of the turret were made of spaced armor designed to withstand impacts from 23 mm armor-piercing rounds. Possibly, the AMX-40 could be equipped with a composite dozer blade and add-on armor on the bustle roof.

Despite the armour afforded to the AMX-40, it was still considered light by late Cold War standards, especially when compared to NATO contemporaries such as the heavier M1 Abrams, Leopard 2 and Challenger 1. The armour could not effectively stop Soviet munitions fired by tanks such as the T-72 and T-80.

== Trials ==
In January 1985 the first AMX-40 prototype, the P1 was tested in Valdahon. The goal was to familiarize the crews with the new tank and evaluate its mobility on soft ground. It was found that power of the engine (800 horsepower (600 kW)) was deemed a bit inadequate and the viewing arc of the commander's cupola should be reviewed.

During the summer of 1985, the P3 prototype was sent to Djibouti for hot zone testing by the manufacturer. The results were satisfactory overall but the AMX-30 tracks were judged to be too narrow to handle the power and the weight of the AMX-40.

The next summer, in 1986, at least one AMX-40 prototype participated in desert trials in Abu Dhabi.

In July 1987, an AMX-40 prototype was sent to Saudi Arabia, where it underwent a series of tests (the Saudi Arabian Army wanted at the time to replace its M60 and AMX-30S). Therefore, the AMX-40 had undergone a series of modifications. The power of V12X was increased to 1,325 horsepower (988 kW) by fitting a second turbocharger. The 12 ready rounds in the turret bustle are now stowed pointing forwards, which simplifies handling within the turret and speeds up gun loading operations. Finally, an inertial reference unit was fitted to the turret mantlet allows firing on the move using gunner's day and night sights.
Two AMX-40 prototypes (CH4 hull + T2 turret and CH3 + T3 turret) competed alongside the M1A1, the Challenger 1 and the P2 prototype of the EE-T2 Osório in Khamis Mushait and in Sharurah, near the Saudi Arabia–Yemen border. They covered 1200 km on various terrains such as roads, sand dunes and rockery and 200 120 mm rounds (mostly APFSDS) were fired. In general, instant performances met the expectations but the tour made clear that the narrow AMX-30's 570 mm-wide tracks exceeded their mechanical limits, heavily penalizing the AMX-40's general image.

== Prototypes ==
- P1 : rolled out of the Satory workshop in 1983, directly issued from the work of its predecessor, the AMX-32.
- P2 : used the CH2 hull and the T2 turret. The CH2 hull was modified in order to be fitted with the powerpack of the future Leclerc (V8X1500). In the end, it was fitted with the 1,100 horsepower (820 kW) V12XS25 engine coupled to the LSG 3000 transmission. The P2 prototype had been handed over to the technical section of the French Army on several occasions.
- P3 : used the CH3 hull and the T3 turret. It was powered by a German MTU diesel engine coupled to a ZF transmission.
- P4 : consisted only of a CH4 hull using a 1,300 horsepower (970 kW) version of the V12X engine coupled to the SESM ESM 500 transmission.
- P01 : first pre-production model
- P02 : second pre-production model using the C02 hull. Preserved at the Musée des Blindés at Saumur.
- E4 : also known as E50, it was intended for the Egyptian Army and featured an improved frontal protection against 115 mm steel APFSDS and 3M11 Fleyta ATGM. Its effectiveness has been proven by firing at it with French 105 mm tungsten APFSDS and shaped-charge rounds. In order to eliminate any remaining weakspot in the frontal arc, the 20 mm autocannon was replaced by a fixed 7.62 mm coaxial machine gun and the gunner sight was relocated on the turret roof. As the hull was lengthened and widen, the projected combat weight was 50 t (49 long tons; 55 short tons), thus a 1200-1300 hp engine and wider NATO standard 635 mm tracks were foreseen. The E4 project remained on the drawing board.

== See also ==
- AMX-32
- Vickers Mk. 4 Valiant
