= CN120-25 =

French tank gun

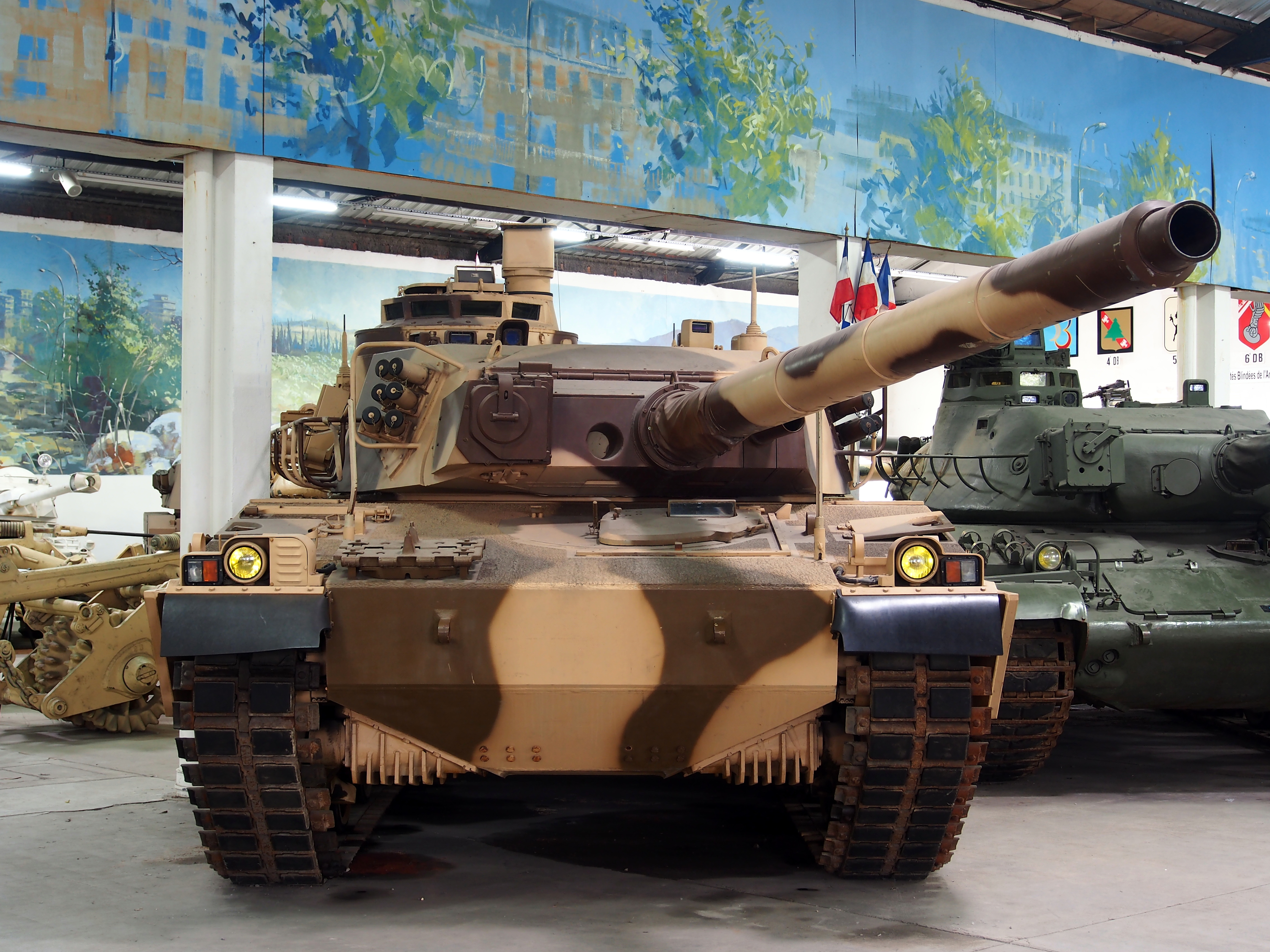
- Type: smoothbore tank gun
- Place of origin: France

Production history
- Designer: EFAB of Bourges
- Designed: 1979
- Manufacturer: Giat Industries

Specifications
- Mass: 2450 kg
- Length: 7,154 m (23,471 ft 2 in)
- Barrel length: 6.2 m (20 ft 4 in) or 52 calibers
- Shell: 120×570mm NATO
- Calibre: 120 mm (2.95 in)
- Action: semi-automatic vertical sliding-wedge breech
- Recoil: 485 mm
- Elevation: -8° to +20°
- Traverse: 360°
- Muzzle velocity: 1650 m/s (APFSDS)
- Sights: M581 (AMX-40) or VS 580-19 (EE-T2 Osório)

The CN120-25, also simply referred to as Modèle G1 (G1 model) is a French smoothbore 120mm tank gun of 52 calibers designed by the EFAB of Bourges for the export market.

== Description ==
Designed by the Établissement d'Études et de Fabrication d'Armements de Bourges (EFAB), the G1 120 mm smoothbore gun has been designed to be interchangeable with the rifled 105 mm CN 105 F1 tank gun. The G1 uses semi-combustible propellant cases and has been designed to fire both French-produced ammunition and German Rheinmetall-produced ammunition. A vertical sliding breech-block is used, the barrel is chrome-plated and autofrettaged.

The 120 mm smooth-bore gun G1 has been fitted to the private venture Giat Industries AMX-32, AMX-40 and the Brazilian ENGESA EE-T2 Osório main battle tanks, neither of which entered production. This weapon was previously referred to as the CN120-24 gun.

== Additional specifications ==
- Maximum service chamber pressure: 630 MPa (91,000 psi)
- Recoil effort at trunnions: 365 kN (APFSDS fired at +51 °C)
- Overall weight: 2450 kg
- Recoiling gun mass: 1830 kg

== See also ==
- CN120-26 120 mm gun: French equivalent, developed by EFAB in 1980s.

=== Weapons of comparable role, performance and era ===
- L11A5 120 mm rifled gun: British rifled equivalent, developed by Royal Armament Research and Development Establishment (RARDE) in 1957.
- 2A46 125 mm gun: Russian 125-mm equivalent, developed by Spetstekhnika Design Bureau in 1960s.
- Rheinmetall 120 mm gun: German equivalent, developed by Rheinmetall in 1974.
- EXP-28M1 120 mm rifled tank gun: Experimental British weapon of the late 1970s/early 1980s. Was to have equipped the MBT-80.
- IMI 120 mm gun: Israeli equivalent, developed by Israeli Military Industries in 1988.
- OTO Breda 120 mm gun: Italian equivalent, developed by OTO Melara in 1988.
- L30A1 120 mm rifled gun: British rifled equivalent, developed by ROF Nottingham in 1989.
- JSW 120 mm gun: Japanese equivalent, developed by Japan Steel Works in 2008.
- CN08 120 mm gun: South Korean equivalent, developed by Agency for Defense Development (ADD) and WIA in 2008.
- 2A82-1M 125 mm gun: New Russian 125-mm equivalent, developed by Uralvagonzavod in 2014.
- MKE 120 mm tank gun: Turkish equivalent, developed by Otokar and Hyundai WIA in 2016.
