= EE-T1 Osório =

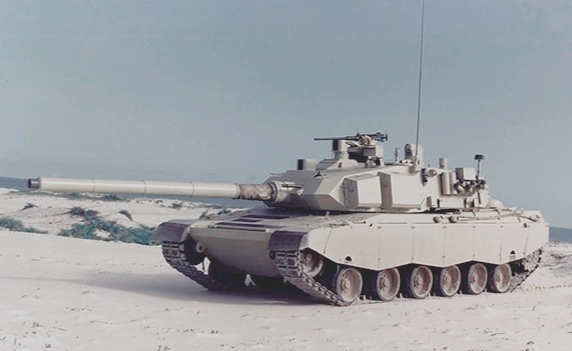
- Engesa EE-T1 Osório prototype
- Type: Main battle tank
- Place of origin: Brazil

Service history
- Used by: Brazil

Production history
- Designer: Engesa
- Designed: 1982–86
- Manufacturer: Engesa
- Unit cost: $ 6,855,859.20 BRL, (1,308,494.89 USD)
- Produced: 1986
- No. built: 2 prototypes

Specifications
- Mass: 40.9 t (45.1 short tons; 40.3 long tons) (P1); 43.7 t (48.2 short tons; 43.0 long tons) (P2)
- Length: 7.13 m (23 ft 5 in) (Without the tower); 9.36 m (30 ft 9 in) (P1); 10.1 m (33 ft 2 in) (P2)
- Width: 3.26 m (10 ft 8 in)
- Height: 2.37 m (7 ft 9 in); 2.68 m (8 ft 10 in) (P1); 2.89 m (9 ft 6 in) (P2)
- Crew: 4 (commander, gunner, loader, driver)
- Armor: composite, including aluminum/steel, carbon fibers, and ceramics.
- Main armament: 105 mm L7 rifled gun (P1), 120 mm Giat Industries G1 smoothbore gun (P2)
- Secondary armament: M2HB 12.7 mm machine gun x2 (coaxial and roof mounted)
- Engine: 12-cylinder MWM TBD 234 Diesel engine 1,100 horsepower (820 kW)
- Power/weight: 26 hp/tonne
- Transmission: ZF Friedrichshafen LSG 3000
- Suspension: hydropneumatic
- Operational range: 550 km (340 mi)
- Maximum speed: 70 km/h (43 mph)

The Engesa EE-T1 Osório was a Brazilian main battle tank prototype developed by Engesa. The tank was intended to be sold first to Arab and other Third World countries, jump-starting production — and enabling the Brazilian Army to later place its own orders without having to fund development costs. Development of the tank was initially privately funded by Engesa, but cashflow issues eventually led to the Brazilian government extending a loan to assist the program. Two prototypes of the tank were built, but the EE-T1 was never adopted for service.

== Development ==
The EE-T1 was envisioned by Engesa as a cost-effective tank made using domestically produced components. The tank was intended for the foreign market. Development started in 1982 and the first prototype was completed in 1985. The initial development of the tank was expensive and caused a cashflow crisis at Engesa, prompting the Brazilian National Development Bank to extend a $65 million loan to finance the program in 1987.

The tank was seen by some sources as an example of Brazil's modernizing defense industry, while others noted that the tank continued to use imported parts; according to an anonymous Engesa official cited in the Latin American Research Review, the EE-T1 would make heavier use of imported parts (including the tank's turret) when compared to the company's armored cars. The production model of the EE-T1 was less expensive than other western main battle tanks (MBTs), with one source calculating the cost per unit at $1.5-2 million. However, a perception persisted that supply chains for the EE-T1, spare parts and accessories might be unreliable. In 1990, political scientist Ethan B. Kapstein noted that while its technical performance was reportedly comparable to contemporary MBTs, there were doubts that the EE-T1 project as a whole was commercially viable.

The tank was reportedly considered by Algeria, Iraq, Libya, and Saudi Arabia, but orders never materialized. The loss of the Saudi Arabian deal was particularly devastating and led to the EE-T1 not proceeding beyond the prototype stage.

Soon the end of the Cold War brought lots of surplus MBTs on the market and left the program with no prospects. After being stalled by Engesa's bankruptcy filing in 1993, the project was finally scrapped following the collapse of Brazilian armored vehicle industry in the late 1990s.

Whilst pre-series tanks were scrapped, with many of the key components being returned to manufacturers to recoup a portion of financial losses, the two EE-T1 prototypes sat in storage at the São Paulo War Arsenal in Barueri until they were officially added to the 13th Mechanized Cavalry Regiment, based in Pirassununga, São Paulo in March 2003. They remained in limited service with the regiment until 2013 when they were removed from service and placed on display. The 105mm prototype now lives in the Military Museum Conde de Linhares, whilst the 120 mm prototype resides in the Armored Instruction Center, both in Rio de Janeiro.

== Users ==
- Brazil
