= 105×617mmR =

Widely used calibre of tank gun ammunition

105×617R
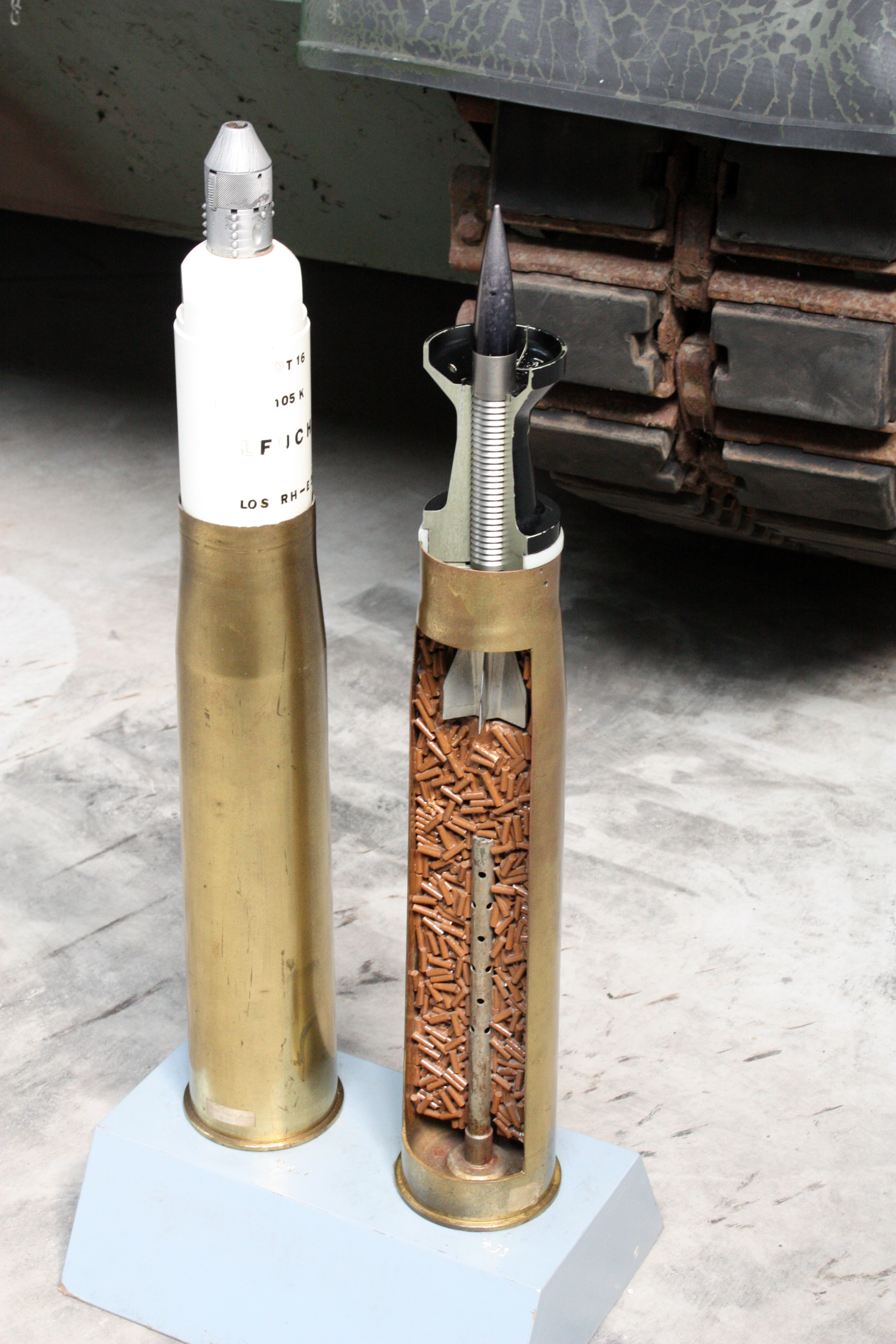
- A 105 mm DM16 illuminating round alongside a 105 mm DM23 APFSDS round (cross-sectioned).
- Type: Tank gun
- Place of origin: United Kingdom

Service history
- In service: 1959–present
- Used by: Western Bloc and others

Production history
- Designer: RARDE Fort Halstead
- Designed: 1950s

Specifications
- Case type: Rimmed, bottleneck
- Bullet diameter: 105 mm (4.1 in)
- Shoulder diameter: 129 mm (5.1 in)
- Base diameter: 137 mm (5.4 in)
- Rim diameter: 147 mm (5.8 in)
- Case length: 607–617 mm (23.9–24.3 in)

The 105×617mm (4.1 inch), also known as 105×617mmR, is a common, NATO-standard, tank gun cartridge used in 105 mm guns such as those derived from the Royal Ordnance L7.

The 105×617mmR cartridge was originally developed from the 84 mm (3.3 in) calibre Ordnance QF 20-pounder 84 × 618R cartridge as part of the development of the L7 105 mm rifled gun.

== Ammunition ==
=== Armour-piercing discarding sabot (APDS) ===
Designation	Origin	Year	Penetrator material	Propellant type & weight	Chamber pressure	Muzzle velocity	Velocity drop	Sub-projectile weight without sabot / with sabot	Perforation at normal and oblique incidences	Notes
L22	United Kingdom	1950s	Tungsten carbide							
L28A1	United Kingdom	1959	Tungsten carbide (core) and Tungsten alloy cap	5.598 kg of NQ/M 044	310 MPa	1478 m/s	93 m/s (at 1000 m) 185 m/s (at 2000 m)	4.1 kg / 5.84 kg	120 mm at 60° at 914 m	Produced under licence by Germany as DM13, used in the Swedish Army as 60 mm Slpprj m/61 and in the Swiss Army as 10,5 Pz Kan 60/61 Pz Ke G Lsp.
L36A1 / M392	United Kingdom	1959	Tungsten carbide (core) and tungsten alloy cap	5.598 kg of NQ/M 044	310 MPa	1478 m/s	93 m/s (at 1000 m) 185 m/s (at 2000 m)	4.1 kg / 5.84 kg	120 mm at 60° at 914 m	British designation of the M392 APDS manufactured in the UK for the US Army, it features a safer primer. Quickly replaced in US service by M392A1
M392A1	United States	1960	Tungsten carbide (core) and tungsten alloy cap	5.598 kg of NQ/M 044		1478 m/s	91 m/s (at 1000 m) 181 m/s (at 2000 m)	4.04 kg / NA	127 mm at 60° at 4609 ft/s or ~820 m	US manufactured version of L36A1/M392. Manufactured to tighter tolerances for improved accuracy, and to correct an issue of in barrel breakup.
M392A2	United States	1964	Tungsten carbide (core) and tungsten alloy cap	5.598 kg of NQ/M 044		1478 m/s	91 m/s (at 1000 m) 181 m/s (at 2000 m)	4.04 kg / NA	127 mm at 60° at 4609 ft/s or ~820 m	Incorporates the anti-friction ring from L28A1B1.
Slpprj m/62	Sweden	1962	Tungsten carbide (core)	6.0 kg NK1096	310 MPa	1450 m/s		4.5 kg / 6.32 kg	200 mm at 30° obliquity at 1500 m, 140 mm at 55° at 700 m	Swedish-developed APDS round with a 57 mm sub-caliber projectile
L52	United Kingdom	1965 or 1966; 1968 (L52A2)	Tungsten alloy (core) and Tungsten alloy (tilt cap)	5.598 kg of NQ/M 047; 5.6 kg of NQ/M12 (L52A3)	310 MPa	1427 m/s	80 m/s (at 1000 m) 158 m/s (at 2000 m)	4.65 kg / 6.48 kg	120 mm at 60° obliquity at 1830 m 280 mm and 254 mm at 0° obliquity at 1000 m and 1500 m respectively	The L52 introduced an anti-ricochet tilt cap. Produced under licence by US as M728 and used in the Swedish Army as 61 mm Slpprj m/66

=== Armour-piercing fin-stabilized discarding sabot (APFSDS) ===
There are different ways to measure penetration value. NATO uses a criterion that 50% of the shell has to go through the plate, while the Soviet/Russian standard is higher as 80% had to go through. According to authorities like Paul Lakowski, the difference in performance can reach as much as 8%

Designation	Origin	Designer & producer	Year	Overall length	Overall weight	Penetrator material / mass	Penetrator L:D ratio	Propellant type & weight	Chamber pressure	Muzzle velocity	Velocity drop	Sub-projectile weight without sabot / with sabot	Perforation at normal and oblique incidences	Notes
M735	United States	Teledyne Firth Stirling	1978	963 mm	17.91 kg	Tungsten alloy X11 (core) / 2.16 kg with maraging steel jacket		5.67 kg of M30	415 MPa	1501 m/s	67 m/s (at 1000 m) 133 m/s (at 2000 m)	3.72 kg / 5.797 kg	NATO Heavy Single target at 2930 m (1307 m/s)	First serial production APFSDS of the United States. Developed from the 152 mm XM578E1 APFSDS, with increased core length and mass, as well as projectile body length.
M735A1	United States	Primex Technologies	1979	963 mm		depleted uranium alloy (core) / 2.2 kg		5.67 kg of M30		1501 m/s			≈370 mm at 0° at 1000 m	A further modification of M735, using a depleted uranium core instead of the tungsten alloy core. Never fielded by the U.S. military.
M774	United States	Primex Technologies	1980	908.05 mm	17.146 kg	Depleted Uranium alloy / 3.4 kg		5.89 kg of M30		1509 m/s	67 m/s (at 1000 m) 134 m/s (at 2000 m)	3.61 kg / 5.775 kg	189 mm at 60° at 1000 m (Note: Terminal ballistic characteristics of the XM774 28 mm subprojectile with a muzzle velocity of 1524 m/s)	First US monobloc penetrator.
M833	United States	Primex Technologies	1983	998.7 mm	17.32 kg	Depleted uranium alloy / 3.665 kg	17.7:1	5.8 kg of M30		1494 m/s	54 m/s (at 1000 m) 107 m/s (at 2000 m)	/ 6.192 kg	420 mm LoS at 60° at 2000 m	Second production monobloc round for the 105 mm M68 gun produced by the US, had an increased length to diameter ratio.
M900A1	United States	Primex Technologies	1991	1003 mm	18.5 kg	Depleted uranium alloy / 3.83 kg or 4.246 kg	26.2:1	M43 LOVA		1505 m/s		/ 6.86 kg		Compared to the cancelled XM900 prototype, the M900A1 uses a new sabot, penetrator, and propellant. Designed for the M68A1 and M68A1E4 guns.
FP105	United States	Flinchbaugh Company & General Defense Corporation	1980s	927 mm	18 kg	tungsten alloy		6.1 kg of M30 or NQ-M044	410 MPa	1485 m/s with NQ/M propellant 1510 m/s with M30 propellant		3.6 kg / 5.8 kg	NATO Heavy Single target in excess of 4000 m and NATO Heavy triple target at 65° obliquity in excess of 6000 m	Similar design to the M774, also known as C-76 or C-76A1 in Canada.
C127	United States/Canada	Olin Ordnance Ammunition and SNC Industrial Technologies Inc	1991 or 1992			tungsten alloy		6 kg of Olin cool-burnin BALL or M30 (optional)	411 MPa	1555 m/s-1560 m/s		3.44 kg / 5.8 kg	152 mm at 72° obliquity, 470 mm at 0° obliquity, both at range of 2000 m	
CMC 105	United States	Chamberlain Manufacturing Corporation	early 1990s	998.73 mm	17.15 kg	tungsten alloy / 3.31 kg	19.9:1	6.1 kg of M30	415 MPa	1501 m/s	55 m/s	3.56 kg / 5.8 kg	NATO Heavy Single target at 4000 m and Heavy Triple at 5700 m or 178 mm at 67° obliquity at range about 2600 m	The latest private venture 105 mm APFSDS-T to be developed by the Chamberlain Manufacturing Corporation.
M111 Hetz-6	Israel	IMI	1978	885 mm	18.7 kg	tungsten alloy	9.9:1 (including wads)	5.8 kg of M30 M	420 MPa; 436 MPa (max)	1455 m/s	48 m/s (at 1000 m)	4.2 kg / 6.275 kg	NATO Heavy Single target at 2000 m or 150 mm at 60° obliquity at 2000 m or NATO Single Heavy at 4200 m	Produced under licence by Diehl in Germany and in Switzerland. Known as DM23 in the Bundeswehr, Pfeil Pat 78 Lsp in the Swiss Army and 33 mm Slpprj m/80 in the Swedish Army. Also produced by China, designated DTW1-105.
M413 Hetz-7	Israel	IMI	1985	990 mm	18.7 kg	tungsten alloy		5.8 kg		1450 m/s or 1455 m/s	52 m/s (at 1000 m)	4.1 kg / 6.3 kg	NATO Heavy Single target at 6000 m	Produced under licence by Diehl in Germany as DM33, also known as PPTFS M/85 LS in the Danish Army and under the CL260 designation on the export market.
M429	Israel	IMI	c. 1987			tungsten alloy				1450 m/s			Relatively equal performance to the M833	Also known as FS Mk. 2 Improved in the South African Army or CL3108 (export designation).
M426 Hetz-10	Israel	IMI	1990	990 mm	19.2 kg	tungsten alloy		6 kg of M26	440 MPa (nominal)	1433 m/s or 1450 m/s		/ 6.6 kg	450 mm or 470 mm at 2000 m	Produced under licence by Diehl in Germany as DM63. Also known as FS Mk. 3 in the South African Army. Also used in modified versions by the Swedish Army (Slpprj m/90C and m/90S).
M428 SWORD	Israel	IMI	2003	1000 mm	18.8 kg	tungsten alloy		5.8 kg of NC-NG		1505 m/s				
24 mm slpprj m/90C	Israel/Sweden	IMI	1990	Ca 1000 mm	19.6 kg	tungsten alloy		6 kg of NC-NG CEP-2	460 MPa	1481 m/s		4.4 kg / 6 kg		Modified version of the Israeli M426 APFSDS.
24 mm slpprj m/90S	Israel/Sweden	IMI	1990	Ca 985 mm	19.6 kg	tungsten alloy		6 kg of NC-NG CEP-2	460 MPa	1560 m/s (Note: When fired from the longer Swedish Bofors L74 105 mm L/62 gun.)		4.1 kg / 6 kg		Shortened variant (by 15.5 mm) of the Slpprj m/90C with a modified sabot to fit in the Strv 103 autoloader.
OFL 105 F1	France	GIAT	1981	985 mm	17.1 kg	18 density tungsten alloy	14.4:1	5.85 kg of B19T		1495 m/s (Note: 1525 m when fired from the longer French F1 105 mm L/56 gun.)	60 m/s (at 1000 m)	3.8 kg / 5.8 kg	NATO Heavy Single target at 4400 m, (Note: 4900 m when fired from the longer French F1 105 mm L/56 gun.) NATO Heavy Triple target at 5000 m (Note: 5500 m when fired from the longer French F1 105 mm L/56 gun.); 392 mm at point-blank range, 370 mm at 1000 m, (Note: When fired from the longer French F1 105 mm L/56 gun.)	Fitted with small bearing balls inside its hollow ballistic cap for improved beyond-armour effects against light armoured vehicles.
OFL 105 G2	France	GIAT	c. 1987	985 mm	18 kg	tungsten-nickel-iron alloy	>21:1	5.85 kg of Wimmis		1490 m/s (Note: 1525 m when fired from the longer French F1 105 mm L/56 gun)	138 m/s (at 2000 m)	4.2 kg / 6.2 kg	NATO Heavy Single target at 6200 m, (Note: 6800 m when fired from the longer French F1 105 mm L/56 gun) NATO Heavy Triple target at 7800 m (Note: 8400 m when fired from the longer French F1 105 mm L/56 gun); 487 mm at point-blank range	The OFL 105 G2 uses a high energetic Swiss-made Wimmis double base propellant.
OFL 105 G3	France	GIAT	c. 1987	985 mm		tungsten-nickel-iron alloy	>21:1	5.85 kg of B19T (single-base)		1460 m/s (Note: 1490 m when fired from the longer French F1 105 mm L/56 gun)		4.2 kg / 6.2 kg	NATO Heavy Single target at 5600 m, (Note: 6200 m when fired from the longer French F1 105 mm L/56 gun) NATO Heavy Triple target at 7200 m (Note: 7800 m when fired from the longer French F1 105 mm L/56 gun); 469 mm at point-blank range	Cheaper variant (15%) of the OFL 105 G2 employing the standard SNPE poudre B propellant.
OFL 105 F2	France	Giat Industries	1995	990 mm	18 kg	depleted uranium		5.827 kg of GB19T (double-base)		1525 m/s (Note: when fired from the longer French F1 105 mm L/56 gun)		/ 6.25 kg	520 mm or 540 mm at 2000 m	OFL 105 G2 variant with a depleted uranium penetrator.
L64A4	United Kingdom	ROF Birtley	1982 (L64A4)	948 mm	18.91 kg	tungsten alloy		5.62 kg of WNC LM1900	426 MPa (nominal); 511 MPa (max)	1480 m/s-1490 m/s		3.59 kg / 6.12 kg	NATO Heavy Single target at 4200 m, NATO Heavy Triple target at 4800 m	28 mm penetrator
H6/62	United Kingdom	ROF	1987	990 mm	18.5 kg	tungsten-nickel-iron alloy		5.62 kg of WNC LM1900	426 MPa (nominal); 511 MPa (max)	1490 m/s	55 m/s (1000 m)	3.59 kg / 6.12 kg	NATO Heavy Single target at 5000 m, NATO Heavy Triple targetat 6000 m, 360 mm at 2000 m	25 mm penetrator
T-2-series	United Kingdom	Royal Ordnance Speciality Metals	1994	1030 mm	19 kg	tungsten-nickel-iron alloy	23:1	multi-base granular		1420 m/s	48 m/s (1000 m)	30 to 40% greater than that of current 105 mm APFSDS rounds	540 mm RHA at 2000 m	Designed to be exclusively fired by the high pressure Royal Ordnance Improved Weapon System (IWS), the T-2-series APFSDS features a stub brass cartridge case and a combustible sleeve, penetrator diameter is 28 mm for a length-to-diameter ratio of 23:1.
DM43	Germany	Rheinmetall	late 1980s or early 1990s	941 mm	18 kg	tungsten alloy			420 MPa	1475 m/s		4.3 kg / 6.1 kg or 6.3 kg	NATO triple heavy target at 5500 m	
NP105A2	Austria	Ennstaler Metallwerk GmBH (designer) Noricum (producer)	1984	980 mm	19.3 kg	tungsten-nickel-iron, Tungalloy T-176FA alloy			435 MPa (nominal); 495 MPa (max)	1485 m/s	72 m/s (1000 m); 128 m/s (2000 m)	3.7 kg /	NATO Heavy Single Target at 5800 m, NATO Heavy Triple target at 6500 m and 473 mm at 1000 m or 127 mm of HD9 armour plate at 73° at unknown range.	
HP 105 A2M	Austria	Hirtenberger AG				T 176 tungsten alloy		105-SCDB multitubular propellant	430 MPa	1535 m/s			NATO Heavy Single Target at more than 7000 m, NATO Heavy Triple target at 7500 m	
C-437	Spain	Empresa Nacional Bazán and Santa Bárbara Sistemas	1984	928 mm	18 kg	tungsten alloy		5.85 kg of B19T		1485 m/s (Note: when fired from the longer French F1 105 mm L/56 gun)		/ 5.65 kg	NATO Heavy Triple target and the Heavy Single target, both at 5000 m	Fitted with three DENAL wads under the windshield and around the penetrator core to prepare the penetration zone and prevents rebound from armour on impact at high angles of incidence. The penetration hole is between 60 and 70 mm in diameter.
C-512	Spain	Santa Bárbara Sistemas		996 mm	18 kg	tungsten alloy		5.7 kg of B19T	345 MPa	1480 m/s (Note: when fired from the longer French F1 105 mm L/56 gun)		/ 5.925 kg	NATO Heavy Triple target at 4550 m and 120 mm target at 70° at 3500 m	the C-512 is similar to the C-437 but use a slightly longer and heavier penetrator
NR 331	Belgium	PRB	1980s			tungsten alloy								
M1001	Belgium	Mecar	1980s			tungsten alloy				1525 m/s		3.8 kg / 5.8 kg		is equivalent in performance to the FP105 APFSDS
M1050	Belgium	MECAR	late 1980s-early 1990s	927 mm	17.7 kg	tungsten alloy				1510 m/s		/ 5.8 kg		is equivalent in performance to the FP105 APFSDS
M1060A1	Belgium	MECAR	1995	980 mm	18 kg	tungsten-nickel-iron alloy				1510 m/s		/ 5.8 kg	400 mm RHA at 60° LoS at 2000 m	Has comparable performance to the US M833 but without the problems associated with depleted uranium
M1060A2	Belgium	MECAR	late 1990s	990 mm	18.5 kg	tungsten alloy		5.9 kg		1450 m/s-1460 m/s (Note: 1490 m when fired from the longer French F1 105 mm L/56 gun)		/ 6.2 kg	440 mm RHA at 60° LoS at 2000 m"105mm TK APFSDS-T M1060A2" (PDF). Nexter. 2018. Archived from the original (PDF) on 2021-12-29.	This model of KE is a major product improvement of the MECAR M1060A1 APFSDS-T.
M1060A3	Belgium	MECAR	2004	1000 mm	18.7 kg	tungsten alloy		6.2 kg of JA2		1560 m/s (Note: 1590 m/s when fired from the longer French F1 105 mm L/56 gun)		/ 6.2 kg	500 mm RHA at 60° LoS at 2000 m	
M1060CV	Belgium	MECAR	2004			tungsten alloy		6.2 kg of SCDB		1620 m/s		/ 6.2 kg	560 mm RHA at 60° LoS at 2000 m	Designed for use with the Cockerill 105HP high-pressure gun.
XC127 Excalibur	United States/France/United Kingdom	Primex Technologies, Giat Industries and RO Defence.	1990s	1010 mm		tungsten alloy X27X / 3.18 kg		6 kg of BALL	411 MPa (ball) to 414 MPa (granular)	1560 m/s		/ 5.8 kg	≥480 mm RHA at 0° obliquity or 150 mm RHA at 72° both at 2000 m	Exhibits similar penetration performance to the first generation of 120 mm APFSDS rounds.
Type 93	Japan	Daikin	1993	983 mm	17.7 kg	tungsten alloy		6.2 kg		1501 m/s		3.4 kg / 5.8 kg	430 mm at 2000 m	
M9718	South Africa	Denel		950 mm	18.5 kg	tungsten alloy			350 to 400 MPa				450 mm at 3000 m	
K270	South Korea	Poongsan Corporation and Daewoo Corporation	1980s			tungsten alloy				1508 m/s	52 m/s	/ 5.36 kg	152 mm at 60° obliquity at 3000 m	
K273	South Korea	Poongsan Corporation and Daewoo Corporation	late 1980s or early 1990s			tungsten alloy								The K273 penetrator has a greater diameter-to-length ratio than that of the K270.
K274	South Korea	Poongsan Corporation	1998	1001 mm	18.7 kg	tungsten alloy		M30	461.9 MPa	1495 m/s		/ 6.23 kg	225 mm at 60° obliquity at 2000 m 480 mm at 3000 m	
K274N	South Korea	Poongsan Corporation	2002			tungsten alloy (2.4 kg)		SCDB		1550 m/s			>500 mm at 60° obliquity at 2000 m	
105 mm FSAPDS	India	Indian Ordnance Factory Board (designer) and Ordnance factory of Khamaria Complex (producer)	1996			tungsten alloy		4.3 kg or 5.1 kg		1450 m/s		/ 6.3 kg	150 mm at 60° obliquity at 1300 m	
APFS DS 105mm	Pakistan	National Development Complex (NDC)	2001			depleted uranium				1450 m/s			more than 450 mm at unknown range	
P1A1	Pakistan	Pakistan Ordnance Factories (POF)				tungsten alloy		5.62 kg of NQM046	434 MPa	1490 m/s		3.59 kg / 6.12 kg	300 mm at 0° obliquity at unknown range	Licensed version of the British L64 APFSDS.
DTW2	China	NORINCO	before 2006	1066 mm	18.8 kg	tungsten alloy		5.9 kg of SD16 + SD16A	511 MPa (max)	1530 m/s (Note: when fired from the longer Chinese ZPL-94, 98 and 151 L/62 guns)		3.775 kg / 6 kg	150 mm at 71° obliquity at 2000 m	Also known under 105-II designation.
BTA2	China	NORINCO		1100 mm	18.8 kg	tungsten alloy		5.8 kg		1540 m/s (Note: when fired from the longer Chinese ZPL-94, 98 and 151 L/62 guns)	40 m/s (at 1000 m)	/ 5.9 kg	220 mm at 66° obliquity at 2000 m	BTA2 is an export designation.
Anti tank 105 mm APFSDS – T	Iran	Defense Industries Organization (DIO)	2010s		19 kg	tungsten alloy						/ 5.3 kg	460 mm at unknown range	

=== High explosive anti-tank (HEAT) ===
Designation	Origin	Designer & producer	Year	Type	Weight, complete round (kg)	Projectile weight (kg)	Explosive filling (kg)	Muzzle velocity (m/s)	Perforation at normal and oblique incidences	Notes
OCC 105 F1	France		early 1960s	non-rotating	22.2 kg	10.95 kg	0.78 kg of HBX	1000 m/s	400 mm or 152 mm @ 64° at any range	The outer shell is suspended around the warhead by ball bearings, allowing it to rotate in flight while the warhead remains at a very low rate of rotation, circumventing the detrimental effects of rotation to HEAT warheads while retaining in-flight stability.
M456 HEAT-T (Note: T refers to the round containing a tracer element.)	United States		1961 (M456); 1966 (M456A1); 1980 (M456A2)	fin-stabilized	21.8 kg	10.2 kg	0.97 kg of Composition B	1173.5 m/s	175 mm @ 60° at any range	On detonation, viable anti-personnel fragments are scattered over a radius of at least 15 m. The M456A2 differs mainly in having a different method of fixing the nose impact switch assembly so that the warhead will detonate on graze or shoulder impact on any part of the projectile body. Produced under license by Japan as Type 91 HEAT-MP and by Germany as DM12.
M152/6	Israel		2000s	fin-stabilized						M152/3 (licence-built M456) upgraded with an airburst fuze
	Spain/Germany	DEFTEC	1992	fin-stabilized	22 kg	10 kg	1.4 kg or 1.5 kg	1174 m/s		Visually similar to the US M456 round but includes a detonation wave shaper for increased armour penetration. Also has a greater fragmentation effect.
L51 HEAT-T	Italy	Simmel Difesa		fin-stabilized	22.1 kg	10.25 kg	0.97 kg of Composition B	1173 m/s	superior than the standard M456A1 model	
CH-105-MZ HEAT-T	Spain	Santa Bárbara Sistemas		fin-stabilized	22 kg	10.3 kg	1.25 kg of HWC 94.5/4.5/1	1173 m/s	443 mm of RHA at any range	
DTP1A	China	NORINCO	2012	fin-stabilized	22 kg			1154 m/s		visually similar to the US M456 projectile but incorporates an anti-ERA feature

=== High-explosive squash head (HESH) ===
High-Explosive Squash Head (HESH) / High explosive plastic (HEP) (Note: "High Explosive Plastic" is the US term for HESH.)
Designation	Origin	Year	Weight, complete round	Projectile weight	Explosive filling	Muzzle velocity	Notes
L35 HESH	United Kingdom	1962 (L35A2)	20.02 kg	11.35 kg	5.1 kg of Composition A-3 (L35A1); 1.97 kg of Hexogen	732 m/s	used by the Swedish army as Slspgr m/61
M393 HEP-T	United States	1965 (M393A1)	21.2 kg	11.3 kg	2.86 kg of Composition A-3 (M393A1); 2.994 kg of Composition A-3 (M393A2) 3.25 kg of Composition A-3 (M393A3)	731.5 m/s	Produced under license by Japan as Type75 HEP-T and by Germany as DM502
M156 HESH-T (HEP-T)	Israel		21.2 kg	11.3 kg	2.2 kg of Composition A-3	731 m/s	Equivalent to the L35 HESH-T and M393A1/A2 HEP-T

=== High explosive (HE) ===
Designation	Origin	Year	Weight, complete round	Projectile mass	Explosive filling	Muzzle velocity	Notes
OE 105 F1	France	1960	21 kg	12.1 kg	2 kg of RDX/TNT	770 m/s	Has been referred as the OC 105 or OE Modèle 60 in the past.
Slsgr m/61A	Sweden	1960	24.37 kg	15.5 kg	1.83 kg of TNT	650 m/s	680 m/s out of Strv 103's L/62 barrel.
10,5 Pz Kan 60/61 St G Mz 54 Lsp	Switzerland			16.0 kg		600 m/s	
M110 HE-MP-T	Israel		23.5 kg	13.6 kg	≈1 kg of CLX66	800 m/s	Capable of penetrating double reinforced concrete walls >200mm, its electronic fuze has three modes
M9210	South Africa		24.5 kg		TNT/HNS	700 m/s	17 m lethal radius, maximum range 10–12 km
MKE Mod 233	Turkey		24.505 kg		1.99 kg of TNT	683 m/s	Max range 11 km
P1A1 HE/TK	Pakistan		28.11 kg	16.6 kg	1.9 kg of TNT	850 m/s	Maximum range : 14.5 km
DTB2 105	China						

=== Smoke shells ===
Designation	Origin	Year	Weight, complete round	Projectile mass	Muzzle velocity	Filling	Notes
L39A SMK	United Kingdom	1961 or 1962	26.47 kg	19.6 kg	330 m/s	3.3 kg of hexachloroethane and zinc oxide	Used by the Swedish army as Rökgr m/61
M416 WP-T	United States	1960s	20.7 kg (45 lb 10 oz)	11.4 kg (25 lb 2 oz)	732 m/s	2.72 kg of white phosphorus	
OFUM PH 105 F1	France	1960s	18.5 kg (40 lb 13 oz)	12.1 kg (26 lb 11 oz)	695 m/s	1.77 kg of white phosphorus + 0.12 kg hexolite burster charge	75 m-wide smoke screen for 40 seconds

=== Anti-personnel ===
Designation	Origin	Year	Type	Weight, complete round	Projectile mass	Muzzle velocity	Filling	Notes
L15A1 CAN	United Kingdom		canister					
M1204	Belgium		canister	19.5 kg (43 lb 0 oz)	8.3 kg	1,173 m/s (3,850 ft/s)	1130 steel spheres of a diameter of 11 mm	200 m (660 ft) effective range
M494 APERS-T	United States	1967	beehive	24.94 kg (55 lb 0 oz)	14 kg (30 lb 14 oz)	821 m/s	5000 0.8 g steel flechettes and a dye marker	
M1040	United States		canister	23.9 kg (52 lb 11 oz)		1,041 m/s (3,420 ft/s)	2080 tungsten spheres	300 m (980 ft) effective range
TC800	Australia	early 1990s	canister				800 cylindrical pellets, each measuring 12.7 mm×12.7 mm	cone-shaped dispersion within a 10° angle out to a maximum range of 300 m
APAM-MP-T M117/1	Israel	2000s	cluster	24.7 kg	14.4 kg	800 m/s	6 submunitions	APAM-MP-T
M436 STUN	Israel	2000s	less-than-lethal	14.4 kg (31 lb 12 oz)	2.5 kg (5 lb 8 oz)		plastic flakes	Flash, bang and blast effects. "less-than-lethal" cartridge

=== Illuminating ===
Designation	Origin	Year	Weight, complete round	Projectile mass	Filling	Muzzle Velocity	Effect	Notes
OECL 105 F1	France	late 1960s	20.5 kg	11.5 kg or 11.7 kg	0.46 kg of illuminant	275 m/s	Illuminates 300 m diameter area with more than 5 lux and a 900 m diameter area with more than 1 lux for 35 seconds.	
DM16	Germany		22.7 kg	16 kg		280 m/s		

=== Gun launched anti-tank guided missile (GLATGM) ===
Ammunition	Origin	Designer & producer	Year	Weight, complete round	Missile mass	Muzzle velocity	Cruise speed	Range	Warhead	Perforation at normal and oblique incidences	Guidance system	Notes
FALARICK 105	Ukraine/Belgium	CMI Defence and Luch Design Bureau	2010s	24 kg			subsonic	5000 m	tandem HEAT	>550 mm	semi-automatic laser beam-riding	
LAHAT	Israel	Israel Aerospace Industries (IAI)	1990s	16 kg	13 kg	300 m/s	280 m/s	6000 m (direct fire)	2.5 kg tandem HEAT with optional delay function		semi-active laser guided (direct fire or indirect fire mode)	
Excalibur	Israel	Israel Military Industries (IMI)	2000s	23 kg		750 m/s					infrared or millimeter-wave radar	
Spear	Germany	Diehl Stiftung & Co, Krauss-Maffei Wegmann and KPB Instrument Design Bureau	1999	25.4 kg				5500 m	tandem HEAT warhead	750 mm	semi-automatic laser beam riding	
GP105	China	NORINCO	2016		19.8 kg			5000 m	tandem HEAT warhead	660 mm with ERA	semi-automatic laser beam riding	Also called GP2.

== 105 mm guns using 105x617mm ammunition ==
- L7-series (United Kingdom)
- M68-series (United States)
- M35 (United States)
- CN 105 F1 (France)
- CN 105 G2 (France)
- 10,5 cm Pz Kan 61 (Switzerland)
- L74 (Sweden)
- Rh 105-series (Germany)
- OTO 105 Low Recoil Force Gun (Italy)
- Cockerill 105HP (Belgium)
- GT 3 (South Africa)
- GT 7 (South Africa)
- GT 8 (South Africa)
- FRT L51 (Argentina)
- Type 94 and other L7-derived Chinese designs (China)
- Type 15 (China)
- IWS (United Kingdom)
