= AMX-32 =

French main battle tank

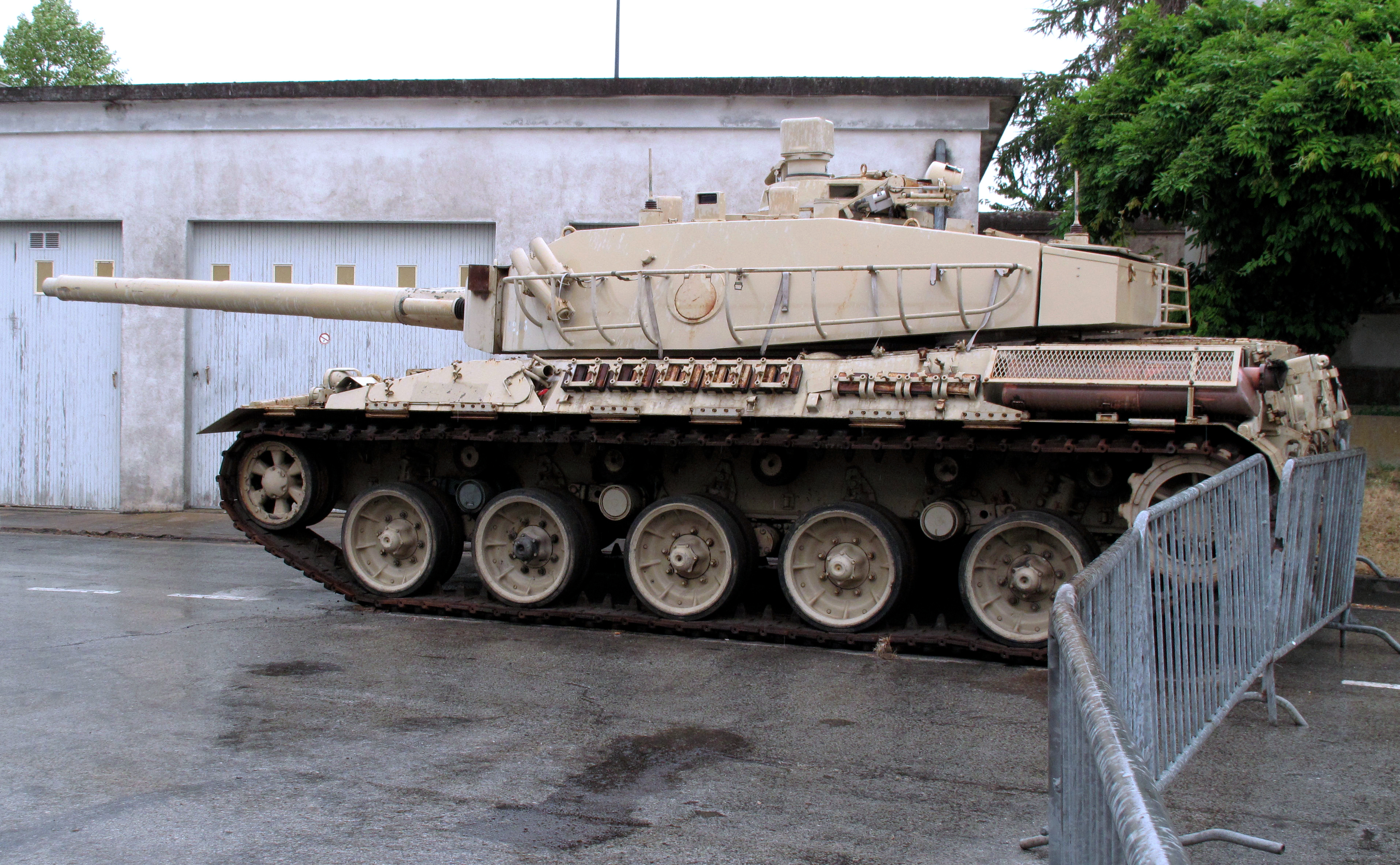
- AMX-32 on display at the museum of the armoured vehicles of Saumur.
- Type: Main battle tank
- Place of origin: France

Production history
- Designed: 1975–1979
- No. built: 2 prototypes

Specifications
- Mass: 38 tonnes (42 short tons; 37 long tons) (1st prototype); 40 tonnes (44 short tons; 39 long tons) (2nd prototype)
- Length: 9.45 m (31 ft 0 in) (gun forward)
- Width: 3.1 m (10 ft 2 in)
- Height: 2.29 m (7 ft 6 in) (roof)
- Crew: 4 (commander, gunner, loader, driver)
- Armor: spaced armour
- Main armament: CN 105 F1 rifled gun or a 120 mm CN 120-25 smoothbore tank gun
- Secondary armament: 1× 20 mm M693 autocannon 1× 7.62 mm AAN F1 machine gun
- Engine: Hispano-Suiza HS-110-2-SR; 800 hp (600 kW)-800 hp (600 kW)
- Power/weight: 20 hp/tonne
- Transmission: SESM Minerva ENC 200 (automatic, 5 fwd & 5 rev)
- Suspension: Torsion bar with shock absorbers
- Operational range: 530 km (330 mi)
- Maximum speed: 65 km/h (40 mph)

The AMX-32 was a French main battle tank developed by AMX and APX in the late 1970s during the Cold War as an export tank based on the AMX-30 to fit in a specific market niche of nations with smaller defence budgets. While two prototypes were built, it failed to garner interest for foreign sales and was discontinued and replaced by the AMX-40, another unsuccessful development of the AMX-30 and AMX-32.

== Armour ==
The mantlet, the turret sides and the hull noseplate of the AMX-32 are hollow, the outer layers are made of dual hardness steel plates which are particularly effective against kinetic energy projectiles.

The frontal armour of the AMX-32 was successfully tested against 57 mm armour-piercing rounds of the ASU-57 at 500 m range and 75 mm tungsten-cored PCOT rounds fired from the AMX-13 light tank at 1000 m range. The turret side armour can withstand impacts of 23 mm armour-piercing rounds. The turret roof has been thickened to be protected from autocannons shells fired by fighter-bombers at a steep angle of 30°.

In addition, the AMX-32 features six smoke grenade dischargers and a dense white smoke screen can be generated by injecting vaporized diesel fuel into the exhaust system.

== Fire control and observation ==
Turret traverse and main gun elevation are powered by an electro-hydraulic drive. The main gun can be stabilized through servo-control; using inputs sent by the stabilized mirror head of the commander's M527 panoramic sight.

=== Gunner ===
The gunner uses an APX M581 telescopic sight with ×10 magnification with a built-in APX M550 laser rangefinder (a.k.a. CILAS TCV 80). The possibility of misalignment are reduced as the sight is an integral part of the mantlet. A Thomson CSF DIVT-13 low light television camera (LLLTV) with a ×1 magnification allows night observation up to 1200 m. The image obtained is displayed on two TV monitors (gunner and commander). The gunner also has two episcopes for direct observation.

=== Commander ===
The commander has the latest iteration of the TOP 7 cupola with eight episcopes. Each episcope has a button placed under it allowing to quickly bring his sight toward the observed area. A SFIM M527 gyrostabilized panoramic sight with three channels; two daylight (×2 and ×8) and one night (×1) with light intensification allowing night observation up to 300–400 m.

=== Loader ===
The loader has at his disposal one left-facing episcope and two rotating periscopes.

== Mobility ==
The AMX-32 was powered by a 24,790 cc (1,513 cu in) 800 horsepower (600 kW) Hispano-Suiza (then Renault) HS-110-2-SR diesel engine fitted with twin Holset turbochargers and intercooler. The engine is coupled to an automatic, power shifting, SESM Minerva ENC 200 transmission with five forward and reverse gears.

== Prototypes ==
- P1 : presented to the public for the first time in June 1979 at Satory VII Exhibition of Military Equipment and Weapons. Like the AMX-30, it retained a cast gun mantlet with a CN-105-F1 105 mm gun. In 1980, it was fitted with a modified turret featuring a new welded mantlet.
- P2 : displayed at Satory VIII arms fair in 1981, the shape of the hull front was modified to improve its ballistic protection. Due to the previous changes, the combat weight of the AMX-32 increased to 40 tonnes.

== See also ==
- History of the tank
- AMX-40
