= Hexolite =

Hexolite can refer to the following explovie compounds:

- RDX – also called hexogen, cyclonite
- Composition B – also called hexotol
