= CN 105 F1 =

French-made weapon

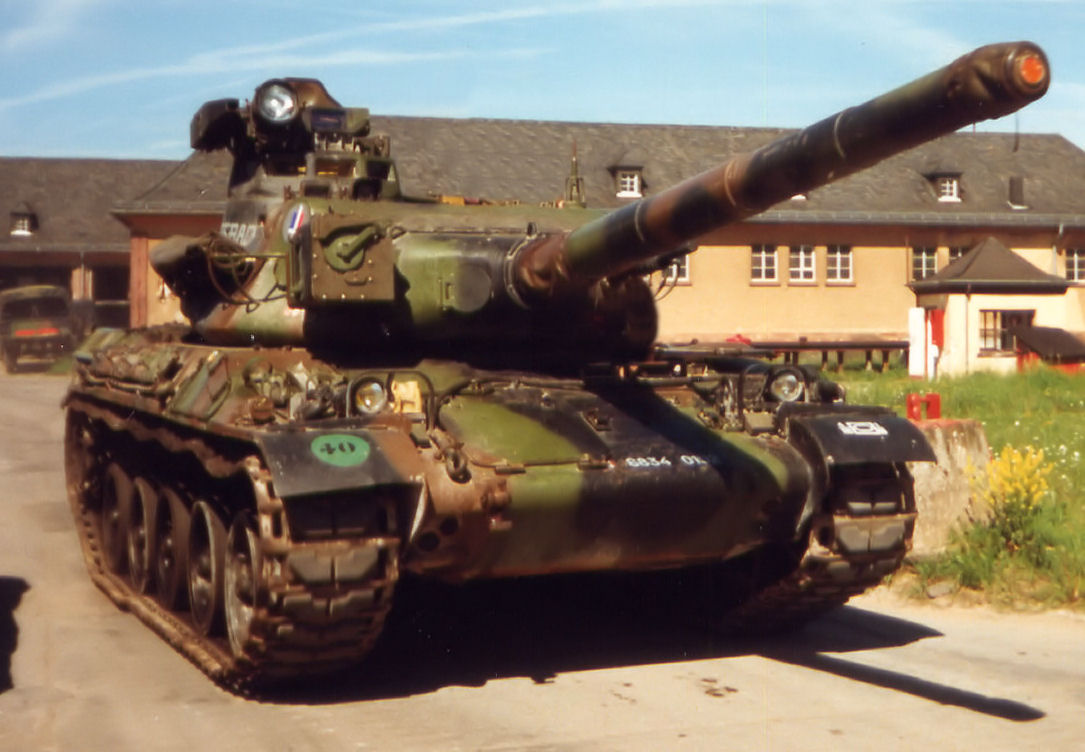
- A French AMX-30B2 sporting a 105 rifled tank gun
- Type: Tank gun
- Place of origin: France

Service history
- In service: 1966–present
- Used by: Bosnia, Chile, Croatia, Cyprus, France, Greece, Israel, Qatar, Saudi Arabia, Spain, United Arab Emirates, Venezuela
- Wars: Gulf War

Production history
- Designed: 1962

Specifications
- Mass: 2,470 kg
- Length: 5.90 metres (19.4 ft)
- Crew: 2 (gunner, loader)
- Shell: 105×617mmR
- Calibre: 105 mm (4.134 in)
- Breech: vertical sliding wedge
- Recoil: 385 mm
- Elevation: -8° to +20°
- Traverse: 360°
- Muzzle velocity: 1000 m/s with HEAT round 1525 m/s with APFSDS round
- Effective firing range: 5000 m
- Sights: M271 coaxial telescope

The Canon de 105 mm modèle F1 (or CN-105-F1) is a French 105 mm tank gun used with the AMX-30.

== History ==
The CN 105 F1 was designed at the end of the 1950s by the arsenal of Bourges (EFAB) under the project name D1512, its development was completed in 1962 and the gun was registered as 105 Mle 62 (an abbreviated version of 105 mm 1962 Model) which in turn took the designation of CN 105 F1 after being fitted with its armored gun mantlet.

As the French Army was relying on the OCC 105 F1 (Note: This projectile was composed of two major parts, including the outer shell and a suspended inner shell, divided by ball bearings. This allowed the projectile to be spin-stabilized, and therefore more accurate than a normal fin-stabilized HEAT-round, while the inner shell did not move, allowing the warhead to work at maximum efficiency.) (obus G) as main as its only armor-piercing ammunition at that time, the rifling of CN 105 F1 gun barrel was given a relatively slow twist of one turn in 25 calibers to minimise the spin imparted to the HEAT projectile, but this made it unsuitable for firing APDS, although compatible with all other types of NATO 105×617mm ammunition such as APFSDS, the OFL 105 F1 being the first French-made APFSDS and was fielded in November 1981.

== Design ==
The CN 105 F1 is a monoblock steel 105-millimeter (4.1 in) cannon protected from bending with a magnesium alloy thermal sleeve. The F1 is fitted with a semi-automatic vertical sliding wedge breechblock, though fitted without a muzzle brake. Unlike the similar L7 tank gun, the F1 uses a compressed air scavenging system instead of a bore evacuator. The recoil mechanism uses two symmetrically opposed hydraulic brake cylinders with a single hydropneumatic recuperator cylinder. An electrical firing system is fitted.

== Additional specifications ==
- Factory designation: D1512
- Total length: 5.9 m
- Rifling length: 5.263 m
- Rifling twist: 7°,10' right hand
- Number of grooves: 32
- Recoil mechanism: two symmetrically opposed hydraulic brake cylinders
- Recuperator: single hydropneumatic recuperator cylinder
- Recoil length: 385 mm
- Maximum recoil length: 400 mm
- Recoil force: 23 t
- Weight, overall: 2470 kg
- Recoiling gun mass: 1980 kg

== Variant ==
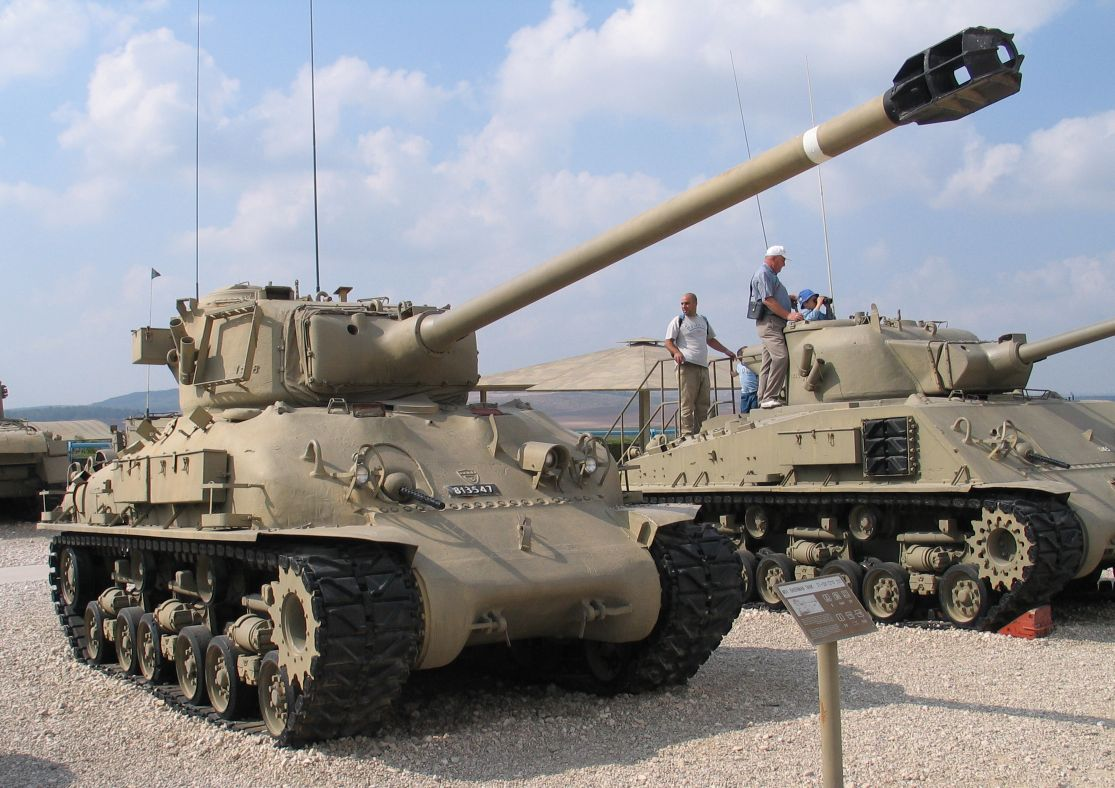
An Israeli M51 Sherman fitted with the CN 105 D1 gun. Note the large muzzle brake.

A shorter barrel version designated D1504 was fitted to Israeli M51 Shermans and locally known as the CN 105 D1, some of which have been sold to Chile. The gun saw extensive combat use in the 1967 Six Days War and the 1973 Yom Kippur War, scoring many victories in engagements with Syrian and Egyptian forces. In order to fit in the T23 turret of the M51, a larger muzzle brake was added to reduce the recoil length.

Argentina also produced a version of this gun, similar to the Israeli version, for use on their Repotenciado upgrade of ex-British Sherman Firefly tanks, known locally as the L44/57 FTR 105 mm. Although these tanks still had the original smaller Sherman turret, the extended Firefly bustle gave enough space for the recoil within a limited elevation arc, but left a very cramped turret. Ammunition was sourced from Fabricaciones Militares.

== Gallery ==
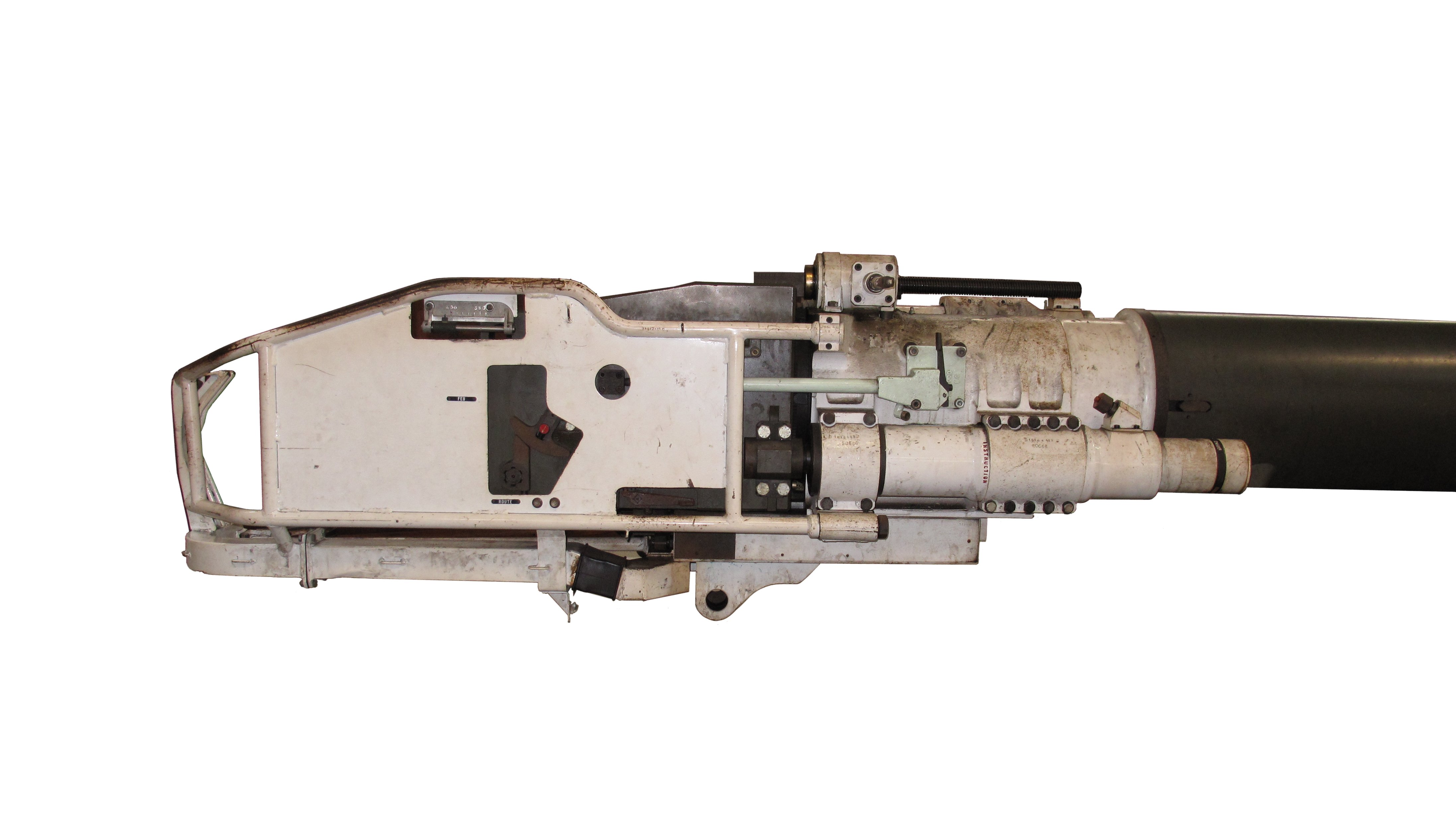
Breech

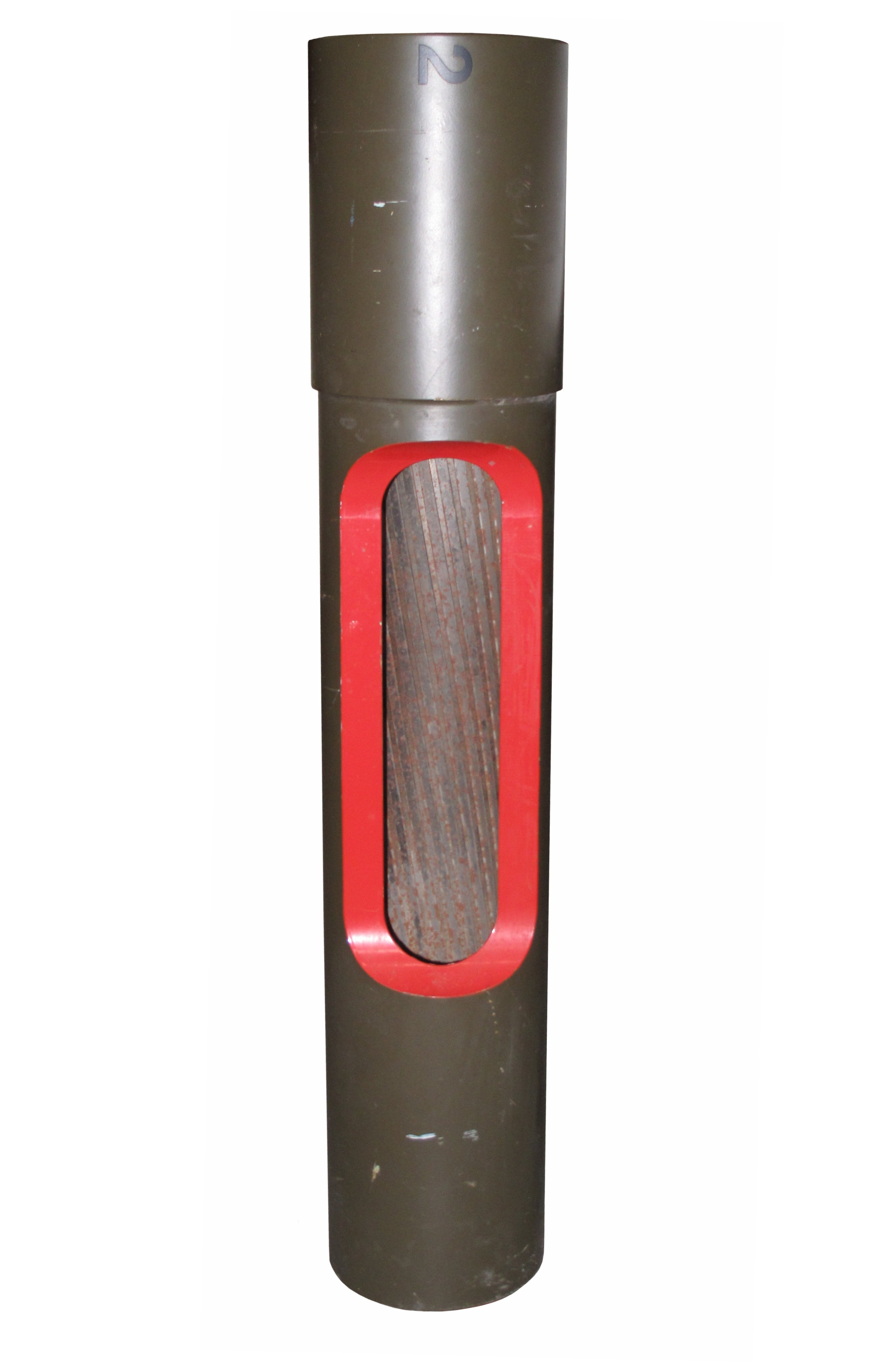
Cut-away of the gun tube, showing the rifling

French OFL 105 F1 105 mm APFSDS

== Sources ==
- Caiti, Pierangelo (1978). Modern Armour: The World's Battle Tanks Today. London: Arms and Armour Press. ISBN 0-85368-412-X.
- de Mazarrasa, Javier (1990). Carro de Combate AMX-30E (in Spanish). Aldaba Ediciones. ISBN 84-86629-29-2.
- Ferrari, Giorgio (October 1988). "The "Hows" and "Whys" of Armour Penetration". Military Technology (10/1988). Moench Verlagsgesellschaft Mbh.
- Jeudy, Jean-Gabriel (1997). Chars de France (in French). Boulogne: E.T.A.I. ISBN 2-7268-8369-9.
- Ogorkiewicz, Richard M. (December 1973). AMX-30 Battle Tank. Berkshire, United Kingdom: Profile Publications Ltd. OCLC 54349455.
