= AMX-10 =

AMX-10 may refer to:

- AMX-10P, a French infantry fighting vehicle, and variants
- AMX-10 RC, a French armoured fighting vehicle
