= LRAC F1 =

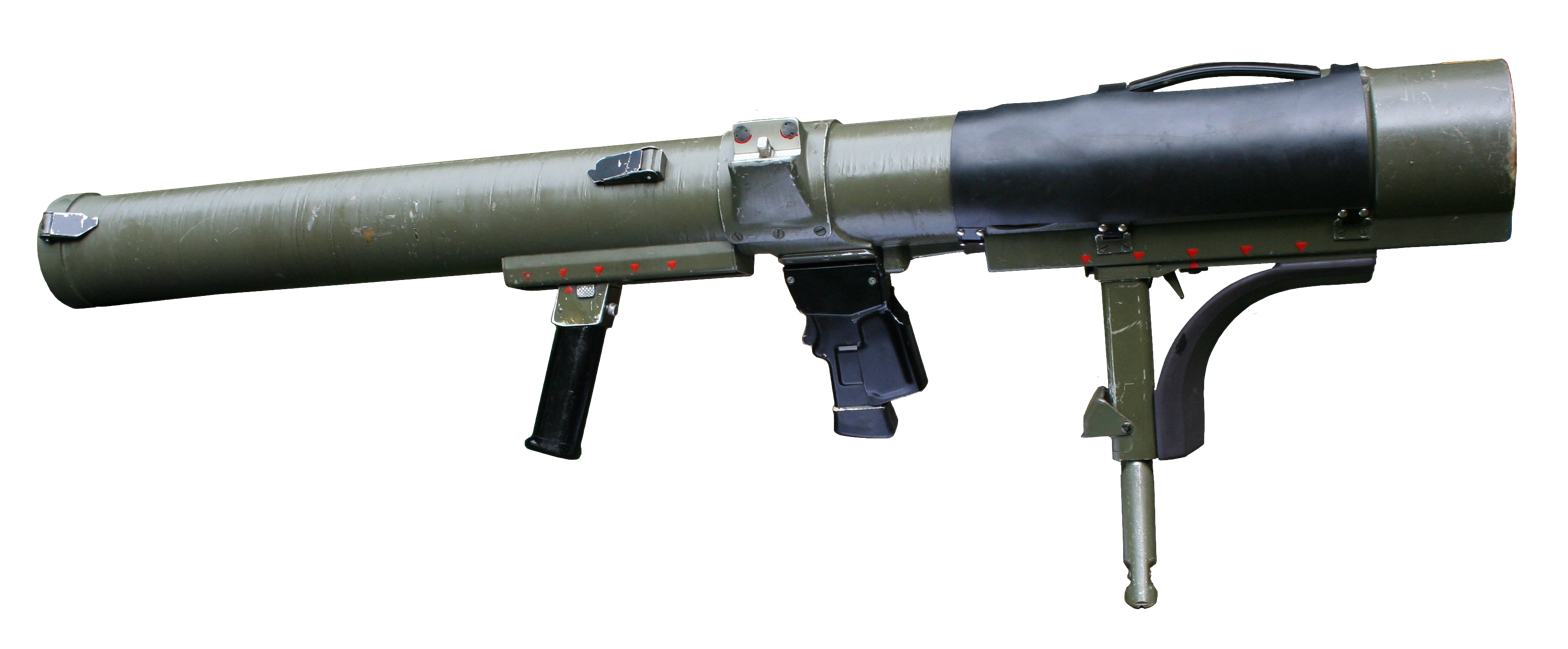
- An LRAC launch tube
- Type: Shoulder-launched missile weapon
- Place of origin: France

Service history
- Used by: See Users
- Wars: South African Border War; Angolan Civil War; Lebanese Civil War; Operation Serval

Production history
- Designer: Société technique de recherches en industries mécaniques
- Manufacturer: Manufacture Nationale d'Armes de Saint-Etienne the launcher and Luchaire SA the rocket projectile

Specifications
- Mass: 5 kg (11 lb), with sights
- Length: 1.17 m (1.28 yd)
- Crew: 2
- Caliber: 89 mm (3.5 in)
- Rate of fire: 3 to 4 rounds per minute
- Muzzle velocity: 295 m/s (970 ft/s)
- Effective firing range: 300 to 500 m (330 to 550 yd)
- Maximum firing range: 2,300 m (2,500 yd) (at 45° angle)
- Sights: APX M 290 and passive night telescope

External images
- LRAC F1 STRIM
- LRAC F1 Early Photo
- LRAC F1 with Rocket Projectile (top) AC300 Jupiter (bottom)
- Details of LRAC F1
- Cut-Away of 89mm antitank rocket
- Drawing of antitank rocket and storage/launcher container

The LRAC F1, officially called Lance-Roquettes AntiChar de 89 mm modèle F1 (89 mm anti-tank rocket launcher model F1), is a French reusable rocket launcher developed by Luchaire Défense SA, and manufactured in cooperation with Manufacture Nationale d'Armes de Saint-Étienne and was, in the 1970s, marketed by Hotchkiss-Brandt.

It replaced the 89 mm M20A1 Super Bazooka in French Army service. Through the use of fiberglass and plastic in the launcher it is over 2 kg (4.4 lb) lighter when loaded than the M20A1, while having a greater effective range. The LRAC F1 is sometimes referred to as the STRIM 89mm antitank rocket launcher from the abbreviations for the private firm Société technique de recherches en industries mécaniques that was contracted in 1964 by the French ministry of defence, to research a replacement for the M20A1 Super Bazooka.

== History ==
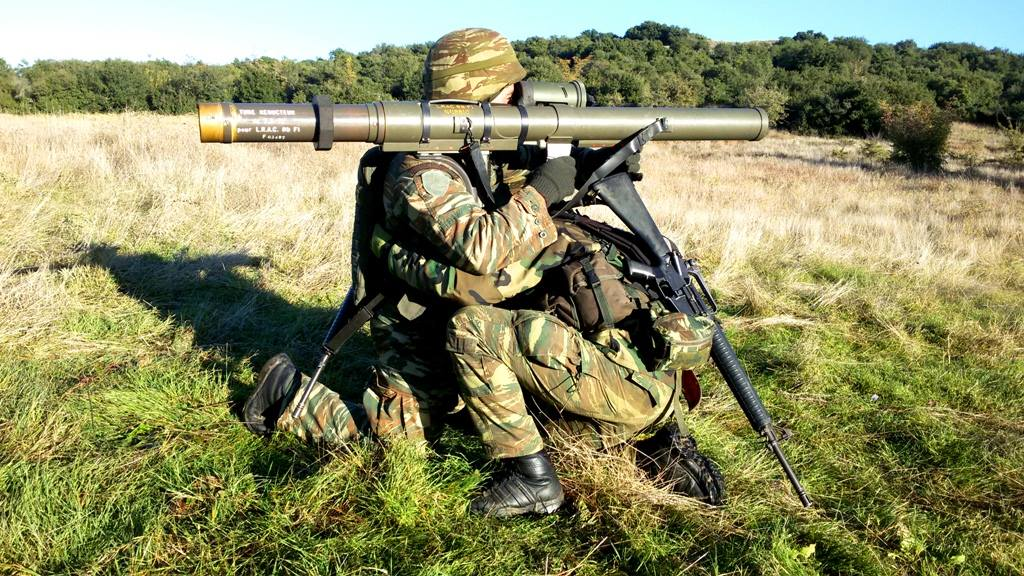
Greek special forces personnel aiming an LRAC F1 during an exercise

In the early 1970s, two antitank weapons were placed in production for evaluation by the French Army to replace the M20A1: the 80 mm ACL-APX, a recoilless cannon with a rocket-assisted projectile, and the 89 mm LRAC F1 STRIM rocket launcher. The STRIM design was chosen as the replacement for the M20A1 based on the higher penetration ability of its antitank ammunition and the much lower overall manufacturing costs compared to the 80 mm ACL-APX system.

== Operation ==
The launcher is normally operated by a crew of two, a loader and a gunner. The launcher is loaded by attaching a rocket container to the rear of the launcher. When the container is attached, the electrical firing circuit is connected. The rocket container is 626 mm (24.6 in) long and weighs approximately 3.2 kg (7.1 lb). On the left side of the launcher is a 3× APX M 309 optical sight, which is graduated between 100 and 1,000 m (110 and 1,090 yd). The launcher has a shoulder rest and left hand forward grip, both of which may be adjusted to suit the firer. The right hand pistol grip contains a mechanical safety switch and the firing mechanism. When the safety is off, pulling the trigger generates a charge which fires the rocket.

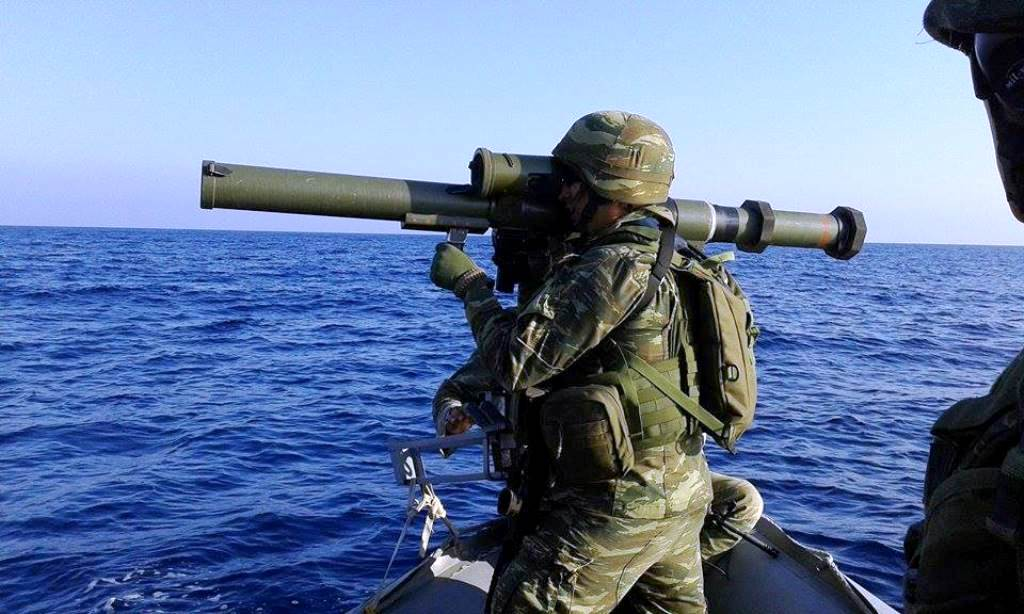
Greek special forces personnel aiming an LRAC F1 during an amphibious exercise

The watertight rear plug of the rocket container is removed just before firing, which closes the firing circuit and allows the rocket to be fired. The rocket is propelled by a large number of long sticks of tubular propellant that produce a constant pressure while burning, providing constant acceleration. The engine burns out before the rocket leaves the launcher at a velocity of approximately 300 m/s (980 ft/s). As soon as the rocket leaves the launcher, nine fins fold backwards from the rear. These fins provide stability for the rocket while it is in flight. There are two safeties. The first is a bore-riding pin located mid-body of the projectile that blocks the warhead firing circuit. After the projectile leaves the tube, the bore-riding pin falls out releasing the second safety which prevents detonation until the rocket has traveled at least 10 m (11 yd) from the launcher. The rocket reaches a range of 330 m (360 yd) in about 1.25 seconds, and 360 m (390 yd) in 1.36 seconds.

The rocket itself weighs 2.2 kg (4.9 lb) and has an 89 mm (3.5 in) diameter shaped charge warhead. The warhead can penetrate 400 mm (16 in) of armour or one metre of concrete at 0 angle impact of the armour plating, and is capable of penetrating NATO single heavy, double medium and double heavy targets while still having enough energy to penetrate multiple 10 mm (0.011 yd) thick steel witness plates.

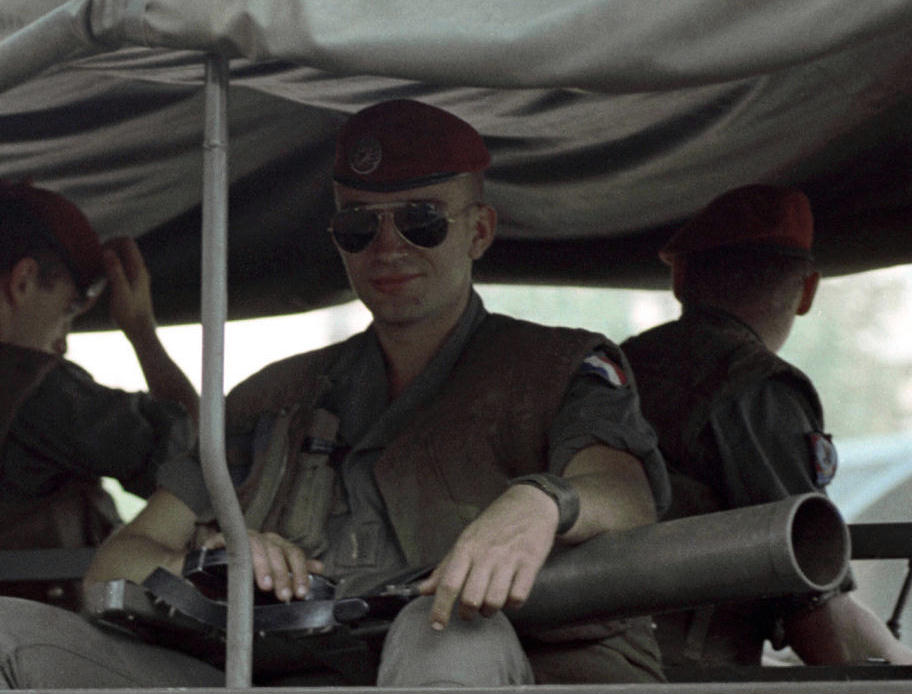
A French soldier holding a LRAC F1 in 1983.

After firing, the rocket container is removed, and a fresh one is inserted. The launcher has a life of approximately 130 firings, after which the optical sight is removed and the launcher is discarded. The optical sight can then be fitted to a fresh launcher.

A number of other rockets were developed for the launcher, including a dual purpose anti-personnel-anti-vehicle rocket with a warhead containing 1,600 steel balls along with a smaller HEAT antiarmour warhead. The steel balls have a lethal radius of approximately 20 m (22 yd) and the shaped charge is capable of penetrating up to 100 mm (3.9 in) of steel plating. A smoke round was developed, that produces smoke for approximately 35 seconds; and an illumination round that produces 300,000 candela for 30 seconds.

== Service Use ==
Besides the French Army and the Hellenic Army, numerous other armies have the LRAC F1 in service, especially former French colonies in Africa. During the French intervention in Lebanon in 1982-83, many journalists in error reported the LRAC F1 as being the MILAN wire guided antitank missile.

Since 2008, the Swedish AT4-CS (confined space) individual antitank weapon and the 600 m range Eryx wire-guided anti-tank missile have been replacing the LRAC F1 as the standard French military's short range and ultra-short range anti-tank and assault weapon. However, a few LRACs were used during Operation Serval in 2013.

== Users ==
- Benin
- Burkina Faso
- Cameroon
- Cape Verde
- Chad
- Central African Republic: 100 received in 1981-1983
- Djibouti
- Gabon
- Greece
- Indonesia
- Ivory Coast
- France
- Kurdistan
- Madagascar
- Morocco
- Niger
- Nigeria
- Senegal
- Togo
- Tunisia
- Zaire

== Bibliography ==
- Suermondt, Jan (2004). Illustrated Guide to Combat Weapons. Kent: Grange Books. p. 10.
- Hogg, Ian (1991). Jane's Infantry Weapons 1991–1992. Jane's Information Group. pp. 370–372.
