= AMX-10 RC =

French armoured reconnaissance vehicle

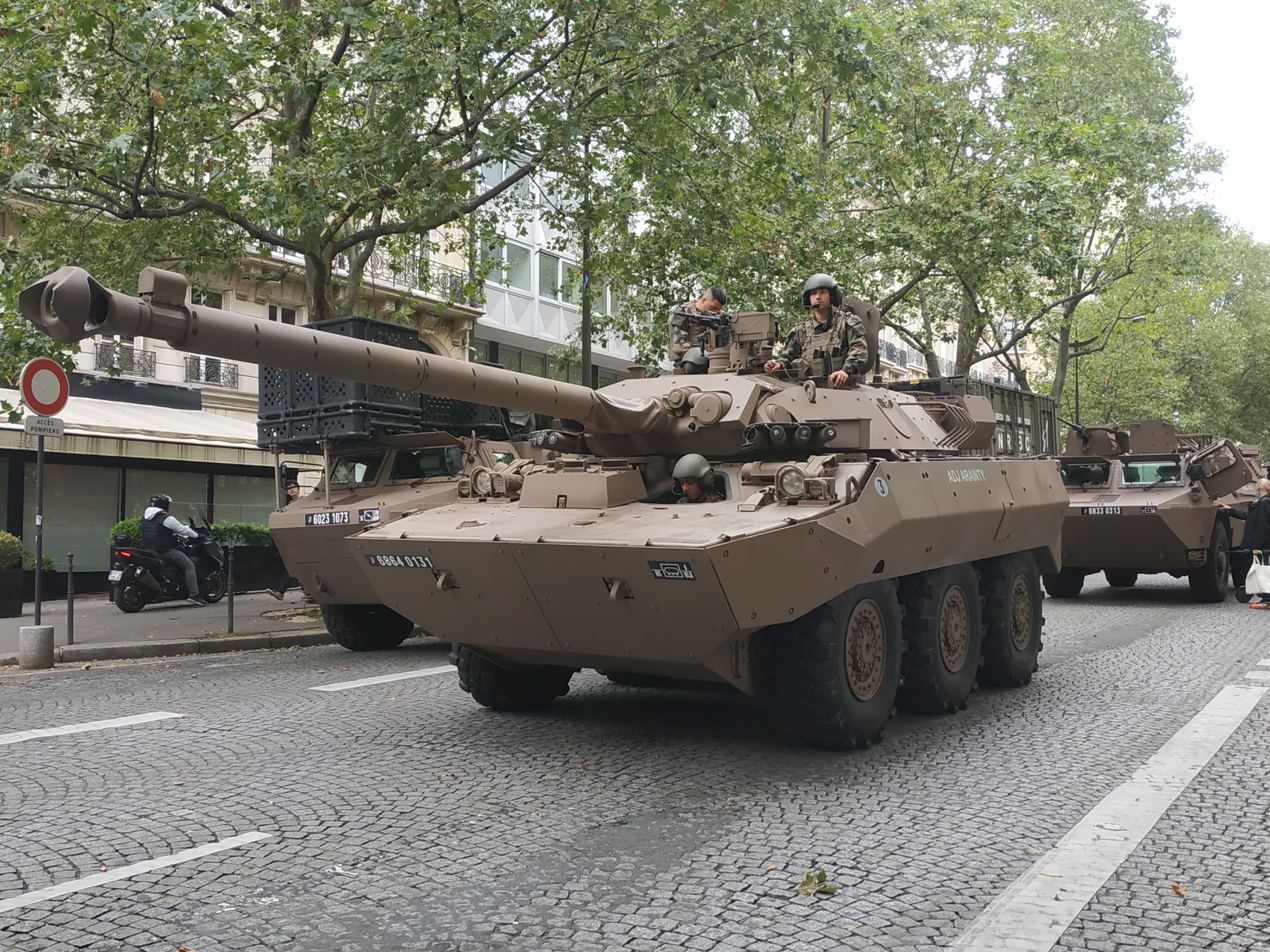
- A French Army AMX 10 RCR after the 2021 Bastille Day Parade
- Type: Armoured reconnaissance vehicle; Fire support vehicle
- Place of origin: France

Service history
- In service: 1981–present
- Wars: Western Sahara War; Gulf War; Kosovo War; War in Afghanistan; Mali War; Operation Serval; Russian invasion of Ukraine

Production history
- Designed: 1970
- No. built: 464

Specifications
- Mass: 15.8 tonnes (17.4 short tons; 15.6 long tons); 16.6 tonnes (18.3 short tons; 16.3 long tons) with add-on armor; 17.2 tonnes (19.0 short tons; 16.9 long tons) AMX-10 RCR; 22 tonnes (24 short tons; 22 long tons) with the SEPAR mine/IED protection kit
- Length: 9.15 m (30 ft 0 in) (gun forward); 6.24 m (20 ft 6 in) (hull only)
- Width: 2.78 m (9 ft 1 in)
- Height: 2.56 m (8 ft 5 in)
- Crew: 4
- Armor: Frontal armour resistant against 23 mm API from 300 m; 14.5 mm AP all-around with add-on armor
- Main armament: 105 mm F2 BK MECA L/47 medium-pressure gun (38 rounds)
- Secondary armament: 1 × 7.62 mm NF1 coaxial machine gun (4,000 cartridges); 1 × 12.7 mm M2HB AA machine gun (optional); 4 × GALIX smoke dischargers
- Engine: Hispano-Suiza HS-115 multifuel (1981–1985); Baudouin Diesel Model 6F11 SRX (current); HS-115: 186 kW (249 hp) at 3,200 rpm; 6F11: 209 kW (280 hp) at 3,000 rpm
- Power/weight: from 11.8 kW/tonne
- Suspension: variable hydropneumatic
- Operational range: 800 km (500 mi) on road
- Maximum speed: 85 km/h (53 mph) on road; 40 km/h (25 mph) off-road

The AMX-10 RC is a French armoured fighting vehicle manufactured by Nexter Systems for armoured reconnaissance purposes. Equipping French cavalry units since 1979, over 240 remained in service with the French Army in 2021 when replacement by EBRC Jaguar gradually started. 108 units were sold to Morocco and 12 to Qatar. "RC" stands for "Roues-Canon", meaning "wheels-gun", as it is 6-wheeled and armed with a 105 mm calibre gun. Newspapers and officials have often incorrectly referred to it as a "char léger" (light tank).

The AMX-10 RC is distinct from the amphibious AMX-10P: they both have a waterproof welded aluminum chassis and share automotive components, but have completely different battlefield roles. The AMX-10 RC is usually used for reconnaissance missions in dangerous environments or for fire support.

== Design and development ==
A diagram of the AMX-10 RC

Initial work on the AMX-10 RC began in 1970, derived of the AMX-10P. Prototypes testing began in 1976. The first production vehicle was delivered in 1979 to the 2nd Regiment de Hussards in Sourdun. The vehicle features a powerful GIAT 105 mm gun mounted in a welded aluminum turret. The TK 105 turret houses three crew members, while the driver sits in the front of the hull. A COTAC fire control system is provided for gun aiming. It has a six wheel drive. The AMX-10 RC uses skid steering to turn the hull.

=== Engine ===
The AMX-10 RC initially used the Hispano-Suiza HS 115-2, multi-fuel, liquid-cooled, supercharged V8 engine with 190 kW (250 hp) at 3,200 rpm.

In 1985, the Baudouin 6F11 SRX supercharged diesel engine was selected to equip the last production AMX-10 RC vehicles as a production cut-in, as well as for eventual retrofit to all AMX-10 RC vehicles of the French Army. This engine has 220 kW (300 hp), but governed at 190 kW (250 hp) at 3,000 rpm in the French army.

A 24 volt electrical system with six 12-volt/100-ampere-hour batteries is standard. Two waterjets are used for water propulsion, mounted on each side of the hull at the rear.

=== Transmission ===
The AMX-10 RC vehicles use an unspecified preselector gearbox with four forward and four reverse gear ratios. The clutch is electro-magnetically operated and the gearbox is fitted with a torque converter. A power take-off unit operates the two waterjets. The AMX-10 RC is skid steered and can perform a pivot turn.

=== Suspension and running gear ===
The 6x6 AMX-10 RC is fitted with a hydropneumatic suspension system with variable ground clearance and tilt, provided by Messier Auto-Industry. A centralized lubrication and tire inflation system is fitted. A shock damper is mounted at each wheel station.

=== Armament ===
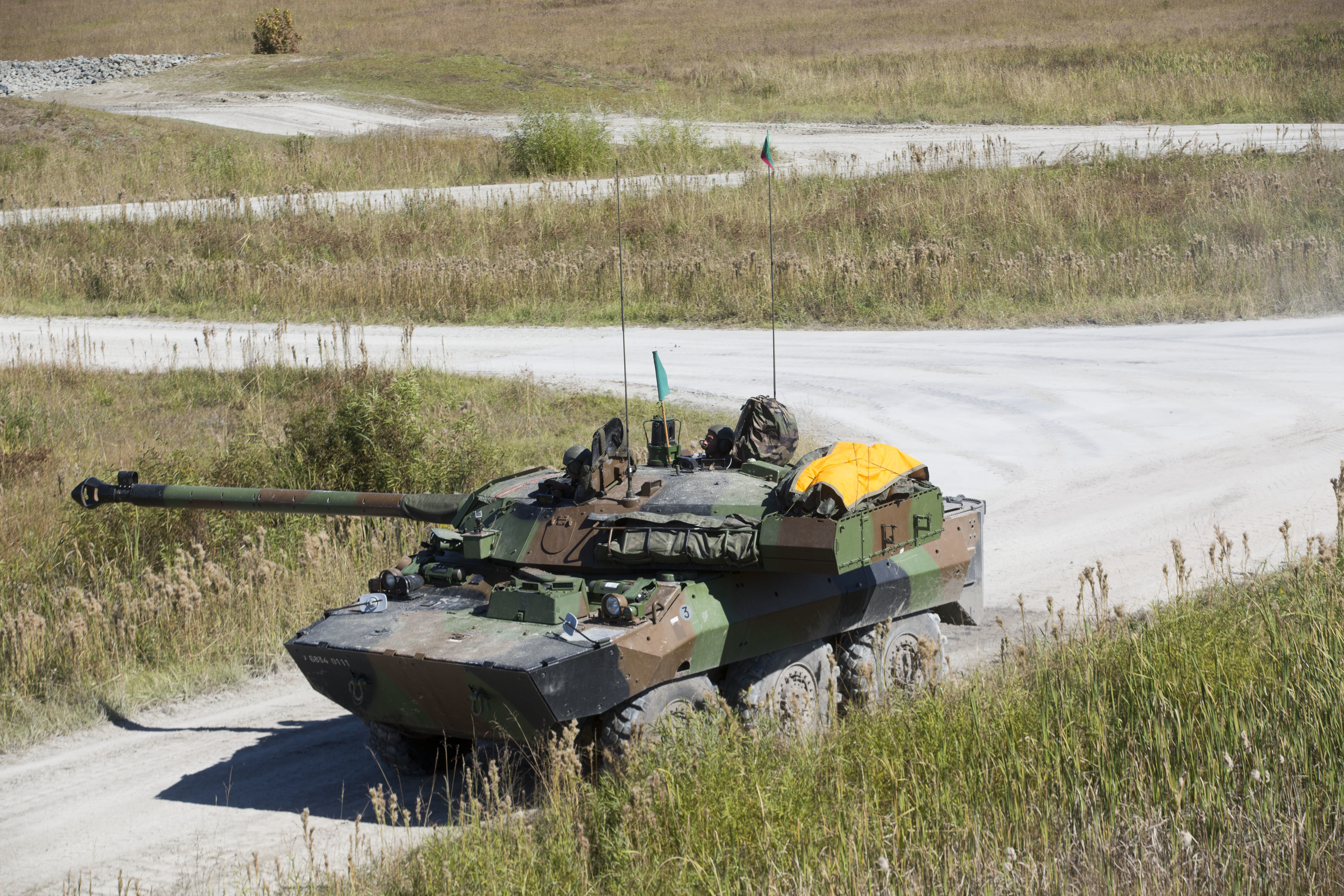
A French Army AMX-10 RC, 2017

The AMX-10 RC is fitted with a 105/47 F2 MECA 105 mm medium-pressure gun, mounted in a GIAT Industries TK 105 three-man turret. The F2 cannon fires 105×527R proprietary ammunition. The turret uses a SAMM CH49 electrohydraulic gun control system. No stabilization system is fitted.

An ANF1 7.62 mm machine gun is mounted coaxially to the main armament. Two electrically operated smoke grenade launchers are mounted on each side of the turret. 38 main-gun rounds, 4,000 rounds of 7.62 mm ammunition, and 16 smoke grenades are carried.

French 105 mm 105×527R ammunition
Ammunition type	Designation	Round weight (kg)	Projectile weight (kg)	Muzzle velocity (m/s)	Penetration (mm)
HEAT-FS	OCC 105 F3	13,85 kg	5,7 kg	1120 m/s	>350 mm (at 0° incidence); 150 mm (at 60° incidence)
High-Explosive	OE 105 F3	13,7 kg	7,2 kg	800 m/s	—
Target Practice / Dummy	BSCC 105 F3	13,85 kg	5,7 kg	1120 m/s	—
APFSDS	OFL 105 F3	13 kg	3,8 kg	1400 m/s	NATO Single Heavy Target at 1200 m (150 mm at 60° incidence); NATO Triple Heavy Target at 2200 m

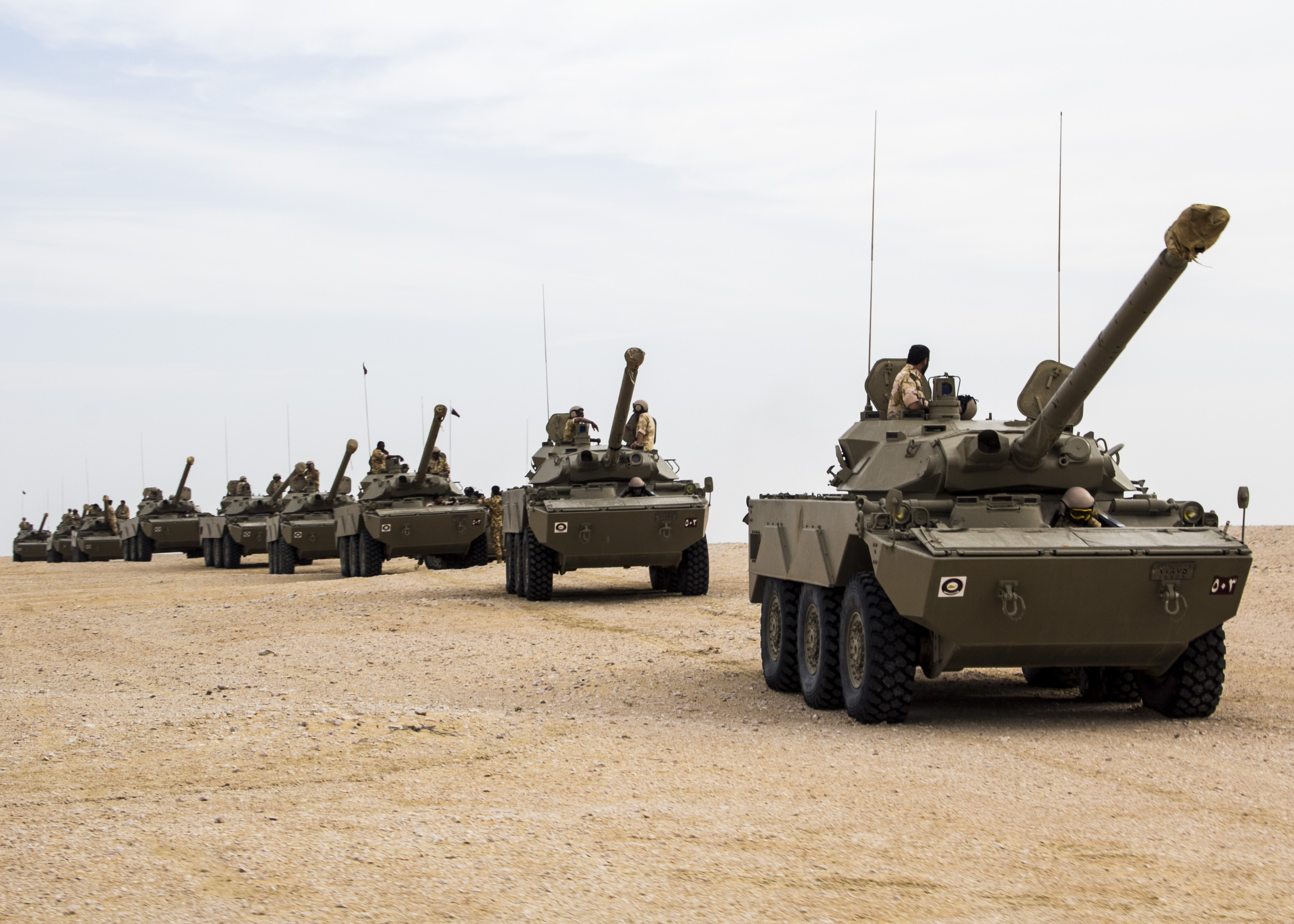
Qatari AMX-10 RCs in the desert during multinational combined-arms exercises, 2013

The F2 105 mm medium-pressure rifled gun fires four types of 105×527R ammunition: OFL 105 F3 APFSDS, OE 105 F3 HE, OCC 105 F3 HEAT-FS and the BSCC 105 F3 target practice round. The APFSDS, which uses the penetrator from the GIAT OFL 90 F1 mm APFSDS round, is capable of defeating a NATO single heavy tank target at a range of 1,200 metres and the NATO triple heavy tank target at a range of 2,200 metres.

The AMX-10 RC has been upgraded many times. The DIVT-13 LLTV was replaced by using DIVT-16, 18 and 19 CASTOR thermal sights taken from decommissioned AMX-30B2 MBTs. For the 1991 Gulf War, the AMX-10 RC was provided with extra-high-hardness steel add-on armour and an EIREL infrared jammer. The original muzzle brake was replaced by a more efficient one, with a 10% recoil reduction, after the introduction of the OFL 105 F3 APFSDS in 1987. The flotation barrier and the water pump jets were removed, with their intakes sealed.

The AMX-10 RCR introduced a FINDERS C2R battlefield management system. One improvement considered, but not implemented, was the installation of the TML 105 modular light turret, armed with a more powerful 105 mm G2 high-pressure gun, as the F2 gun was not compatible with NATO munitions. A central tire inflation system is available for added traction over soft terrain. The AMX-10 RC is equipped with an NBC (Nuclear/Biological/Chemical) protection system and may conduct reconnaissance in radioactive environments.

== AMX-10 RCR modernisation ==
In 2010, Nexter completed the modernisation of 256 AMX-10 RC vehicles to the RCR (Rénové; renovated) configuration. This programme integrated various systems and additional armour, active self-protection by SAGEM, LIRE (Leurre InfRarougE, infrared flare), the SIT (Système d'Information Terminal) V1 battlefield management system, Galix smoke grenade launchers, changes in the NBC protection and improvements in the suspension. Speed gearboxes and tactical communications were completed with Thales Communications & Security PR4G VS4. The integration was done by DCMAT (Direction Centrale du Matériel de l'Armée de Terre, Land Army Central Matèriel Directorate).

== Variants ==
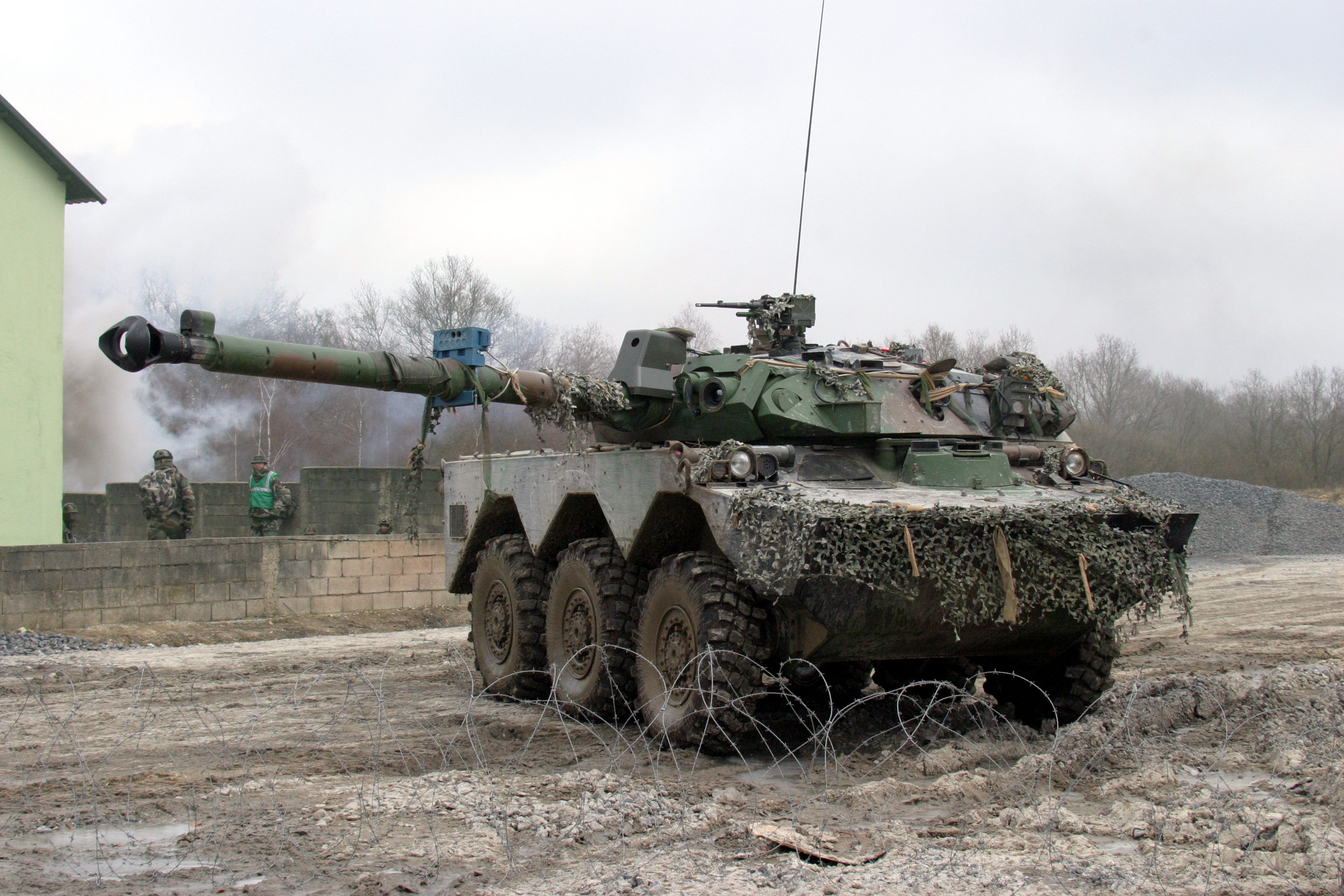
An AMX-10 RC in 2006, with Central European camouflage introduced in 1991

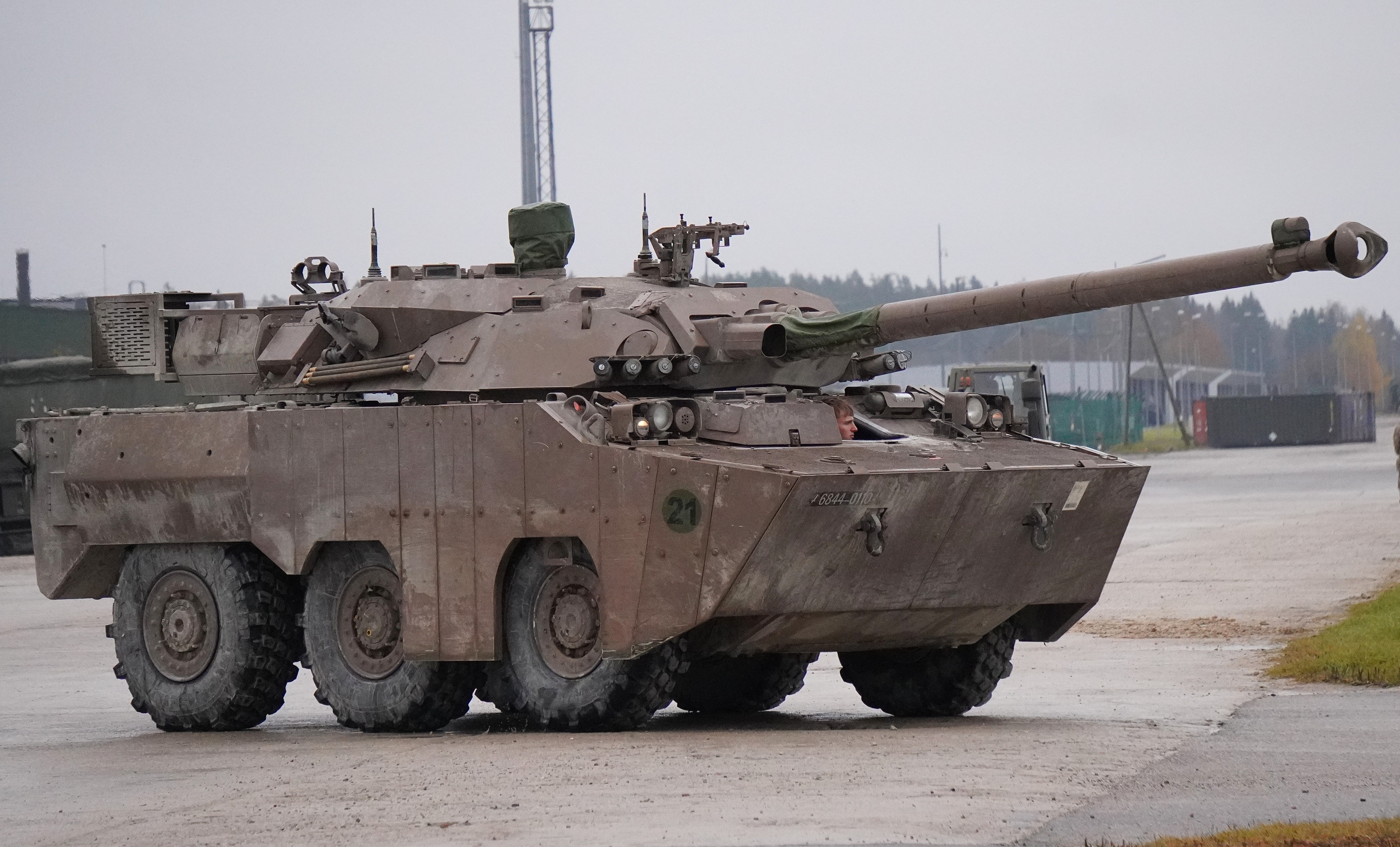
An AMX-10 RCR SEPAR, featuring additional side armor and underlying armor for IEDs.

- AMX-10 RC: initial production model with amphibious capability.
- AMX-10 RC surblindé (uparmored): fitted with add-on armor and without amphibious capability.
- AMX-10 RCR revalorisé (upgraded)

== Prototypes ==
- AMX-10 RTT: APC version.
- AMX-10 RAC: fitted with the TS 90 turret armed with a 90 mm gun.
- AMX-10 RAA: AAA version first presented at Eurosatory in 1981. It featured a large turret armed with two 30 mm autocannons.
- AMX-10 RC with TML 105: AMX-10 RC fitted with the Tourelle Modulaire Légère (Light Modular Turret) featuring a stabilized G2 high-pressure 105 mm gun, GALIX launchers and new sights. A two-man configuration with a bustle-mounted autoloader was available as an option.

== Operational history ==
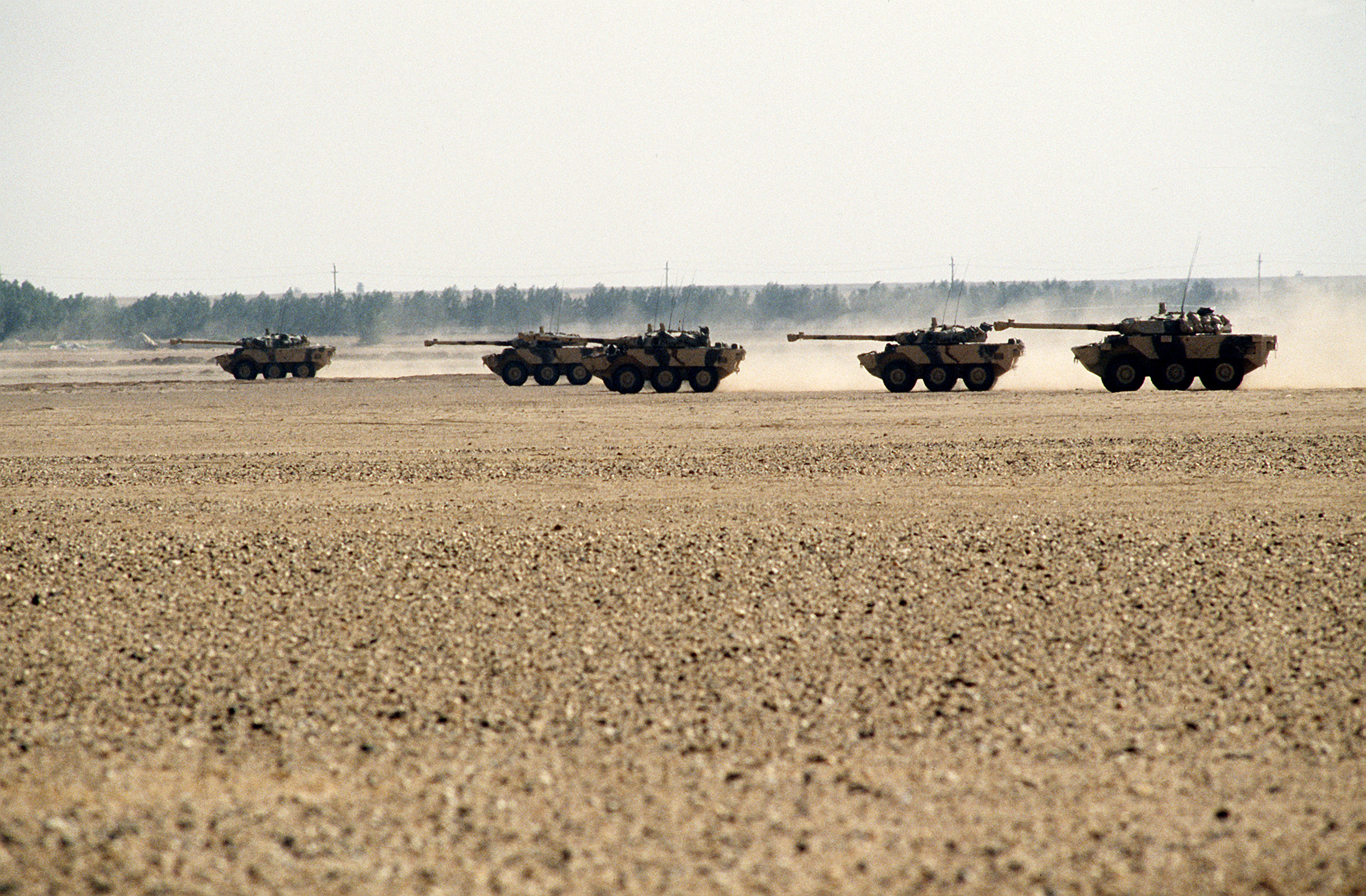
French AMX-10 RC reconnaissance vehicles move across the desert as part of a display of Allied armour during Operation Desert Shield

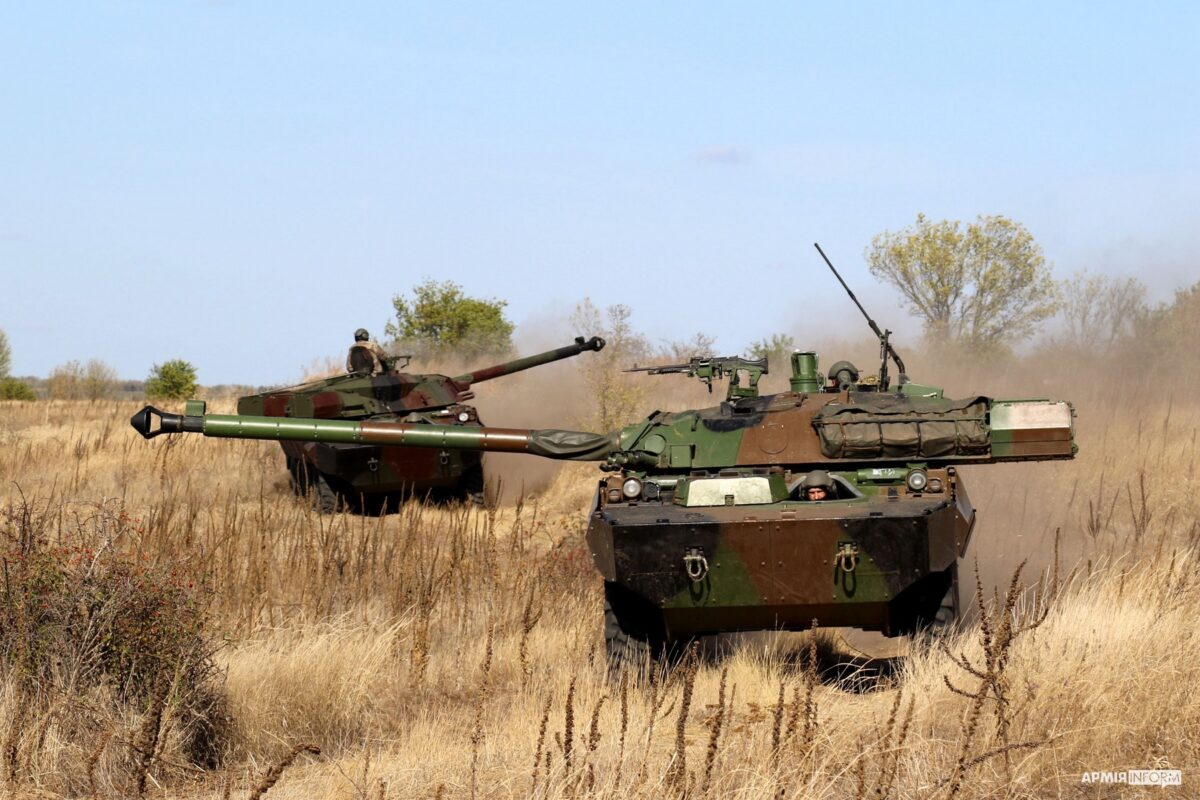
AMX-10 RC of the Ukrainian 37th Marine Brigade, October 2023

=== France ===
The French army's AMX-10 RC has been deployed to many theaters of operation since it was introduced, including the First Gulf War, the War in Afghanistan, in Mali, Kosovo, and Ivory Coast.

=== Ukraine ===
==== Russian Invasion of Ukraine ====
During the Russo-Ukrainian War, the AMX-10 RC saw action in the 2023 Ukrainian counteroffensive in Zaporozhia. First promised in January 2023, they entered Ukrainian service four months later with the 37th Marine Brigade. Ukrainian crews underwent a month of training in France to learn how to operate the vehicle. On 2 July 2023, amid the Ukrainian counteroffensive, it was reported that although they are good for fire support, the lack of a stabiliser for the main gun and their light armour made them unsuitable for frontal assaults. In one instance, fragments from 152mm artillery shells exploding nearby were able to pierce the armour, causing the stored ammunition to explode, destroying the vehicle and killing the crew of four.

French military experts had warned that the AMX-10 RC was useful in providing fire support and for exploiting gaps in the frontline, but that it was not designed to cope with modern anti-tank weaponry or to be used as a substitute for main battle tanks. The vehicle can also have problems with its gearbox if used for prolonged periods on hard roads. One AMX-10 RC was captured by forces of the Russian Federation and displayed in a military exhibit in Moscow on 15 August 2023. At least one captured AMX-10 was also delivered to North Korea (amongst other captured western sourced equipment) and displayed in the Memorial Museum of Combat Feats at the Overseas Military Operations in Pyongyang, as seen during a televised visit by Supreme Leader Kim Jong Un. It is unknown if these were given as a symbol of gratitude for North Korean assistance in the war or were captured by North Korean Forces.

According to Oryx, as of 1 May 2025, 6 of the 38 AMX-10 RCR in Ukrainian service were confirmed lost: three destroyed, two abandoned and one captured by Russian forces.

== Operators ==
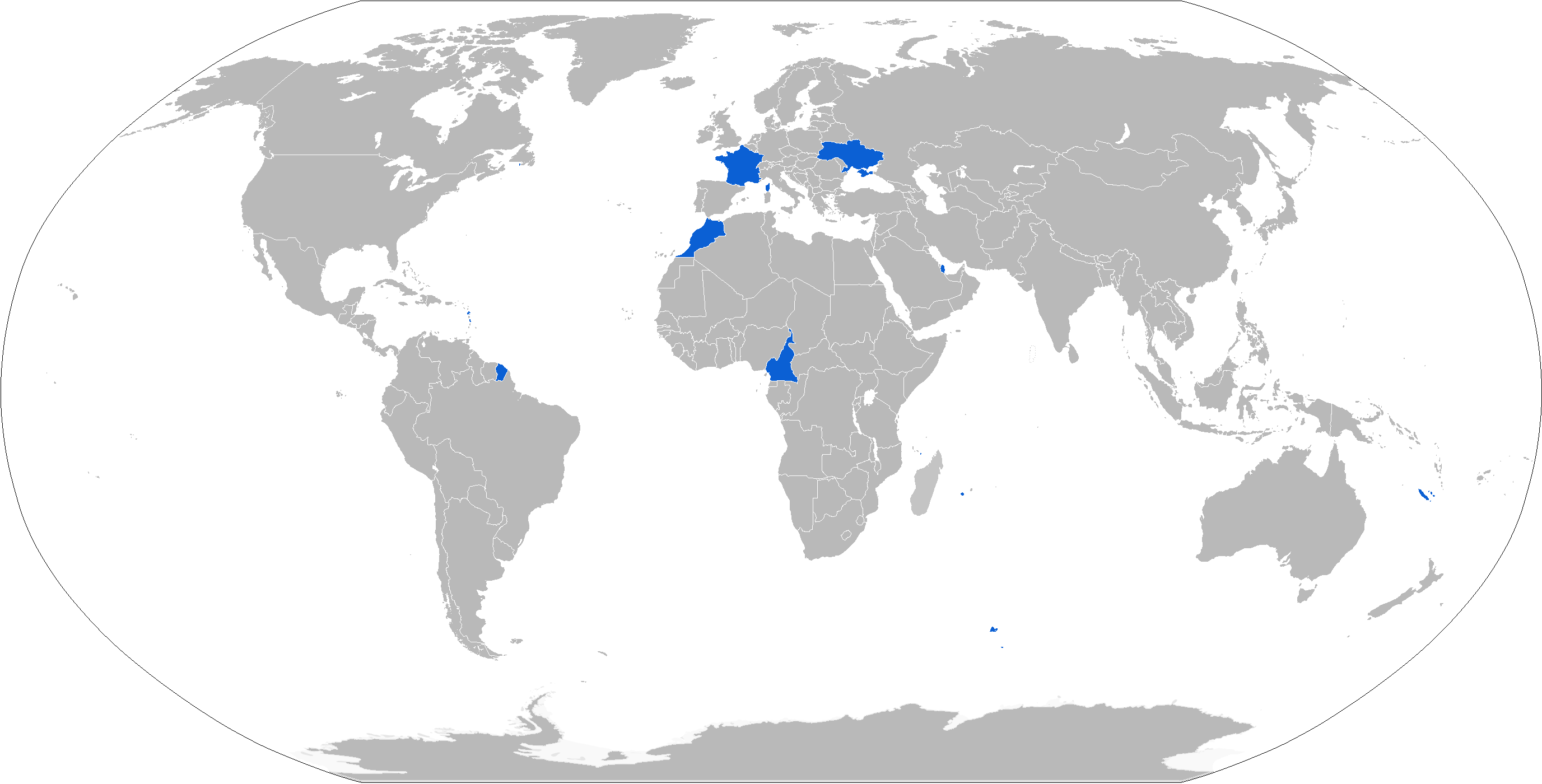
AMX 10 RC operators in blue

- Cameroon: 6.
- France: 248 in service in December 2021.
- Morocco: 198.
- Qatar: 12.
- Ukraine: 38

== Missions ==
- Armoured reconnaissance
- Armoured support
- Flanking security
