= Memorial Museum of Combat Feats at the Overseas Military Operations =

Museum and cemetery in Pyongyang, North Korea

- 해외군사작전 전투위훈기념관
- Established: 2026
- Location: Pyongyang
- Coordinates: 39.0679554°N 125.802708°E
- Visitors: Over 232,000 (May 2026)

Memorial Museum of Combat Feats at the Overseas Military Operations (Korean: 해외군사작전 전투위훈기념관) is a museum and a military cemetery in Pyongyang, North Korea. The museum serves as a war memorial commemorating North Korea's intervention in the Russo-Ukrainian war, particularly North Korean soldiers who fought during the Kursk campaign.

== Overview ==
Construction of the complex began in October 2025. The complex was opened on 26 April 2026, the official anniversary of the conclusion of the Kursk campaign. Dignitaries attending the opening ceremony included North Korean leader Kim Jong Un, North Korean politicians Jo Yong-won, Jo Chun-ryong, Minister of Defence No Kwang-chol, and Russian officials including Minister of Defence Andrey Belousov and the Chairman of the State Duma Vyacheslav Volodin. Kim, during the opening ceremony, praised North Korean soldiers who "self-blasted" themselves with grenades to avoid being captured by Ukrainian forces.

The complex includes approximately 280 individual graves for North Korean soldiers killed in the Kursk campaign, dioramas, and artifacts from the conflict. Photos released by the Korean Central News Agency reveal that captured Ukrainian military equipment is also displayed at the museum, including an AMX-10 RC armoured fighting vehicle, a Leopard 2A4 and M1A1 Abrams tanks. North Korea also appears to have confirmed the deployment of a military unit to launch ballistic missiles in its attacks against Ukraine.

According to North Korean state media, the museum received over 232,000 visitors after ten days of opening.

== Vehicles on display ==
- AMX-10 RC - French wheeled armoured reconnaissance vehicle
- BMC Kirpi - Turkish mine-resistant ambush protected vehicle
- Husky TSV - British variant of the American International MXT-MV infantry mobility vehicle
- Leopard 2A4 - German main battle tank
- M113 armoured personnel carrier - American tracked armoured personnel carrier
- M1A1SA Abrams - American main battle tank
- Mastiff Protected Patrol Vehicle - British variant of the American Cougar mine-resistant ambush protected vehicle
- Marder 1 - German tracked infantry fighting vehicle
- Patria Pasi XA-185 - Finnish wheeled armoured personnel carrier
- Véhicule de l'Avant Blindé - French wheeled armoured personnel carrier
