= AMX-VCI =

AMX-13 VCI
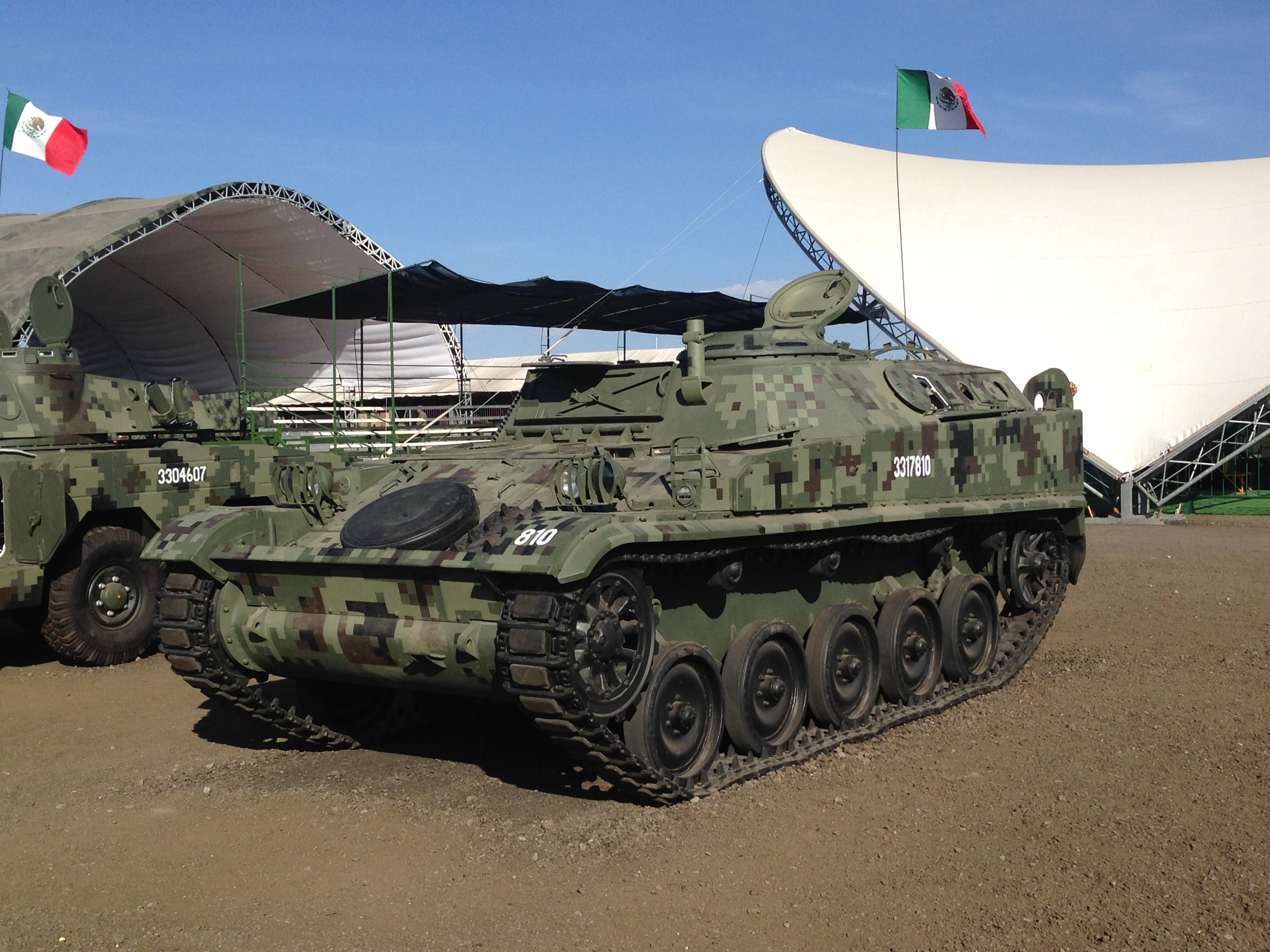
- Mexican AMX-VCI (DNC1)
- Type: Armored personnel carrier
- Place of origin: France

Service history
- Wars: Turkish invasion of Cyprus; Indonesian invasion of East Timor; Lebanese Civil War; South Lebanon conflict (1985–2000); Cenepa War; Mexican drug war South Sudanese Civil War

Specifications
- Mass: 15.0 tonnes
- Length: 5.7 m
- Width: 2.67 m
- Height: 2.41m
- Crew: 3 + 10 passengers
- Armor: 10-40mm
- Main armament: turret mounted 20mm F2/M693 autocannon
- Secondary armament: 12.7 mm M2 Browning machine gun or 7.62 mm MAS
- Engine: SOFAM Model 8Gxb 8-cyl. water-cooled petrol 190 kW (250 hp)
- Power/weight: 16.7/tonne
- Suspension: Torsion-bar
- Operational range: 350 km
- Maximum speed: 60 km/h

The AMX-VCI (French: Véhicule de Combat d'Infanterie) is one of the many variants of the French AMX-13 light tank. It was the front line APC of the French Army until replaced by the AMX-10P. It is still used by some countries, for example Mexico, where it goes under the name of DNC-1 and is armed with a 20mm cannon.

== History ==
Beginning in 1957, some 3,000 vehicles were produced. It was initially produced as the AMX-13 VTT (véhicule de transport de troupe), which carried ten infantrymen and was armed with either an AA-52 7.62 mm machine gun or a 12.7 mm M2 Browning machine gun in an open mounting. The final versions had a turret equipped with a 20mm light autocannon, producing a vehicle that can be seen as an early example of the infantry fighting vehicle.

== Variants ==
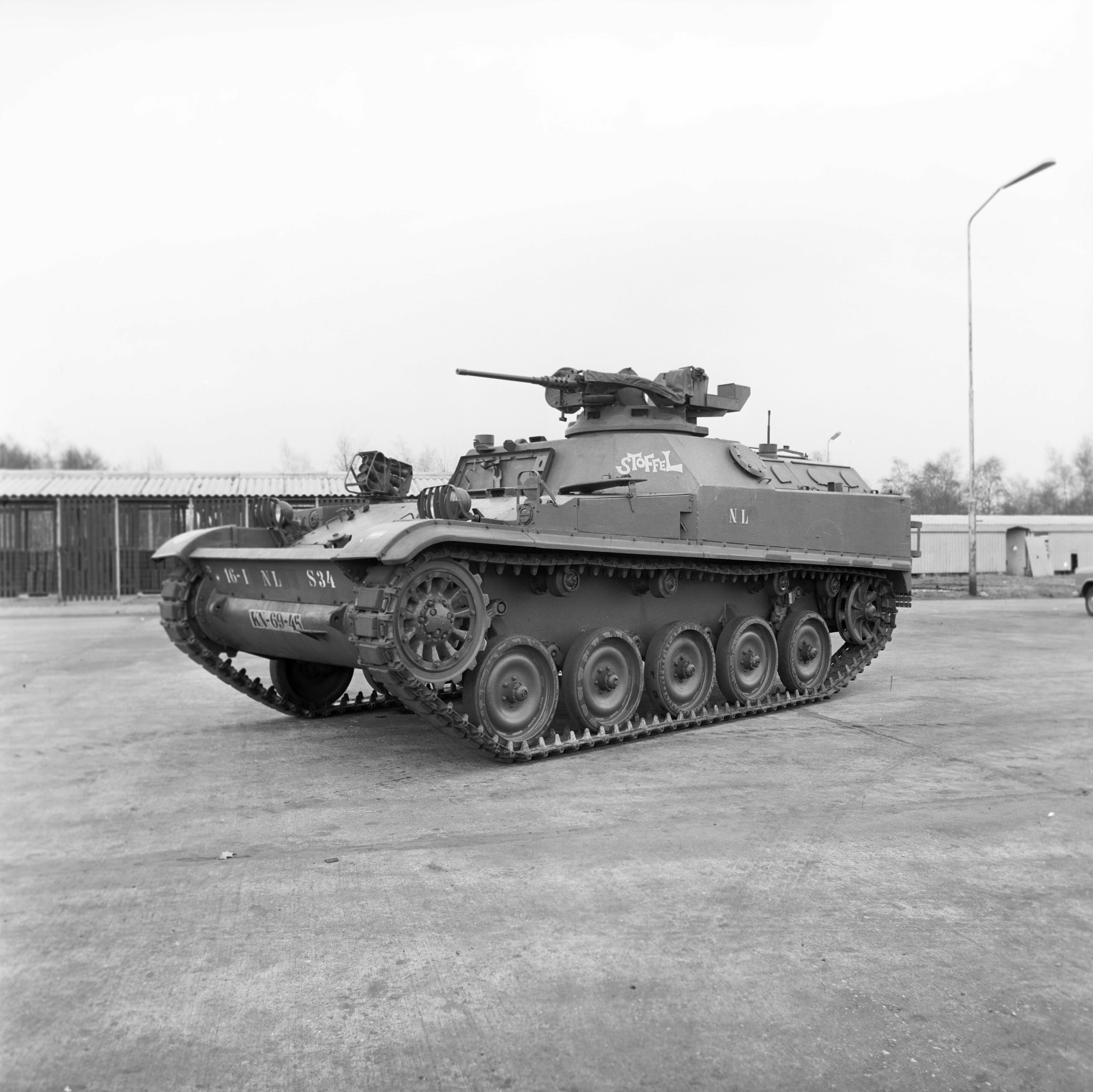
Dutch AMX-PRI armoured personnel carrier armed with the Browning M2HB heavy machine gun.

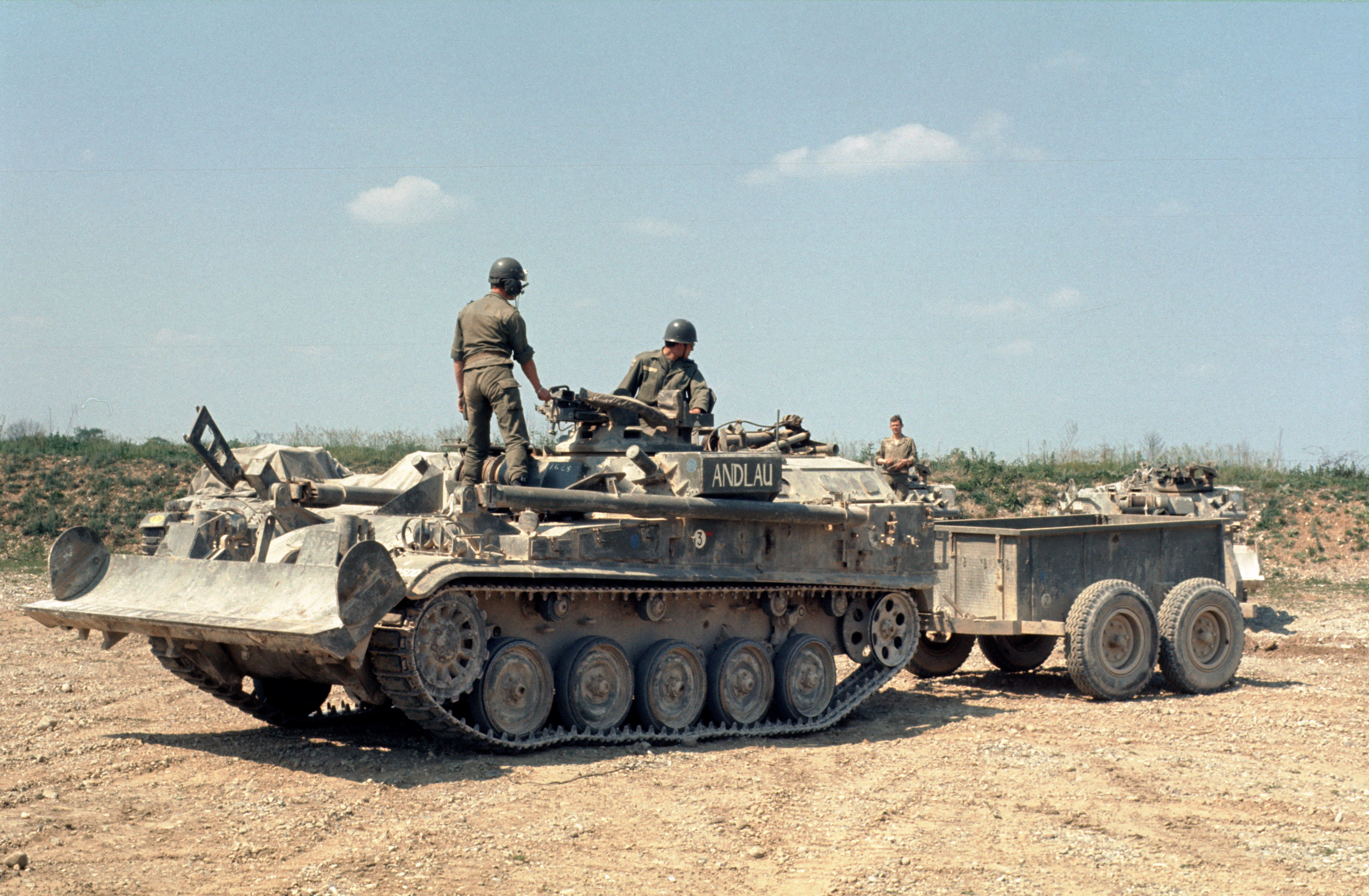
AMX-VCG engineering vehicle in French service.

The AMX-13 VCI itself was the basis for a number of variants:

- AMX-VTP: Original APC variant armed with an open-mount light machine-gun
- AMX-VTT (AMX-VCI): APC fitted with a turret mounted light machine-gun
- AMX-LT: VTT based artillery fire control vehicle
- AMX-PC: VTT based Command Post
- AMX-VCA: VTT based 155 mm Support Vehicle designed to accompany the Mk F3 SPH
- AMX-VCG: Combat engineer version
- AMX-VCI 12.7: Version with a 50 calibre (12.7 mm) HMG used by France and the Netherlands
- AMX-VCI M-56: Fitted with a 20mm cannon
- AMX-VCPM de 81: VTT-based 81 mm Mortar Carrier
- AMX-VCPM de 120: VTT-based 120 mm Mortar Carrier
- AMX-VCTB (Vehicule Chenillé Transport Blessés): VTT-based Ambulance
- AMX-VTT avec tourelle NA2: Fitted with ATGM launcher
- AMX-VTT ROLAND: Roland SPAAML
- AMX-VTT Version 1987: Modernised version with all the tank automotive improvements
- AMX-VTT with Minotaur Mine System: Minotaur scatterable mine-laying system fitted on the rear
- AMX-13 RATAC: VTT-based RATAC ground surveillance radar vehicle
- AMX DOZER: bulldozer blade equipped version
- AMX-13 VCPC: Argentinian Army version of the AMX-13 VCI
- AMX-13 mod.56 VCI: Belgian Army version with a .30 Browning mounted in a CALF38 turret
- AMX-13 mod.56 [81 mm mortar carrier]: Belgian Army version
- AMX-13 mod.56 [command post]: Belgian Army version
- AMX-13 mod.56 [ENTAC atgm]: Belgian Army version with a rear-mounted ENTAC missile launcher
- AMX-13 mod.56 [cargo]: Belgian Army version
- AMX-VTT TOW: Dutch Army version with a TOW launcher on a cupola
- AMX-GWT (GeWonden Transport): Dutch army version of the VCTB
- AMX-VCI Retrofit: Indonesian Army modernization with the hull lengthened 20 cm to accommodate Navistar 400hp engine, redesigned engine deck, frontal armor, and exhaust, also modification to transmission and suspension.
- DNC-1: Mexican Army local designation, slightly modernized version with a diesel engine and a 20 mm. cannon, upgraded by SEDENA

== Combat history ==
=== Lebanon ===
A total of 60 AMX-VCIs were delivered to the Lebanese Army in 1971-72, with additional 30 vehicles being reportedly delivered in May 1983. A number of VCIs were seized by the Amal Movement militia and the pro-Israeli South Lebanon Army (SLA) militia in February 1984 after the defeat of the Lebanese government forces by Shia Muslim and Druze militias during the Mountain War. The captured vehicles were quickly pressed into service by the SLA, who used them during the South Lebanon conflict (1985–2000) until the collapse of the militia in the wake of the Israeli withdrawal of April 2000; those used by Amal were returned to the Lebanese Army earlier in October 1990. VCIs up-armed with US M40 106mm recoilless rifles were also employed by Lebanese Army General Michel Aoun's loyalist troops during the Elimination War waged against his Christian rivals of the Lebanese Forces (LF) militia at East Beirut in February 1990, who in turn also managed to capture some VCIs from Army barracks, which were returned in 1991-94.

== Operators ==
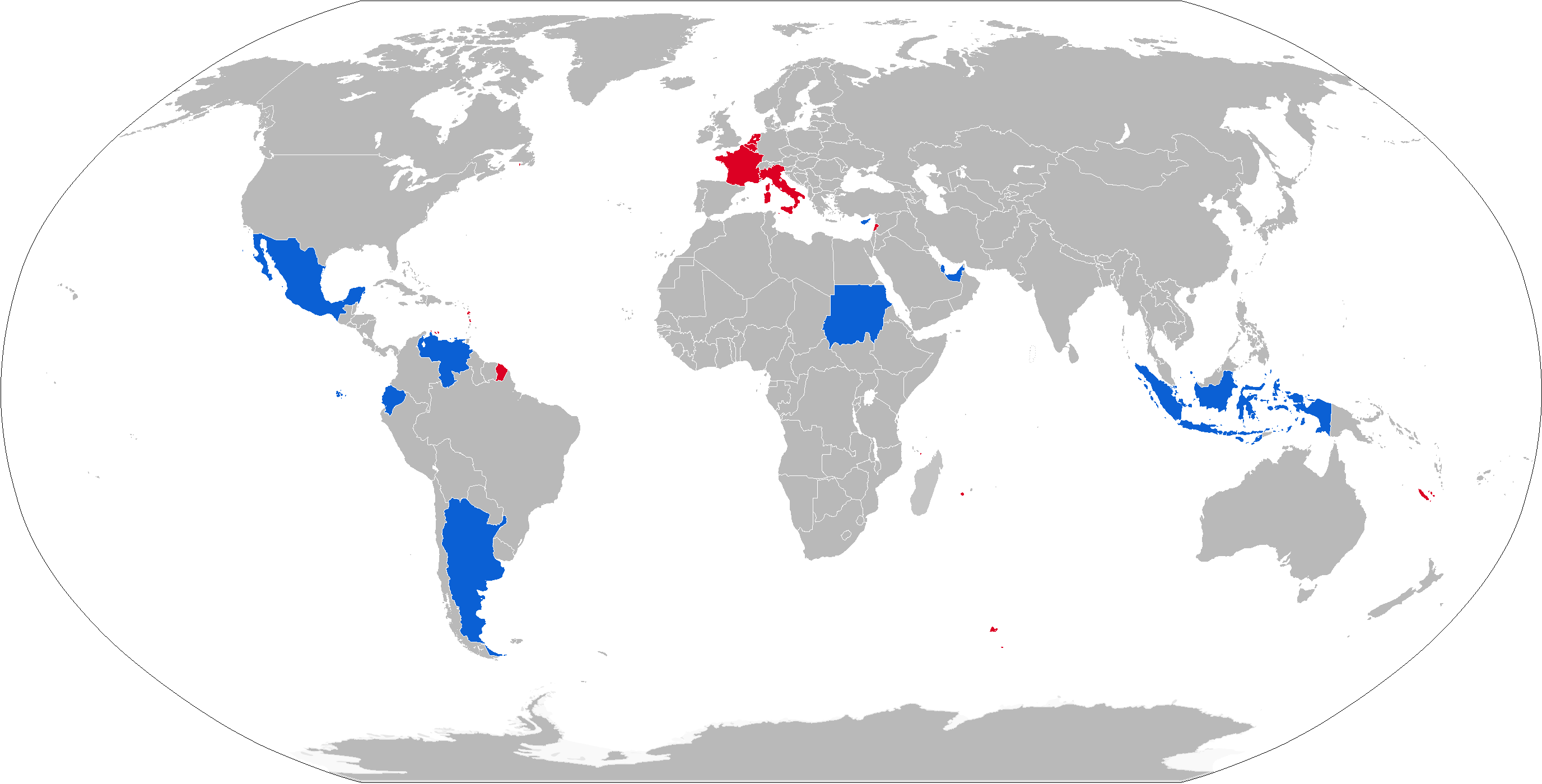
Map with AMX-VCI operators in blue and former operators in red

=== Current operators ===
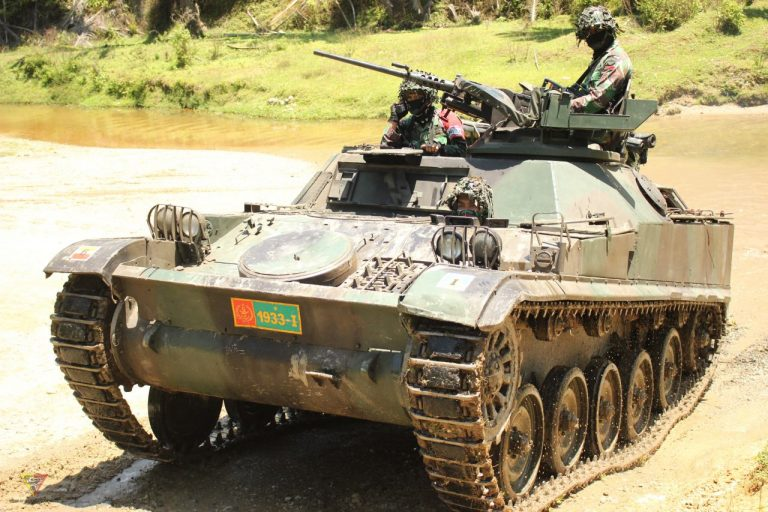
Indonesian AMX-VCI with M2 Browning

- Cyprus: VTT/VCA and command post versions in service with the Cypriot National Guard.
- Ecuador: Ecuadorian Army
- Indonesia: Indonesian Army 200 acquired in the 1960s. As of 2016, only 75 vehicles remain in service.
- Mexico: Mexican Army 409 in service.
- Qatar: Qatar Armed Forces (Army)
- Sudan: Sudan People's Armed Forces
- Venezuela: Venezuelan Army and Venezuelan National Guard (AMX-VCTB Modernized)
- United Arab Emirates: United Arab Emirates Army

=== Former operators ===
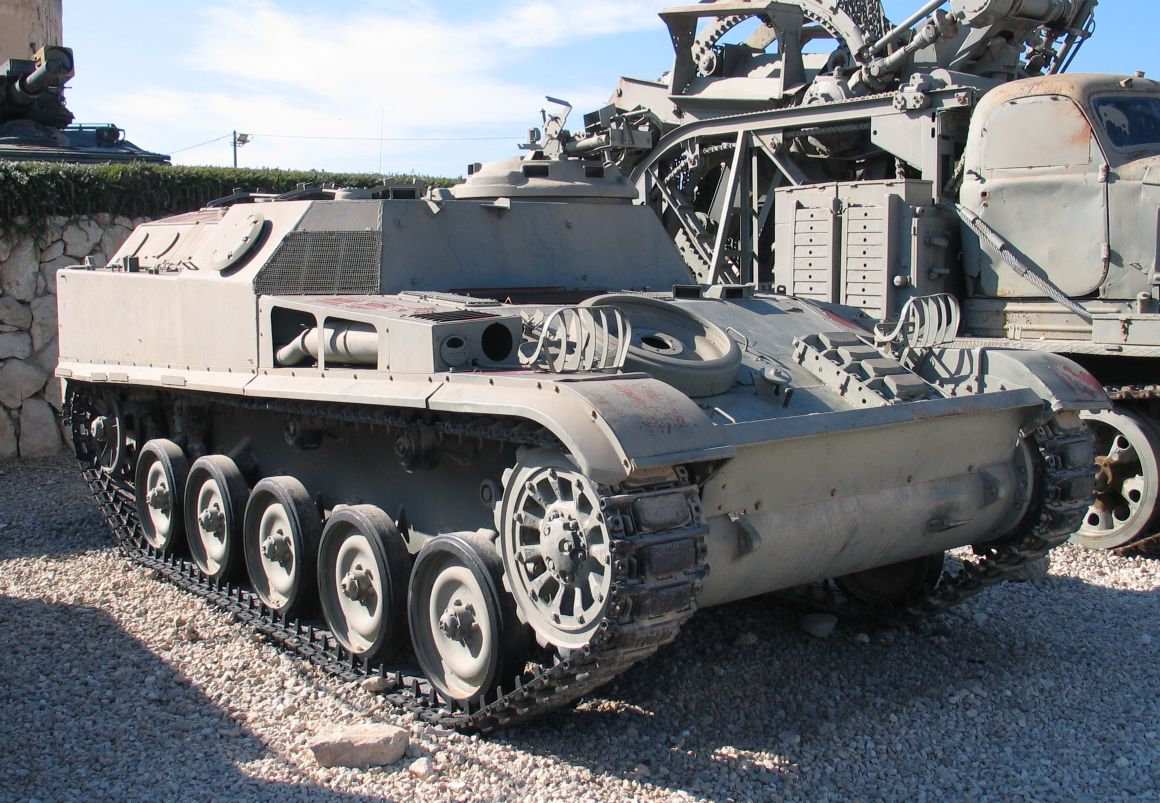
Ex-Lebanese Army AMX-VCI in Yad La-Shiryon Museum, Latrun, Israel, 2005.

- Belgium: Belgian Army, successor to the M75 armored personnel carrier. AMX-13 mod.56 VTT (305 vehicles), AMX-13 mod.56 PC (72 vehicles), AMX-13 mod.56 Cargo (58 vehicles), AMX-13 mod.56 Mor (90 vehicles), AMX-13 mod.56 MILAN (86 vehicles) and AMX-13 mod.56 ENTAC (30 vehicles). Replaced by the M113A1-B and the AIFV-B.
- France: French Army, replaced by the AMX-10P.
- Italy: Italian Army, AMX-13 VCI (various versions) (80-100 vehicles).
- Lebanon: 90 vehicles in service with the Lebanese Army from surplus French Army stocks between 1971 and 1993. Replaced by the M113 and the AIFV-B-C25.
- Netherlands: Dutch Army, 345 AMX-PRI (infantry fighting vehicle), 162 PRCO (command), 46 PRVR (cargo) et 46 PRGWT (ambulance). 67 PRI modified to mortar carriers (PRMR) et 26 to tank destroyers (PRAT), with TOW missiles
- Amal Movement militia: ex-Lebanese Army vehicles in service between 1984 and 1990.
- Lebanese Forces: ex-Lebanese Army vehicles in service between 1990 and 1994.
- South Lebanon Army: ex-Lebanese Army vehicles in service between 1984 and 2000.

=== Evaluation-only operators ===
- Israel: Israel Defense Forces, captured 2 abandoned Lebanese Army VCIs during the 1982 Lebanon War.

== See also ==
- AMX-13
- AMX-10P
- List of AFVs
- List of weapons of the Lebanese Civil War
