= AMX-10P =

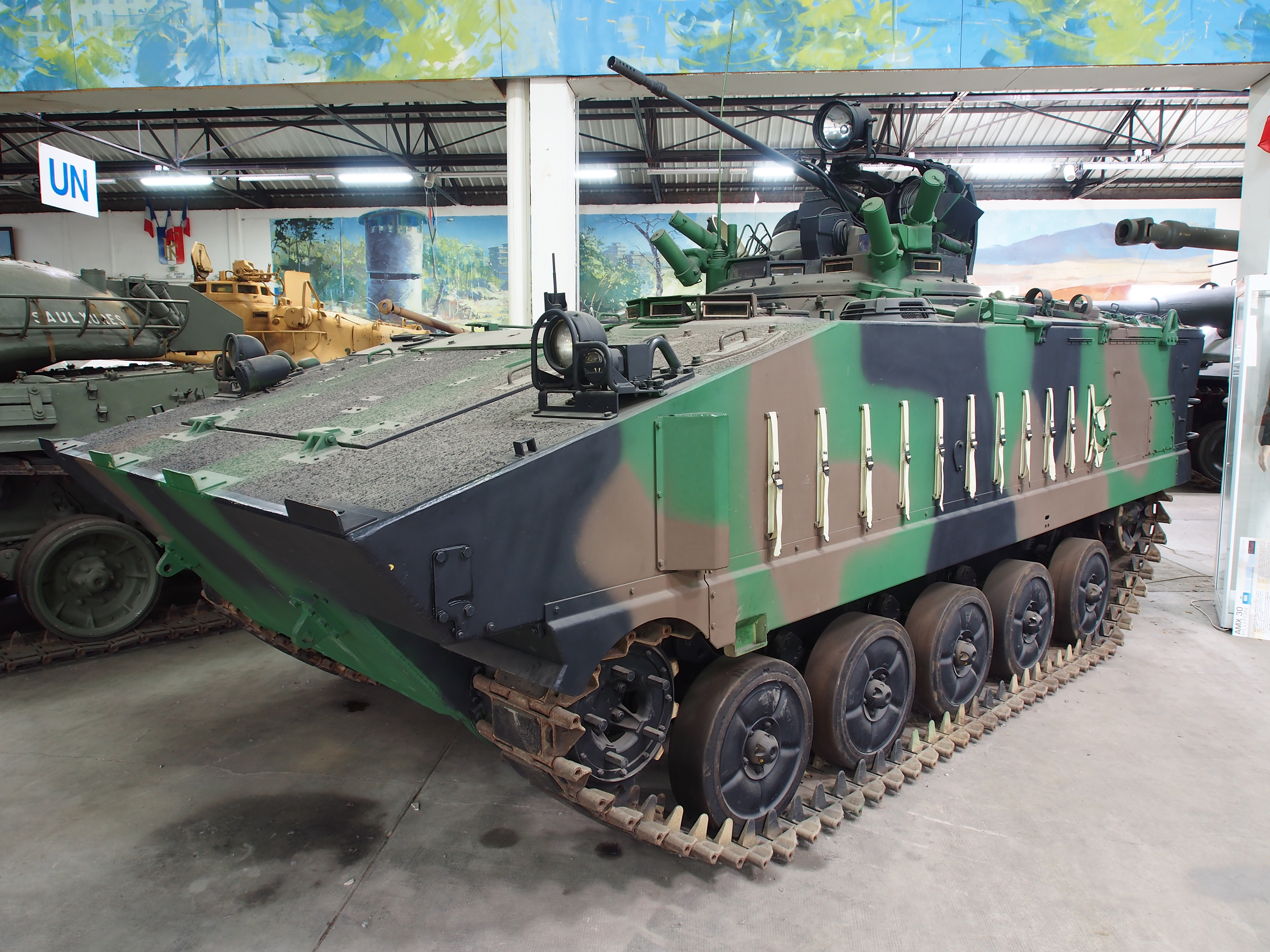
- An AMX-10P at the Musée des Blindés, Saumur.
- Type: Infantry fighting vehicle
- Place of origin: France

Service history
- Used by: See Operators
- Wars: Iran–Iraq War; Gulf War; Bosnian War; War in Iraq (2013–2017)

Production history
- Designed: 1968
- Manufacturer: GIAT Industries
- Produced: 1973–1994
- No. built: 1,750
- Variants: See Variants

Specifications
- Mass: 14.2 tonnes (15.7 short tons; 14.0 long tons)
- Length: 5.778 m (18 ft 11.5 in)
- Width: 2.78 m (9 ft 1 in)
- Height: 1.87 m (6 ft 2 in) (hull)
- Crew: 3 (commander, gunner, driver) + 8 passengers
- Main armament: 20 mm F2/M693 autocannon (800 rounds)
- Secondary armament: 7.62 mm MAS coaxial machine gun (2,000 rounds)
- Engine: Hispano-Suiza Model 115-2 eight-cylinder liquid-cooled diesel 205 kW (275 hp) at 3,000 rpm
- Power/weight: 14.9 kW/t (20.0 hp/t)
- Ground clearance: 0.45m
- Fuel capacity: 528 litres
- Operational range: 600 km (370 mi)
- Maximum speed: 65 km/h (40 mph)

The AMX-10P is a French amphibious infantry fighting vehicle. It was developed from 1965 onwards to replace the AMX-VCI in the French Army. It served with the French Army from its introduction in 1973 until its retirement in 2015, when it was fully replaced by the VBCI.

The AMX-10P was also successfully exported, and continues to serve with several nations' militaries. It was selected by a number of Arab armies and has been operated by Iraq, Qatar, Saudi Arabia, and the United Arab Emirates. Special marine variants were developed for Singapore and Indonesia, including the AMX-10 PAC 90 fire support version with a 90 mm gun.

The AMX-10P is fully amphibious, being propelled through water at speeds of up to 7 km/h by twin waterjets. It is fitted as standard with a trim vane and bilge pumps to assist with the flotation process. The AMX-10P shares a number of common transmission and chassis components with its wheeled counterpart, the AMX-10 RC.

== Development history ==
The AMX-10P was developed by the Atelier de Construction d'Issy-les-Moulineaux (AMX) in response to a French army requirement for a new tracked armoured fighting vehicle to supplement or replace the ageing AMX-VCI. The first prototypes were completed around 1968. They were showcased to potential domestic and international customers at Satory in 1969. Production did not commence until the French Army placed its first order in late 1972. The first AMX-10Ps were delivered in mid to late 1973 to the 7th Mechanised Brigade stationed at Reims.

French Army AMX-10Ps were fitted with a 20 mm autocannon in a Toucan II two-man turret with seating for a gunner and commander. Other one-man turrets could be fitted, as well as an observation cupola for training vehicles. Export variants of the AMX-10P abounded, including models equipped with battlefield surveillance radars, the ATILA artillery fire control system, a bank of HOT anti-tank missiles, 60 mm or 81 mm gun-mortars, and a large 90 mm gun.

Greece was the first foreign power to purchase the AMX-10P. Between 1974 and 1977 the Hellenic Army ordered over 100 vehicles in three separate variants. Qatar ordered 30 AMX-10Ps in 1975, while Iraq, Saudi Arabia and Indonesia accounted for large export orders during the early 1980s. GIAT Industries accepted a final order from Singapore for AMX-10P PAC-90s in 1994, following which the production lines were closed. At this point 1,750 AMX-10Ps had been manufactured.

108 AMX-10Ps underwent extensive overhauls to improve their armour and mobility between 2006 and 2008, including new gearboxes and suspension systems. By 2015, however, the AMX-10P had been entirely withdrawn from French service, being replaced by the VBCI.

== Description ==
AMX-10P hulls are fabricated from a welded steel or aluminum alloy and notable for their parallel incorporation of the driving and engine compartments. The driver is seated at the front of the vehicle and to the left. An AMX-10P's driving compartment is provided with a single hatch cover opening to the rear and three periscopes intended for observation purposes when the hatch is closed.

Night vision equipment was not fitted as standard to the base production model. One of the three driving periscopes could be replaced with combined day/night intensification sights as needed. The troop compartment is at the rear of the hull, and provided with two roof hatches. Passengers embark and debark from a ramp, which is accessed through two doors at the rear.

Transmission consists of a hydraulic torque converter coupled to a gearbox with one reverse and four forward driving gears. The AMX-10P utilises a torsion bar suspension, which supports five road wheels with the drive sprocket at the front and idler near the rear. These can be accessed from inside the hull through maintenance panels.

Standard AMX-10P turrets are equipped with a GIAT M693 automatic cannon firing two different types of both high explosive ammunition and armour-piercing ammunition. More than one ammunition type may be loaded at once and fired alternatively. The high explosive rounds have a muzzle velocity of 1,050 m/s. The latest armour-piercing round has a muzzle velocity of 1,300 m/s and is capable of penetrating 20 mm of rolled homogeneous armour at an incidence of 60°. The autocannon has a cyclic rate of fire of 740 rounds per minute, with the gunner being able to switch between semiautomatic, limited burst, or fully automatic fire as necessary.

=== External ===
AMX-10Ps have a very distinctive, pointed hull and a sloping glacis plate, with the driver's position plainly visible to the left. The hull roof is horizontal as well as sloped slightly inwards, accommodating a turret ring near the centre of the chassis. Both hull sides are vertical and lack firing ports. There is a circular exhaust outlet on the right side of the hull above the second and third road wheels.

== Variants ==
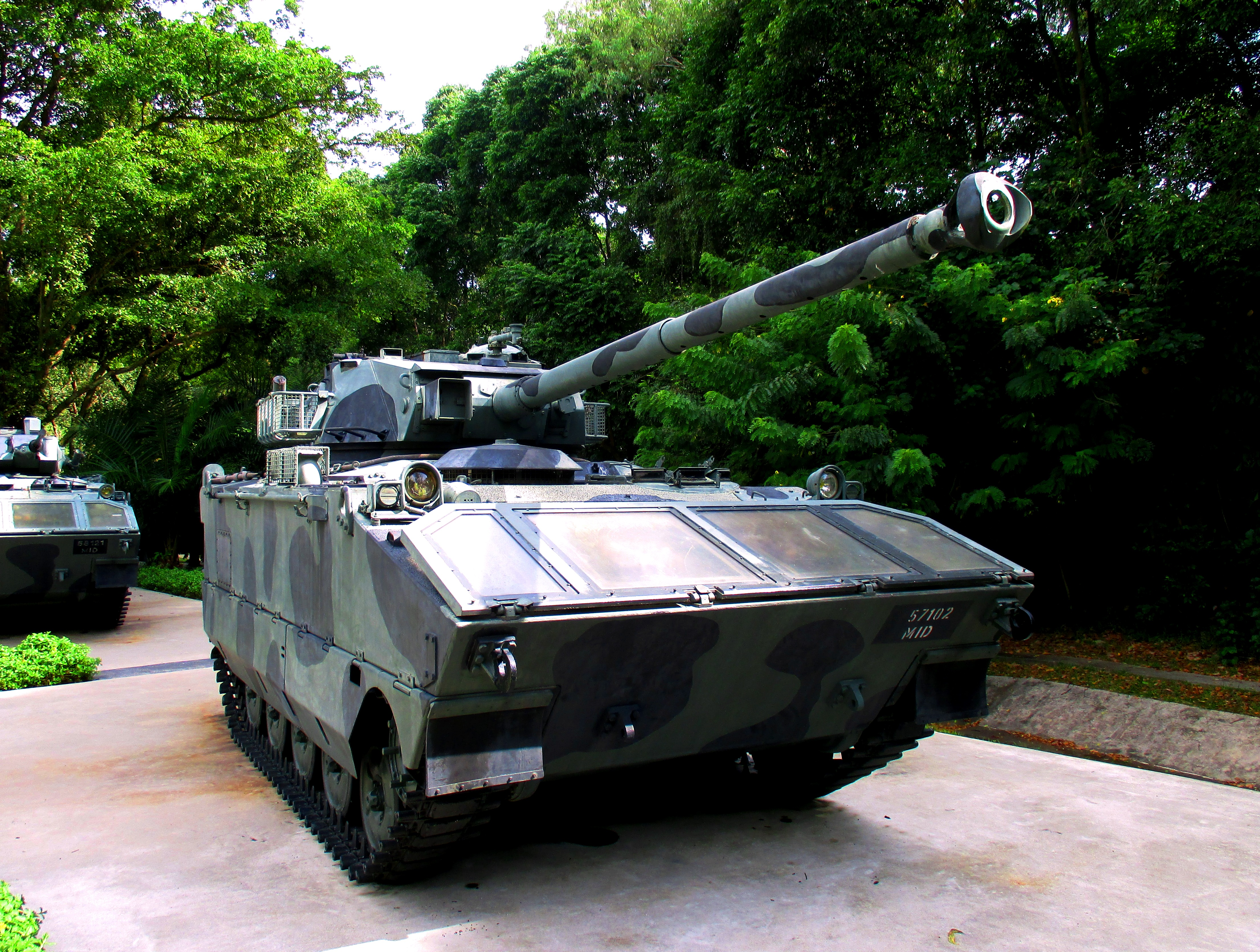
A Singapore Army AMX-10P PAC-90 with 90 mm gun

- AMX-10P: Standard production model. Armed with a two-man Toucan II turret and a M963 F2 20 mm autocannon.
- AMX-10P 25: AMX-10P with a one-man Dragar turret and a M811 25 mm autocannon. This was trialled by the French Army but not adopted into service. It was later adopted by the Singapore Armed Forces.
- AMX-10P Marine: AMX-10P with improved amphibious capabilities and a modified propulsion system that allowed for top speeds of up to 10 km/h in water. This variant was developed for the Indonesian Marine Corps.
- AMX-10P Sanitaire: A turretless AMX-10P designed as an ambulance vehicle. It carried a wide range of medical equipment.
- AMX-10ECH: AMX-10P modified as an armoured recovery vehicle, including a large hydraulic crane. Also known as the AMX-10D.
- AMX-10P/HOT: AMX-10P carrying HOT anti-tank missiles. Two external HOT launchers were located on either side of the hull, with an additional twenty missiles stored outside. This variant was developed for the Saudi Arabian Army. At least 92 were manufactured.
- AMX-10PC: AMX-10P modified as a command vehicle, including additional radios, a collapsible awning on either side of the hull, and a large generator on the hull roof.
- AMX-10 RATAC: An unarmed AMX-10P with a RATAC fire control radar mounted over its turret ring and a tracing table located inside the hull.
- AMX-10RAV: AMX-10P modified as a general cargo transporter. The French Army used this model to transport artillery ammunition.
- AMX-10RC: Wheeled variant of the AMX-10P developed for armed reconnaissance.
- AMX-10SAO: AMX-10P modified as a mobile forward artillery observation post. It possessed a long-range laser rangefinder in its turret, as well as a 7.62mm machine gun.
- AMX-10SAT: AMX-10P modified as an artillery survey vehicle. It was fitted with a custom navigation system.
- AMX-10TM: AMX-10P modified as an artillery tractor, with a new one-man turret and its rear ramp removed. It towed a F1 120 mm mortar and carried 60 mortar projectiles.
- AMX-10VOA: AMX-10P modified as a mobile forward artillery observation post. It possessed a slightly different turret from the AMX-10SAO.
- AMX-10VFA: AMX-10P carrying the ATILA artillery fire control system. This spawned two sub-variants of its own, the more simplified AMX-10VLA, and the more sophisticated AMX-10VFA.
- AMX-10P TMC-81: AMX-10P with an 81 mm breech loading, Hotchkiss-Brandt CL-81 gun-mortar. Similar in concept to the earlier CM60A1, the CL-81 fired both high explosive and armour-piercing shells.
- AMX-10P PAC-90: AMX-10P with the complete turret and 90 mm main gun assembly of the Panhard ERC-90 Sagaie armoured car. It carried 30 90 mm shells and 2,000 rounds of 7.62mm machine gun ammunition. This variant was marketed primarily to Indonesia and Singapore.
- AMX-10M: Modified AMX-10M to fitted the 142mm ACRA Launcher with 20mm secondary gun.

== Operators ==
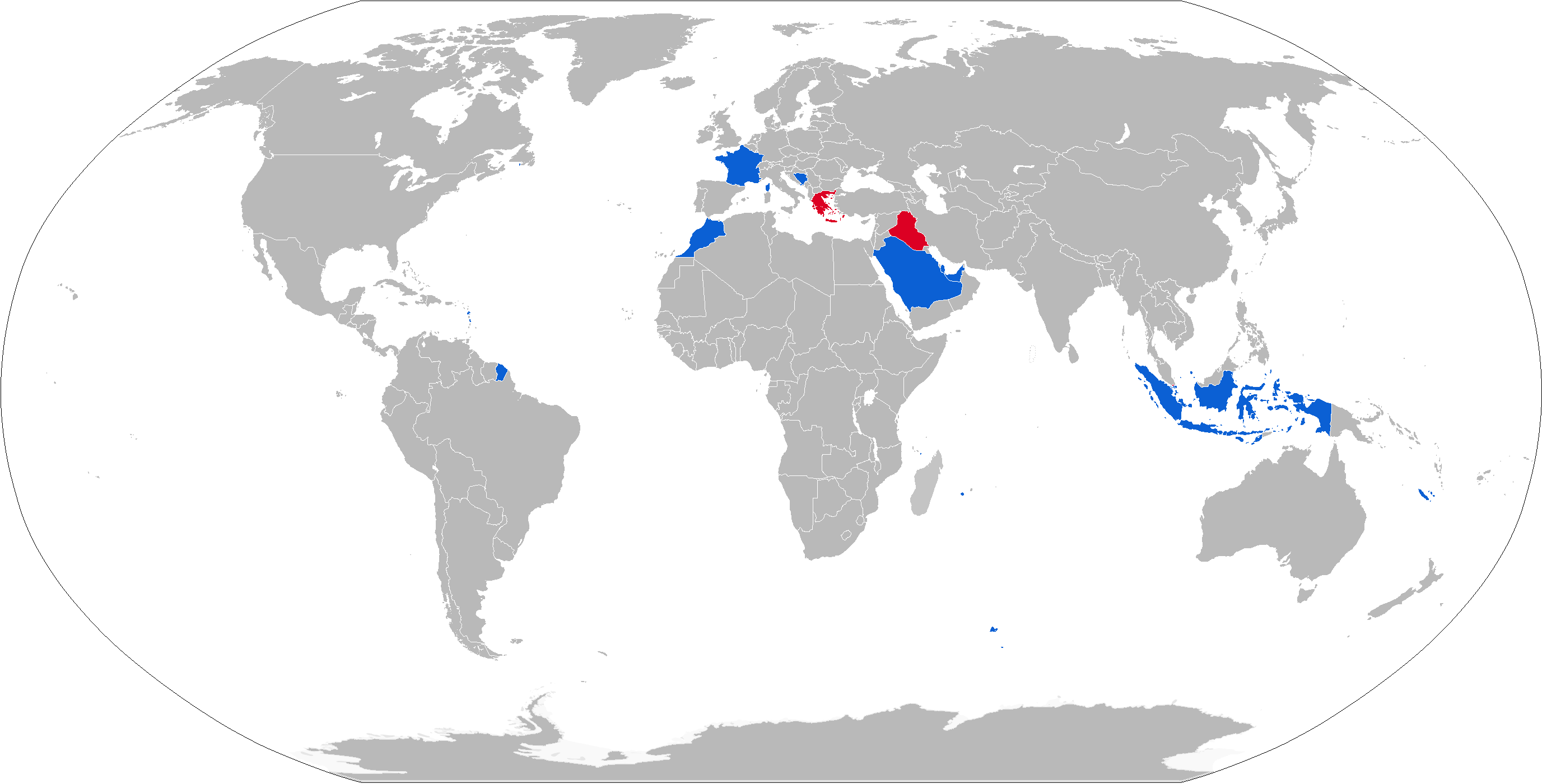
A map of AMX-10P operators in blue, with former operators in red.

- Indonesia: 180 including 80 AMX-10 PAC-90 purchased from France according to Museum Pusat TNI AL. 34 still in service with the Indonesian Marines as of 2024.
- Morocco: 10 currently in service.
- Qatar: 36 received from France. IISS reports 40 AMX-10P currently in service.
- Saudi Arabia: 293 purchased from France in 1974. IISS reports 380 AMX-10P and a further 90+ AMX-10P ATGM Carriers in service as of 2024.
- Singapore: 44 purchased from France in 1990. IISS reports 22 in storage as of 2024.

=== Former operators ===
- Bosnia-Herzegovina: 25 received from France in 1999.
- France: 331 in service in 2011; withdrawn from service in 2015.
- Greece: 69 purchased from France in 1974.
- Iraq: 29 received from France between 1981 and 1982; some modernized in 2015
- UAE: 15-18 purchased from France in 1976.

== In the popular culture ==
The production version of the AMX 10P is present in the game War Thunder as an SPAA. The modified AMX 10P with the 142mm ACRA Launcher, the AMX 10M, is also present in the game War Thunder as a Tank Destroyer.

== See also ==
=== AMX series ===
- AMX-13
- AMX-VCI
- AMX Mk F3
- AMX-10RC
- AMX-30
- AMX-40
- AMX-50

=== Vehicles of comparable role, performance, and era ===
- FV510 Warrior – (United Kingdom)
- Marder – (West Germany)
- Schützenpanzer Puma – (Germany)
- Dardo – (Italy)
- Bionix – (Singapore)
- BMP-2 – (Soviet Union)
- M2 Bradley – (United States)
