= NATO targets =

Standard armoured targets

NATO targets are a series of standard armoured targets defined by NATO designed to test the armour penetration of weapons. The purpose of the triple heavy target is to represent the difficulty a projectile would face in penetrating the skirt, roadwheel, and hull of a Soviet tank.

They are defined as:

Target type	Angle of target	First plate thickness	First plate hardness	First air gap	Second plate thickness	Second plate hardness	Second air gap	Third plate thickness	Third plate hardness
Single medium	60°	130 mm							
Single heavy	60°	150 mm	260-300 kp/mm^{2}						
Double medium	60°	40 mm		150 mm	90 mm				
Double heavy	60°	40 mm	308-353 kp/mm^{2}	150 mm	110 mm	260-300 kp/mm^{2}			
Triple medium	65°	10 mm		330 mm	25 mm		330 mm	60 mm	
Triple heavy	65°	10 mm	412-438 kp/mm^{2}	330 mm	25 mm	100-122 kp/mm^{2}	330 mm	80 mm	308-353 kp/mm^{2}
