= Republic of China Army =

Ground branch of Taiwan's military

- Emblem of the Republic of China Army
- Founded: 16 June 1924; 102 years ago (as the National Revolutionary Army); 1 June 1946; 80 years ago (as the Republic of China Army)
- Country: Republic of China
- Type: Ground Force
- Role: Ground warfare
- Size: 94,000 (2024)
- Part of: Republic of China Armed Forces
- Garrison/HQ: Longtan, Taoyuan, Republic of China
- Mottos: 親愛精誠 ("qīnàijīngchéng"; English: "Devoted and Sincere Love")
- Colors: Gold; Green
- March: 陸軍軍歌 ("Lùjūnjūngē"; "Liu̍k-kiûn Kiûn-kô"; English: "The Army Song")
- Engagements: Northern Expedition; Sino-Soviet conflict (1929); Kumul Rebellion; Sino-Tibetan War of 1930–1932; Long March; Islamic rebellion in Xinjiang (1937); Second Sino-Japanese War; World War II; Chinese Civil War; Battle of Baitag Bogd; Chinese Communist Revolution; Battle of Guningtou; Battle of Nanri Island; First Taiwan Strait Crisis; Battle of Dachen Archipelago; Battle of Yijiangshan Islands; 1960–61 campaign at the China–Burma border; Second Taiwan Strait Crisis; Communist insurgency in Thailand; Third Taiwan Strait Crisis; War on terror; Military intervention against ISIL
- Website: Chinese; English

Commanders
- Commander of the Army: General Lu Kun-hsiu
- Deputy Commander of the Republic of China Army: Lieutenant-General Li Tian-long
- Deputy Commander of the Republic of China Army: Lieutenant-General Chang Tai-sung

Insignia
- Roundel

- Flag

- Unit colour

Aircraft flown
- Attack helicopter: AH-1W, AH-64E
- Cargo helicopter: CH-47SD, UH-60M
- Observation helicopter: OH-58D
- Trainer helicopter: TH-67A
- Utility helicopter: UH-60M

Chinese name
- Traditional Chinese: 中華民國陸軍
- Simplified Chinese: 中华民国陆军
Transcriptions
Standard Mandarin
- Hanyu Pinyin: Zhōnghuá Mínguó Lùjūn
- Bopomofo: ㄓㄨㄥ ㄏㄨㄚˊ ㄇㄧㄣˊ ㄍㄨㄛˊ ㄌㄨˋ ㄐㄩㄣ
- Wade–Giles: Chung^{1}-hua^{2} Min^{2}-kuo^{2} Lu^{4}-chün^{1}
- Tongyong Pinyin: Jhonghuá Mínguó Lùjyun
- Yale Romanization: Jūnghwá Míngwó Lùjyūn
- IPA: [ʈʂʊ́ŋxwǎ mǐnkwǒ lûtɕýn]
other Mandarin
- Xiao'erjing: ژْوڭخُوَا مِنْقُوَ لُوٗجُنْ
Hakka
- Romanization: Chûng-fà Mìn-koet Liu̍k-kiûn
Southern Min
- Hokkien POJ: Tiong-hôa-bîn-kok Lio̍k-kun

The Republic of China Army (Chinese: 中華民國陸軍; pinyin: Zhōnghuá Mínguó Lùjūn) also known as the ROC Army (ROCA); colloquially the Taiwanese Army (Chinese: 台灣陸軍; pinyin: Táiwān lùjūn) by western or mainland Chinese media, or commonly referred to as the National Army (Chinese: 國軍陸軍; pinyin: Guó jūn lùjūn) by local Taiwanese people, is the largest branch of Taiwan's military, the Republic of China Armed Forces.

An estimated 80% of the ROCA is based on the Main Island of Taiwan, while the remainder are stationed on the Penghu, Kinmen, Matsu, Dongsha, and Taiping Islands. This branch was also referred to historically as the Chinese Army and the Nationalist Chinese Army during and after World War II and the 1949 retreat.

Since the Chinese Civil War, no armistice or peace treaty has ever been signed between the Republic of China regime and the communist regime, so as the final line of defense against a possible invasion by the People's Liberation Army (PLA), the primary focus of the ROCA is on defense and counterattack against amphibious assault and urban warfare.

== Organization ==
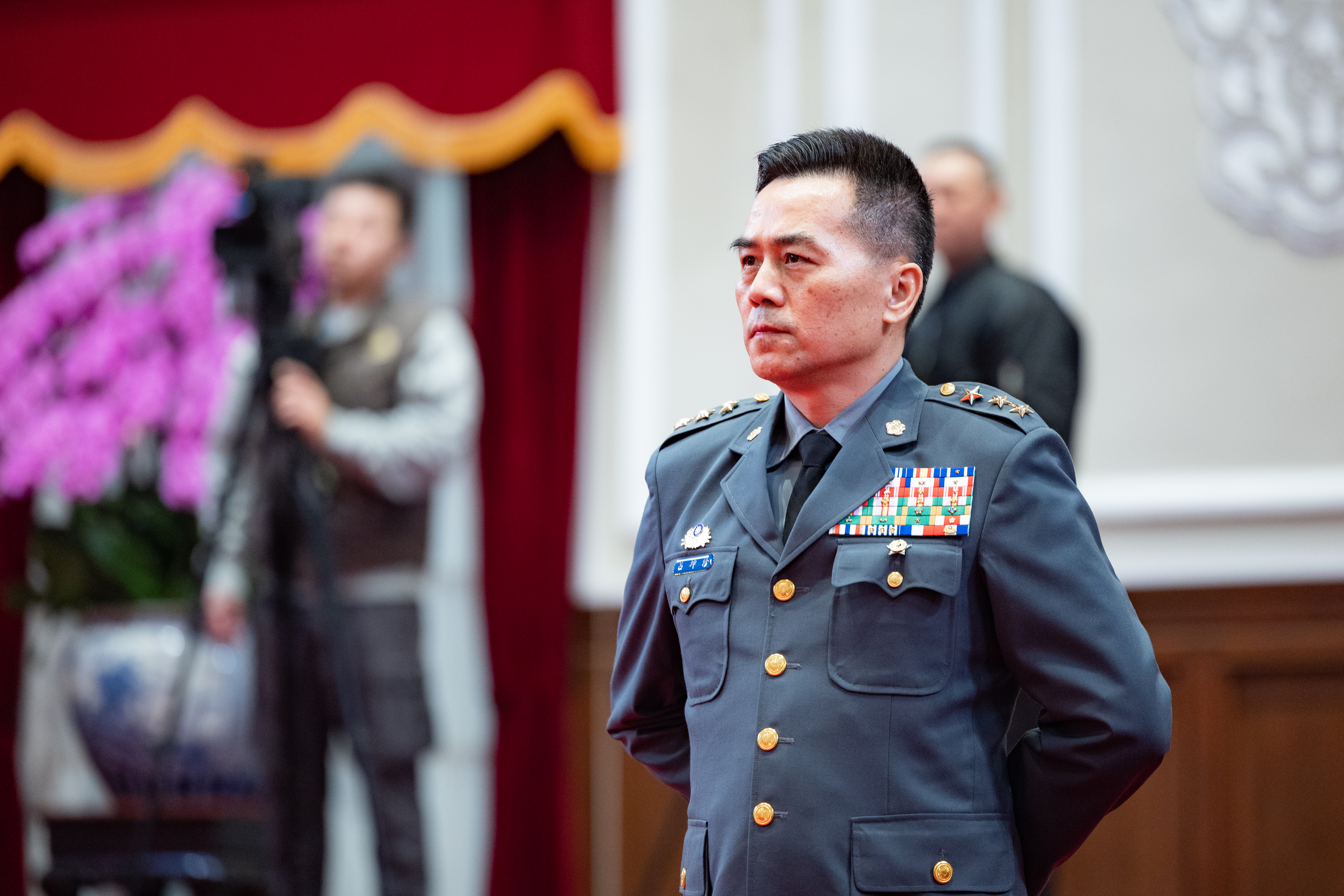
General Lu Kun-hsiu, the incumbent commander of the ROC Army

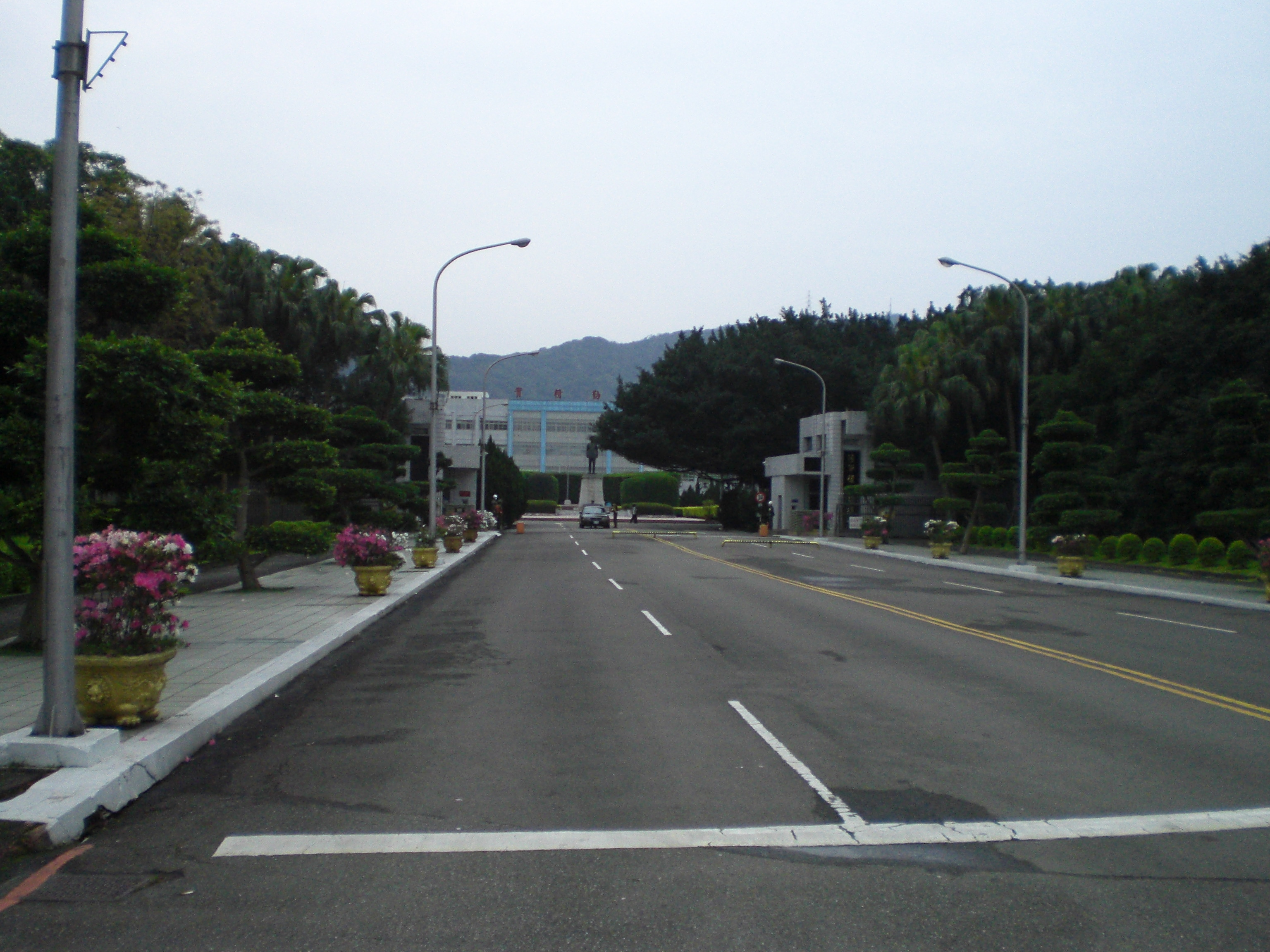
ROC Army Logistics Command

The ROC Army's current operational strength includes three armies, five corps. As of 2005, the Army's 35 brigades include 25 infantry brigades, five armoured brigades and three mechanized infantry brigades. All infantry brigades stood down and transferred to Reserve Command after 2005.

This update reflects the ROCA order of battle at the conclusion of the Jinjing Restructuring Plan in 2008.

A new type of unit called defense team (守備隊) is being introduced. These are formed by elements of de-activated brigades under each area defense command. The strength of a defense team may vary from one or more reinforced battalions, making it roughly equal to a regiment. The team CO is usually a full colonel.

In the event of war most of the high command would retreat to underground bunkers, tunnel complexes, and command posts.

=== Republic of China Army Command Headquarters ===
The ROC Army CHQ (中華民國國防部陸軍司令部) is headed by a 3-star general and is responsible for overall command of all ROC Army assets. Army GHQ is subordinate to the Chief of the General Staff (military), the Minister of National Defense (civilian) and the ROC President.
- Internal Units: Personnel, Combat Readiness and Training, Logistics, Planning, Communications, Electronics and Information, General Affairs, Comptroller, Inspector General, Political Warfare.
- Aviation and Special Forces Command (航空特戰指揮部)

- 601 Aviation Brigade (original special force battalion assigned transferred back to Special Forces Command)
- 602 Aviation Brigade (original special force battalion assigned transferred back to Special Forces Command)
- Army Flight Training Command (Converted to the 603 Aviation Brigade during the war)
- Special Forces Command (特戰指揮部, originally 862nd Special Operation Brigade)

- Head Quarters Company
- Sniper Company
- Communications Information Company
- Airborne Special Service Company
- 101st Reconnaissance Battalion (better known as Sea Dragon Frogman, has a company station in Kinmen, Matsu, 3 in Penghu, and other frontline islands)
- Special Force 1st Battalion
- Special Force 2nd Battalion
- Special Force 3rd Battalion
- Special Force 4th Battalion
- Special Force 5th Battalion

- Airborne Training Center
- Special Warfare Training Center

- 6th Army Corps (第六軍團指揮部): Northern Taiwan

- Guandu Area Command
- Lanyang Area Command
- 269 Mechanized Infantry Brigade
- 542 Armor Brigade
- 584 Armor Brigade
- 21 Artillery Command
- 53 Engineer Group
- 73 Signals Group
- 33 Chemical Warfare Group

- 8th Army Corps (第八軍團指揮部): Southern Taiwan

- 333 Mechanized Infantry Brigade
- 564 Armor Brigade
- 43 Artillery Command
- 54 Engineer Group
- 75 Signals Group
- 39 Chemical Warfare Group

- 10th Army Corps (第十軍團指揮部): Central Taiwan

- 234 Mechanized Infantry Brigade (will receive CM32 "Clouded Leopard" wheeled IFV beginning of 2011)
- 586 Armor Brigade
- 58 Artillery Command
- 52 Engineer Group
- 36 Chemical Warfare Group
- 74 Signals Group

- Hua-Tung Defense Command (花東防衛指揮部): Eastern Taiwan

- Hualien (花蓮) Defense Team

- Mixed Artillery Battalion
- 1st Combined Arms Battalion
- 2nd Combined Arms Battalion
- Infantry Battalion
- drone squadron

- Taitung (台東) Area Command

- Mixed Artillery Battalion
- 1st Combined Arms Battalion
- 2nd Combined Arms Battalion
- drone squadron

- Kinmen Defense Command (金門防衛指揮部)

- Kiman (金門, Kinmen) Defense Team

- Beiding Garrison
- Caoyu Garrison
- Houyu Garrison
- Tank Battalion
- Mechanized Infantry Battalion
- 1st Infantry Battalion
- 2nd Infantry Battalion
- Jin Dong Reserve Infantry Battalion
- Jin west Reserve Infantry Battalion

- Lieyu (烈嶼) Defense Team

- Infantry Battalion
- Tank Company (M60A3tts tank)
- Mechanized Infantry Company
- Mixed Artillery Company
- Garrison:Dadan Garrison, Erdan Garrison, Menghuyu Garrison, Dongding Garrison, Shiyu Garrison, Fuxingyu Garrison.

- Field mixed artillery battalion

- Penghu Defense Command (澎湖防衛指揮部)

- 1 Infantry Battalion, 1 Armored Battalion, 1 Armored Infantry Battalion, 1 Armored Cav Battalion, 1 mixed Artillery Battalion

- Matsu Defense Command (馬祖防衛指揮部)

- Nangan (南竿) Defense Team
- Beigan (北竿) Defense Team
- Juguang (莒光) Defense Team

- Dongyin Area Command (東引地區指揮部)

- Logistics Command (後勤指揮部)
  - Ordnance Maintenance and Development Center
  - Automobile Base Service Plant
  - Missile Optoelectronics Base Service Plant
  - Communications Electronics Equipment Base Service Plant
  - Army Aviation Base Service Plant
  - First Regional Support Command
  - Second Regional Support Command
  - Third Regional Support Command
  - Fourth Regional Support Command
  - Fifth Regional Support Command
  - Kinmen Regional Support Battalion
  - Matsu Regional Support Battalion

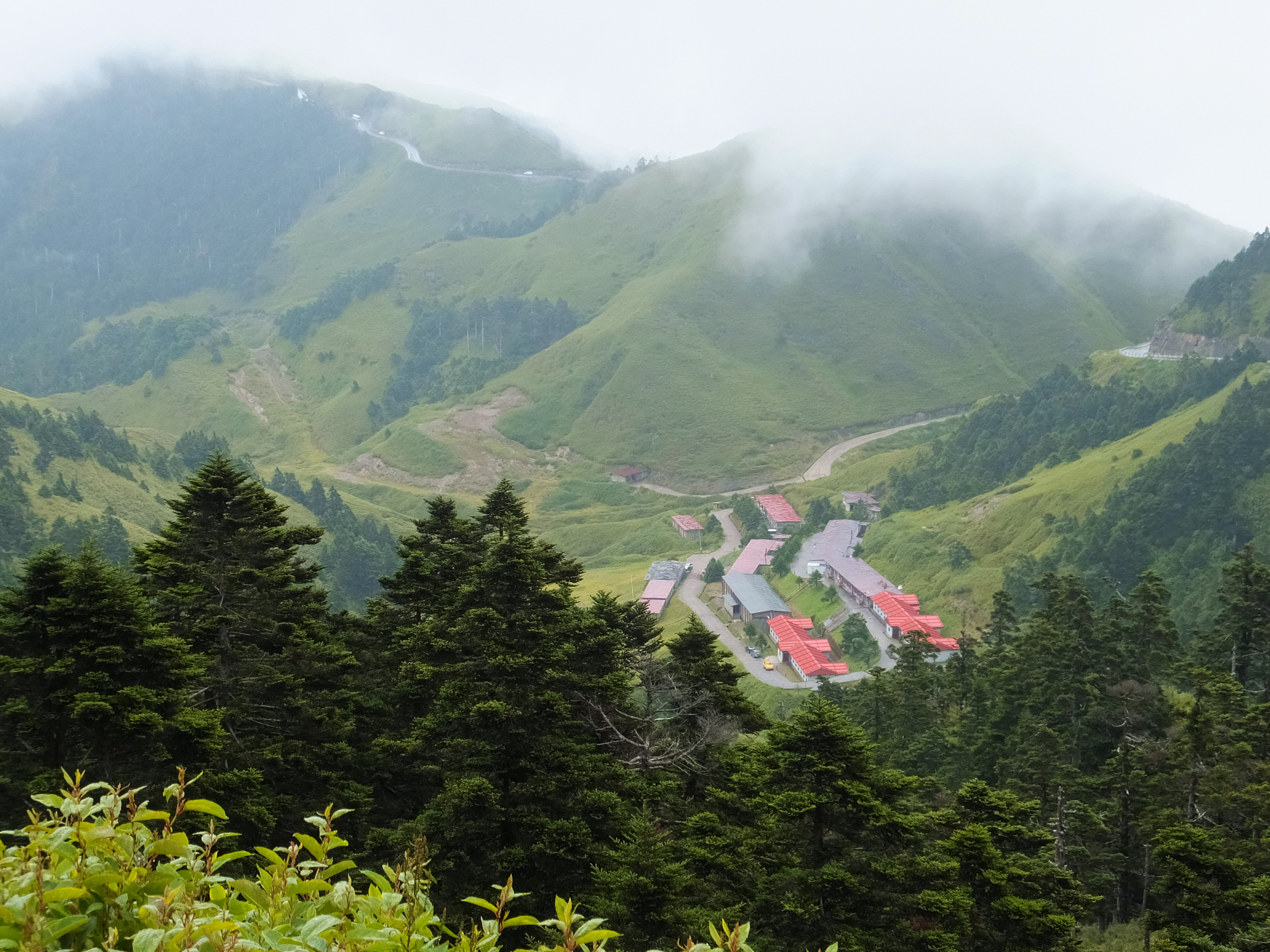
Winter and Mountain Training Center, located in the Hehuan Valley

- Education, Training and Doctrine Command (教育訓練暨準則發展指揮部)
  - Republic of China Military Academy
  - Army Training North Joint Testing and Examination Center
  - Army Training South Joint Testing and Examination Center
  - Artillery Testing and Examination Center
  - Infantry Training Command
  - Armored Training Command
  - Artillery Training Command
  - Chemical, Biological, Radiological, and Nuclear Training Center
  - Engineer Training Center
  - Communications, Electronics, and Information Training Center
  - Signature Training Center
  - Logistics Training Center
  - Airborne Training Center (大武營「陸軍空降訓練中心」)
  - Special Forces Training Center (谷關「陸軍特戰訓練中心」)
  - Winter and Mountain Training Center (武嶺寒訓中心)
  - Unmanned Systems Training Command (originally UAV Training Center)

- Armed Force Reserve Command (後備指揮部)

- 11 infantry brigades

- 101 Infantry Brigade (tactical command: 10th Army Corps)
- 104 Infantry Brigade (tactical command: 10th Army Corps)
- 109 Infantry Brigade (tactical command: 6th Army Corps)
- 117 Infantry Brigade (tactical command: 8th Army Corps)
- 137 Infantry Brigade (tactical command: 8th Army Corps)
- 153 Infantry Brigade (tactical command: 6th Army Corps)
- 203 Infantry Brigade (tactical command: 8th Army Corps)
- 206 Infantry Brigade (tactical command: 6th Army Corps)
- 249 Infantry Brigade (tactical command: 6th Army Corps)
- 257 Infantry Brigade (tactical command: 10th Army Corps)
- 302 Infantry Brigade (tactical command: 10th Army Corps)

- Northern Area Reserve Command
  - Keelung City Reserve Brigade
  - Taipei City Reserve Brigade
  - New Taipei City Reserve Brigade
  - Taoyuan City Reserve Brigade
  - Hsinchu Reserve Brigade
  - Yilan County Reserve Brigade
  - Hualien County Reserve Brigade
  - Lianjiang County Reserve Brigade
  - Northern Region First Reserve Force Training Center

- Central Area Reserve Command
  - Miaoli County Reserve Brigade
  - Taichung City Reserve First Brigade
  - Taichung City Reserve Second Brigade
  - Changhua County Reserve Brigade
  - Nantou County Reserve Brigade
  - Yunlin County Reserve Brigade
  - Chiayi Reserve Brigade
  - Central Region Reserve Forces Training Center

- Southern Area Reserve Command
  - Tainan City Reserve Brigade
  - Kaohsiung City Reserve First Brigade
  - Kaohsiung City Reserve Second Brigade
  - Pingtung County Reserve Brigade
  - Taitung County Reserve Brigade
  - Penghu County Reserve Brigade
  - Kinmen County Reserve Brigade
  - Southern Region Reserve Forces Training Center

- 24 Reserve brigades (Activated only in time of war)

ROC Army's former Army Missile Command was transferred to ROC Air Force in 2006.

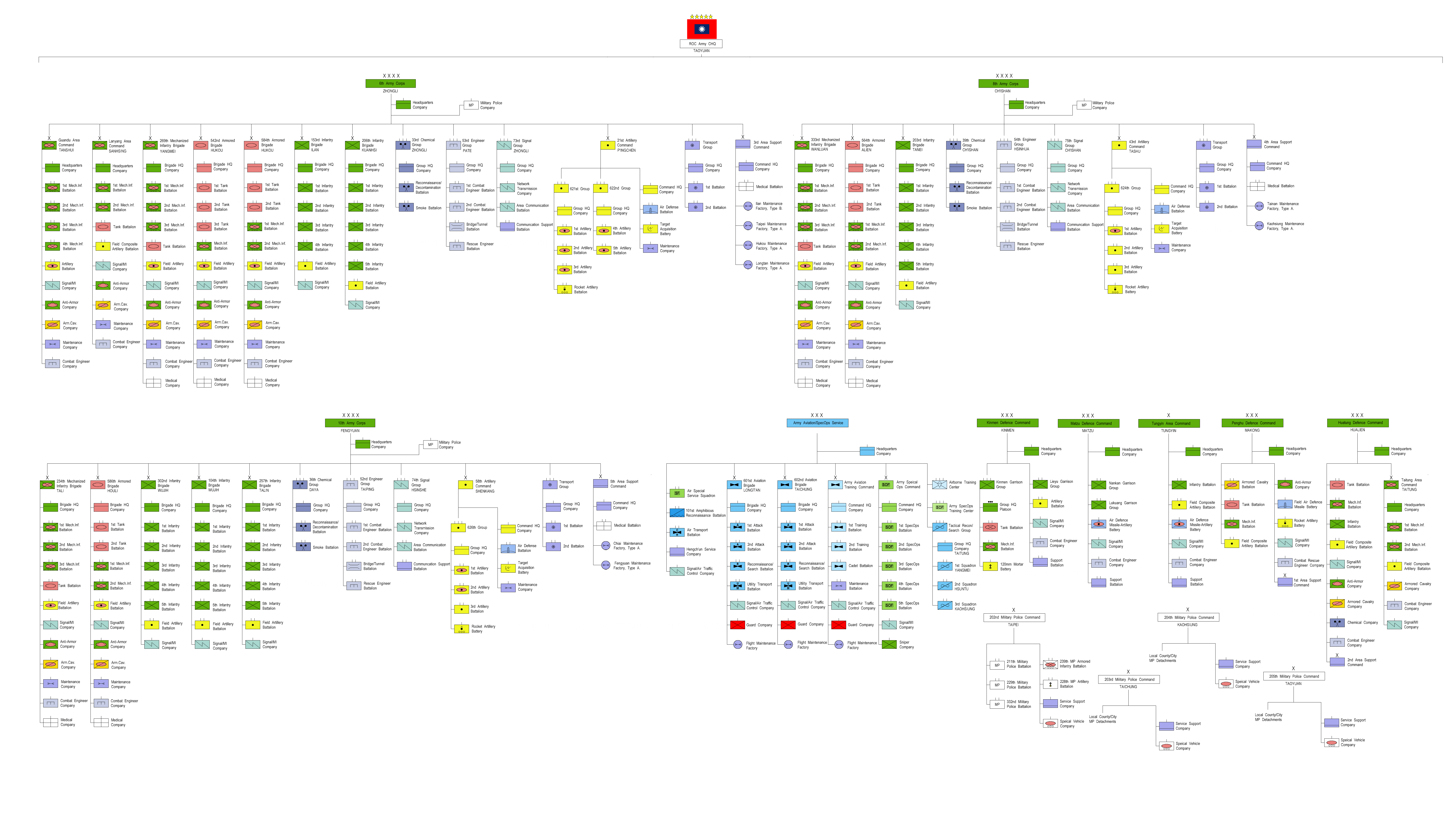
Republic of China Army Organization as of 2016

== Ranks ==
=== Commissioned officer ranks ===
The rank insignia of commissioned officers.

Rank group	General / flag officers				Senior officers			Junior officers
Republic of China Army
Republic of China Army	一級上將; Yījí shàngjiàng	二級上將; Èrjí shàngjiàng	中將; Zhōngjiàng	少將; Shàojiàng	上校; Shàngxiào	中校; Zhōngxiào	少校; Shàoxiào	上尉; Shàngwèi	中尉; Zhōngwèi	少尉; Shàowèi

=== Other ranks ===
The rank insignia of non-commissioned officers and enlisted personnel.

Rank group	Senior NCOs					Junior NCOs		Enlisted
Republic of China Army
Republic of China Army	一等士官長; Yīděng shìguānzhǎng	二等士官長; Èrděng shìguānzhǎng	三等士官長; Sānděng shìguānzhǎng	上士; Shàngshì	中士; Zhōngshì	下士; Xiàshì	上等兵; Shàngděngbīng	一等兵; Yīděngbīng	二等兵; Èrděngbīng

=== Training ===
The Republic of China Military Academy, established in 1924, trains officers for the army in a four-year collegiate course of study, after which they graduate with an officer's commission and a bachelor's degree.

In 2025 the Army opened a dedicated unmanned aerial vehicle training center. The center is located in Tainan and offers training to both operational and support personal.

== History ==
=== The Army of the Nationalist Chinese regime ===
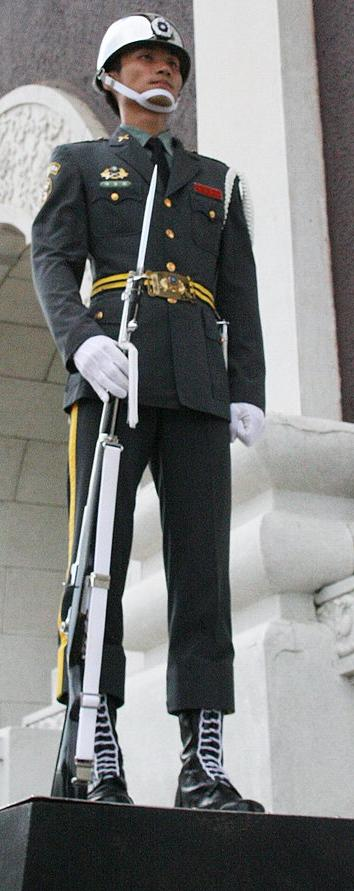
An honor guard at the National Martyrs' Shrine in Taipei

The Republic of China Army originated from the National Revolutionary Army of the Nationalist Chinese regime, which was founded by Sun Yat-sen's Kuomintang (KMT) in 1924, when the Whampoa Military Academy was established with Soviet military assistance.

Whampoa Military Academy, which was presided by Chiang Kai-shek, was tasked with the objective of training a professional Chinese revolutionary army (革命軍人) to unify China during the Warlord Era. It participated in the Northern Expedition, the Second Sino-Japanese War (during World War II) and the Chinese Civil War before withdrawing of the ROC government to Taiwan in 1949.

=== Retreat to Taiwan ===
After 1949, the ROC Army has participated in combat operations on Kinmen and the Dachen Archipelago against the PLA in the Battle of Kuningtou, and in the First and Second Taiwan Strait Crisis. In addition to these major conflicts, ROCA commandos were regularly sent to raid the Fujian and Guangdong coasts. Until the 1970s, the stated mission of the Army was to retake the mainland from the People's Republic of China. Following the lifting of martial law in 1987 and the democratization of the 1990s, the mission of the ROC Army has been shifted to the defense of Taiwan, Penghu, Kinmen and Matsu from a PLA invasion.

=== Modern Era ===
With the reduction of the size of the ROC armed forces in recent years, the Army has endured the largest number of cutbacks as ROC military doctrine has begun to emphasize the importance of offshore engagement with the Navy and Air Force. Subsequent to this shift in emphasis, the ROC Navy and Air Force have taken precedence over the ROC Army in defense doctrine and weapons procurement. Recent short-term goals in the Army include acquisition and development of joint command and control systems, advanced attack helicopters and armored vehicles, multiple launch rocket system and field air defense systems. The Army is also in the process of transitioning to an all volunteer force.

During the COVID-19 pandemic Army chemical warfare units were used to disinfect public areas and to do spot disinfections around known disease clusters. In January 2021 the 33rd Chemical Warfare Group was deployed to Taoyuan City to deal with a cluster of infections around a hospital there.

== Equipment ==
From the 1990s onwards, the Republic of China Army launched several upgrade programmes to replace outdated equipment with more advanced weapons, also increasing its emphasis on forces that could be rapidly deployed and were suited for combat in Taiwan's heavily urbanized environment. Orders were placed with the United States for M60A3 Patton tanks, M109A5 "Paladin" howitzers and AH-1W SuperCobra attack helicopters, as well as updating existing equipment.

Along with the other ROC military branches, the ROC Army has extensive experience in the construction and utilization of tunnels and bases gained during the People's Republic of China's bombardments of Kinmen and Matsu during the Cold War and many facilities are rumoured to be located underground in undisclosed locations.

The U.S. Government announced on October 3, 2008, that it planned to sell $6.5 billion worth of arms to Taiwan, ending the freeze of arms sales. Amongst other things, the plans include $2.532 billion worth of 30 AH-64D Apache Longbow Block III Attack helicopters with night-vision sensors, radar, 173 Stinger Block I air-to-air missiles and 1000 AGM-114L Hellfire missiles. and 182 Javelin missiles will also be available with 20 Javelin command launchers and is estimated to cost $47 million.

On January 29, 2010, US Government announced 5 notifications to US Congress for arms sales to Taiwan. Of the total 6.392 billion US dollars in the 5 announcements, ROC Army will receive 60 UH-60M and other related things for cost of 3.1 Billion.

=== Aviation Assets ===
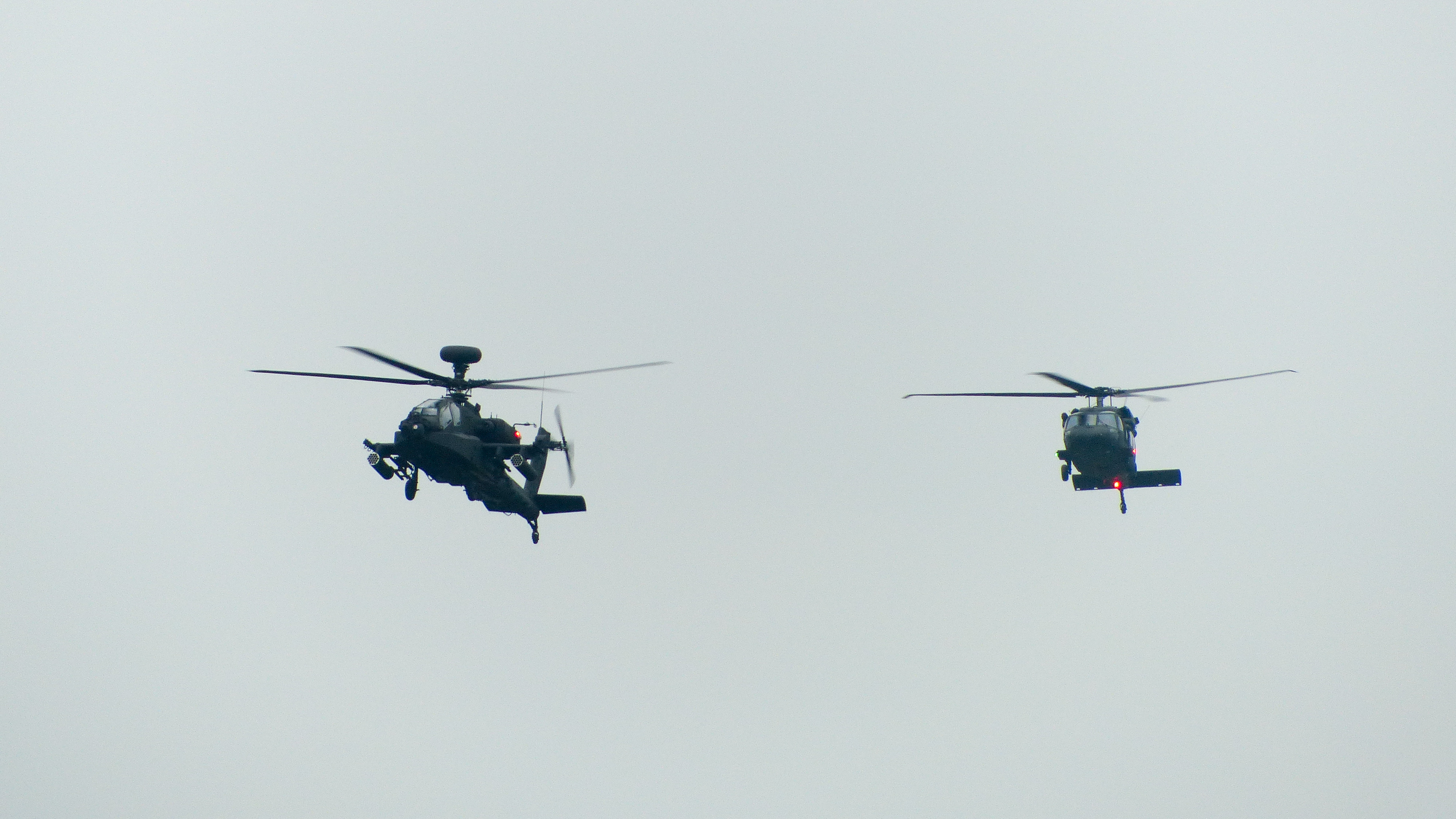
ROCA AH-64E 802 and UH-60M 912 in flight over Hongchailin Camp

In July 2007 it was reported that the ROC Army would request the purchase of 30 AH-64E Apache Guardian attack helicopters from the US in the 2008 defence budget. In October 2015 it was announced that 9 AH-64E had been grounded due to oxidation of components in the helicopters' tail rotor gearboxes and comprehensive safety checks were made on all Apaches. The 2008 defense budget also listed a request for 60 UH-60M Black Hawk helicopters as a partial replacement for the UH-1Hs currently in service.

=== Main battle tanks ===
As of 2019, the ROC army had 480 M60A3s, 450 CM11s (modified M48 turrets mated to M60 chassis), and 250 CM12s (CM11 turrets mated to M48 hulls and since retired from service). The design and technology used in the tanks date back to the 1940s and 1950s, including their 105 mm rifled gun and utilizing traditional steel armor plating rather than composite materials used in modern armored fighting vehicles. It is expected that the majority of the ROC Army's armored units would continue to be equipped with legacy tanks in upgraded form after the army acquires the newer modern tanks. As of 2015, some CM11 tanks were observed to be upgraded with explosive reactive armor around the turret and hull.

In October 2017, Taiwan announced an upgrade program for 450 M60A3s consisting of replacing the main gun with a new 120 mm weapon, as well as upgrading the ballistics computer, turret hydraulics, and other systems. Testing and evaluation are expected to be completed in 2019 and application of new features to start in 2020. However, in July 2018 the Ministry of National Defense renewed its interest in acquiring Abrams, and had set aside US$990 million to purchase 108 M1A2s while modernization of existing M60A3s in service continues.

On June 7, 2019, Taiwan's Ministry of National Defense confirmed that Taiwan has signed a $2 billion weapons deal with the Trump administration, which includes a purchase of 108 M1A2T (M1A2C export variant for Taiwan) Abrams battle tanks. Taiwanese defense officials intend to use the M1A2T Abrams battle tank to replace its army's M60A3 and M48H CM11 tanks. On July 8, 2019, the U.S. State Department approved the sale of new M1A2T Abrams tanks to Taiwan despite criticism and protest of the deal from the People's Republic of China (PRC). The deal includes 122 M2 Mounted Machine Guns, 216 M240 machine guns, 14 M88A2 Hercules vehicles, and 16 M1070A1 Heavy Equipment Transporters. General Dynamics Land Systems will build the tanks at Anniston Army Depot, Alabama, and at Joint Systems Manufacturing Center in Lima, Ohio. The final signing of the Letter of Offer and Acceptance (LOA) was confirmed on December 21, 2019. The tanks represent the first sale of new tanks to the ROC Army in decades from the US. Surplus M1A1 tanks were previously rejected by previous US administrations, including George W. Bush in 2001. Current ROC tanks include used M60A3 tanks and locally manufactured M48 tanks in which the initial variants were first produced between the 1950s and 1960s. The first batch of 38 tanks were received on December 16, 2024, with the remaining tanks to be delivered in two more batches, the second one in 2025 and the final one in 2026.

Some criticisms were made of these M1 Abrams purchases: some analysts expressed that Taiwan's terrain and some of its bridges and roads are unsuitable for the 60-tonne M1A2. However, Taiwan's current tanks have older 105-millimeter rifled guns that may not be able to readily penetrate the frontal armor of modern People's Liberation Army (PLA) Type 96 and Type 99 tanks, which can easily penetrate the Patton's old-fashioned steel armor with their smoothbore 125 mm ZPT-98 main gun. The M1A2T tank's 120 mm gun is capable of destroying PLA tanks without reliance on anti-tank missiles. Moreover, tanks can be used as mobile reserves for counterattacks against PLA beach landings, which was successful during the Battle of Guningtou. ROC Army Chief of Staff, Yang Hai-ming, said that China's best tank, the heavy Type 99 tank, would not be able to be transported in an amphibious invasion during a potential war with Taiwan and the PLA would have to rely on the much lighter 20-ton Type 63A tanks. Due to this logistics issue for the PLA there is less concern about the M1A2T tanks having to deal with China's most modern tanks during an amphibious invasion.

=== Infantry vehicles ===
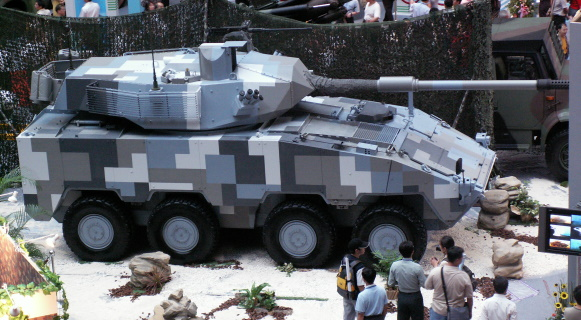
The CM32 armoured vehicle, currently under production (mobile-gun platform variant is shown)

CM32 Clouded Leopard, an 8x8 armoured personnel carrier locally manufactured, will replace ageing M113s and V-150 armoured vehicles. It is a modular vehicle platform capable of accepting various configurations for specific combat requirements. As of 2019, an IFV version of Yunpao armed with Orbital ATK 30 mm Mk44 Bushmaster II cannons, CM34, is planned for production. Production of a version with a 105 mm assault gun, which is modeled on that of the CM11 Brave Tiger main battle tank, is also scheduled to be completed by 2023.

=== Air defense ===
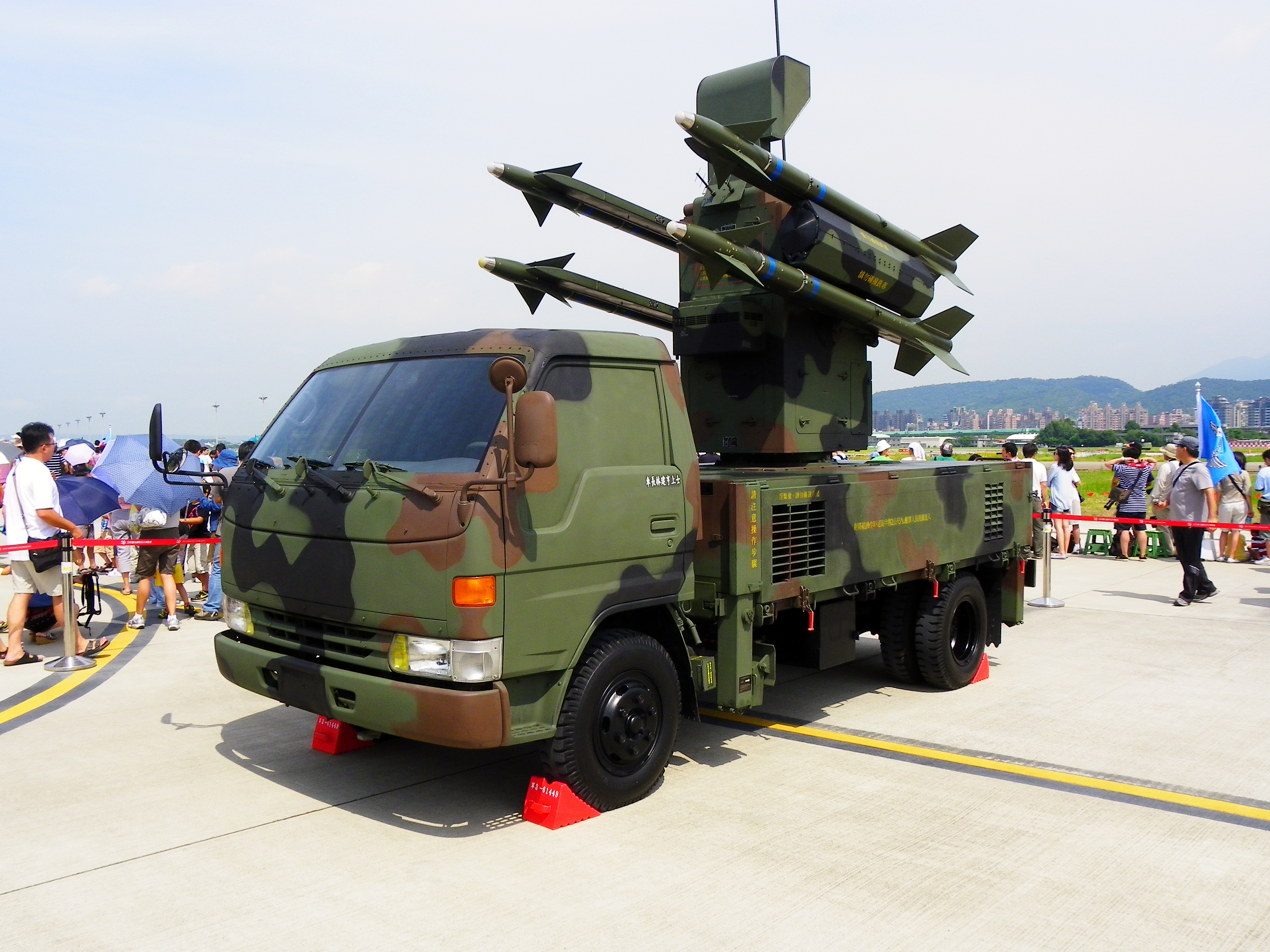
Antelope air defense system

Long and medium range air defense systems are operated by the Republic of China Air Force with the Army assuming much of the SHORAD mission. The most modern air defense system of the Army is the US-made Avenger.

The ROCA is in the process of fielding the Surface-to-Air TC-2 medium range air defense system. Development of a surface launched TC-2 began with the ROCN in 1994.

On June 7, 2019, Taiwan's Ministry of National Defense confirmed that Taiwan has signed a $2 billion weapons deal with the Trump administration, which includes a purchase of "250 surface-to-air Stinger missile systems." Taiwan's ROC Army already has 2,223 Stinger missile systems.

=== Artillery ===
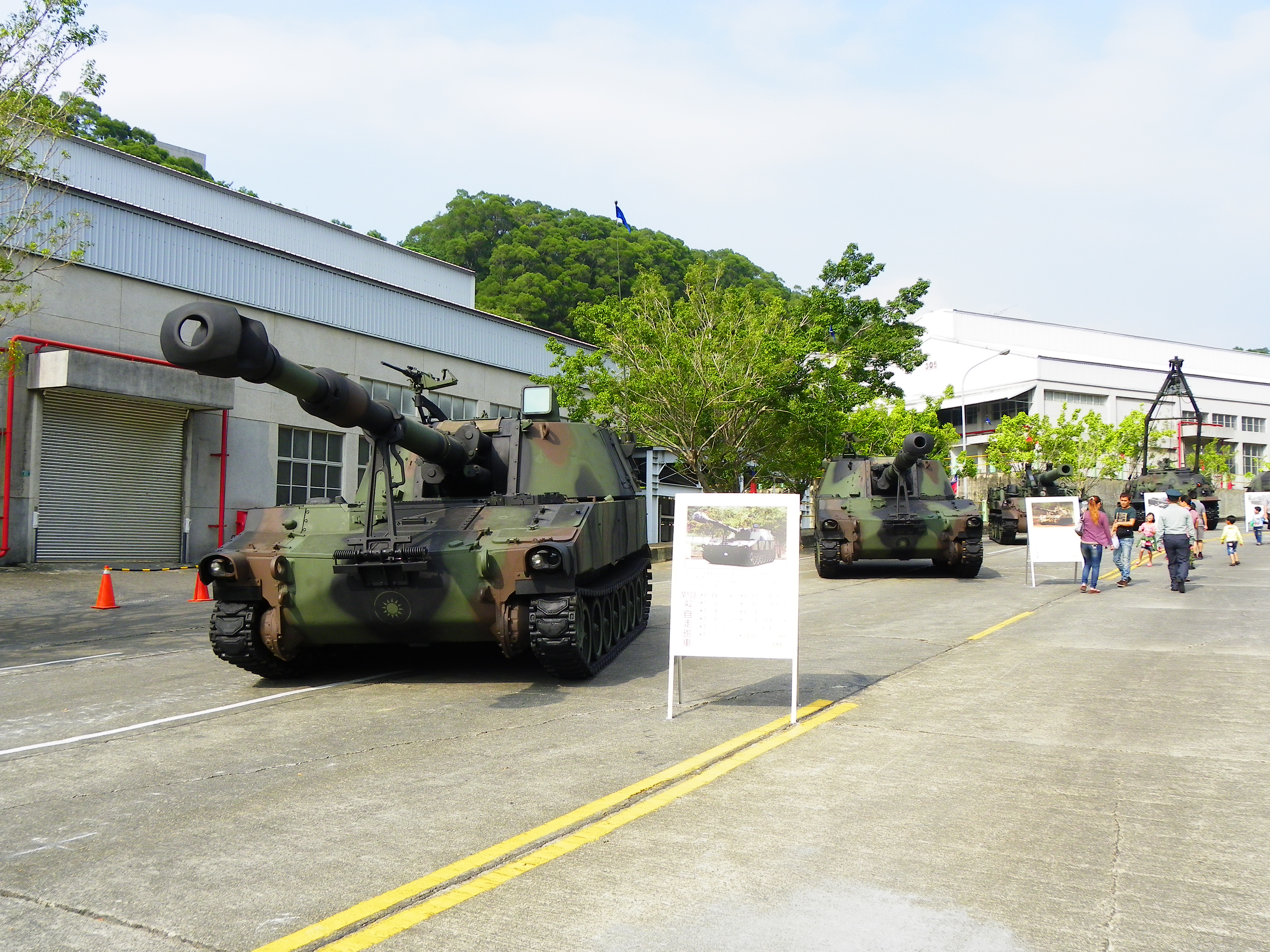
ROCA Self-propelled Howitzers Display at ORDC Yue Kang Road

On September 23, 2019, former Defense Minister Yen De-fa (嚴德發) confirmed the Republic of China Armed Forces has requested the purchase of M109A6 Paladin self-propelled howitzers from the United States. On August 4, 2021, the Biden administration approved a potential $750 million sale of 40 M109A6 self-propelled howitzers and other supporting equipment, including up to 1,698 kits for precision-guided munitions. However, the M109A6 is reportedly delayed until 2026 or later due to crowded production line forcing the Republic of China Armed Forces to look for alternatives. As of March 2023, the Republic of China Armed Forces is reportedly attempting to acquire hundreds of missile trucks and self-propelled howitzers from the Czech Republic.

As of 2019, the ROC Army's current tube artillery in service consists of M109A2 and M109A5 systems, 8 inch M110A2 self-propelled howitzers and 155 mm M114 towed howitzers. These systems have exceeded their service life with the oldest being the M114, which has been in service for 68 years, while the youngest artillery system, the M109A5, has been in service for 21 years. The last artillery system that entered service is the M109A5s, which are ordered in 1996 and taken delivery in 1998.

The ROC Army also maintains a large force of rocket artillery vehicles. There are a handful of Kung Feng VI 117 mm rocket launchers still in service, but these are being phased out in favour of the more capable RT-2000. Testing is underway for long-range rockets capable of being fired by the RT-2000 from Taiwan and reaching inland targets in mainland China. In 2021, Taiwan purchased 11 M142 High Mobility Artillery Rocket Systems (HIMARS) from the U.S. to be delivered in 2024, along with the first batch of M1A2T Abrams tanks. A second order of 18 HIMARS is expected to be delivered in 2026.

=== Gallery ===
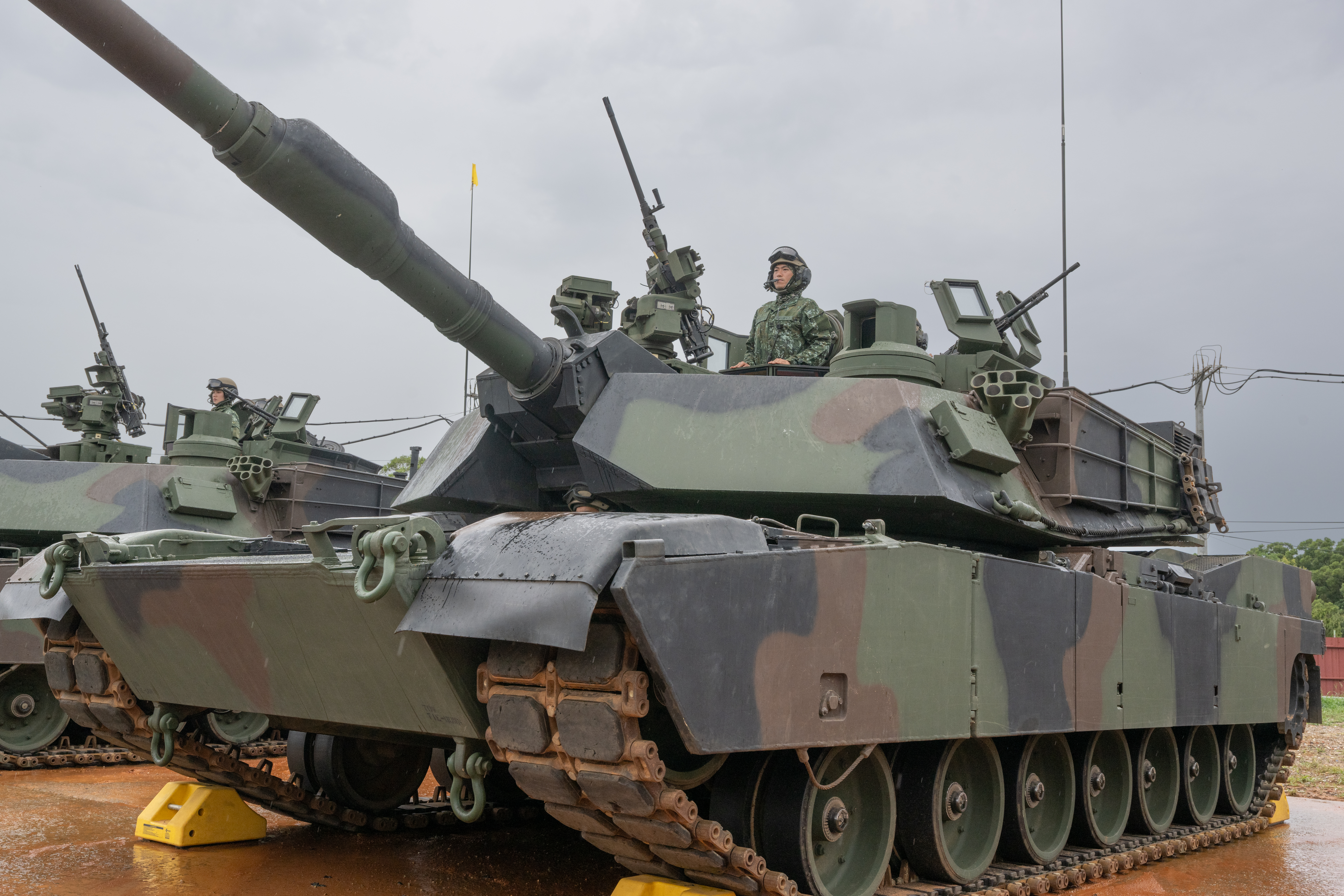
M1A2T tanks

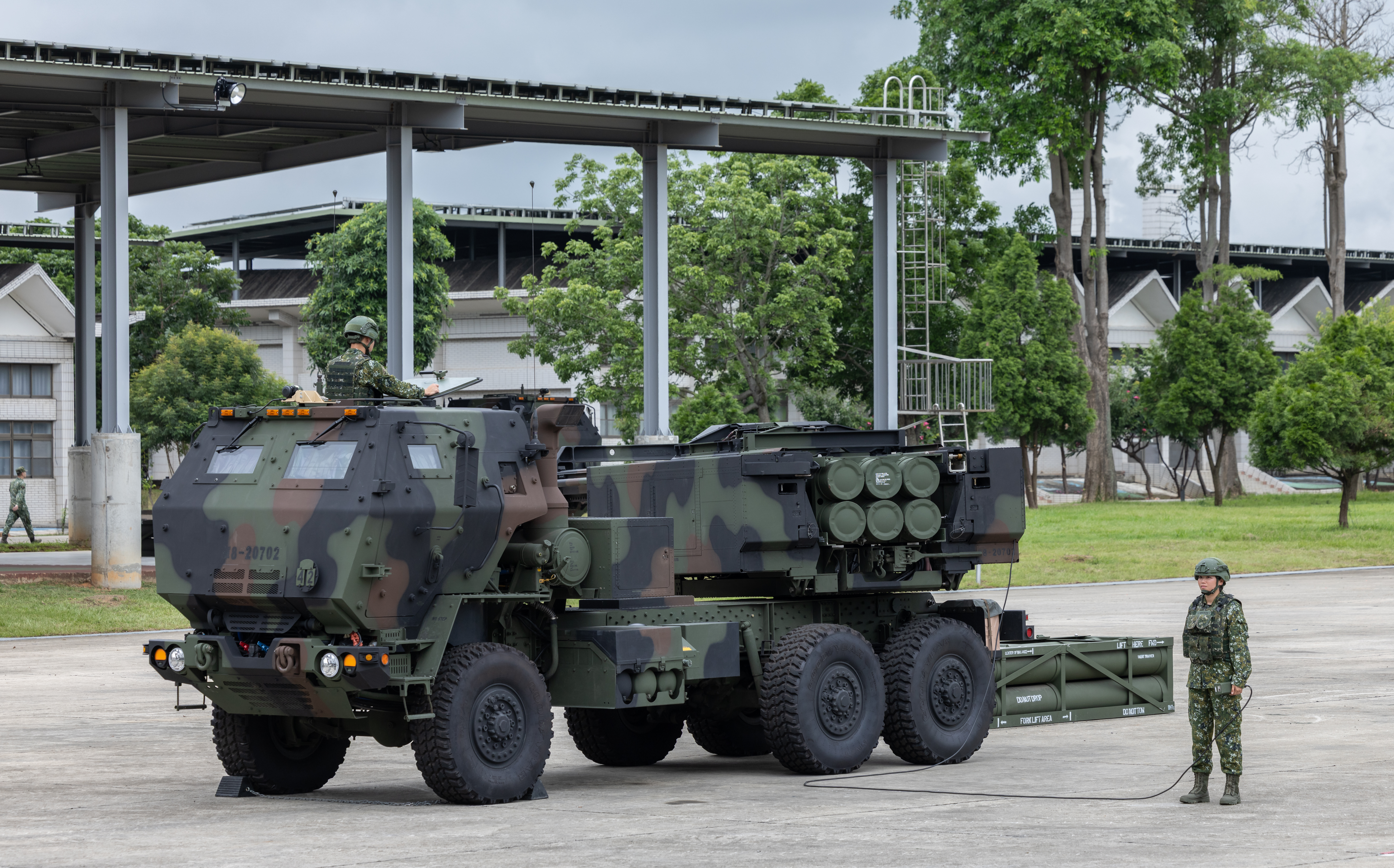
M142 HIMARS

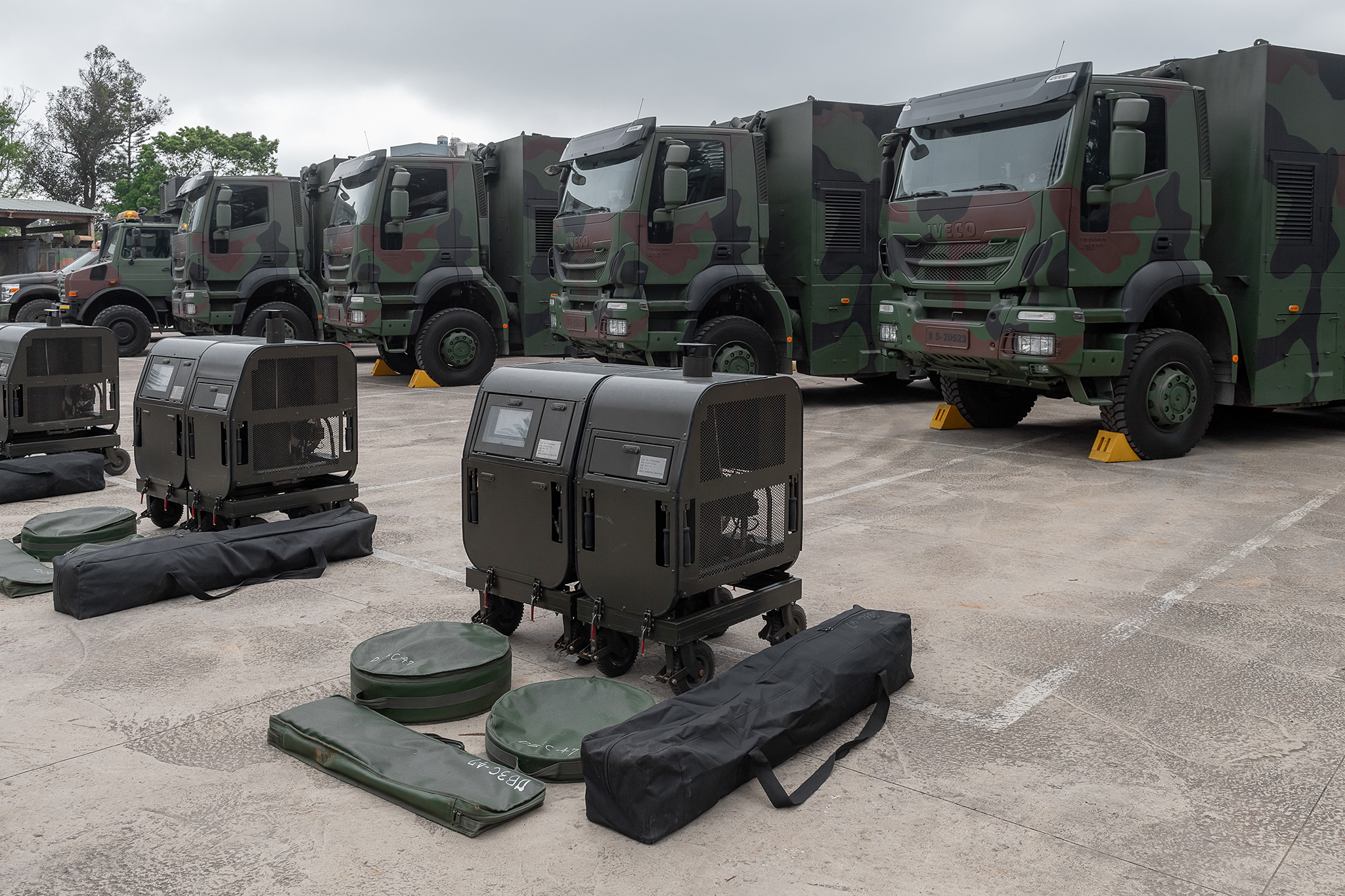
MD-105 Heavy Decontamination Truck

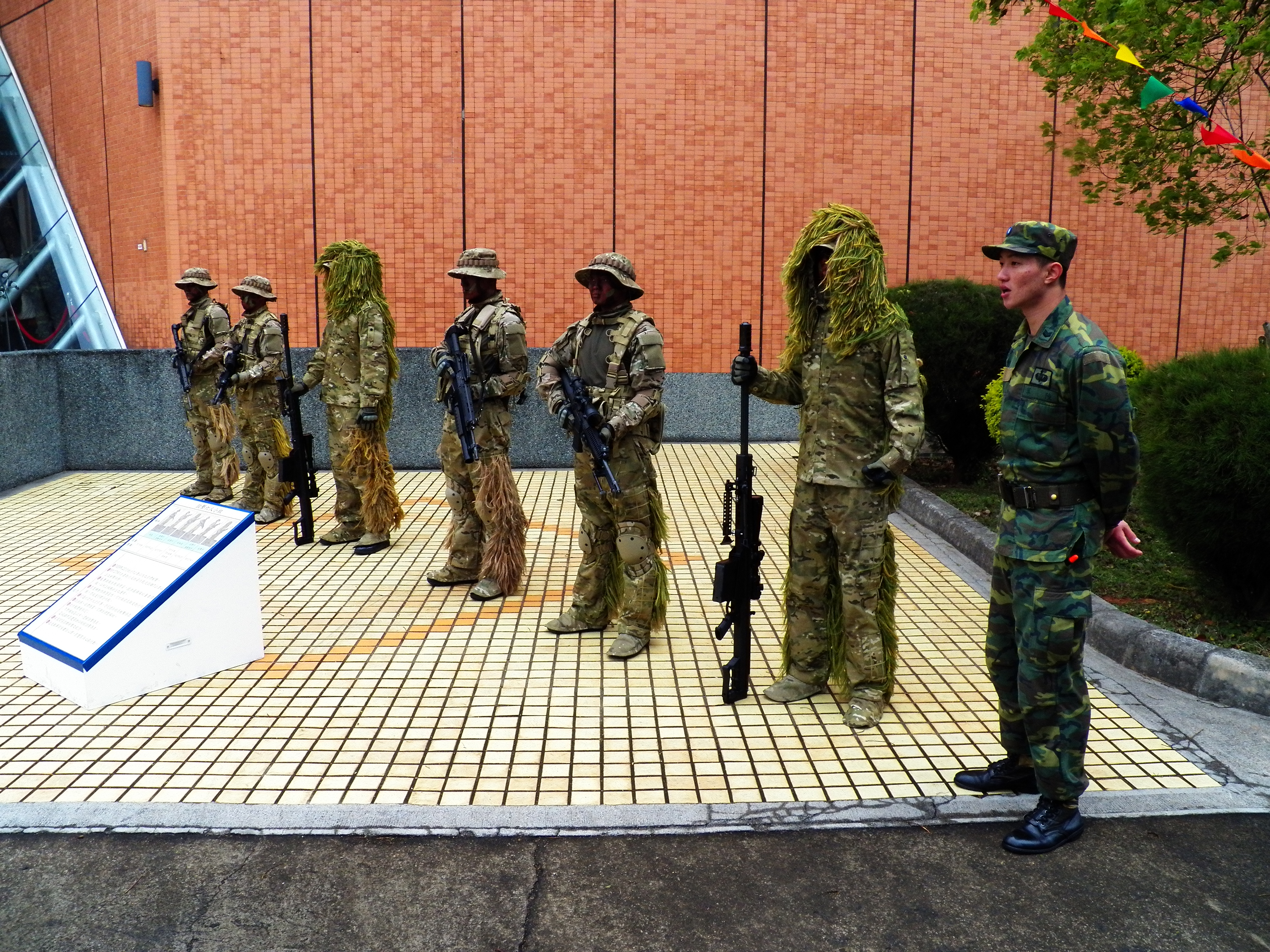
ROC Army sharpshooter team

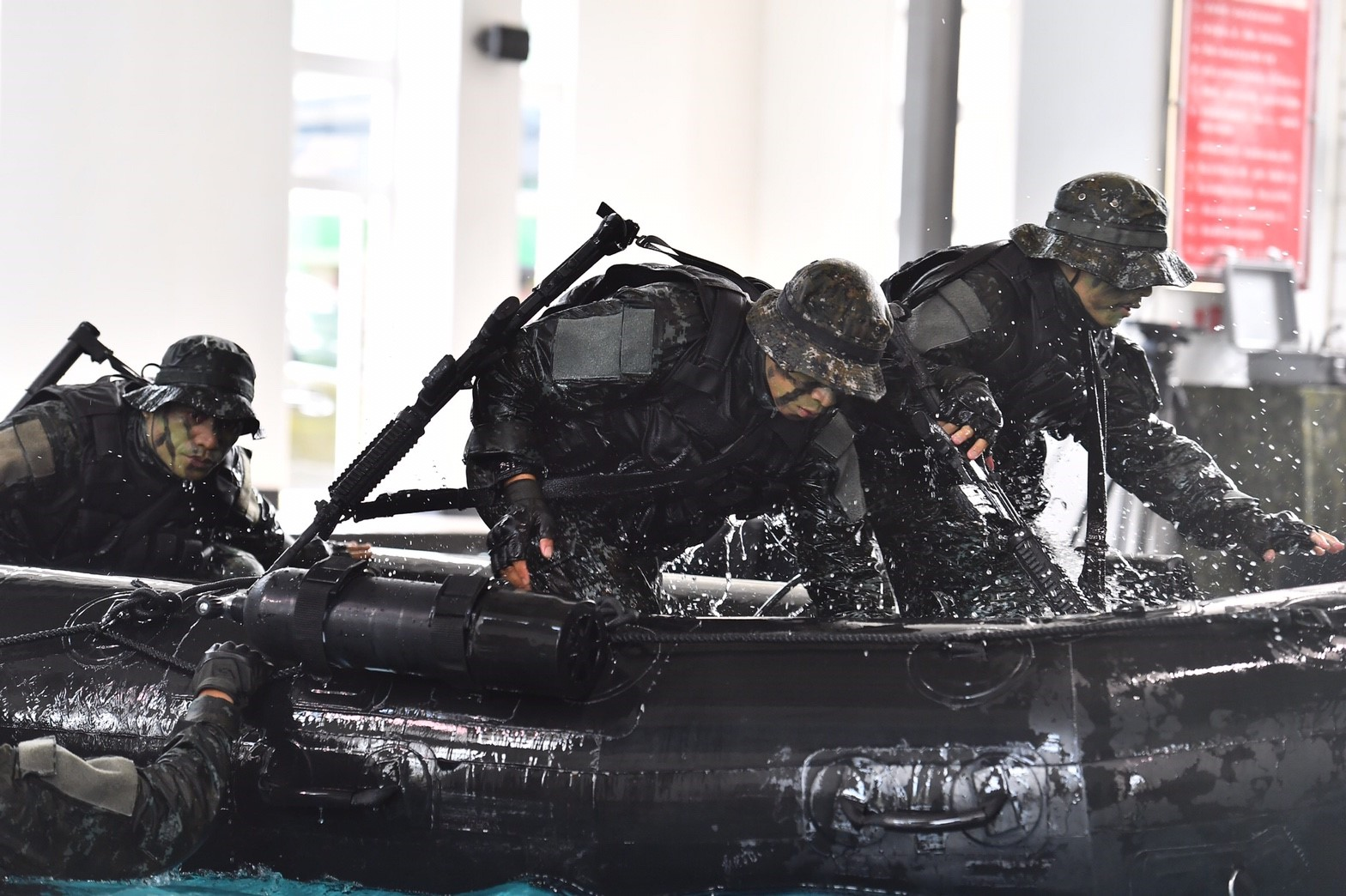
ROC Army 101st Amphibious Reconnaissance Battalion Training during Amphibious Landing Exercise

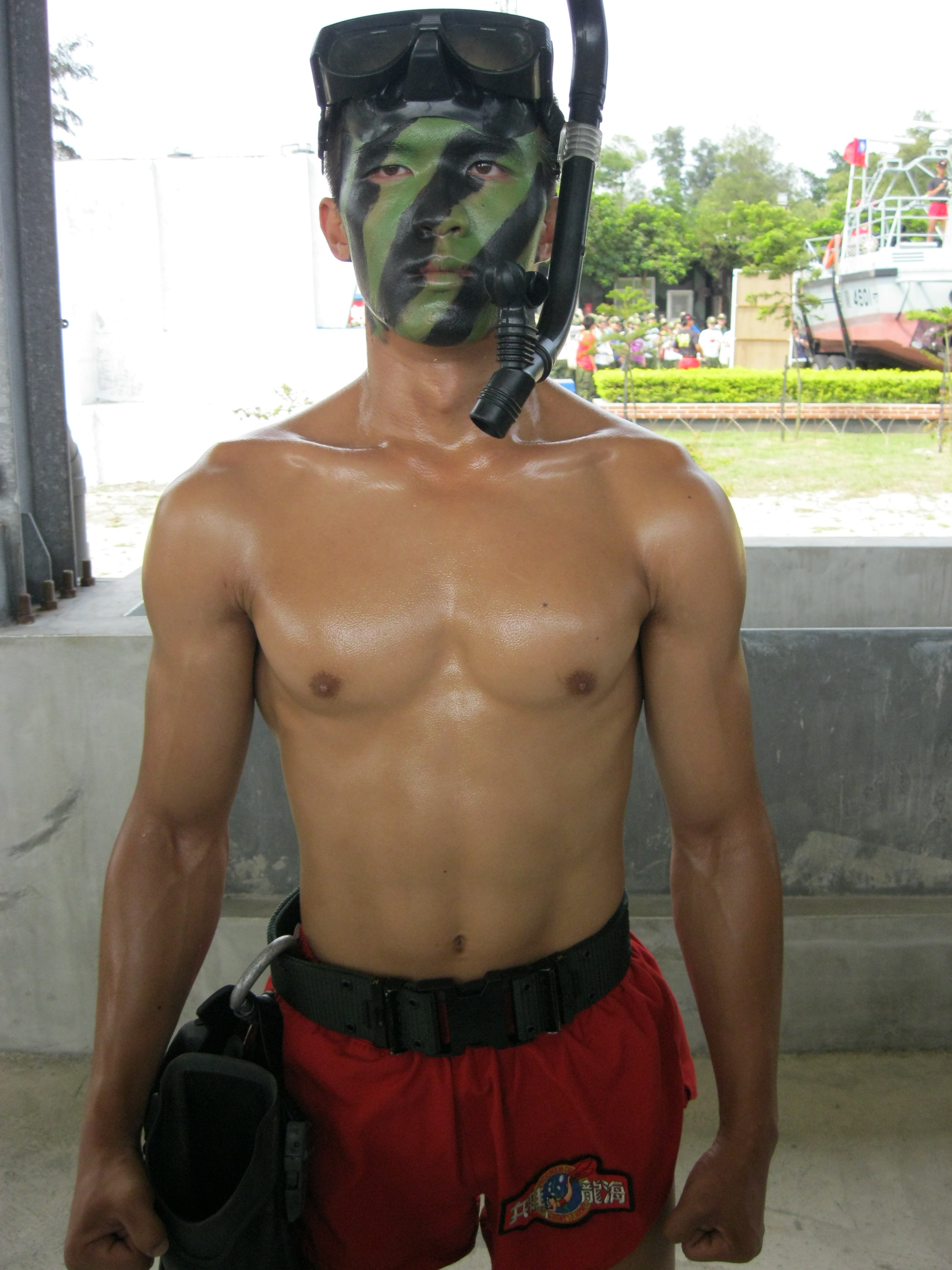
A military frogman of the 101st Amphibious Reconnaissance Battalion

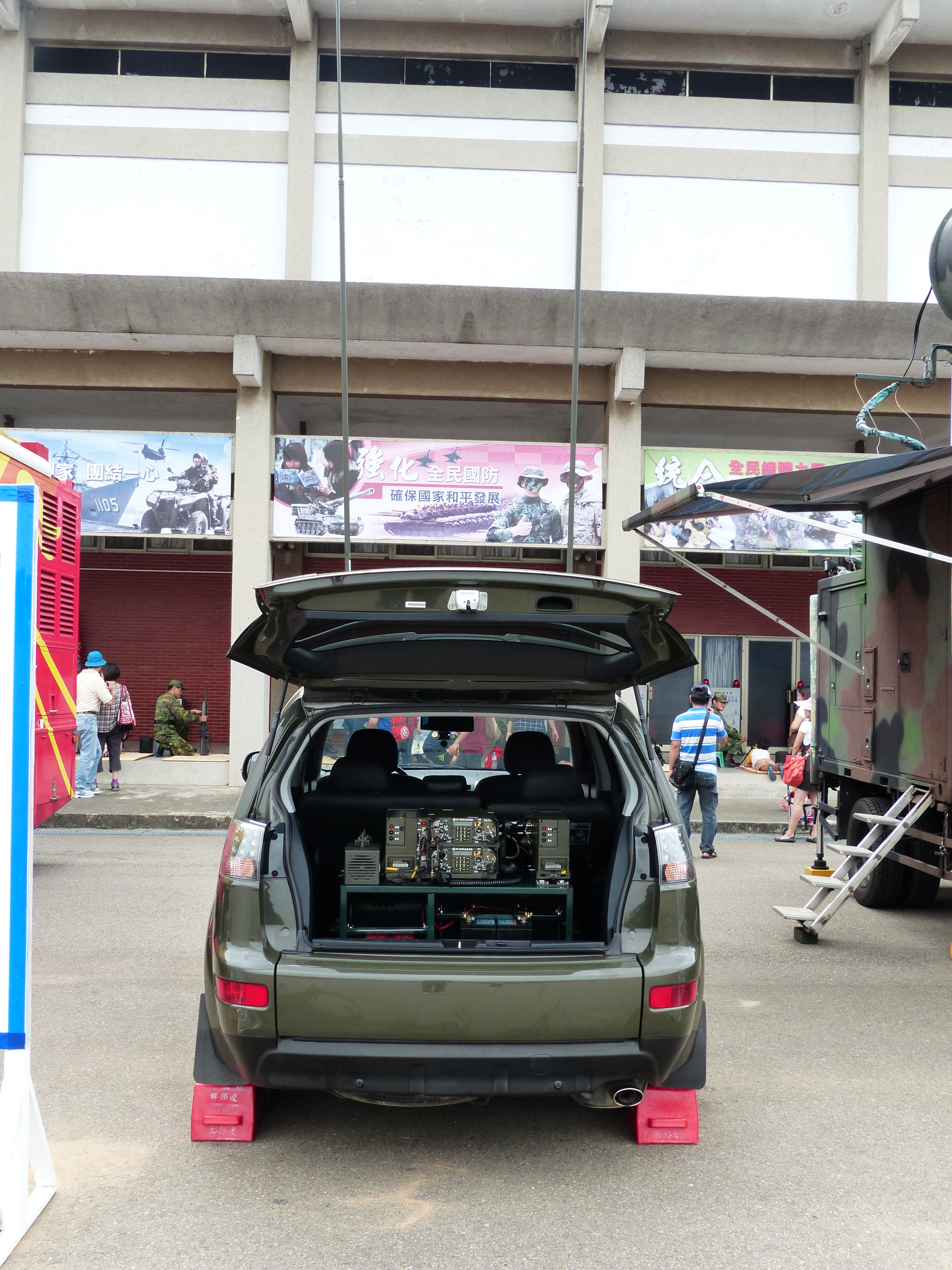
ROCA Emergency Command Car

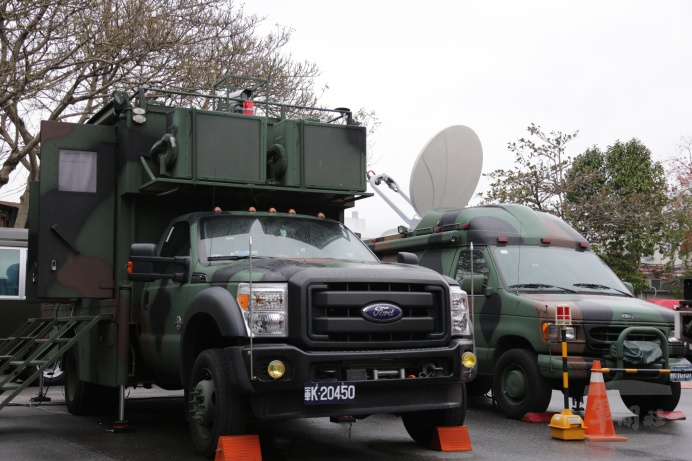
ROCA Microwave Broadcasting Vehicle (Ford F250 chassis)

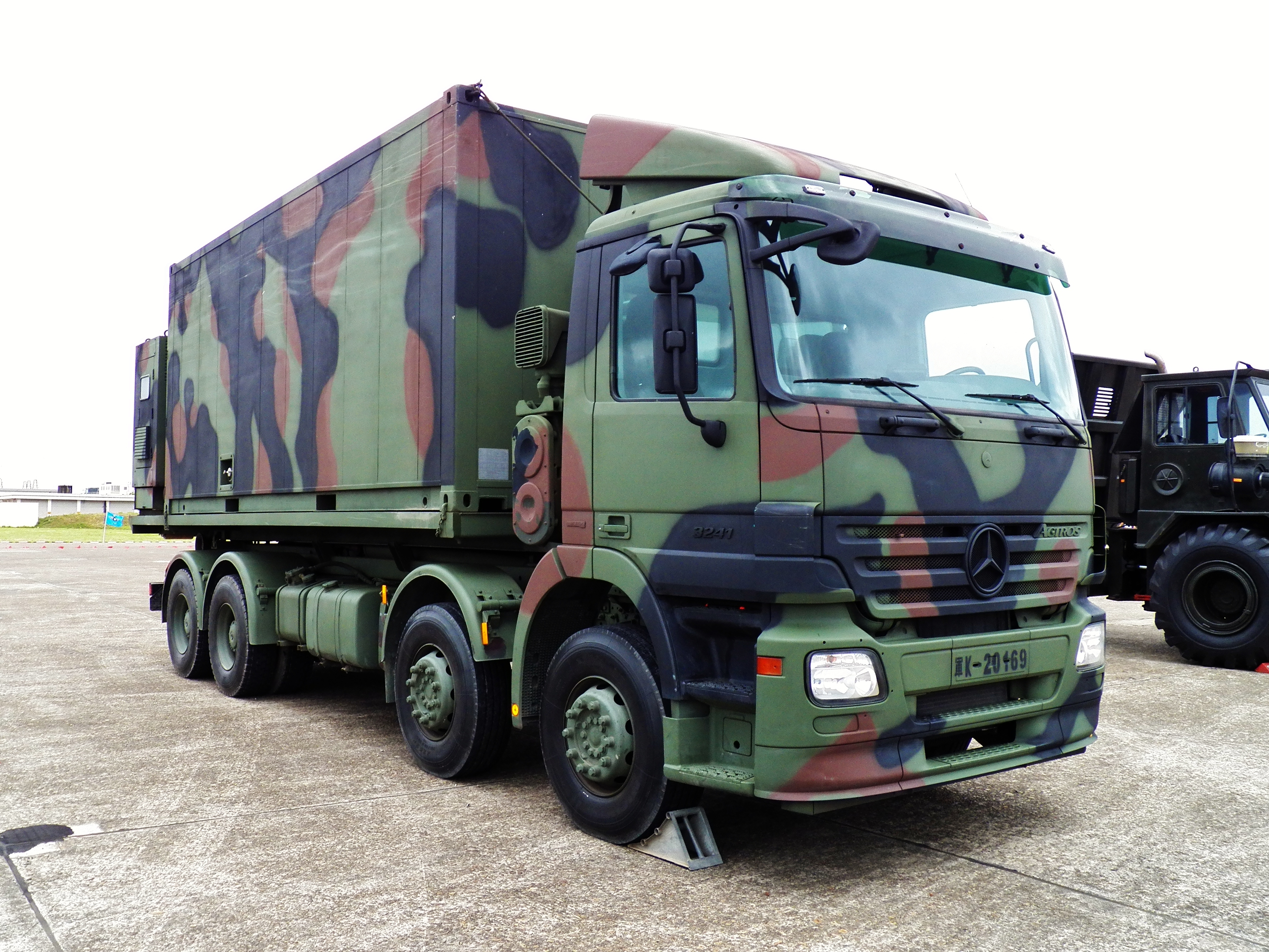
ROCA Mobile Water Filter Truck (Mercedes-Benz Actros chassis)

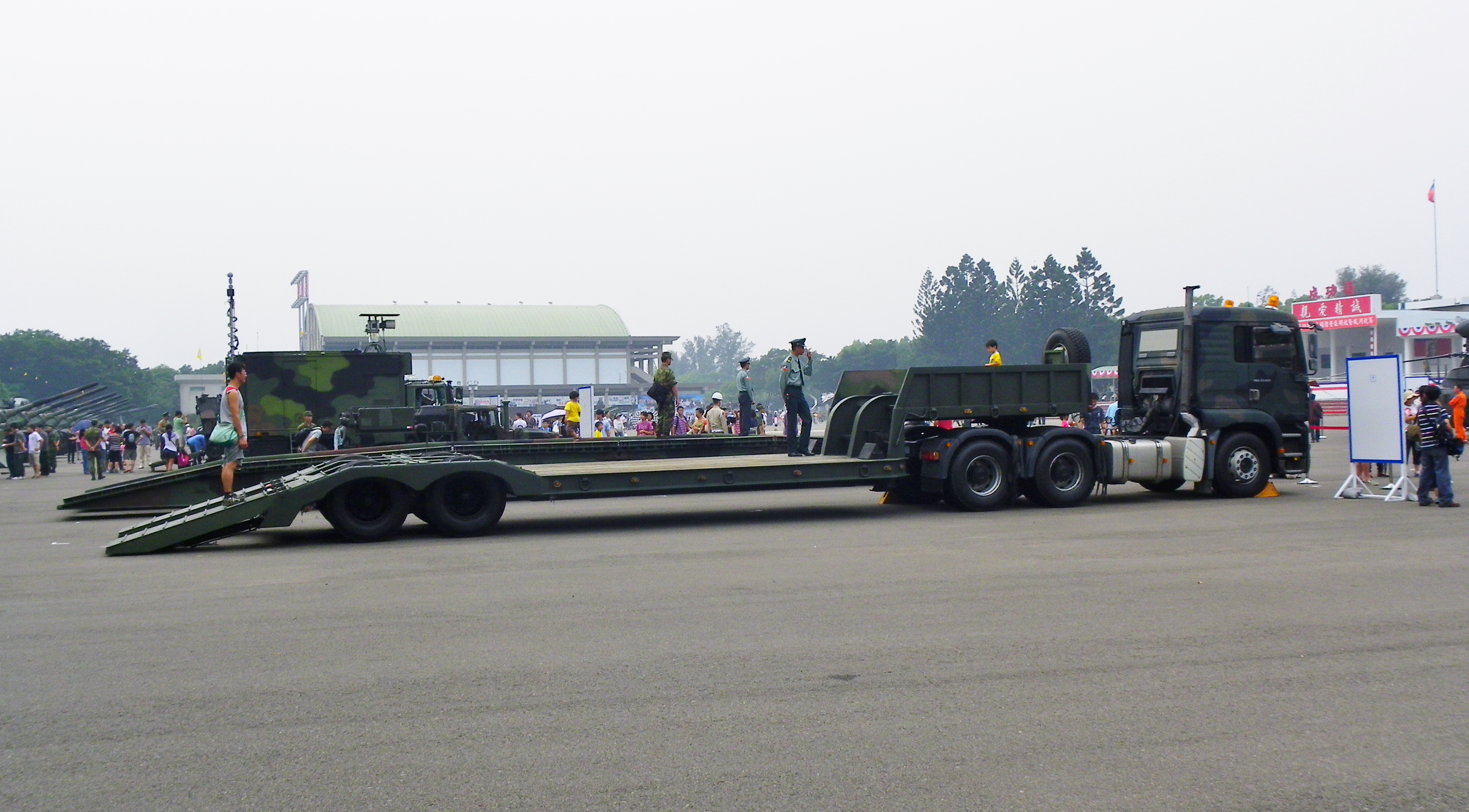
MAN 35ton Heavy Transporter

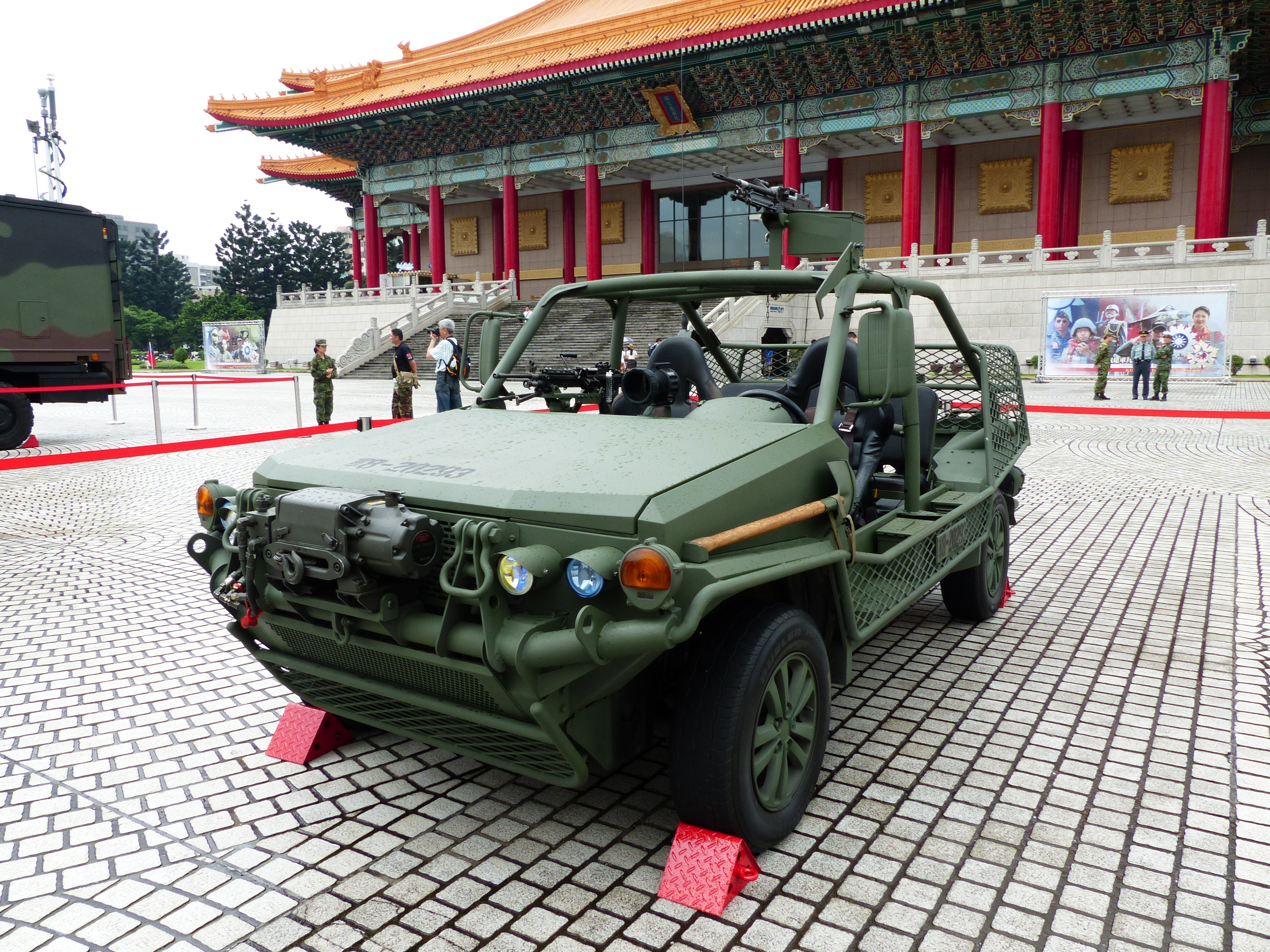
ROCA Special Assault Vehicle

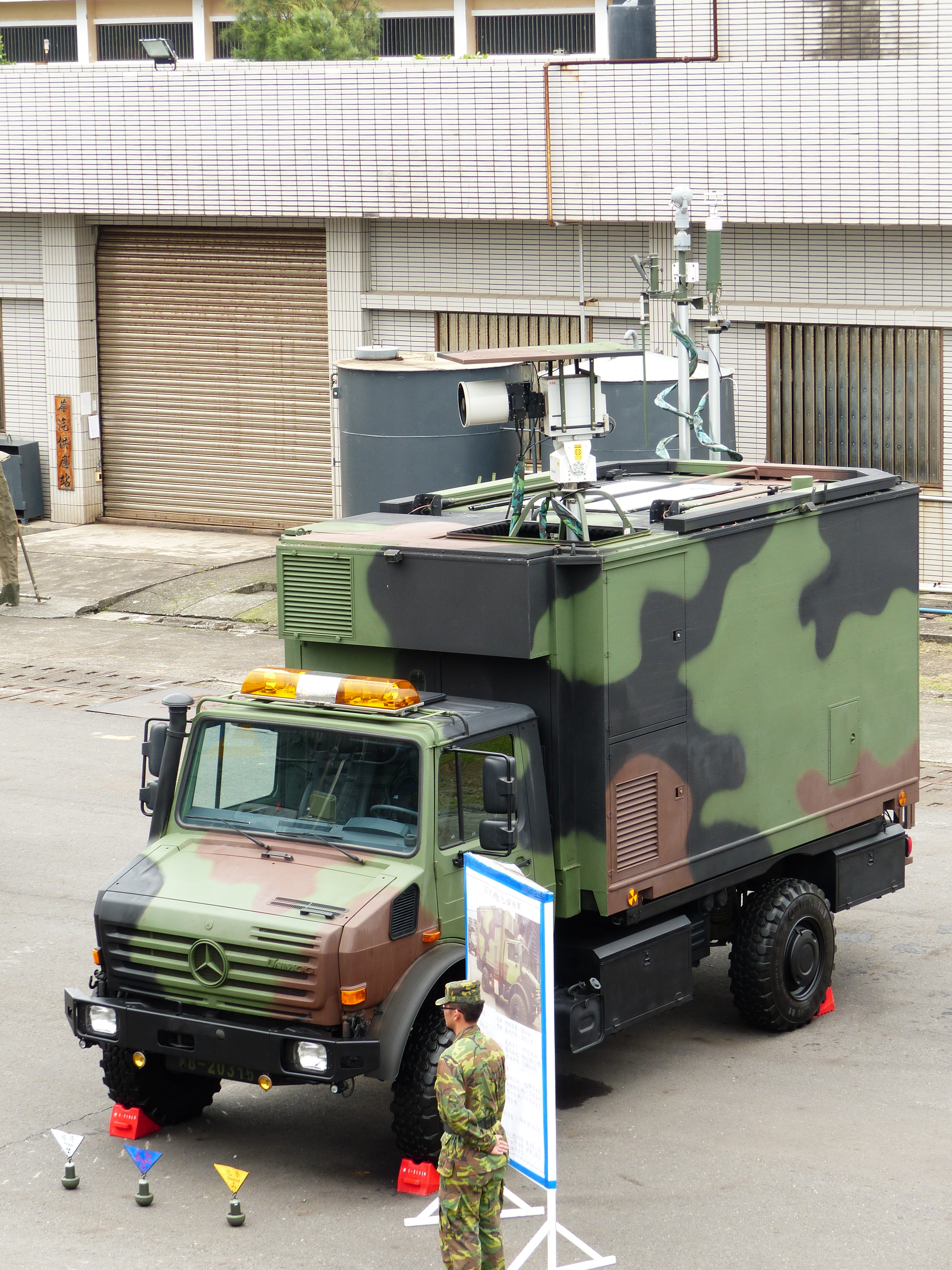
ROCA Type 97 NBC Detection (Daimler Truck Unimog) Truck

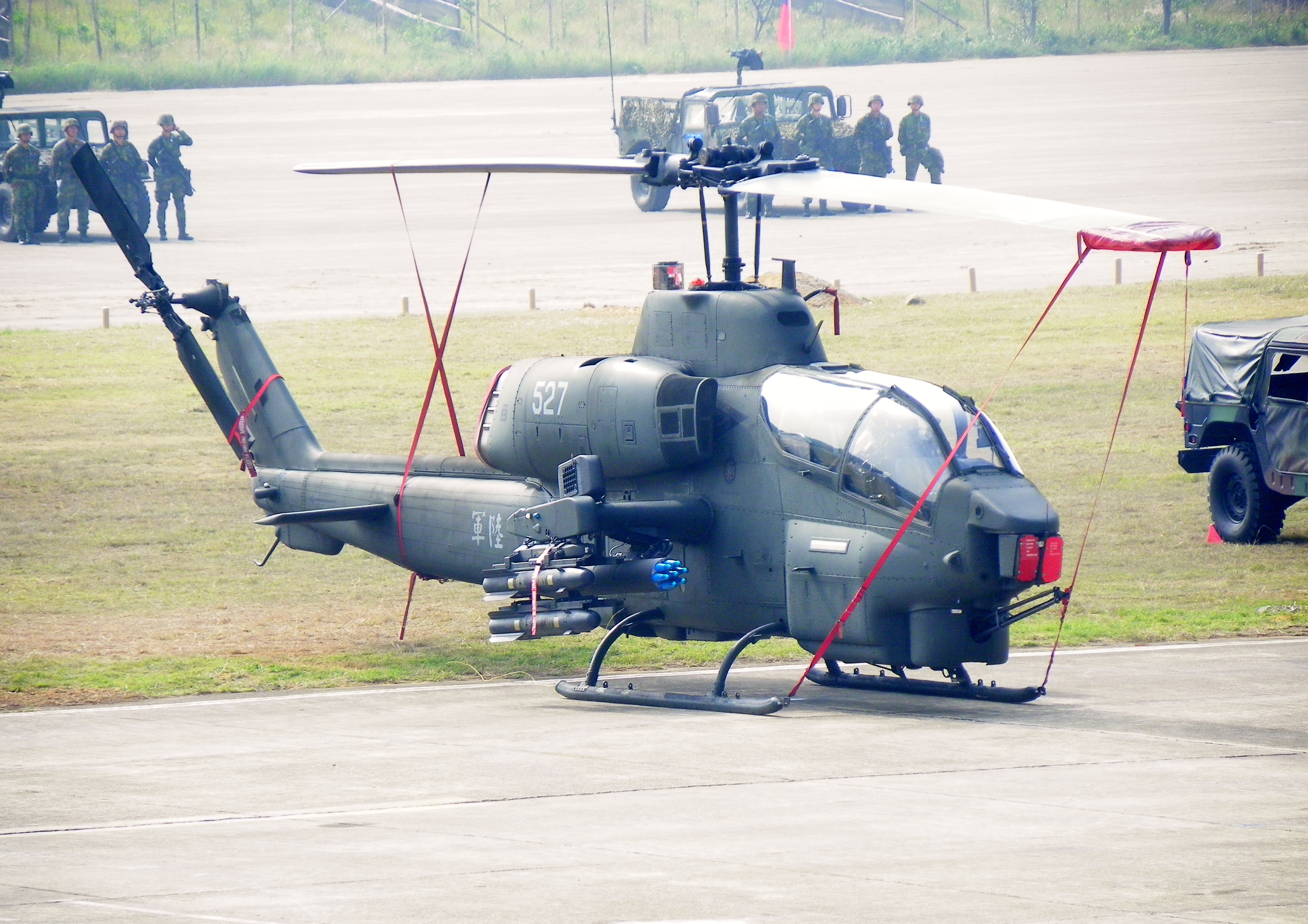
ROCA AH-1W

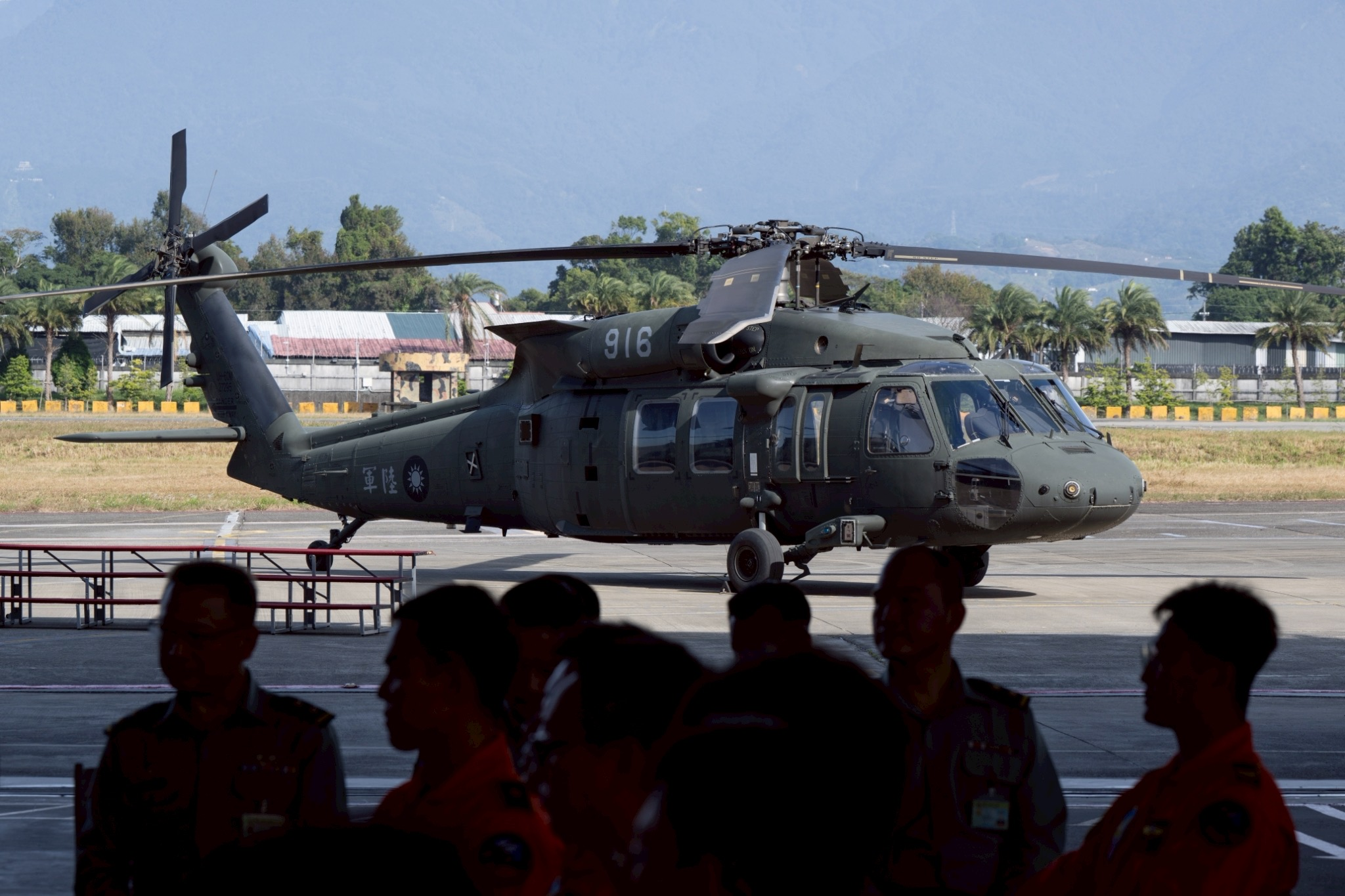
An ROCA UH-60M

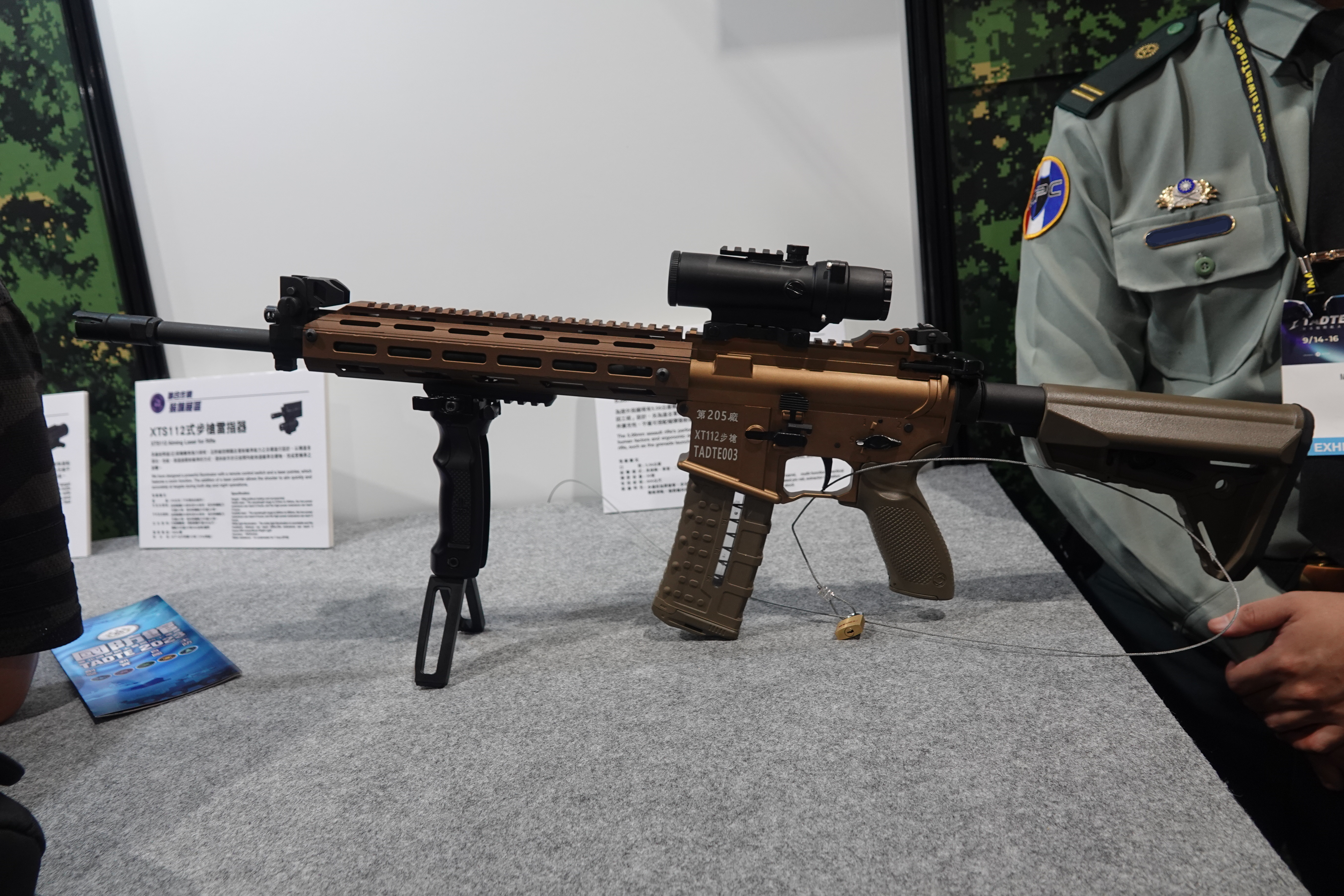
T112 Rifle

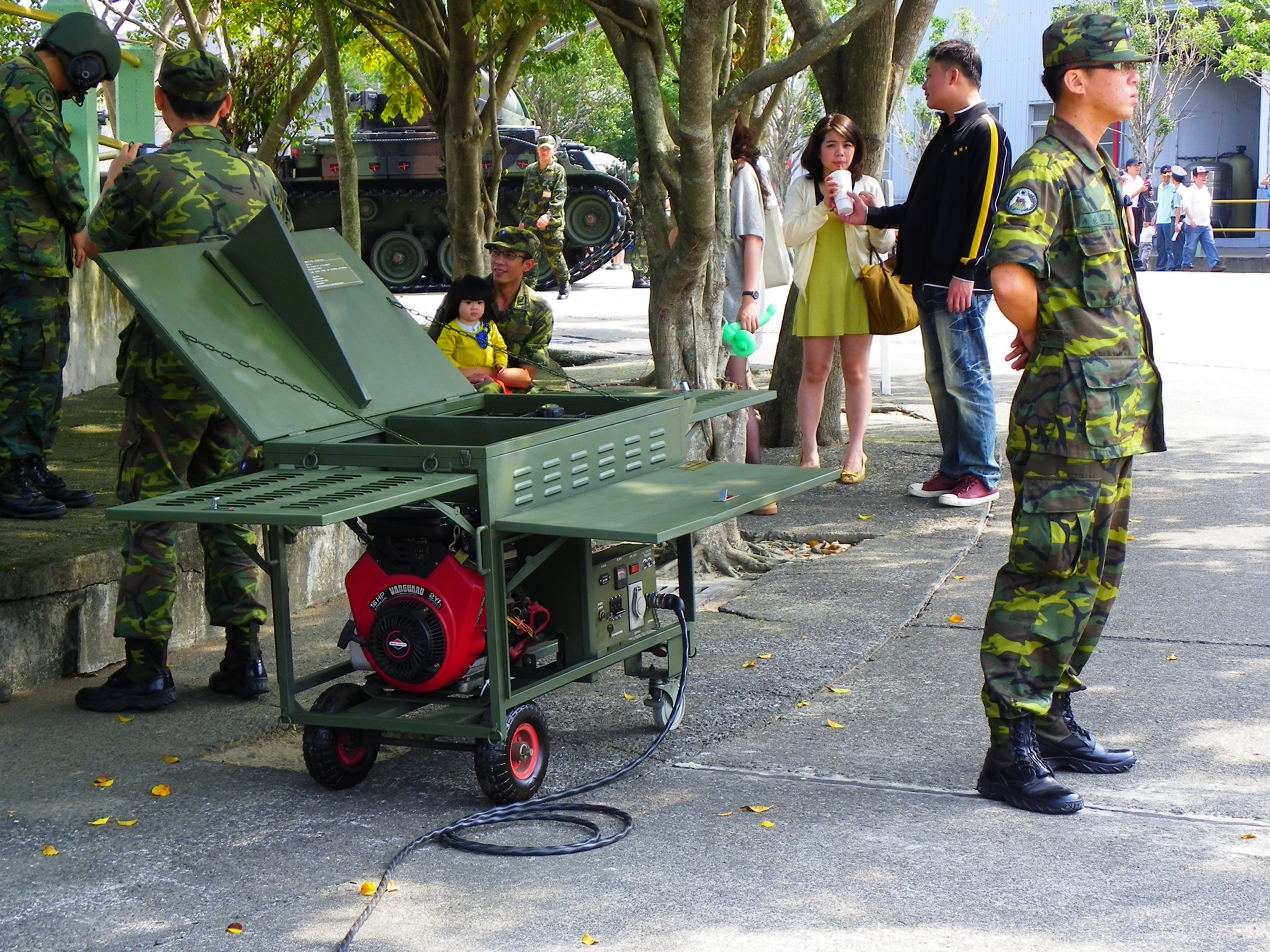
Generator of T-82 20 mm Twin Cannon

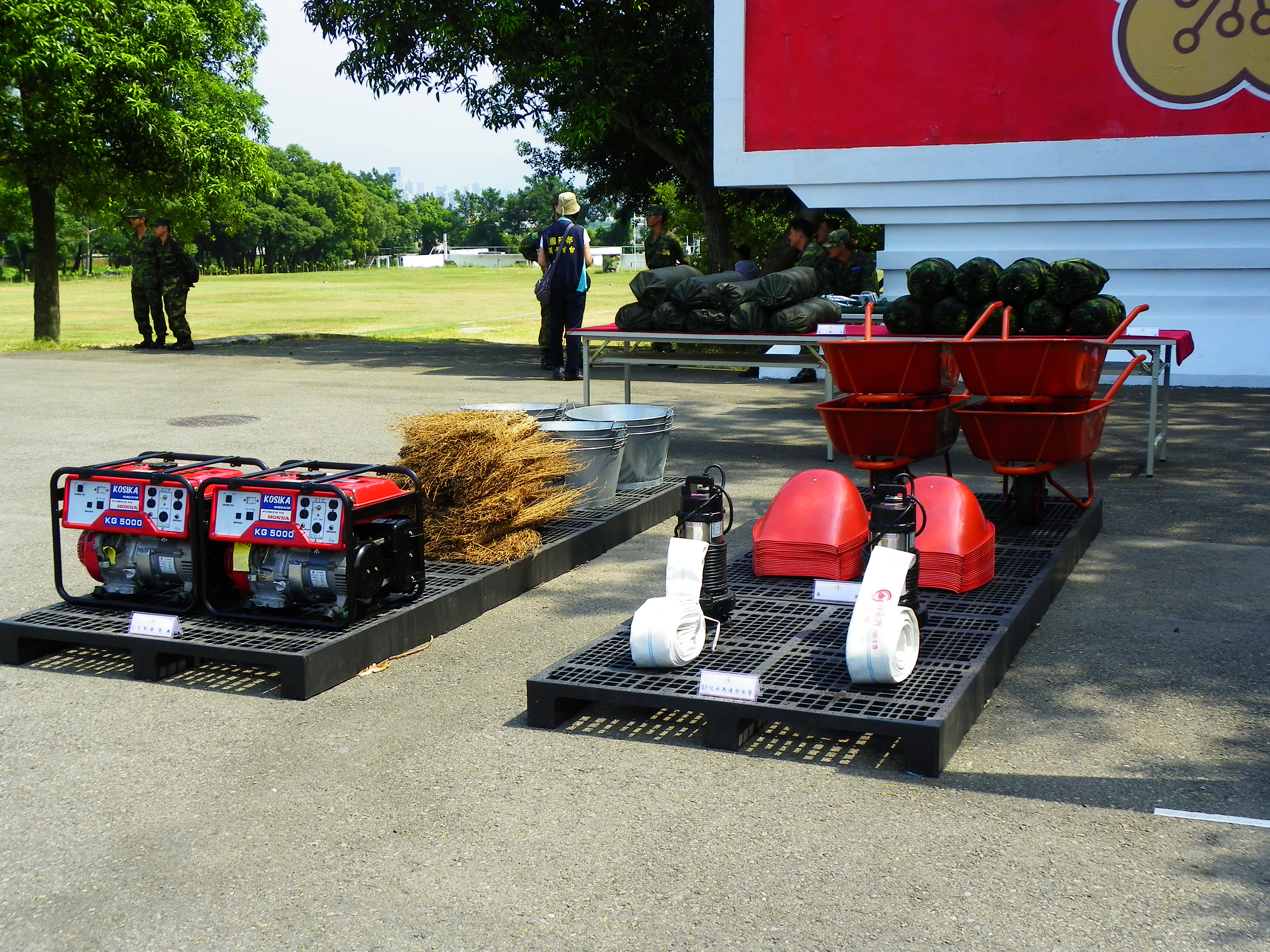
Engineering Equitment of Center Taiwan Reserve Training Center

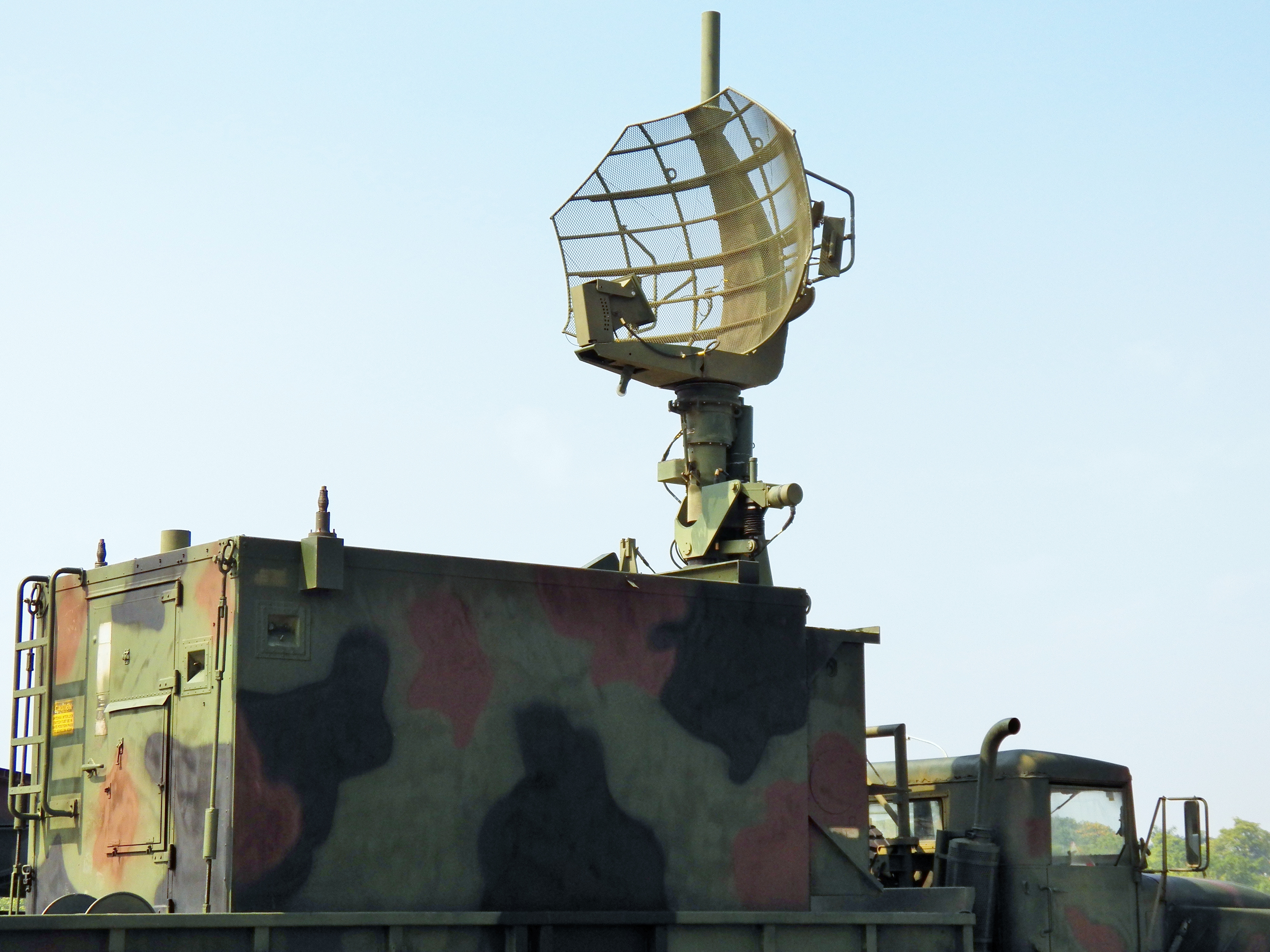
LAADS Housed in S-280 Shelter on Truck

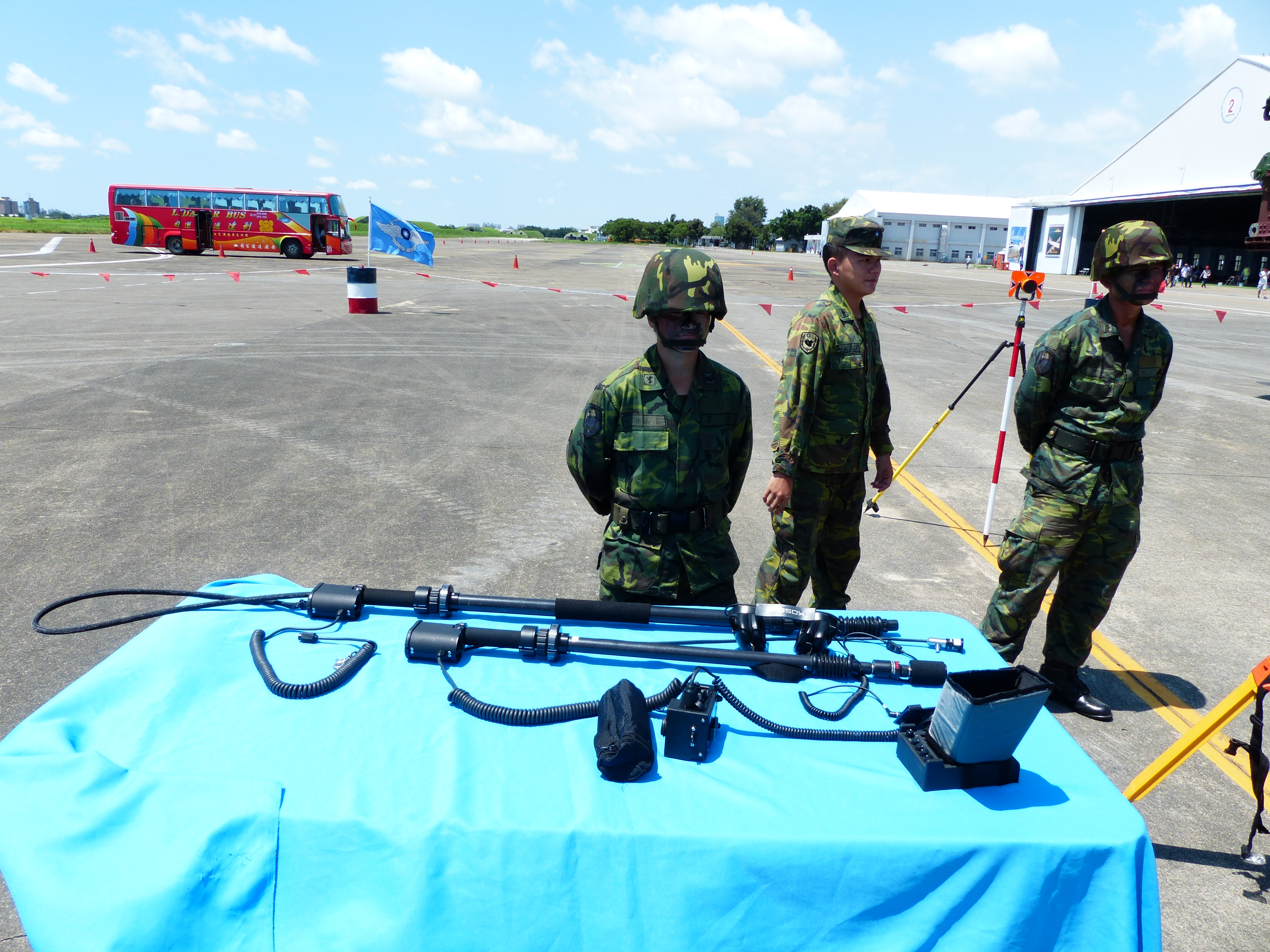
ROCA Double-modes Infrared Biological Detector

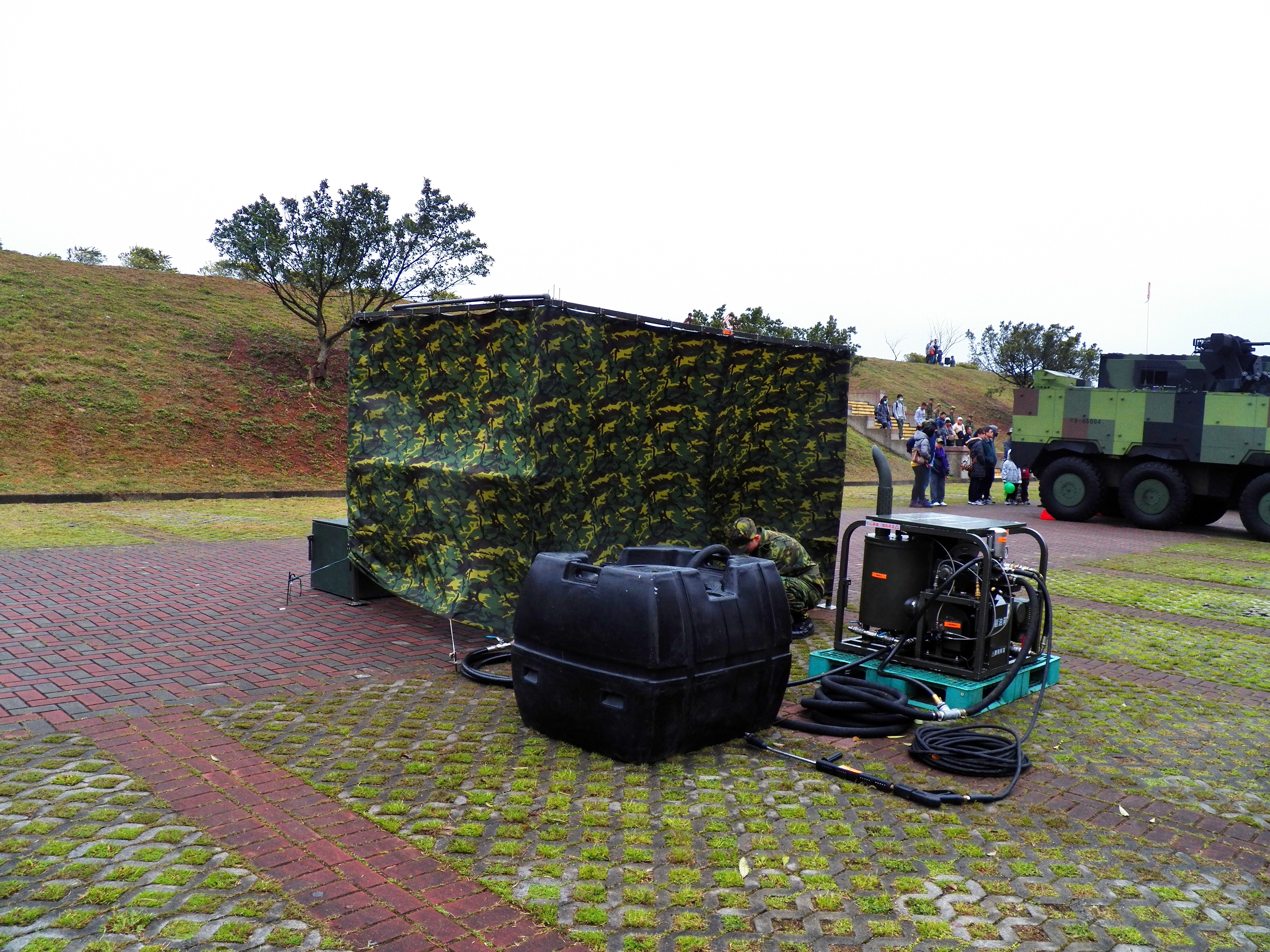
T4-86 Light Sterilizer with Bath Screen

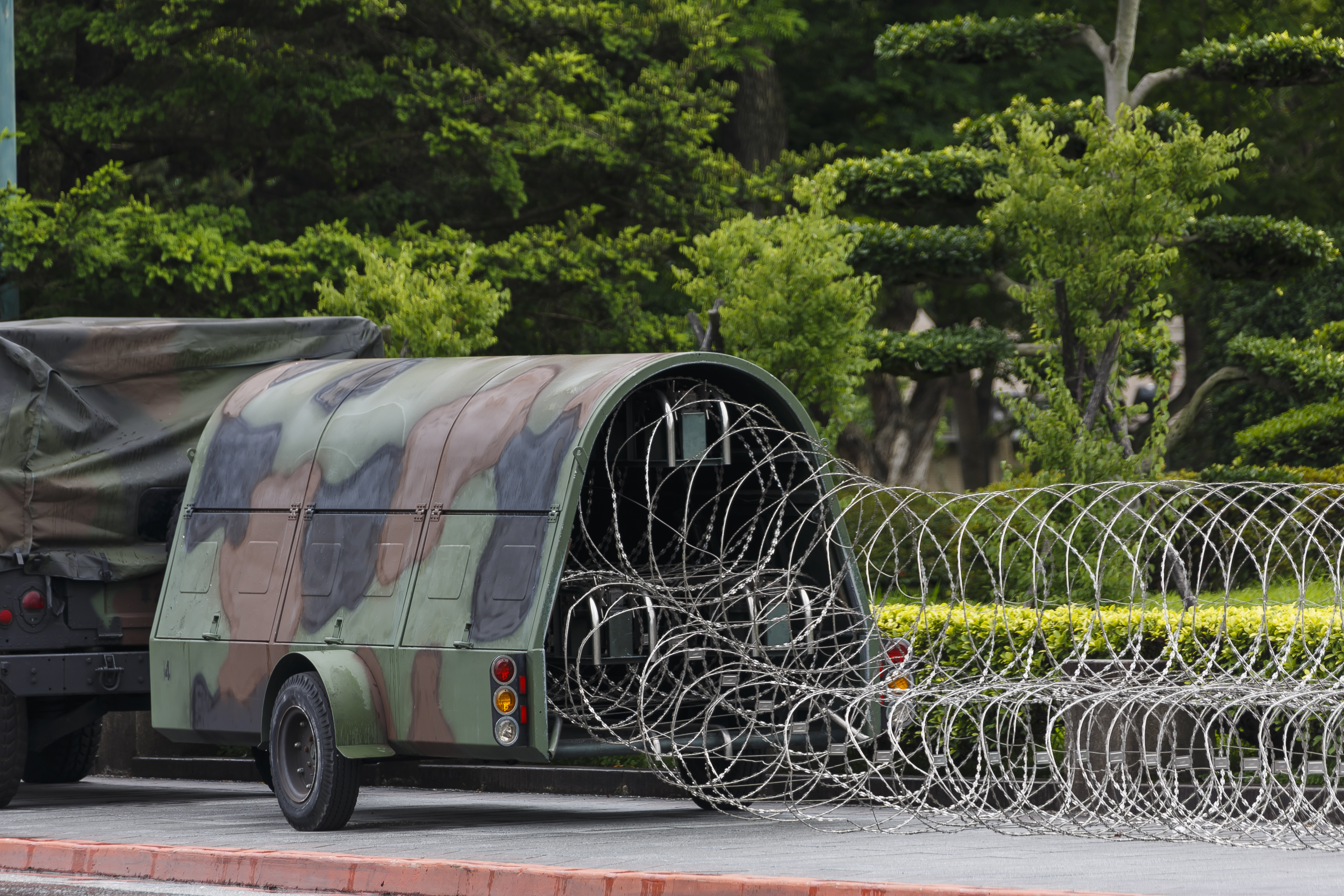
Wire dispenser

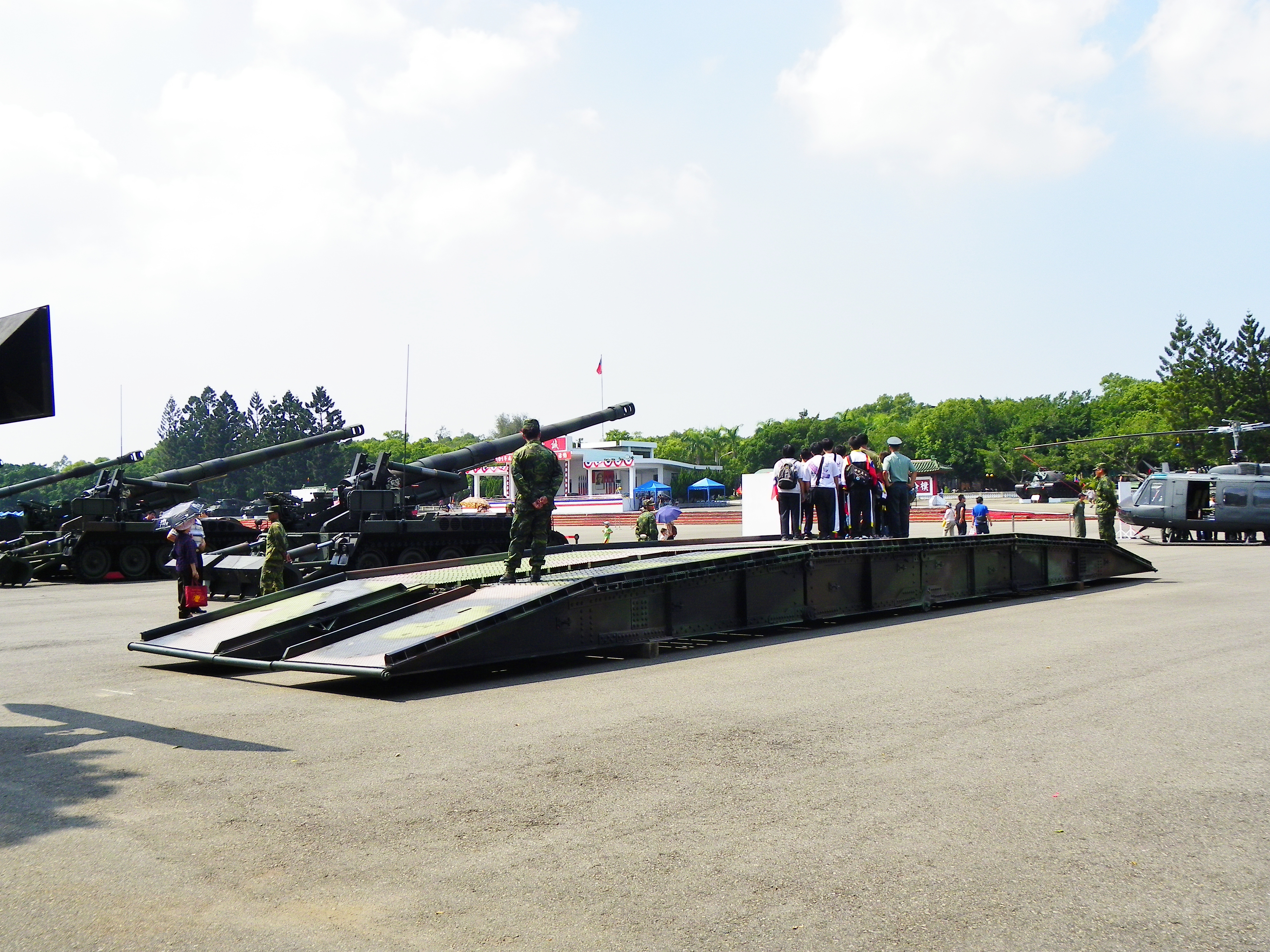
Visitors with ROCA Officer Photoing above Engineering Bridge

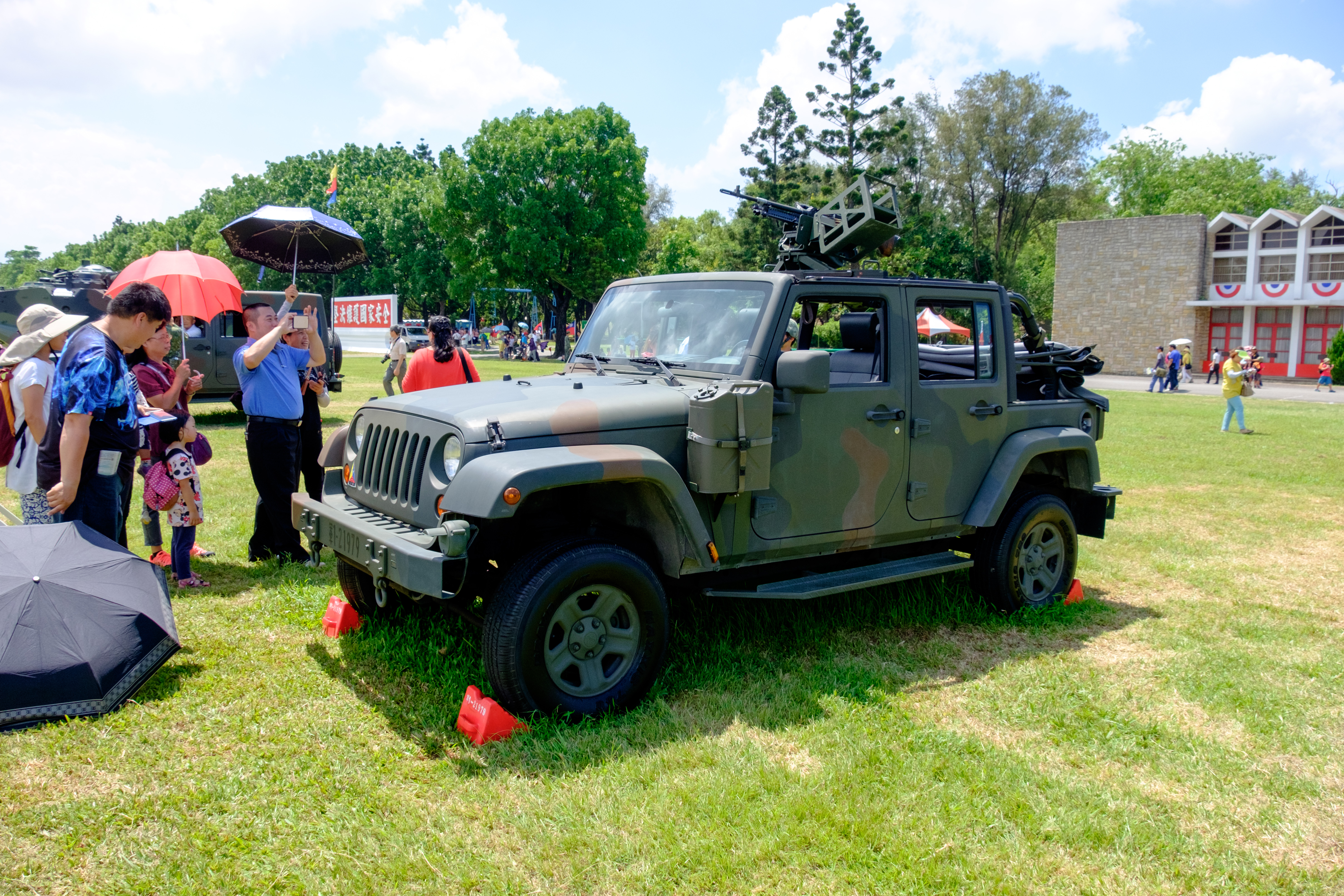
Military Light Tactical Vehicle Type B

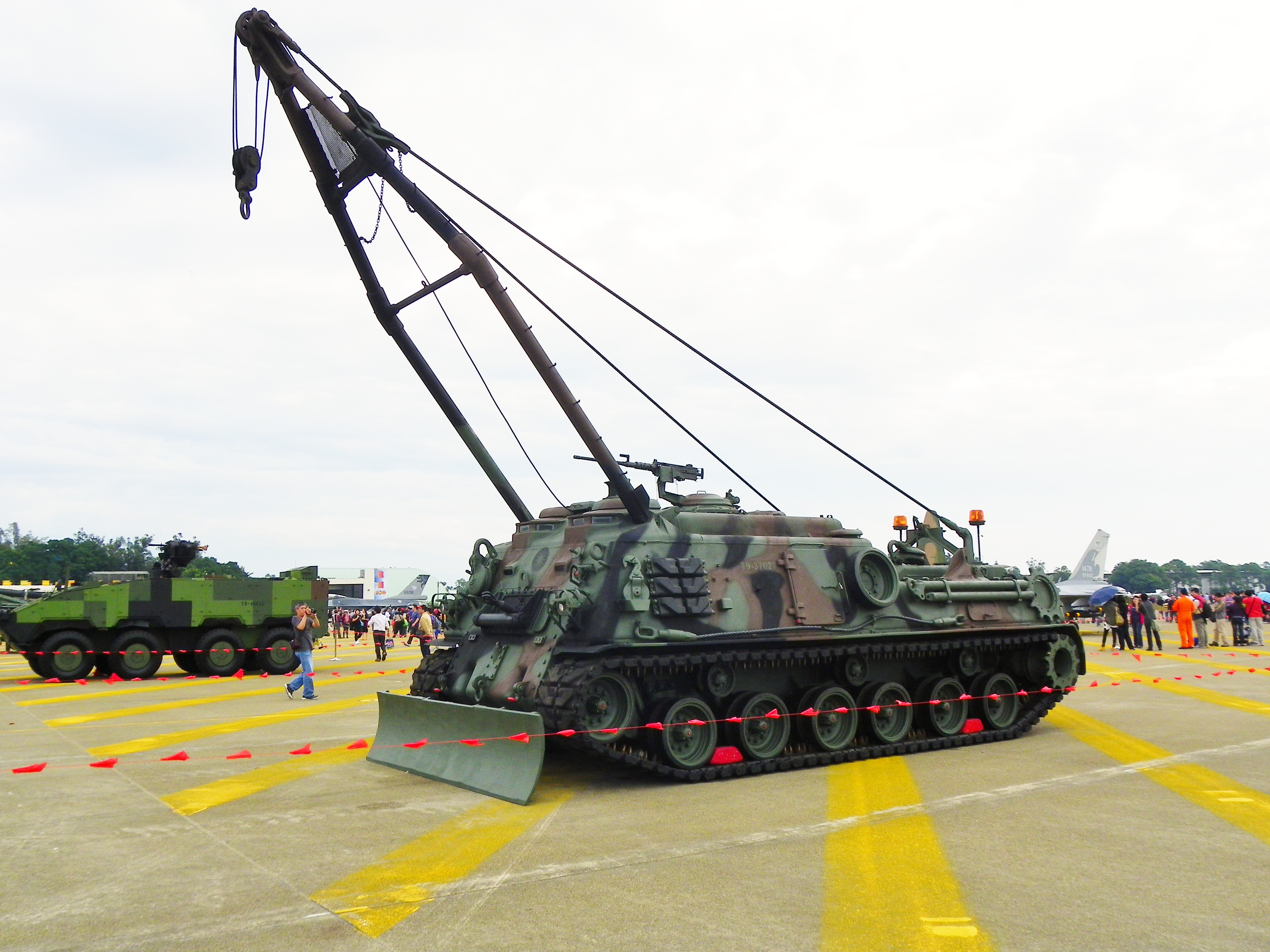
ROCA M88A1 RV

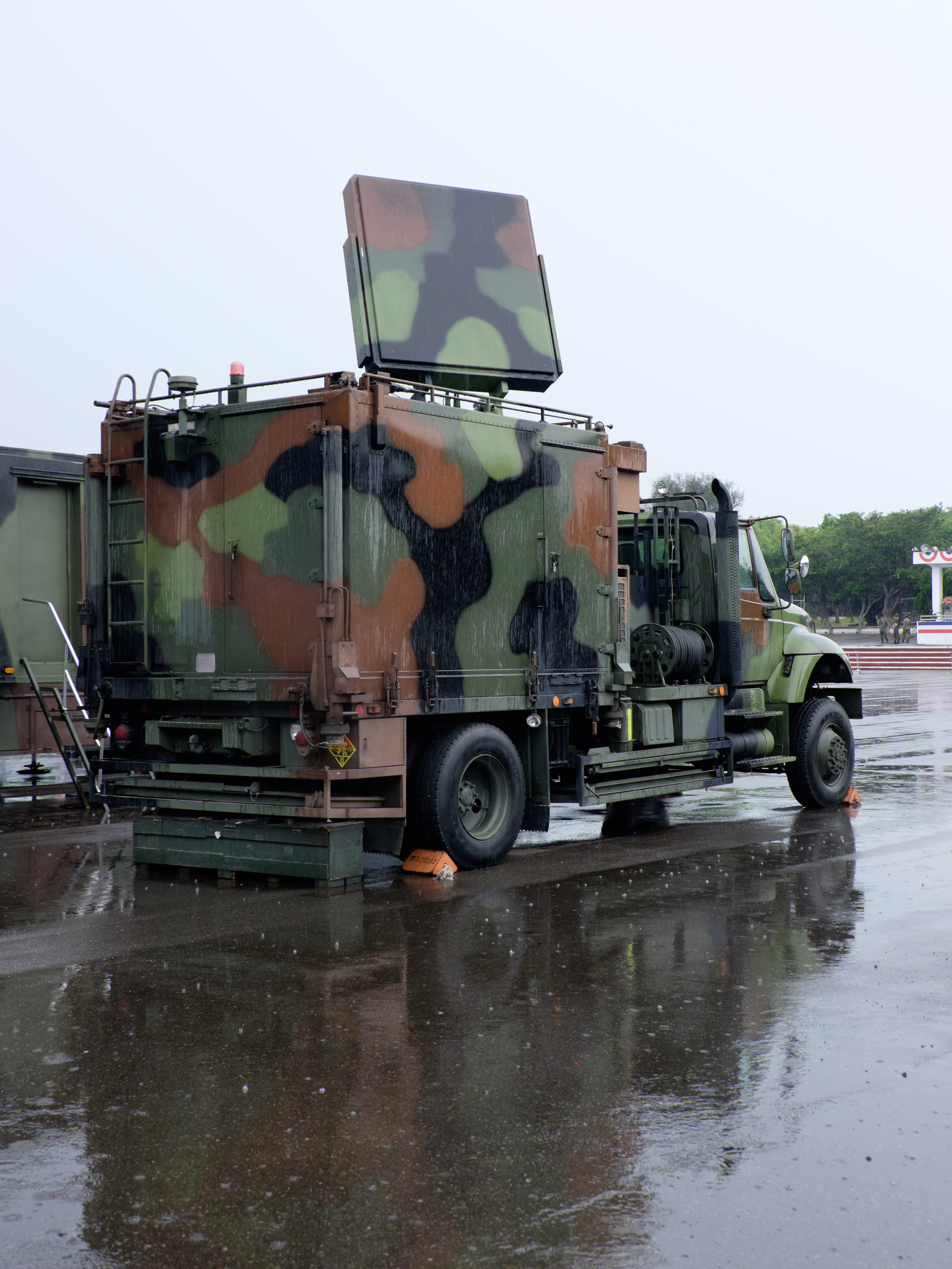
CS/MPQ-90 on a Navistar 7000 series truck

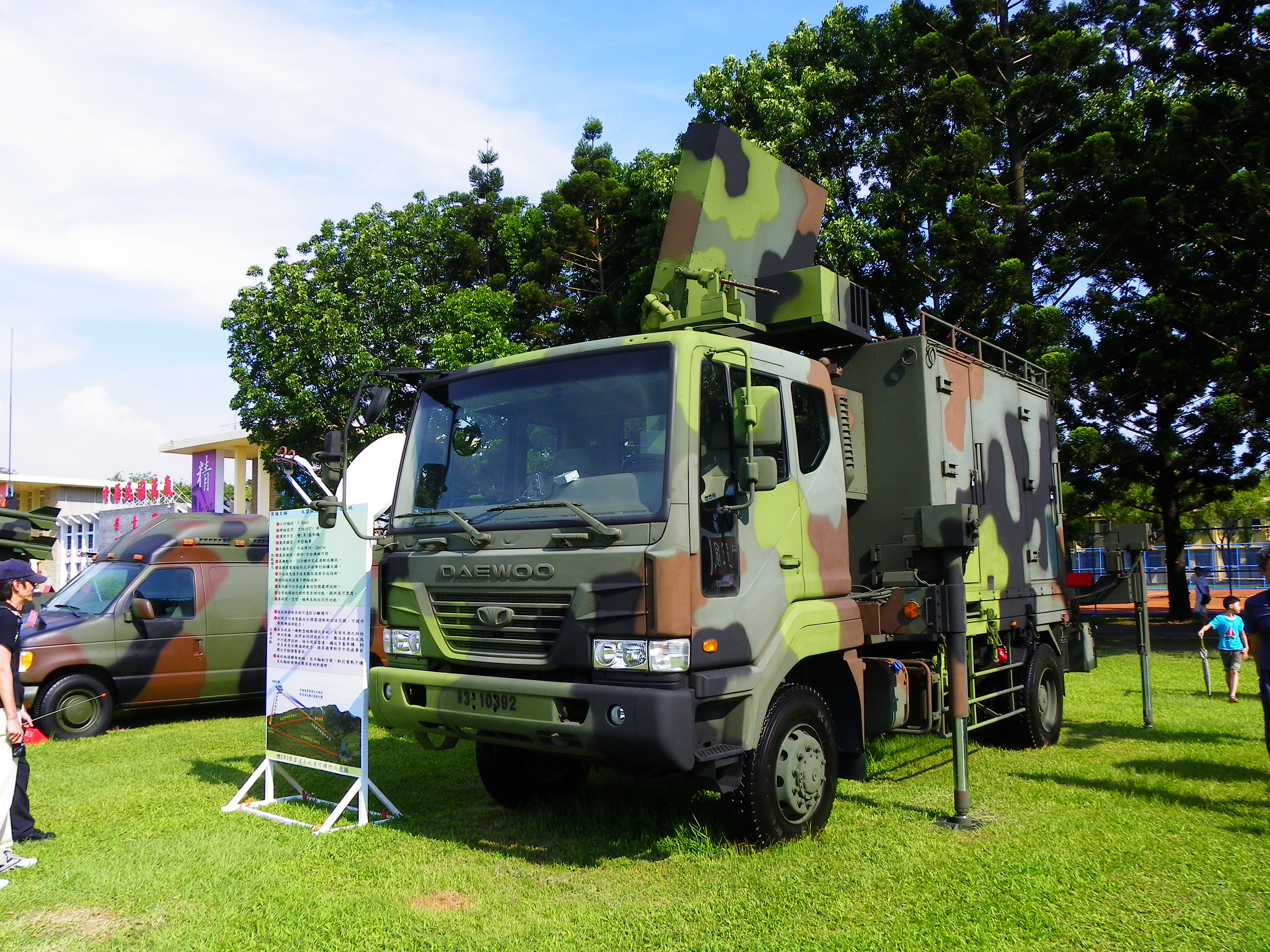
Bistatic Radar Passive Receiver System Display at Military Academy Ground

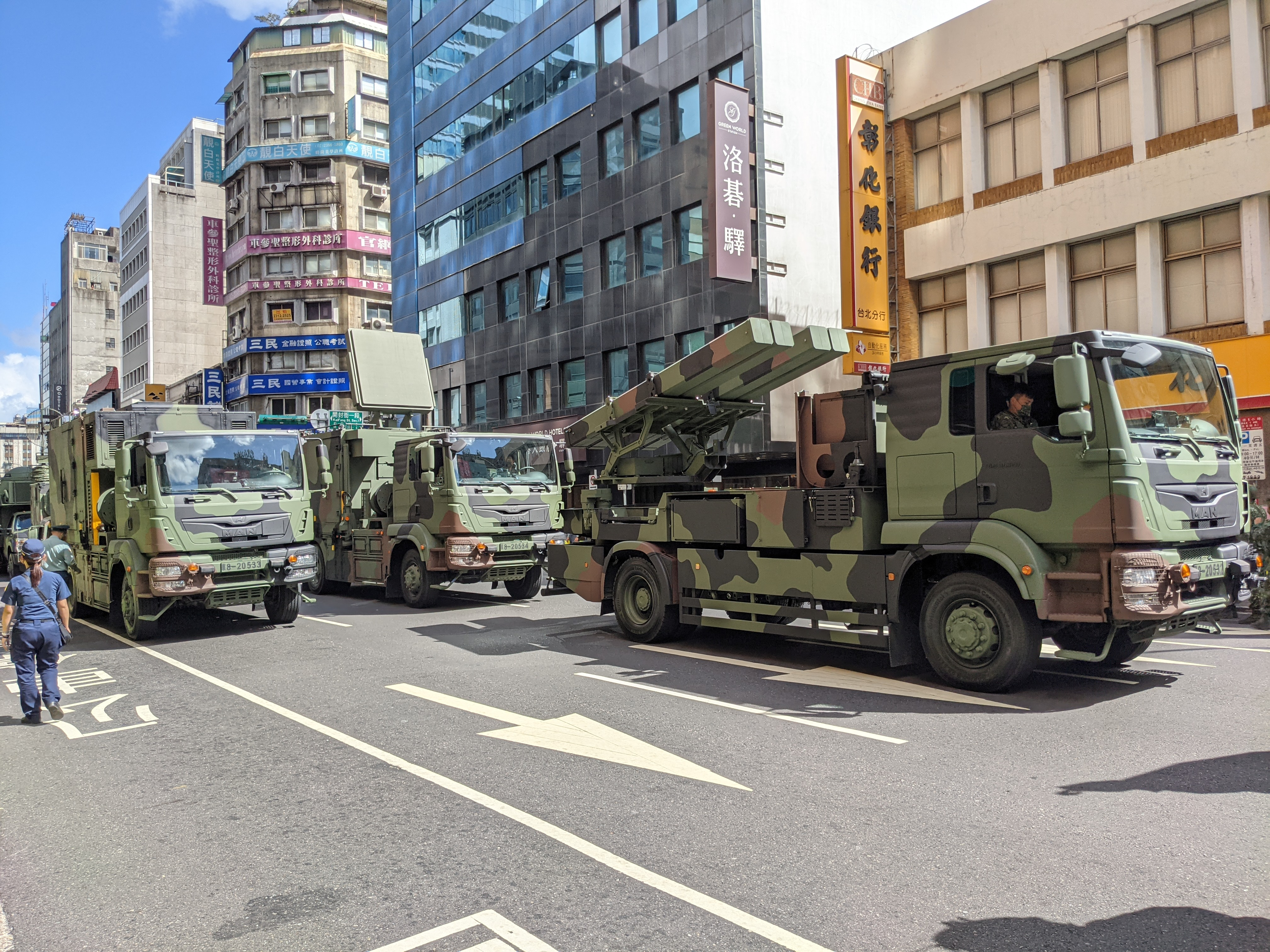
Ground based Sky Sword 2 battery

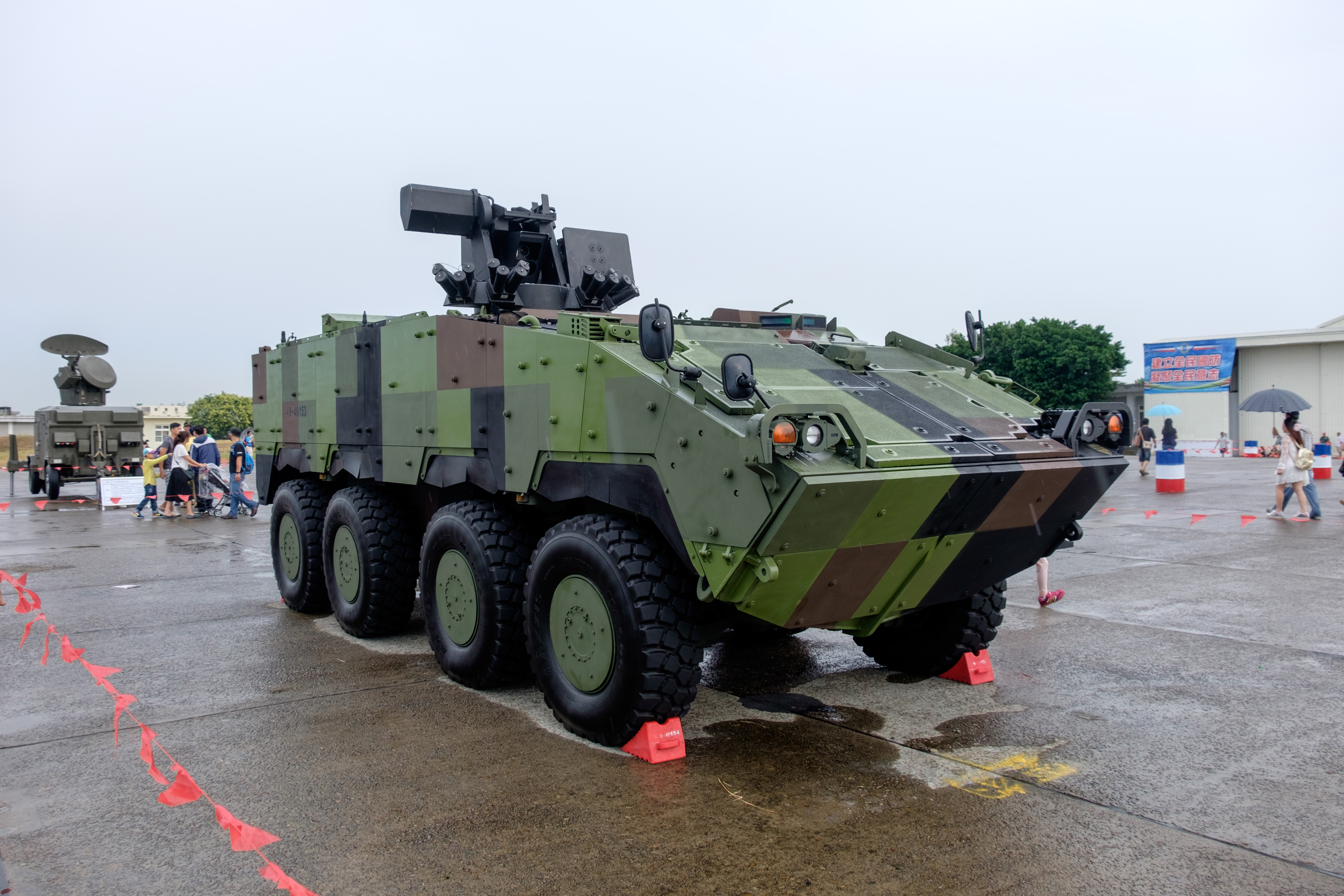
CM32 APC

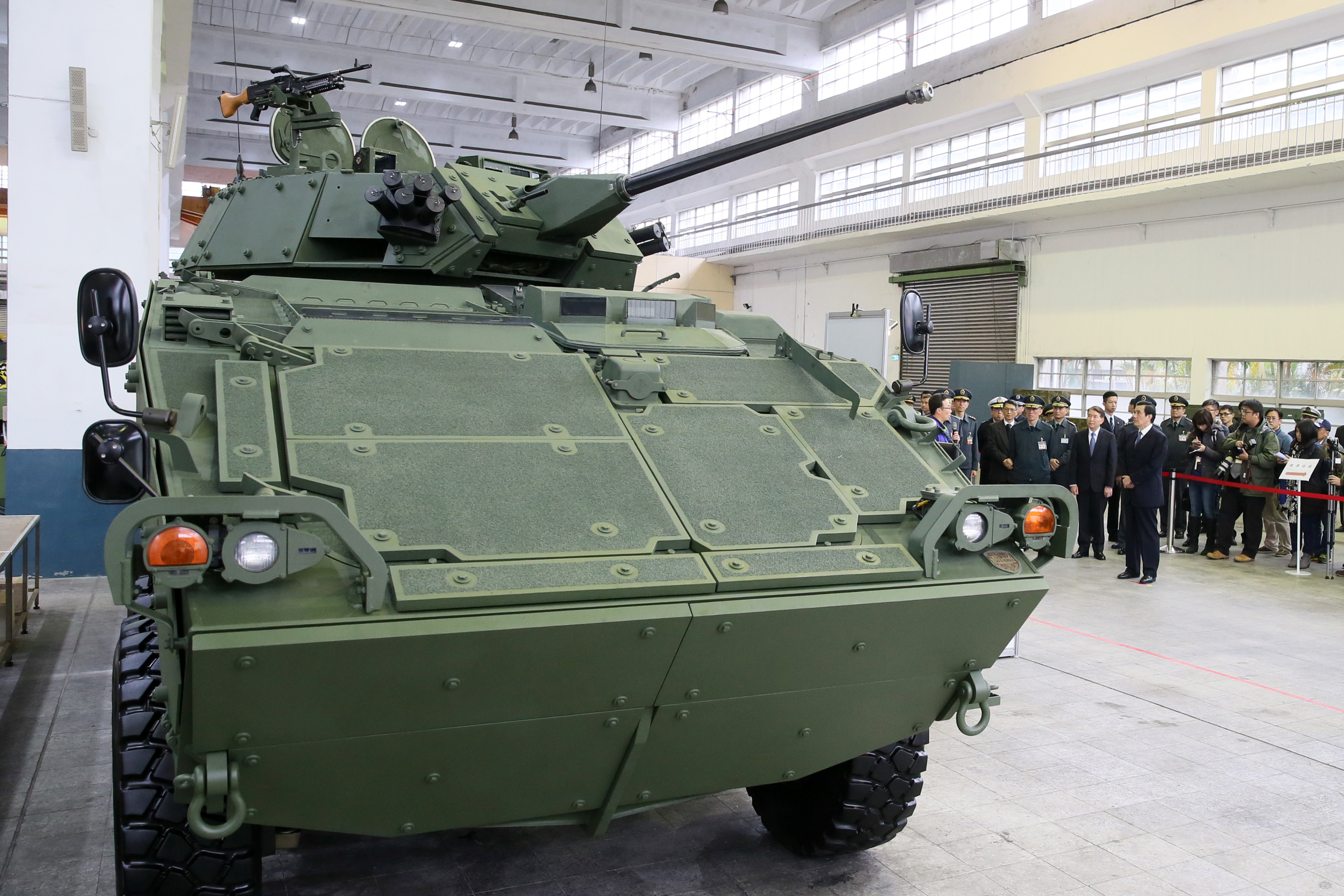
CM34, 30 mm Bushmaster cannon armed variant of the CM32

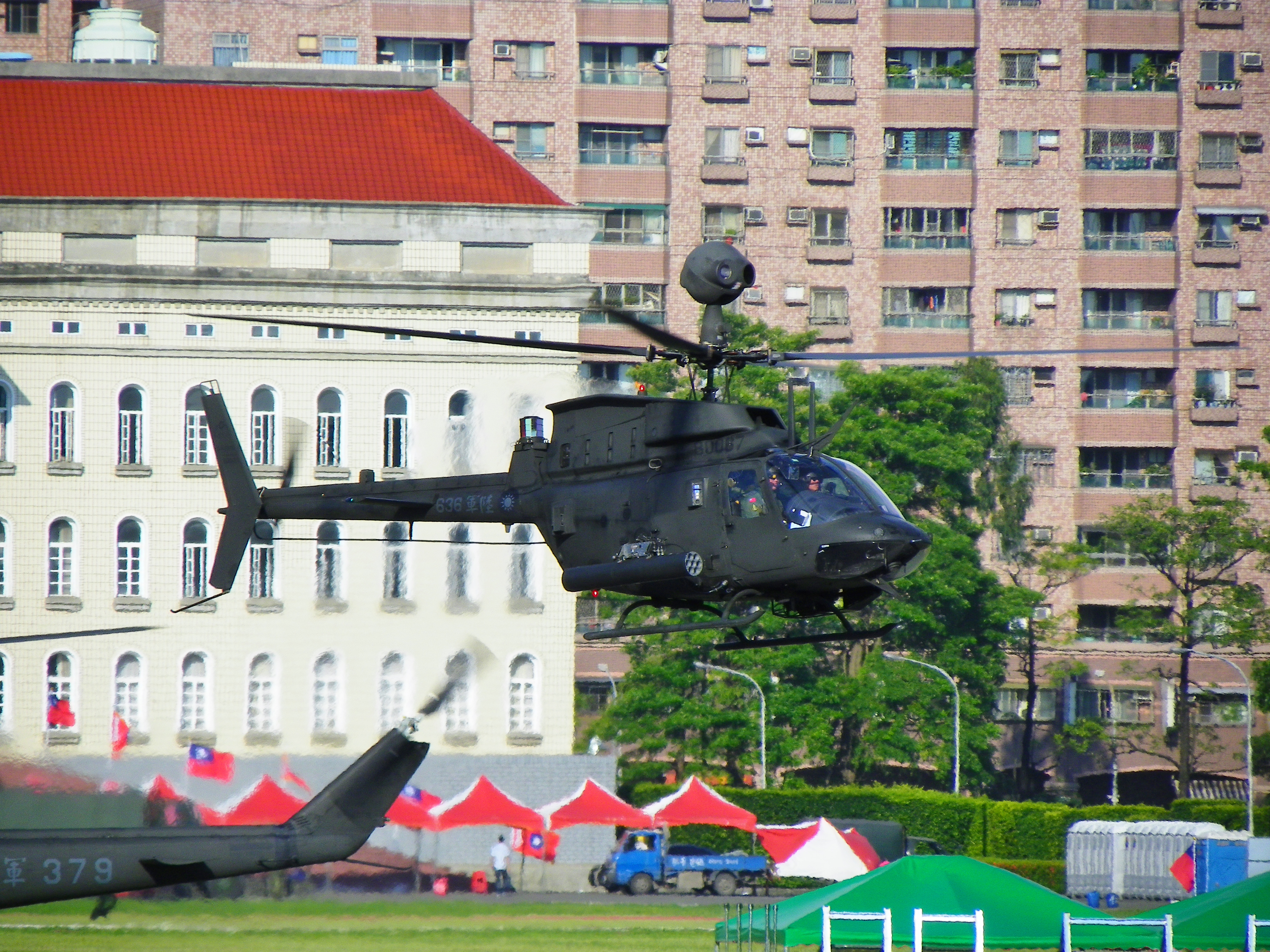
OH-58D Kiowa scout helicopter

== See also ==
- Republic of China Army rank insignia
- Ministry of National Defense (Republic of China)
- Republic of China Armed Forces
  - Republic of China Navy
    - Republic of China Marine Corps
  - Republic of China Air Force
  - Republic of China Military Police
- Orders, decorations, and medals of the Republic of China
- Political status of Taiwan
- Santikhiri, a town in Thailand settled by remnants of the 93rd Division
