= Battle of Guningtou =

1949 battle of the Chinese Civil War

Coordinates: 24°28′56″N 118°18′32″E

- Part of the Chinese Civil War
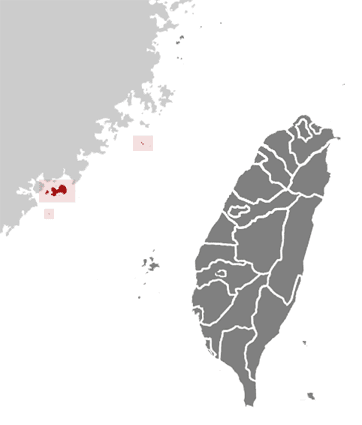
- Today's Kinmen County, ROC (Taiwan) (red) off the coast of Mainland China (light grey), relative to the rest of Taiwan (dark gray, in inset). Greater Kinmen (Quemoy) is the largest red highlighted island.
Date	25–27 October 1949 (2 days)
Location	Kinmen
Result	Republic of China victory

Belligerents
(Republic of China (1912–1949)) Republic of China	People's Republic of China

Commanders and leaders
Chiang Kai-shek; Tang Enbo; Hu Lien; Hiroshi Nemoto	Mao Zedong; Chen Yi; Su Yu; Ye Fei

Units involved
Republic of China Armed Forces; Republic of China Army; 12th Army Corps; 22nd Army Corps; 5th Army; Republic of China Navy; Republic of China Air Force	People's Liberation Army; People's Liberation Army Ground Force; 3rd Field Army; 28th Army Corps; 29th Army Corps; Maritime Militia

Strength
~40,000 garrisoned; Reinforcements during the battle; Close air support; Naval support and logistics	19,000 infantry (9,086 actually landed); Artillery support from mainland Fujian; 200 landing vessels; ~2,000 boatmen and porters

Casualties and losses
1,267 killed; 1,982 wounded	3,873 killed; 5,175 captured

Location of Guningtou on Kinmen

The Battle of Guningtou (古寧頭之役), also known as the Battle of Kuningtou or the Battle of Kinmen (Chinese: 金門戰役), was fought in October 1949 on the island of Kinmen (Quemoy), located in the Taiwan Strait, during the final stages of the Chinese Civil War.

The battle resulted in a decisive victory for the Republic of China (ROC, known today as Taiwan) forces and marked a significant turning point in the civil war. The defeat of Chinese Communist Party (CCP) forces not only preserved Kinmen under ROC control but also effectively halted CCP plans for an immediate invasion of Taiwan. The victory ensured the survival of the Republic of China government on Taiwan and reshaped the strategic landscape of the Taiwan Strait.

Starting in 2025, October 25 is designated annually as "Taiwan Retrocession Day and the Anniversary of the Battle of Guningtou" to commemorate victory of the battle along with the Taiwan Retrocession Day, which is a public holiday in Taiwan.

== Prelude ==
Following the establishment of the People's Republic of China on 1 October 1949, the government of the Republic of China (ROC) under Chiang Kai-shek began withdrawing its forces from mainland China to Taiwan. However, ROC garrisons remained stationed on the offshore islands of Kinmen (Quemoy) and the Matsu archipelago, situated just off the coast of Fujian Province. Commanders of the People's Liberation Army (PLA) viewed Kinmen and Matsu as strategically necessary stepping stones before any potential operation against Taiwan island itself.

In early July 1949, the PLA began invading Fujian under the command of the 10th Corps of the Third Field Army, led by General Ye Fei. The 10th Corps had already conducted major operations in eastern China, including the campaigns for Fuzhou, Pingtan Island, and Zhangzhou–Xiamen. On 15 October, the PLA launched an amphibious operation against Xiamen, first conducting a diversionary attack on Gulangyu to draw away ROC attention. The main force then landed on multiple beaches across Xiamen, overcoming the defending ROC troops. On 17 October, General Tang Enbo, acting director of the Fuzhou Pacification Office (福州綏靖公署), abandoned the city of Xiamen. Following the capture of Xiamen, the PLA secured positions north of Kinmen, including Dadeng Island, Xiaodeng Island, Lienho (蓮河), Shihching (石井), and Aotou (澳頭).

General Ye Fei then reassigned vessels from the PLA 32nd Army to reinforce the 28th Army, concentrating assets for a seaborne assault on Greater Kinmen. The insufficient number of transport craft, however, caused the planned crossing to be delayed several times. It was not until the evening of 24 October that the final order was given to launch the attack.

The PLA intended to land an initial force of 9,000 troops to establish a beachhead, followed by a second wave of approximately 10,000 reinforcements, expecting to seize the entire island within three days. The PLA operational plan called for landings from the areas around Aotou, Dadeng, and Lienho. However, PLA planners significantly underestimated ROC strength, believing Kinmen to be defended by no more than two understrength divisions—roughly 12,000 troops—composed mostly of green recruits and survivors from previous defeats. In reality, ROC strength on the island had been significantly reinforced.

Expecting an imminent assault, ROC commanders had begun constructing defences across the island. By October, ROC troops had laid 7,455 land mines, erected approximately 200 earthen bunkers, and deployed anti-landing beach obstacles. The island garrison included hardened veterans of earlier campaigns, supplemented by elements from the 12th Army Corps. The defensive line at the northern beaches was further strengthened by the 1st Battalion of the 3rd Tank Regiment, consisting of 22 M5A1 Stuart light tanks organised into two companies. These units had prior combat experience in the Burma campaign during the Second World War.

In the early hours of 25 October, the PLA launched its amphibious assault using hundreds of wooden fishing boats. Their aim was to land at Lungkou (壠口), the narrowest part of Kinmen. However, strong currents, poor weather, and the rudimentary design of the craft caused many of the vessels to drift off course, with large numbers instead landing further northwest at Kuningtou, where ROC defences were better entrenched.

At the time, Kinmen was home to an estimated 40,000 civilian residents. Despite its small size, the island's close proximity to the mainland rendered it strategically vital. Control of Kinmen enabled command of sea lanes to and from Xiamen, making it a critical outpost for the ROC's defensive perimeter during its retreat to Taiwan.

== People's Liberation Army ==
=== Order of battle ===
- 3rd Field Army (第三野戰軍):
  -Commander and Political Commissar: Chen Yi
  -Deputy Commander：Su Yu
  - 10th Corp
    -Commander – Ye Fei
    -Director of Political Department – Liu Peishan
    - 28th Army
      -Commander – Zhu Shaoqing
      -Deputy Commander and Main Planner of the Attack Plan – Xiao Feng (蕭鋒)
      -Deputy Political Commissar – Li Mancun (李曼村)
    - 29th Army
      -Commander – Hu Bingwen (胡炳雲)
      -Deputy Commander – Duan Huanjing (段煥競)
      -Deputy Political Commissar – Huang Huoxing (黃火星)

=== Preparations for the campaign ===
Following rapid advances into Northern and Southern Fujian, the People's Liberation Army (PLA) 10th Corps had positioned seven armies (the 25th, 27th, 28th, 29th, 30th, 31st, and 32nd) along the Fujian front by September–October 1949. However, the PLA lacked experience in naval operations and had no air or naval cover for amphibious assaults. The 10th Corps planned to seize Greater Kinmen using elements from the 28th and 29th Armies—seven regiments in total—under the command of the 28th Army. Simultaneously, the 31st Army was tasked with capturing Lesser Kinmen.

Nevertheless, since the crossing of the Yangtze River, the PLA's Third Field Army had not encountered large-scale organised resistance from ROC forces. As a result, no detailed staff planning or training had been conducted for amphibious operations. Most coastal vessels had been destroyed by the ROC Regime, and only a limited number of civilian boats had been requisitioned, sufficient to transport just one battalion at a time. Owing to this severe shortage, the plan to involve the 31st Army was cancelled, and it was decided that the 28th Army alone would launch the assault on both Greater and Lesser Kinmen.

PLA intelligence also proved unreliable. During the earlier battle for Dadeng and Xiaodeng, soldiers from the ROC 31st Regiment, 11th Division, 18th Army—part of the 12th Army Corps—were captured. PLA 28th Army Deputy Commander Xiao Feng personally interrogated the prisoners and reported his findings to higher command. However, senior leaders dismissed the intelligence, believing the defending forces were preparing to retreat. Even General Ye Fei remarked, "Impossible. Hu Lien's Army Corps is still in the Teochew-[Shantou] region and has not yet moved", adding, "It seems there will be no major battles left on the mainland. Let the 28th Army just wrap things up."

Under repeated urging from the PLA 10th Corps commanding section, the 28th Army finally issued orders for the assault on Greater Kinmen on 18 October. On 21 October, PLA reconnaissance confirmed the arrival of the ROC 12th Army Corps at Kinmen Bay, having begun maritime transport from Teochew and Shantou. By 23 October, the 118th Division had already landed on Greater Kinmen, with follow-on units en route.

Despite these developments, PLA command remained uncertain whether the ROC intended to reinforce Kinmen or withdraw to Taiwan. Consequently, no contingency measures were implemented. On 24 October, the PLA 28th Army reported that the assault on Kinmen would commence that night. During a command meeting, General Ye Fei inquired whether the ROC 12th Army Corps had arrived on Kinmen. Staff officers incorrectly replied that the force was still at sea. Based on this assessment, Ye authorised the operation to begin before ROC reinforcements could arrive.

That evening, the PLA's first echelon—comprising three regiments and over 9,000 troops from the 28th Army—was dispatched for the landing.

=== PLA's plan for the operation ===
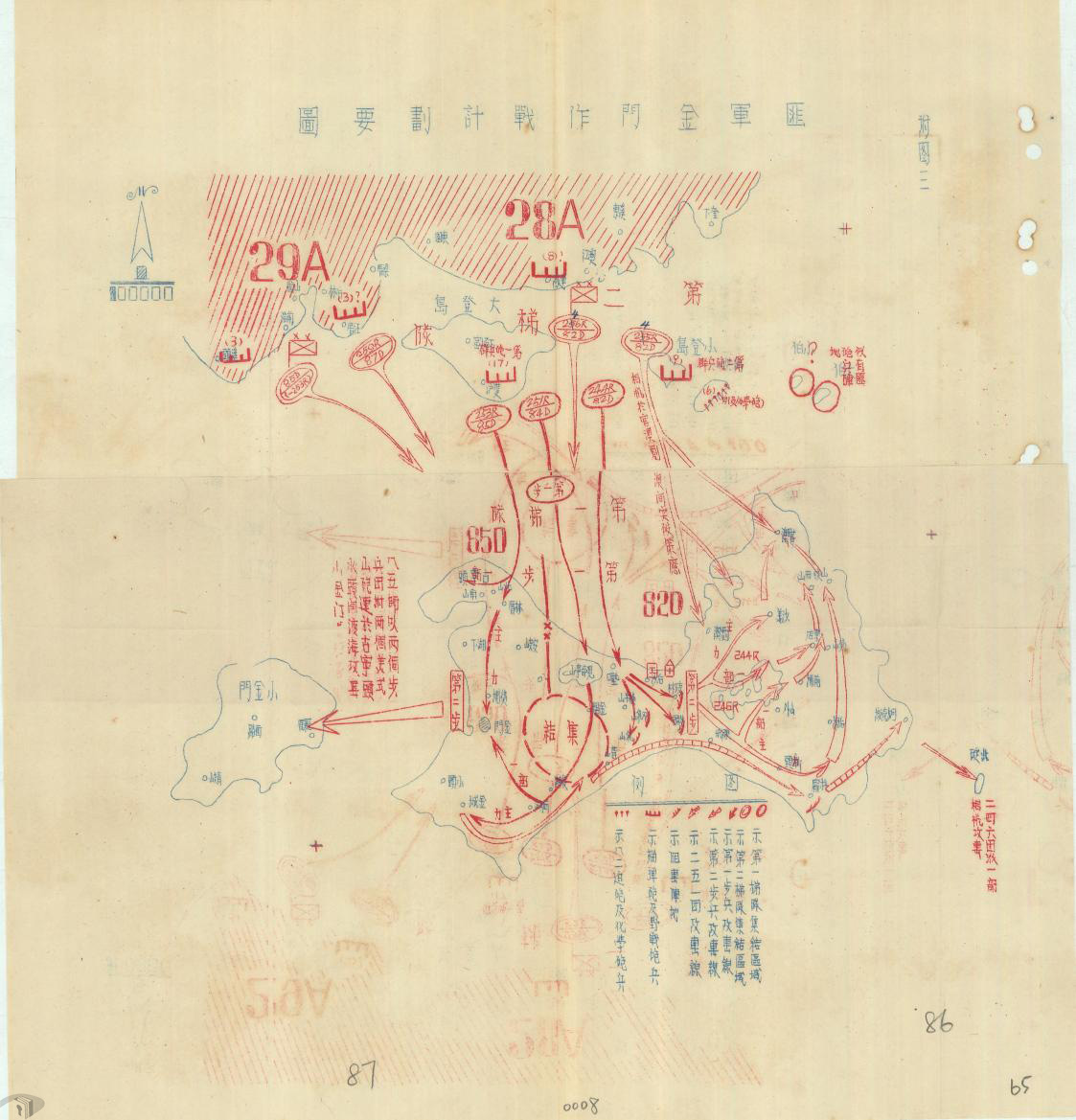
PLA Plan for the Campaign, as drawn by the ROC intelligence services

After the fall of Fuzhou to the People's Liberation Army (PLA), the PLA 10th Corps convened a combat planning meeting, deciding to launch the Zhangzhou–Xiamen–Kinmen campaign in mid-September 1949. On 19 September, the PLA planned to first seize Zhangzhou. During a follow-up meeting on 26 September regarding operational plans for the Kinmen–Xiamen campaign, three options were proposed: "seize Kinmen and Xiamen simultaneously", "Xiamen first, Kinmen later", and "Kinmen first, Xiamen later". After repeated discussions and analysis, General Ye Fei chose the "simultaneous seizure of Kinmen and Xiamen" plan. The 28th Army would be tasked with capturing Kinmen, while the 29th and 31st Armies would focus on Xiamen. On 11 October, the East China Field Army replied in agreement, expressing concerns over whether sufficient shipping was available. The message stated that if preparations were complete, both Kinmen and Xiamen could be seized simultaneously; otherwise, Xiamen should be taken first, followed by Kinmen. The final decision was to be made by the 10th Corps based on the situation.

On 4 October, the 10th Corps issued a preliminary combat directive assigning the 31st and 29th Armies to capture Xiamen and the 28th Army to capture Kinmen. The severe shortage of vessels caused the operational plan to be changed from "simultaneous seizure" to "Xiamen first, Kinmen later." Between 10 and 12 October, the 28th Army occupied Dadeng and Xiaodeng Islands. The army then deployed along the line from Lienho to Dadeng, Xiaodeng, and Shihching, maintaining close surveillance of ROC forces on Kinmen. On 17 October, the PLA captured Xiamen. After the fall of Xiamen, Deputy Commander of the 28th Army, Xiao Feng, issued an order on 18 October to initiate operations against Kinmen. The assault was scheduled to begin on 20 October, involving six regiments in two echelons. The first echelon would land in three routes:

- The eastern route, led by the 244th Regiment, was to land between Lungkou (壠口) and Housha (後沙) on Kinmen, quickly advancing to capture Houpan Hill (後半山) and Shuangju Hill (雙乳山), and establishing control over the midsection of Kinmen from Chiunglin (瓊林) to Shatou (沙頭). This would secure the eastern peninsula and protect the flanks of the 251st and 253rd Regiments during their assault on the county seat.
- The central route, led by the 251st Regiment, was to land between Hsipao (西堡) and Kuningtou, rapidly advancing toward the Hunan Heights (湖南高地) and Panglin (榜林) to support the 253rd Regiment in attacking the Kinmen Capital Buildings neighbourhood.
- The western route, led by the 253rd Regiment, was to land at Kuningtou, quickly seize Lintso (林厝) and Putou (埔頭), and proceed with an assault on the county seat, aiming to annihilate ROC forces on the western half of the island.

Following the proposed destruction of ROC forces on the western peninsula, the next phase would involve all three regiments from the first echelon, joined by three more from the second echelon and the 92nd Division in reserve. These forces were to advance from Shuangju Hill in two columns, north and south, to encircle and eliminate ROC forces on the eastern peninsula. The entire operation was projected to be completed within three days.

=== Attack waves ===
- First Wave
  - 82nd Division, 244th Regiment of the 28th Army
  - 84th Division, 251st Regiment of the 28th Army
  - 85th Division, 253rd Regiment of the 29th Army
- Second Wave (only 10 platoons actually landed)
  - 82nd Division, 245th Regiment of the 28th Army
  - 82nd Division, 246th Regiment of the 28th Army (2 companies sent for reinforcement)
  - 87th Division, 259th Regiment of the 29th Army (2 companies sent for reinforcement)

== Republic of China Armed Forces ==
=== Order of battle ===
-Chief Executive of the Southeast Military and Political Office: Chen Cheng
-Deputy Chief Executive: Luo Zhuoying
-Acting Director of the Fuzhou Pacification Office: Tang Enbo

==== Republic of China Army ====
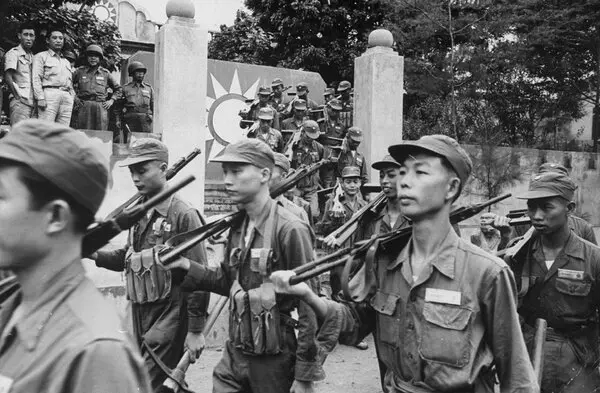
ROC soldiers parade through Kinmen following their victory at Guningtou. The ROC success marked a critical turning point, halting the PLA's advance toward Taiwan.

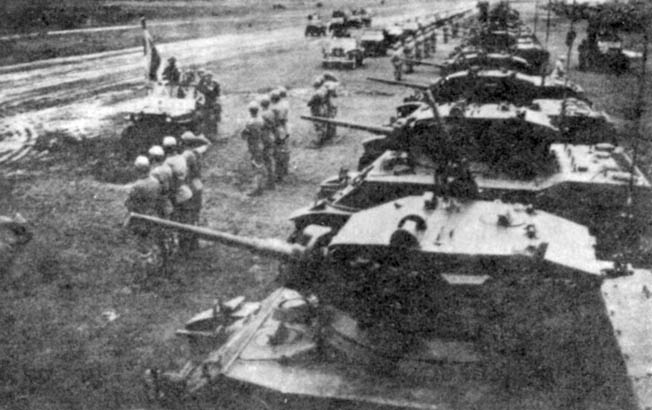
President Chiang Kai-shek reviews the victorious tank crews of the 1st Battalion, 3rd Tank Regiment, following the Battle of Kinmen.

- 12th Army Corps (第12兵團)
  -Commander: Hu Lien (胡璉)
  -Deputy Commander: Ko Yüan-Fen (柯遠芬)
  -Chief of Staff: Yang Wei-Han (楊維翰)
  - Corps Headquarters (第18軍)
  - 18th Army:
    -Commander: Kao Kuei-yuan
    -Deputy Commanders Liu Ching-jung (劉景蓉), and Hsiao Jui (蕭銳)
    - 11th Division:
      -Commander: Liu Ting-han (劉鼎漢)
      -Deputy Commander: Chai Lien-Yün (翟連運)
      - 31st Regiment – Commander: Chan Yih-Hui (陳以惠), stationed in eastern Kinmen
      - 32nd Regiment – Commander: Wang Cheng-Hua (王誠華)
        -stationed in eastern Kinmen
      - 33rd Regiment – Commander: Lu Chih-Chia (陸志家)
        -On Lesser Kinmen, also known as Liehyü (烈嶼)
    - 118th Division (第118師) – Mobile strike force
      -Commander: Lee Shu-Lan (李樹蘭)
      - 352nd Regiment – Commander: Tang Chun-Hsien (唐俊賢)
      - 353rd Regiment – Commander: Yang Shu-Tien (楊書田)
      - 354th Regiment – Commander: Lin Shu-Chiao (林書嶠)
  - 19th Army (第19軍)
    -Commander: Liu Yün-Han (劉雲瀚)
    -Deputy Commander: Wu Chui-Kun (吳垂昆)
    - 13th Division (第13師) – Commander: Wu Chui-Kun (吳垂昆), did not engage in combat
      - 37th Regiment – stationed in eastern Kinmen
      - 38th Regiment – stationed in eastern Kinmen
      - 39th Regiment – stationed in Kinmen County seat, served as reserve force
    - 14th Division (第14師)
      -Commander: Lo Hsi-Chou (羅錫疇)
      -stationed in Kinmen County
      - 40th Regiment – Commander: Huang Yü-Hsüan (黃煜軒)
        -did not engage in battle; landed post-conflict
      - 41st Regiment – Commander: Liao Hsien-Hung (廖先鴻)
      - 42nd Regiment – Commander: Lee Kuang-Chien (李光前)
    - 18th Division (第18師)
      -Commander: Yin Chun (尹俊)
      -stationed in Chinsha
      -missing 53rd Regiment
      - 52nd Regiment – Commander: Sun Chu-Chün (孫竹筠)
      - 54th Regiment – Commander: Wen Lee-Hui (文立徽)
- 22nd Army Corps (第22兵團)

Commander: Lee Liang-Jung (李良榮)

  - Army Corps Headquarters
  - 25th Army (第25軍)
    -Commander: Shen Hsiang-Kuei (沈向奎)
    - 40th Division-Commander: Fan Lin (范麟)
    - 45th Division-Commander: Lao Sheng-Huan (勞聲寰), stationed at Mt. Taiwu and Chinhu
    - 201st Division, Youth Army (青年軍第201師)
      -Commander: Cheng Kuo (鄭果)
      -Missing 603rd Regiment
      - 601st Regiment – Commander: Lei Kai-Hsüan (雷開瑄), stationed at Kuningtou and Chinning
      - 602nd Regiment – Commander: Foo Yih-Jen (傅伊仁), stationed in western Kinmen and Kincheng
- Independent Units
  - 1st Battalion, 3rd Independent Tank Regiment (獨立戰車第三團第一營)
    -Battalion Commander: Chen Chen-Wei (陳振威)
    -Missing 2nd Company
    - 1st Company – Commander: Hu Ke-Hwa (胡克華)
      - M5A1 Stuart light tanks
    - 3rd Company – Commander: Chou Ming-Chin (周名琴), mobile strike unit
      - M5A1 Stuart light tanks
  - 7th Company, 3rd Independent Artillery Regiment (獨立砲兵第三團第七連)
  - 1st Company, 14th Independent Artillery Regiment (獨立砲兵第十四團第一連)
  - 3rd Battalion, 20th Independent Engineer Regiment (獨立工兵第二十團第三營)
- 5th Army (第5軍)
  -Commander: Lee Yün-Cheng (李運成)
  -On Lesser Kinmen, also known as Liehyü (烈嶼)
  -Did not engage in combat
  - 166th Division – Commander: Ye Hui-Hsi (葉會西)
  - 200th Division – Commander: Ma Hsin-Chüan (麻心全)

==== Republic of China Air Force ====
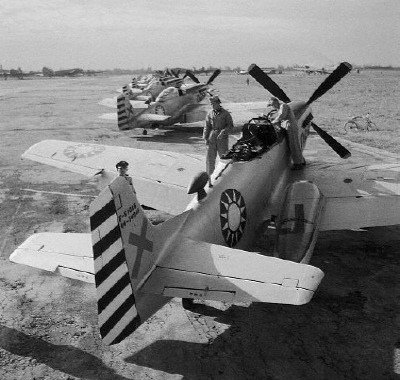
Republic of China Air Force North American P-51D Mustang fighters based in Taiwan, circa 1949.

Commander-in-Chief: Chou Chih-Jou (周至柔)

- 1st Bomber Group (第一轟炸機大隊)
  - 1st Squadron – North American B-25J Mitchell
  - 3rd Squadron – North American B-25J Mitchell
  - 4th Squadron – North American B-25J Mitchell
- 3rd Pursuit Group (第三戰鬥機大隊)
  - 7th Squadron – North American P-51D/K Mustang
  - 8th Squadron – North American P-51D/K Mustang
- 6th Composite Group (第六混編大隊)
  - 5th Squadron – de Havilland DH.98 Mosquito
- 8th Bomber Group (第一轟炸機大隊)
  – Consolidated B-24M Liberator
- 10th Air Lift Group (第十運輸機大隊)
  – Douglas C-47B Skytrain
- 11th Pursuit Group (第十一戰鬥機大隊)
  – Republic P-47D/N Thunderbolt

==== Republic of China Navy ====
Commander-in-Chief: Kuei Yung-Ching (桂永清)

- 2nd Fleet
  – Fleet Commander: Lee Yü-Hsi (黎玉璽)
  - ROCS Tai Ping F-22 (太平艦)
  - ROCS Chung Yung LST-210 (中榮艦)
  - ROCS Lien-Cheng (聯錚艦)
  - ROCS Chu-Kuan (楚觀艦)
  - ROCS Nan-an (南安艦)
  - ROCS Huaiyin (淮陰艦)
  - ASW Boat No. 202 (驅潛二〇二)
  - ASW Boat No. 203 (驅潛二〇三)
  - Gunboat No. 15 (砲十五艇)
  - Gunboat No. 16 (砲十六艇)

=== Preparations for the campaign ===
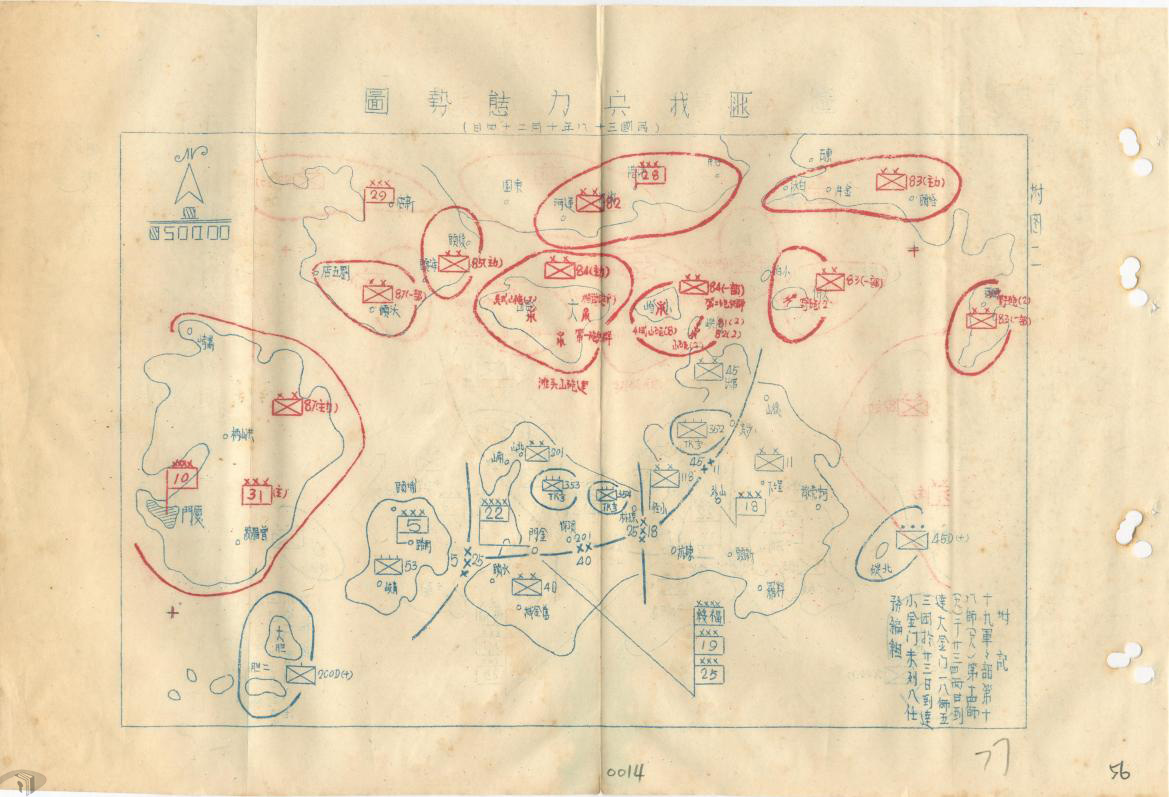
Map of Troop Deployments by Both Sides

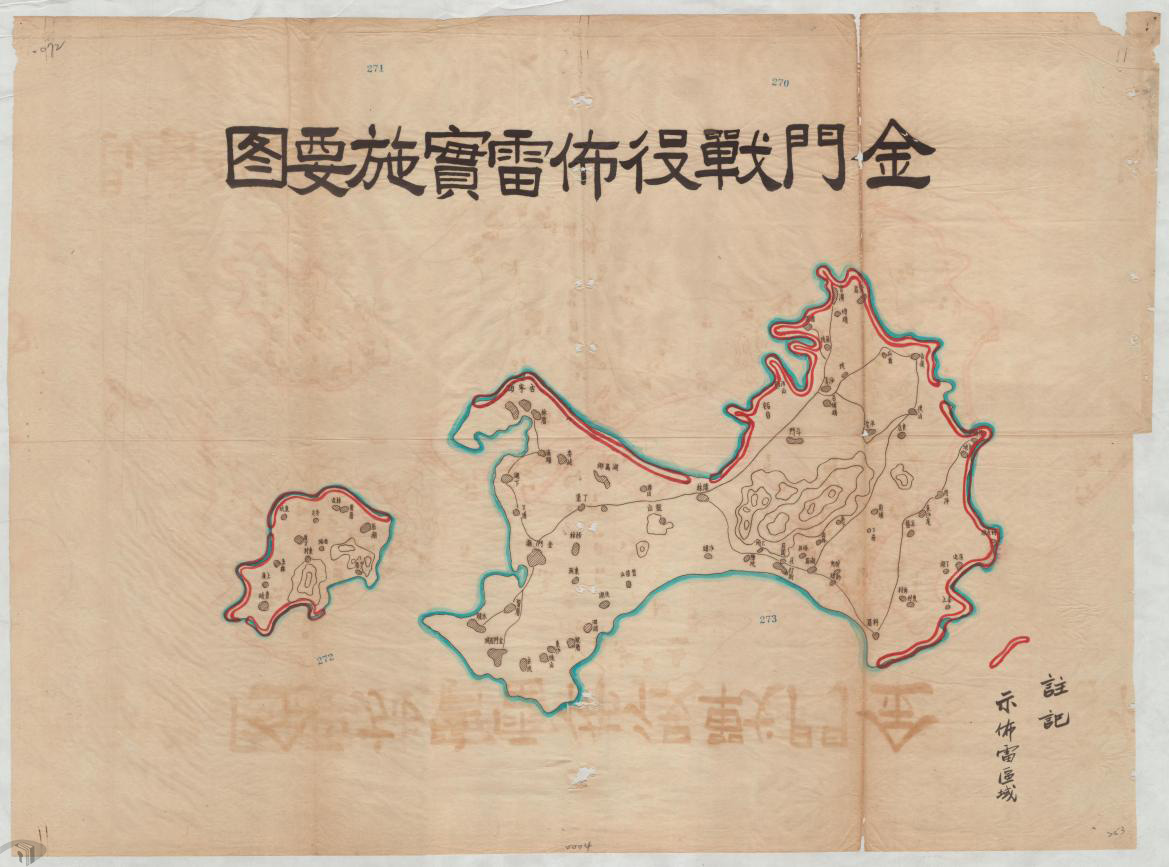
Map of Coastal Mine Placements by the 19th Army of the Republic of China Army

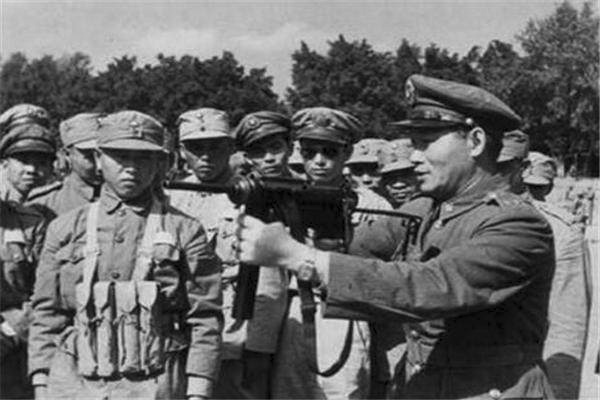
General Sun Li-Jen instructing recruits of the 201st Division in the use of an M3 submachine gun at Fongshan, Taiwan, circa 1949. Most recruits were recent school graduates from mainland China and were trained according to United States Army doctrines. The 201st Division later played a key role in the defence of Kinmen during the Battle of Kuningtou, inflicting heavy casualties on the PLA while maintaining a relatively low casualty rate of their own.

Before June 1949 (38th year of the Republic), the Republic of China (ROC) had established no defences on Kinmen (Quemoy) Island. It was only by mid-June that the Xiamen Fortress Command (廈門要塞司令部) formally established the Kinmen Fortress Headquarters (金門要塞總台) and began constructing fortifications and laying communication lines. The eastern region of Greater Kinmen featured high cliffs, making landings difficult, whereas the western region was relatively flat, with the northern shore consisting of sandy beaches suitable for amphibious landings—hence the primary focus of ROC defensive preparations.

Apart from a few existing Japanese-built fortifications, new field defences and obstacles were installed along potential landing zones. The island's initial garrison included the entire 22nd Army Corps, the Youth Army's 201st Division, and the 11th Division of the 12th Army Corps, totalling over 20,000 troops. In order to strengthen Kinmen's defences, the 18th and 19th Armies under the 12th Army Corps were gradually redeployed from the Teochew–Shantou area after 10 October. By 24 October, ROC troop strength on Kinmen had increased to over 40,000.

On 17 August, following the fall of Fuzhou, General Tang Enbo withdrew to Xiamen. Liu Ruming, commander of the 8th Army Corps, was tasked with defending the Zhangzhou–Xiamen sector, while Lee Liang-Jung, commander of the 22nd Army Corps, handed over the Xiamen Garrison to Mao Sen and redeployed to Kinmen. On 19 August, after the 7th Army Corps took over defensive responsibilities in Xiamen, the 25th Army (commanded by Shen Hsiang-Kuei, with the 45th Division under Lao Sheng-Huan and the 40th Division under Fan Lin) arrived on Kinmen. The 22nd Army Corps completed its redeployment to Greater and Lesser Kinmen by 25 August.

On 3 September, the 201st Division of the 80th Army—reorganised from the Independent 1st Brigade in September 1948, and commanded by Cheng Kuo—was transferred to Kinmen from Taiwan, where it had been trained under General Sun Li-jen in Fongshan, Taiwan. The division's 601st and 602nd Regiments, totalling over 3,000 men, were deployed to the island. (The 603rd Regiment had previously been sent to Ma-wei in Fujian to reinforce the Fuzhou campaign and was subsequently lost.) Later, the 1st Battalion (excluding the 2nd Company) of the 3rd Armoured Regiment, with 21 M5A1 light tanks, was also deployed to Kinmen. The final major reinforcement arrived on 8 October, when the 18th Army (commanded by Kao Kuei-yuan, with the 11th Division under Liu Ting-Han, 43rd Division under Pao Pu-Chao, and 118th Division under Lee Shu-Lan) was transported from Shantou.

The 22nd Army Corps Headquarters, the 45th and 201st Divisions, the 3rd Armoured Regiment, and units of the 12th Army Corps were deployed across Greater Kinmen, while the 40th Division was assigned to the defence of Dadeng and Xiaodeng Islands.

On Greater Kinmen, the 601st Regiment held the northern sector around Kuningtou, while the 602nd Regiment was stationed in the west. The two regiments formed a defensive line stretching between Chiunglin (瓊林) and Kuningtou. Although defensive earthworks and bunkers were constructed upon arrival, limited access to building materials meant that many positions were built from simple earthen mounds. Timber and other supplies were requisitioned locally to support construction.

On 11 September, Luo Zhuoying, Deputy Chief of the ROC Southeast Military and Political Office (東南軍政長官公署), accompanied Chief Chen Cheng on an inspection of Xiamen and later travelled to Shantou to meet with Fang Tien and General Hu Lien, before returning to Taipei on 12 September. In mid-September, the 5th Army, though understrength with only the 200th Division remaining, was returned to the 22nd Army Corps and assigned to garrison Lesser Kinmen.

By October, with much of northern Fujian under CCP control and the loss of Zhangzhou, pressure on southern Fujian intensified. Although the 22nd Army Corps included multiple divisions and support elements on paper, many units remained under-equipped. In response, Chen Cheng tasked Luo Zhuoying with arranging the redeployment of the 12th Army Corps to Kinmen.

Originally operating in the Guangzhou theatre, the 12th Army Corps' 18th and 19th Armies conducted recruitment and reorganisation efforts during their retreat through Zhejiang and Jiangxi following the Huaihai campaign. After crossing into southern China in May 1949, General Hu Lien oversaw the reassembly of these forces using a regional recruitment strategy. By the time they reached Teochew–Shantou, the 12th Army Corps was reported to have reached a strength of approximately 100,000 troops.

Mainland Chinese Communist narratives have traditionally claimed that the 12th Army Corps was largely composed of forcibly conscripted recruits during this period, leading to an expectation among PLA commanders that its combat morale and effectiveness would be low during the Battle of Kuningtou. However, reports emerging from independent media sources since the 2000s suggest a more complex reality. According to these accounts, a significant portion of the new recruits were in fact volunteers, many being descendants of landlord and wealthy farming families who had suffered persecution during the early Chinese Soviet Republic period. In particular, a large number were drawn from the former Jiangxi Soviet Base area and were known as Southern Jiangxi Recruits (贛南子弟). This background, combined with deep grievances against earlier Communist purges, contributed to the unexpectedly high morale and resilience displayed by ROC forces during the battle.

On 8 October, Kao Kuei-yuan led his forces from Shantou to Kinmen by sea. On 10 October, the People's Liberation Army (PLA) launched attacks on Dadeng and Xiaodeng. These were garrisoned by the 40th Division with support from the 11th Division. Despite resistance, the islands were lost and remaining ROC forces withdrew to Kinmen. ROC commanders now recognised Kinmen and Xiamen as the next likely battlegrounds.

On 10 and 14 October, the ROC transferred additional units to Kinmen, including the 18th Army (11th, 118th, and 43rd Divisions—although the 43rd Division did not participate in the Battle of Kuningtou) and the 19th Army (13th, 14th, and 18th Divisions). By 24 October, total ROC strength on Kinmen exceeded 40,000. The 19th Army, originally designated for the Zhejiang front, was redirected to Kinmen by order of the ROC Southeast Military and Political Office on 19 October. Until the full arrival of the 12th Army Corps, operational command of the island remained with Lee Liang-Jung.

In addition to ground reinforcements, the Republic of China Air Force (ROCAF) launched aerial attacks from October onward against PLA shipping between Xiamen and Kinmen. On 18 October, ROCAF aircraft conducted a major operation targeting a PLA landing exercise near Xiamen, destroying hundreds of motorised junks and hindering the PLA's amphibious transport capacity.

According to mainland Chinese PLA General Wang Hung-Kuang, Deputy Commander of the PLA's Nanjing Military Region, ROC troop strength on Greater and Lesser Kinmen during the campaign was approximately 60,000. However, many units were understrength. Of these, only around 20,000 troops were deemed combat effective, with about 10,000 concentrated in the western half of Greater Kinmen—the area where the main battle would unfold.

== Battle ==
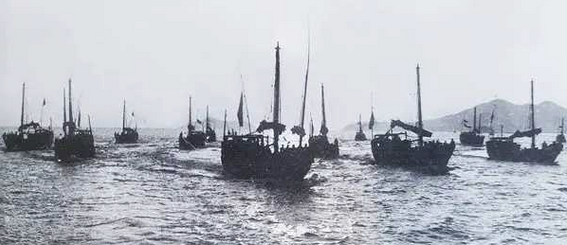
A formation of PLA wooden junks en route to Kinmen during the Battle of Kuningtou, October 1949.

On 15 October, the PLA captured Guangzhou, and the ROC 12th Army Corps was placed under the command of the Southeast Military and Political Office. Chen Cheng immediately ordered Hu Lien to lead the 19th and 67th Armies to redeploy to Chusan. On 16 October, Tang Enbo, Chairman of the Fujian Provincial Government and Commander of the Xiamen Garrison, relocated his headquarters to Kinmen. While Hu Lien's forces were still en route by sea, the PLA suddenly captured Xiamen on 17 October.

Chen Cheng assessed that the defences on Kinmen were critically weak and that if the island were lost, the entire coastal region would be compromised, and even Taiwan itself would come under direct threat. He, therefore, dispatched envoys to Guangzhou to seek Chiang Kai-shek's approval, with Wang Shih-chieh personally presenting the situation. At the time, Chiang Kai-shek was preparing to fly to Chungking to organise military affairs in the southwest of Mainland China, but upon receiving Chen Cheng's report, he diverted to Taipei instead. Chen Cheng then modified his original deployment orders, instructing Hu Lien to redirect the second convoy already at sea to reinforce Kinmen. With Chiang's approval, Chen Cheng also transferred the ROC 19th Army (under Major General Liu Yün-Han, comprising the 13th, 14th, and 18th Divisions) to further bolster Kinmen's defences.

Following the fall of Xiamen, the PLA's 10th Army Corps continued advancing, capturing Shihching, Lienho, Greater Tatan, Lesser Tatan, and Aotou north of Kinmen. On 18 October, under pressure from higher command, the PLA's 28th Army issued deployment orders to assault Kinmen: six regiments, comprising the entirety of the 82nd Division and elements from the 84th and 85th Divisions, were to attack in two echelons. Upon securing Kinmen, two regiments of the 85th Division were assigned to capture Lesser Kinmen. The operation was initially scheduled to commence on 20 October.

At this time, the PLA's 10th Army Corps urged the 28th Army to accelerate preparations and called for the concentration of all available vessels to support the crossing. However, the severe shortages in transport ships caused the planned attack to be postponed to 23 October.

On 22 October, the acting Director of the Fuzhou Pacification Office, Tang Enbo, issued an order stating that "all units on Kinmen shall be placed under the unified command of Lee Liang-Jung of the 22nd Army Corps until the arrival of Commander Hu Lien of the 12th Army Corps." That evening, the ROC 19th Army arrived off Kinmen, but inefficiencies in landing operations caused only half of the troops to have disembarked by the evening of 24 October.

Meanwhile, by 23 October, the PLA's 28th Army had concentrated sufficient vessels to transport three regiments. The 10th Army Corps leadership decided to seize the opportunity before ROC reinforcements could fully arrive, launching an amphibious assault on Kinmen. It was estimated that, with two transport runs, a total of five regiments could be landed within one night, achieving a force parity of approximately 1:1. This led to a decision to commence the attack on 24 October.

The PLA operational plan called for the 244th Regiment of the 82nd Division, the 251st Regiment of the 84th Division, and the 253rd Regiment of the 85th Division to form the first wave, under unified command of the 82nd Division. They would depart from Lienho, Greater Tatan, and Aotou's northeastern harbour, respectively, landing along the stretch from Huwei to Kuningtou on northern Kinmen. The goal was to destroy ROC forces in the western half of the island first, before joining subsequent echelons to eliminate defenders in the eastern half. The campaign was intended to be concluded within three days.

On 24 October, ROC naval and ground forces stationed off Kinmen successfully deterred PLA advances for a full day. That morning, the PLA convened a combat conference to reaffirm their resolve. Following directives from higher command stressing the need for swift action, the 28th Army's deputy commander, Xiao Feng, ordered the attack to proceed that night.

At 20:00, the PLA's first wave — consisting of the 244th, 251st, and 253rd Regiments, and elements of the 246th Regiment from the 82nd Division — set sail as planned, departing from Lienho, Greater Tatan, and Houcun (後村). The weather was poor, with darkness and a northeast wind of force three to four, while the tide was gradually rising.

However, many of the PLA chartered civilian boatmen were hastily recruited from areas such as Fuzhou and Quanzhou, and were unfamiliar with local maritime conditions. Moreover, there had been little prior training or coordination, and the 82nd Division's command post did not accompany the landing forces, causing severe communication breakdowns. Each unit thus advanced independently.

Strong winds, poor navigational knowledge of tidal patterns, and the lack of coordination resulted in the landing craft becoming stranded in shallow waters as the tide receded. Near the shoreline, they came under heavy ROC artillery fire, causing casualties even before reaching the beaches.

=== 25 October 1949 ===
==== Battle unfolds ====
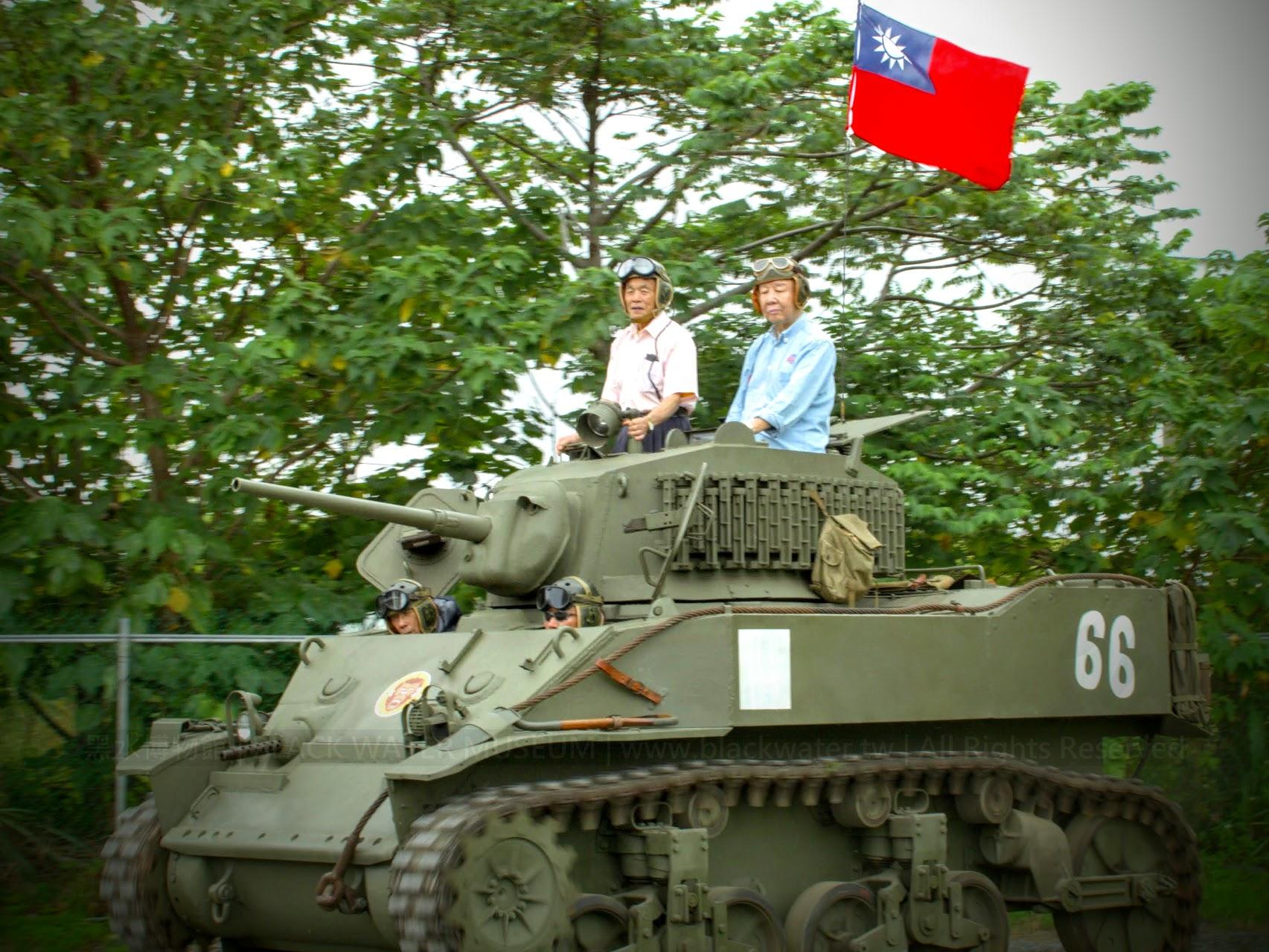
Stuart M5A1 Tank "Miss Mary Lynn" repainted with the livery of Tank No. 66, The man dressed in light blue on the right of the picture is gunner Hsiung Chen-Chiu, participating in the 65th Anniversary of the Battle of Kuningtou.

At approximately 00:00 on October 25, a forward sentry officer from the 21st Battalion, 601st Regiment of the 201st Division (ROC Army) accidentally detonated a landmine. This incident led defenders stationed on the western peninsula of Kinmen to believe that a PLA assault was imminent. ROC defensive positions were rapidly manned, and searchlights—dubbed the "East-West Scarlet Beams"—were activated. These lights exposed an advancing detachment of the PLA 44th Regiment attempting a surprise landing, triggering immediate exchanges of gunfire.

By 00:30, three M5A1 Stuart tanks of the 3rd Tank Regiment's 1st Battalion, 1st Company, stationed near Lungkou (壠口), observed two red flares launched from the sea. They soon came under heavy fire from PLA wooden vessels and shore-mounted machine guns. The tank crews swiftly assumed combat positions and returned fire, thus commencing what would become known as the Battle of Kinmen.

A notable early exchange involved M5A1 Stuart Tank No. 66, which had been immobilised with its turret facing inland. In a moment of instinct, the recruit gunner Hsiung Chen-Chiu (熊震球) mistakenly loaded an armour-piercing round rather than a high-explosive shell. As gunner Hsiung pressed the pedal trigger, the projectile struck the mast of a PLA junk, setting its canvas ablaze and illuminating nearby targets. ROC defenders opened fire with coastal guns, including twelve 57 mm Ordnance QF 6-pounder anti-tank guns, M2 mortars, and four 75 mm M116 howitzers supplied by the United States. According to reported accounts, an ammunition ship was one of the first hit by ROC tank fire, resulting in a fire that burned neighboring landing craft.

==== Escalation and PLA landings ====
By 01:30, over 300 wooden PLA landing boats surged forward in a major assault. ROC Tank No. 66's full crew, including platoon Leader Yang Chan (楊展), sergeant Tang Tsai-Kun (唐在坤), Assistant Driver Tseng Shao-Lin (曾紹林), gunner Hsiung Chen-Chiu, technician Ou Hsiao-Yün (歐曉雲), and Reservist Yao Pu-Hsiung (姚步雄), were all actively engaged. At dawn, the PLA renewed its focus on Tank No. 66 and ROC's 602nd Regiment. Assistant Driver Tseng was killed during intense close-quarters fighting while manning an M1919 .30 calibre machine gun.

At 02:10, PLA artillery stationed on Dabo (大伯), Xiaobo (小伯), Jiaoyu, Dadeng, and Xiaodeng Islands commenced bombardment of ROC positions across Kuan-Ao (官澳), Hsiyüan (西園), Kuanyin Pavilion Hill (觀音亭山) and Kuningtou. However, the 75 mm IJA Type 41 mountain guns and captured 105 mm M101 howitzers of the PLA artillery troops, proved insufficient in range and firepower to provide meaningful support to ground units.

PLA troops made landings along a 10-kilometre stretch from Lungkou (壠口), Housha (後沙) to Kuningtou. The 244th Regiment came ashore between Lantso (蘭厝) and Lungkou, while the vanguard of the 251st Regiment reached Huwei (湖尾鄉). However, subsequent elements of the 251st were struck by artillery, resulting in heavy casualties—approximately one-third of their force.

Lacking unified command and operating under a doctrine of aggressive forward movement, PLA units pushed inland without consolidating their positions. According to captured PLA medic Zhao Baohou (趙保厚), the PLA 244th Regiment suffered significant losses under ROC fire before they could entrench.

==== ROC counterattack and naval movements ====
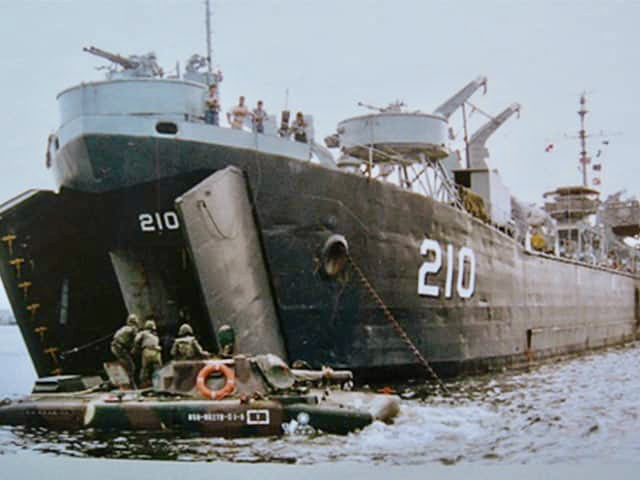
ROCS Chung Yung

At dawn, Commander Liu Tianxiang (劉天祥) of the PLA 251st Regiment reported optimism to Deputy Commander Xiao Feng of the PLA 28th Army, noting that ROC Youth Army units at Kuningtou appeared weak and that numerous prisoners had been taken, some only wearing undergarments. PLA General Ye Fei, based on these reports, believed a PLA victory was imminent.

Simultaneously, ROC Navy vessels moved to intercept the PLA landing fleet. Among them were Minesweeper No. 202, gunboats ROCS Nan An and ROCS Huai Yin, and the tank landing ship ROCS Chung Yung. The latter, ROCS Chung Yung, originally headed to Dinghai in Zhejiang for illicit sugar trade, was reassigned to transport ROC's 19th Army. Delays and poor weather caused Chung Yung to remain near Kinmen and participate in the engagement by using Bofors 40 mm and 20 mm autocannons against wooden boats.

At 04:30, the ROC 18th Army's 118th Division (less the 352nd Regiment) joined with garrison forces to launch a three-pronged counterattack. The 14th Division, minus the 40th Regiment, advanced from Houpu (後埔) under coordinated efforts by Generals Liu Yün-Han (劉雲瀚) and Shen Hsiang-Kuei (沈向奎). Mortar units from the 40th Division provided fire support, while reserve tank platoons were held at Chiunglin.

==== Air superiority and joint operations ====
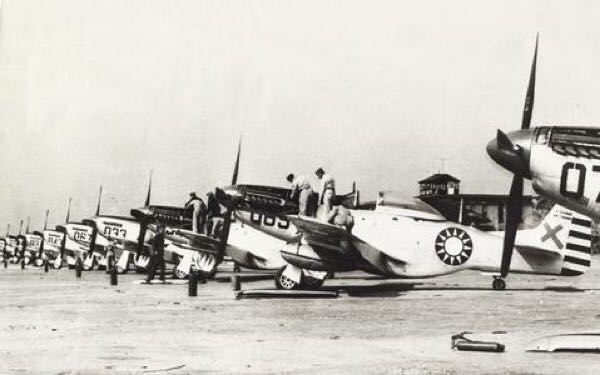
Republic of China Air Force P-51 Mustangs lined up. During the Battle of Guningtou, these aircraft conducted ground attack missions against PLA landing forces, contributing significantly to the Nationalist victory.

At 08:00, the ROCAF commenced sustained bombing and strafing operations against PLA forces and abandoned vessels. By dusk, the command staff of the 12th Army Corps had arrived off southern Kinmen aboard the MV Min Yü (民裕輪), where General Hu Lien was waiting ashore. However, unfamiliarity with the coastline and rough seas prevented the staff from disembarking immediately.

Of the three PLA regiments that landed on the first day, only one battalion on the western shore failed to reach its intended position. By daybreak, the PLA troops—now fully exposed—came under heavy, coordinated attacks from ROC forces by air, land, and sea.

Notably, the ROC Army's 45th Division, which had served as a security unit for the Chinese Nationalist Air Forces during the Second Sino-Japanese War, was equipped with advanced air liaison systems. Besides the division commander, Lao Sheng-huan (勞聲寰), who had been a theory instructor in forward air control doctrines, many of his subordinate officers had received Forward Air Controller (FAC) training from the USAAF during the same period. Lao successfully coordinated with 18 ROCAF P-51 Mustang fighter aircraft based in Taiwan. His FAC team directed the Mustangs to target PLA landing craft, resulting in the destruction of over 100 vessels. This action became a rare but highly effective tri-service operation by ROC forces during the Chinese Civil War.

==== Collapse of the PLA landing effort ====
As PLA vessels were caught in shallow waters from the low tide, they became easy targets for ROC air and naval forces. No second wave reinforcements ever made it ashore. Regimental Leader Hsing Yung-Sheng (邢永生) of the PLA 244th Regiment, although gravely wounded, continued to lead his unit until it was nearly annihilated by noon.

The PLA 253rd Regiment was pushed back from Kuanyin Pavilion Hill and Huwei Heights, and Regimental leader Liu Tien-Hsiang (劉天祥) of the PLA 251st Regiment fought until 15:00, incurring roughly 1,000 casualties. Some surviving troops regrouped with the PLA 253rd at Kuningtou. A detachment of the PLA 251st Regiment held their ground through seven ROC assaults before retreating. The PLA 253rd Regiment also resisted multiple counterattacks.

ROC Army Colonel Lee Kuang-Chien (李光前) of the 42nd Regiment, 14th Division, was killed while leading an assault on Lintsu (林厝).

Realising the dire situation, the PLA's 10th Corps attempted to send reinforcements but could gather enough transport for only four companies. The ROC's overwhelming control of the air and sea caused additional reinforcements to be deemed impossible.

=== 26 October 1949 ===
At approximately 03:00 on 26 October, an estimated 1,000 troops—comprising four companies from the PLA 246th Regiment and elements of the PLA 85th Division—attempted a second wave of landings at Huwei and Kuningtou to reinforce embattled PLA units already ashore. However, heavy winds and choppy seas dispersed the landing craft, and only ten platoons successfully made landfall. Their approach was compromised by frequent illumination flare drops from ROCAF C-47 transport aircraft throughout the night, significantly diminishing the PLA's advantage in stealthy night operations.

The reinforcements were detected before reaching the shore and immediately came under ROC fire. Forced into disorganised mobile combat, they fought while withdrawing inland. At dawn, the surviving companies of the PLA 246th Regiment managed to break through ROC encirclement and linked up with PLA troops still holding out in the town of Kuningtou.

At 06:30, the ROC 118th Division launched a coordinated counteroffensive from the northern coastline at Putou toward PLA positions around Lintsu and Kuningtou. Urban fighting quickly erupted in the narrow streets and alleyways of Kuningtou, leading to intense house-to-house combat. Despite fierce resistance, ROC troops, supported by P-47 fighter-bombers and B-24 heavy bombers of the ROC Air Force, retook Lintsu by midday and Nanshan (南山) by 15:00. Remaining PLA forces began retreating to the northern coastline but were unable to locate boats and instead attempted to escape into the mountainous southeast.

Meanwhile, at 10:00, General Hu Lien arrived at Shuitou (水頭) pier between Greater Kinmen and Lesser Kinmen aboard a tank landing ship. After meeting with senior commanders including Tang Enbo and Luo Zhuoying, Hu proceeded to the Hunan Heights (湖南高地) to oversee deployment adjustments. Learning the gravity of the situation from General Kao Kuei-yuan—then leading combat on the front—Hu Lien assumed direct command of the ROC 118th and 25th Armies without delay. He personally coordinated with the commanders of the ROC 54th, 352nd, 353rd, and 354th Regiments, reinvigorating frontline morale. By nightfall, ROC forces had completed an encirclement of Kuningtou Village.

The ROC 118th Division's commander, Major General Lee Shu-Lan (李樹蘭), reorganised the assault by assigning the ROC 353rd Regiment to relieve the ROC 352nd Regiment. Supported by Stuart tanks, the ROC forces pushed further into Kuningtou. The battle continued into the night, culminating around 22:00 when PLA remnants attempted a breakout under the cover of darkness. Unable to locate evacuation vessels, they turned inland toward the mountainous terrain to the southeast.

=== 27 October 1949 ===
By the early morning of 27 October, surviving People's Liberation Army forces had exhausted their food and ammunition supplies. Over 1,300 troops, many of whom had landed the previous day as reinforcements, retreated to the beaches beneath the cliffs north of Kuningtou. At around midnight, they were discovered by Republic of China forces, who launched a concentrated four-hour assault. More than 400 PLA soldiers were killed, and the remaining 900 surrendered en masse by 10:00.

Despite the collapse of the main PLA force, additional reinforcements continued to arrive. At 03:00, a motor launch carrying around 30 men from the 3rd Company, 259th Regiment of the PLA, landed on the northern shore, but all were promptly captured. That morning, ROC forces had already secured Kuningtou village, but further PLA units—stranded from the previous night's failed reinforcement attempt—were found hiding along the northern coast and also surrendered after being ordered to lay down arms.

At 09:30, Major General Lee Shu-Lan reported the complete success directly to General Hu Lien. Later that day, the ROC Southeast Military and Political Director Chen Cheng arrived at Kinmen by air, conducted an inspection of Kinmen and visited the front lines. While returning, his convoy encountered over 100 PLA troops who emerged from trenches and surrendered in orderly fashion.

By the afternoon, remaining PLA units near Shuangju Hill (雙乳山) were surrounded and forced to surrender. This engagement, occurring at approximately 16:00, marked the end of major combat operations on Kinmen.

=== 28 October 1949 ===
The battle officially concluded on 28 October as remaining PLA forces, having exhausted all resources, surrendered or were captured. Regimental leader Sun Yü-Hsiu (孫玉秀) of the PLA 246th Regiment was wounded and committed suicide. Sporadic fighting continued briefly, but resistance had effectively ended.

Regimental leader Hsu Po (徐博) of the PLA 253rd Regiment, who had fled into the mountainous interior of Kinmen following the collapse of organised resistance, remained at large for over 100 days. He was eventually discovered and captured in February 1950, after surviving in a cave near Mount Taiwu (太武山) by foraging for food. Hsu Po is believed to have been the last PLA combatant captured during the Battle of Kinmen. Following his capture, he was detained at the Neihu Concentration Facility (內湖集中營) in Taipei. According to PRC accounts, Hsu Po was executed by ROC authorities, although more recent historical interpretations suggest he may have died during a hunger strike.

== Aftermath ==
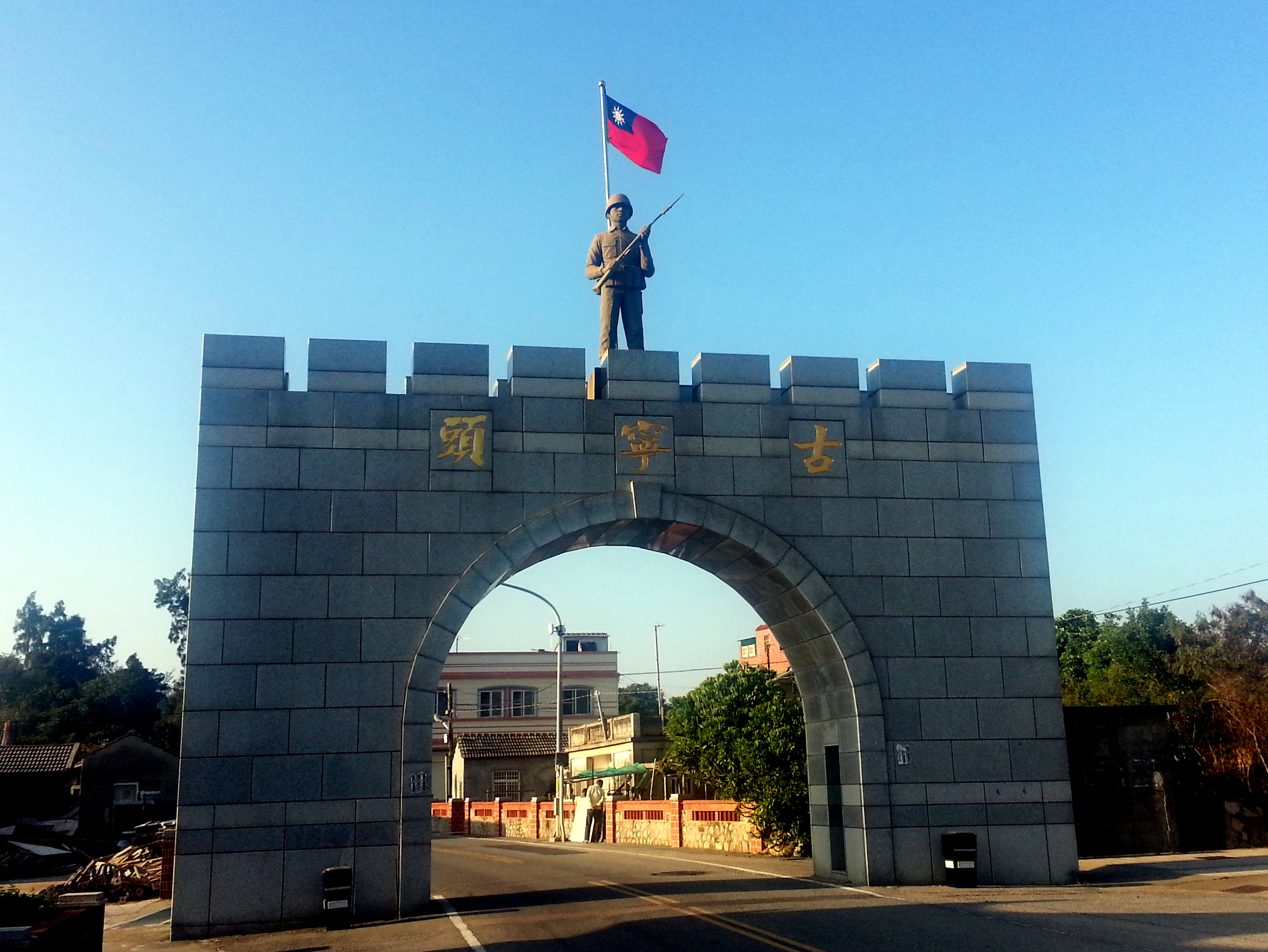
Battle of Guningtou memorial arch

The defeat at Kuningtou marked a significant setback for the People's Liberation Army. In the aftermath, PLA General Ye Fei submitted a written apology to Mao Zedong, accepting responsibility for the failure and requesting punishment. Ye attributed the defeat to three main factors: the shortage of landing vessels, the inability to properly secure beachheads, and the absence of a unified command overseeing the three regiments in the initial landing wave. However, as Ye Fei was one of Mao's most trusted and favoured generals, no disciplinary action was taken against him.

For the Republic of China (ROC) Armed Forces—accustomed to a series of defeats during the Chinese Civil War—the victory at Kuningtou provided a crucial morale boost. Strategically, the battle halted the PLA's momentum toward an invasion of Taiwan. Following the outbreak of the Korean War in 1950, and the subsequent signing of the Sino-American Mutual Defense Treaty (中美共同防禦條約) in 1954, the Communist Party's plans for invading Taiwan were indefinitely postponed.

In the People's Republic of China, the Battle of Kuningtou received limited public attention for decades. It was not until the early 21st century that the battle began to receive wider acknowledgement in the mainland, when articles analysing the reasons for the defeat were published more openly. Military analysts cited several contributing factors: lack of experience in amphibious operations, inadequate landing craft, absence of armoured support, weak defensive capabilities, insufficient intelligence services, and a general lack of international recognition.

Additionally, the PLA had anticipated a swift victory within a single day of fighting and therefore failed to supply the first wave with sufficient ammunition, rations, and water. This logistical shortfall persisted, albeit to a lesser extent, during the second day of combat operations.

In Taiwan, the battle is regarded as a turning point and foundational event shaping the modern status quo between Taiwan and mainland China.

=== Republic of China casualties ===
The ROC Southeast Military and Political Office held a press conference stating that ROC casualties were fewer than 3,000. According to official ROC military history, the ROC suffered 1,267 killed and 1,982 wounded, for a total of 3,249 casualties. The highest-ranking ROC officer killed in action was Colonel Lee Kuang-Chien, commander of the 42nd Regiment, 14th Division, under the 19th Army.

Regarding the number of ROC troops killed in action, the original official PLA battle report included a significantly exaggerated claim, stating that "more than 9,000 ROC troops were killed or wounded during the fighting on Kinmen." However, more recent reports published in mainland China since the 21st century largely omit discussion of ROC casualties.

Most of the ROC personnel killed during the battle were later interred at the Taiwushan Veterans Cemetery (金門太武山軍人公墓), which was established in 1953 on the slopes of Mount Taiwu.

=== People's Liberation Army casualties ===
The Battle of Kuningtou saw three waves of amphibious assaults by the People's Liberation Army (PLA). Of the 9,086 troops landed (including the 350 non-combat personnel), the PLA also claimed: "the vast majority were killed in action", marking one of the most significant losses for the PLA during the Second Chinese Civil War.

- The first wave, on the night of 24 October, included the 244th Regiment of the 82nd Division and the 251st Regiment of the 84th Division, both under the PLA 28th Army, as well as the 253rd Regiment of the 85th Division under the 29th Army, and the 3rd Battalion of the 246th Regiment (82nd Division). Altogether, this force comprised ten full infantry battalions.
- The second wave, which landed on the night of 25 October, included the 2nd Company of the 1st Battalion of the 246th Regiment, two machine-gun and artillery platoons, and over thirty hand-picked combat veterans drawn from the same regiment—totalling more than 300 personnel. It also involved over 200 troops from the 3rd Battalion of the 259th Regiment, 87th Division (29th Army), but only around 100 of them successfully reached the island.
- The third wave arrived on the night of 26 October and consisted of more than 30 troops from the 2nd Company of the 1st Battalion, 259th Regiment. Their primary mission was to assist in evacuating wounded personnel from the battlefield. In total, 9,086 personnel took part in the operation, including approximately 350 boat operators and civilian porters.

The Chinese Communist Party has long maintained that, of the 9,086-strong landing force, aside from a small number of troops taken prisoner, nearly all the remainder "perished heroically" in battle. The Communist narrative did not mention the fate of the civilian participants, including boatmen and porters.

In contrast, official records from the Republic of China assert that a total of 3,873 PLA officers and enlisted personnel were killed during the fighting on Kinmen, while a larger number—7,364—were captured alive, either wounded or uninjured. This figure of 7,364 also included slightly more than 1,000 civilian boatmen and porters.

The true figures remained disputed until the 2000s, when non-government media in mainland China began to acknowledge that "at least 5,175 PLA personnel were captured during the campaign, and a minimum of 50 were missing in action," a claim more closely aligned with the ROC account. This evolution reflects the broader political divide and the conflicting wartime narratives between the two sides.

== People's Liberation Army prisoners of war ==
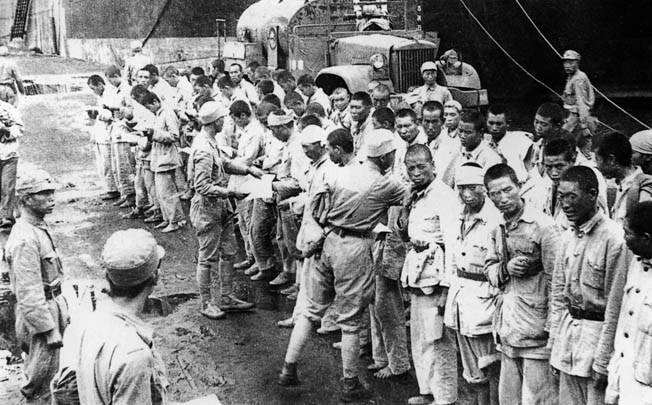
Captured PLA soldiers from the Battle of Kuningtou being processed by ROC forces. Over 5,000 PLA troops were taken prisoner following the failed Communist landing operation.

According to records from the Republic of China (ROC) military, a total of 7,364 PLA troops and civilian workers were captured during the Battle of Kuningtou. Specific figures included 1,495 captured by the 201st Division, 3,204 by the 118th Division, 735 by the 11th Division, 995 by the 18th Division, and 935 by the 14th Division. In his memoir Recollections of Kinmen, General Hu Lien further claimed that more than 1,000 of those captured were civilian boatmen and porters.

Among the captured personnel, civilian non-combatants, including boatmen and porters, were typically given the option of returning to mainland China or settling in Taiwan or on Kinmen. Those who remained often found employment in Taiwan's fishing industry.

=== Direct reintegration into the ROC Armed Forces ===
In some cases, captured PLA soldiers were found to have previously served in the ROC Armed Forces, particularly those who had voluntarily joined the Nationalist forces during earlier mainland campaigns but were later captured and conscripted into the PLA. Many of these individuals were soldiers or non-commissioned officers who had served in elite units, such as the 12th Army Corps during the Battle of Hsupeng, as professional soldiers or technicians. In some instances, a few had only recently been captured in Fujian just months or even weeks earlier.

If their former unit could be verified, or they were personally recognised by their original ROC commanding officers, they were issued new uniforms, promptly reintegrated into active service between 25 and 27 October 1949 to replace battle casualties, and equipped with ammunition and service firearms to replace their former PLA weapons. These individuals bypassed the Rehabilitation Camp process entirely and continued to serve in their original or newly-assigned units until discharge.

Although a number of these directly reintegrated personnel lost their lives during subsequent combat operations, they were not included in the original figure of 1,267 KIA that was officially reported by ROC authorities immediately after the battle. Nevertheless, they were ultimately honoured and buried alongside their fallen ROC comrades at the Taiwushan Cemetery when it was established in 1953.

=== Rehabilitation camps ===
In contrast, a larger number of captured PLA personnel had no prior service with the ROC military. Additionally, there were captives who had been conscripted into the Nationalist forces on the mainland by press gangs before they joined the PLA following their capture. In most cases, either their original identities could not be verified by the ROC forces, or they were unwilling to disclose their prior service with the Nationalists.

As a result, the majority of able-bodied or lightly-wounded PLA combat personnel were interned at the Kan-Cheng Barracks (干城營房) in Taichung. After several months of training in Rehabilitation Camps (新生訓練營), they were formally reassigned and integrated into the ROC Armed Forces. Some senior PLA officers, such as Liu Tien-Hsiang (劉天祥), commander of the PLA 251st Regiment, were reportedly air lifted to Taiwan aboard ROCAF transport aircraft. According to some accounts, Liu later died during a hunger strike.

=== Repatriation to mainland ===
Most higher-ranking PLA officers and Chinese Communist Party cadres were repatriated to mainland China in several organised batches during 1950, following initial screening at the Neihu Concentration Facility (內湖集中營) in Taipei. Some older soldiers, seriously wounded personnel, and captives who insisted on returning were also repatriated, as ROC authorities deemed them of limited military value. The repatriated individuals were those who survived the detention process at Neihu, excluding those who had been executed or killed themselves during captivity. Furthermore, contrary to modern understanding, "older" then typically referred to individuals aged 31 or 32 and above although some flexibility was occasionally granted to better-educated PLA prisoners.

The repatriations took place in March, July, and December 1950, with some groups routed via offshore islands such as the Tachen Islands and the Matsu Islands, before reaching the mainland coast of Fujian. In total, approximately 900 individuals were returned under ROC custody.

Upon their return, repatriated prisoners were initially received by local PLA or militia units and temporarily housed in reception centres known as Repatriated Prisoner Training Units (归俘集训队) in Hangzhou, Fuzhou, and Nanking. However, rather than being reintegrated, most underwent a prolonged process of ideological re-education, political screening, and self-criticism, structured into three stages:

1. Political indoctrination, including "spirit and character" (气节) education;
2. Self-reflection, confession, and mutual denunciation;
3. Categorisation and punitive action based on individual behaviour.

Returnees were expected to demonstrate absolute loyalty to the CCP and denounce both themselves and others for alleged ideological failings or cooperation with enemy forces while in captivity. That environment fostered a culture of mutual accusation, where prisoners often sought to protect themselves by implicating others.

Most lower-ranking "older" soldiers or seriously wounded personnel were given non-honourable discharges and faced long-term hardship and social isolation, lasting well into the post–Cultural Revolution era. Many seriously wounded returnees died within a few years for a lack of medical care. Some individuals, particularly former officers, were sentenced to prison terms or executed regardless of prior battlefield service or merit.

Notable cases include:

- Lee Tzu-Yüan (李子元), battalion commander of the PLA 253rd Regiment, who surrendered after exhausting his ammunition during the battle. Although respected by fellow soldiers, he was executed in 1951 for "betrayal of the revolution".
- Tou Yung-Lee (竇永禮), deputy battalion commander in the 253rd Regiment and a veteran of the Second Sino-Japanese War, classified as a "third-degree disabled" because of war injuries, was similarly executed after accusations of collaboration while he was in captivity.

The Chinese Communist Party distinguished sharply between enemy POWs and its own captured personnel. While enemy POWs could be treated leniently, captured Communist troops were often regarded as traitors or political liabilities. Although a small number of returnees were eventually reinstated or spared, the vast majority endured significant hardship, surveillance, or permanent social stigma.

It was not until after the Cultural Revolution and the era of economic reforms that many of those individuals were posthumously rehabilitated or politically vindicated. By that time, however, most had already passed away or spent decades under informal punishment.

=== Executions of high-profile PLA personnel ===
Some higher-ranking PLA officers and Political Commissars were executed by ROC authorities during or after the screening process at the Neihu Concentration Facility in Taipei. Executions were generally limited to individuals who fell into one or more of the following categories:

- Former ROC commissioned officers who had defected to the PLA, bringing with them the units they had commanded during earlier mainland campaigns;
- Individuals for whom clear evidence existed of participation in the execution of ROC intelligence personnel during the civil war;
- Political operatives or individuals formally recorded by the ROC government as significant political adversaries.

Such cases were reviewed by military tribunals and remained relatively few compared to the broader number of prisoners processed through Neihu.

A particularly unusual case was that of Chen Lihua, a Chinese Communist Party member from Meixian, Guangdong Province. Chen had served as Political Commissar of the 253rd Regiment, 85th Division, 29th Army of the PLA. During the Battle of Kinmen on 25 October 1949, he managed to conceal his identity and, under the alias Chen Kaizhong (陳開中), infiltrated the ROC forces.

Relying on his educational background, he was admitted to the 24th intake of the Chinese Military Academy and later entered service with the ROC National Security Bureau, eventually attaining the rank of Colonel.

Beginning in 1969, Chen Lihua sought to re-establish contact with mainland Chinese Communist organisations through his former comrade and fellow captive, Chen Jui-Lin (陳瑞粦), via then British-controlled Hong Kong. However, Chen never successfully made contact; he was exposed shortly after dispatching a courier to initiate communication. In 1981, following a report by Chen Jui-Lin, Chen Lihua was arrested, convicted of espionage, and sentenced to death. He was executed by ROCMP firing squad on 11 November 1981.

Although executed as a clandestine infiltrator, Chen Lihua was never posthumously recognised as a Revolutionary Martyr (革命烈士) by the Chinese Communist Party. In an ironic historical twist, however, following Taiwan's democratisation, some transitional justice advocacy groups attempted to assist Chen Lihua's descendants in Taiwan and expressed commemorative sentiments towards him personally.

=== Integration and later developments in Taiwan ===
It is undeniable that a number of those who remained in Taiwan experienced discrimination because of their past service in the PLA and their prior association with the Rehabilitation Camps. They faced limited social mobility in the early decades following the war. Even those who had bypassed the Rehabilitation Camp process and were directly reintegrated into the ROC Armed Forces were not immune to the broader difficulties faced by mainland-born ROC soldiers, including challenges in finding marriage partners and securing a respectable livelihood within Taiwanese society after discharge.

Yet, in contrast to those who were repatriated, many of the PLA personnel who remained in Taiwan were officially designated by mainland Chinese authorities as "missing in action" (失蹤人員) following the Battle of Kinmen. Their families on the mainland were awarded pensions and allowances. Although the benefits were not fully comparable to those given to families of individuals officially recognised as having "heroically perished" (英勇牺牲), they were considerably better than the treatment received by families of repatriated prisoners. In later decades, these families also benefited from intangible social advantages associated with having relatives who were symbolically linked to the cause of national reunification.

Meanwhile, in the years following the implementation of the Three Links and the expansion of cross-strait exchanges, some of these former POWs who had settled in Taiwan returned to the mainland as businessmen. In several cases, they were embraced by Mainland Chinese authorities for their symbolic value in promoting reunification efforts. A few even became members of the Chinese People's Political Consultative Conference (CPPCC) after relocating to the mainland. Over time, it also became common for some of these former POWs, who had been in their early twenties at the time of capture, to marry younger mainland Chinese women later in life, particularly after returning to the mainland during the period of renewed cross-strait exchanges.

Among those who had insisted on repatriation in 1950 but survived to witness these later developments, there emerged a complex mix of emotions. Some felt a sense of irony or bitterness and reflected on the shifting political narratives and the contrasting fates of their comrades who had remained behind and those who had returned to the mainland decades earlier.

== Legacy ==
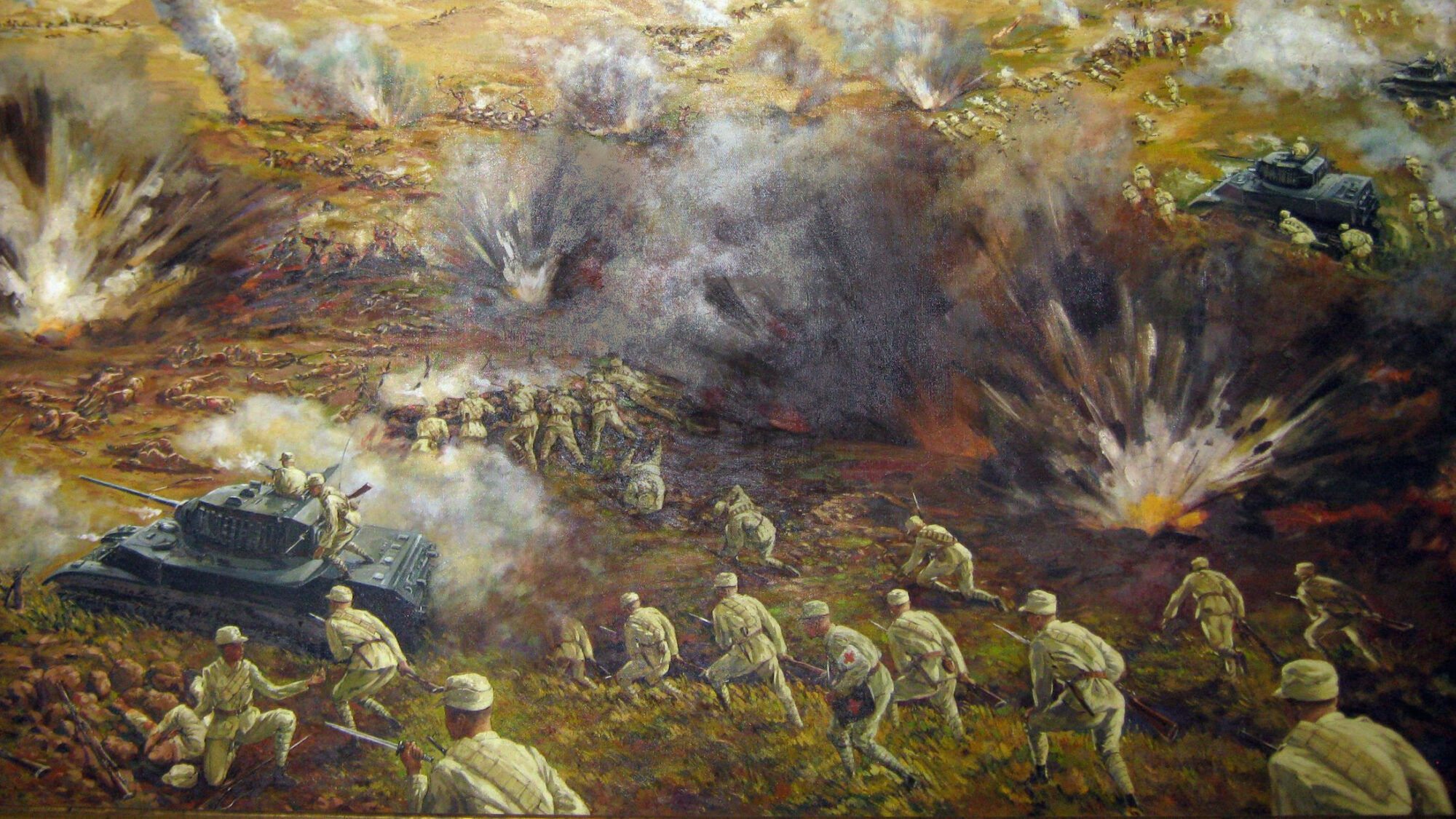
Depiction of the Battle of Guningtou (October 1949), showing Nationalist forces repelling waves of PLA troops amid heavy artillery fire. The defense featured intense close-quarter combat and tank support from ROC M5A1 Stuart tanks.

In Taiwan, the battle became popularly known as the "Great Victory at Kuningtou" (古寧頭大捷; Gǔ níng tóu dàjié). Interpretations of the battle's significance have evolved over time. Government publications and academic studies frequently credited the outcome to Chiang Kai-shek's strategic foresight and the Kuomintang's military preparedness. While many accounts acknowledge tactical missteps by the PLA, recent perspectives also highlight the role of unexpected events—such as the accidental detonation of a landmine and the sudden reactivation of a stalled tank—as pivotal factors in the ROC's success.

Despite differing narratives, most analyses concur in viewing the battle as a testament to the importance of readiness, cohesion, and tactical flexibility in warfare.

=== Postwar development and strategic role of Kinmen ===
Following the Battle of Kuningtou, the ROC government under General Hu Lien (胡璉) undertook extensive efforts to transform Kinmen into a heavily fortified frontier against potential Communist invasion. During his tenure as both Commander of the Kinmen Defense Command (金門防衛指揮部) and Chairman of Fuchien Province, Hu Lien spearheaded a wide range of initiatives to stabilise and develop the island. These included large-scale afforestation projects, the construction of extensive road networks such as the Central Highway (later renamed Boyu Road), and significant improvements to local water retention infrastructure.

In addition to environmental and civil engineering efforts, Hu Lien prioritised education and the cultivation of local talent, overseeing the expansion of schools and encouraging military units to contribute to community development. One notable achievement was the establishment of Kinmen Kaoliang liquor production, which became a vital source of financial revenue for sustaining both military and civilian projects on the island.

Strategically, Kinmen was positioned not only as a key defensive stronghold to deter Communist amphibious assaults but also as a potential forward base for any future campaign aimed at "Retaking the Mainland." Throughout the 1950s and 1960s, Kinmen served as a symbolic and operational outpost for the ROC's broader political and military ambitions across the Taiwan Strait.

=== Kuningtou Battle Museum ===
In 1984, the soldiers who fought and fell during the battle were formally commemorated with the establishment of the Kuningtou Battle Museum. The M5A1 tanks used in the conflict were preserved and placed on display outside the museum as part of the memorial.

=== The Bear of Kinmen ===
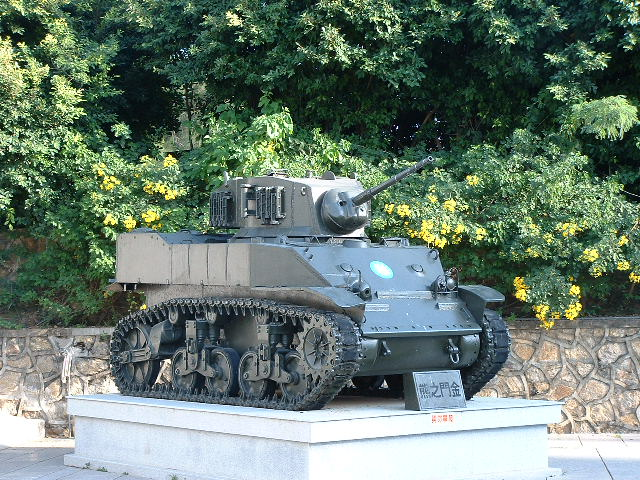
ROC M5A1 tank with placard reading "The Bear of Kinmen"

The M5A1 light tanks deployed by ROC forces on Kinmen played a decisive role in countering the initial human wave attacks launched by PLA infantry during the landings. In several instances, ROC tank crews, having expended all available ammunition, used their vehicles as makeshift road rollers, crushing attacking PLA troops at close range.

The effectiveness and resilience demonstrated by these tanks led ROC troops to nickname the M5A1 the "Bear of Kinmen" (金門之熊). Among the most notable engagements occurred at Lungkou (壟口), where the PLA's 244th Regiment came ashore and encountered three tanks—#64, #65, and #66—of the 1st Platoon, 3rd Company, 1st Battalion, ROC 3rd Tank Regiment. Notably, Tank #66 had broken down on the beach the previous evening during company exercises. The remaining two tanks were ordered to remain in place and provide protection until repairs could be completed.

=== National holiday ===
In May 2025, the Legislative Yuan made October 25 a national holiday in Taiwan, celebrating the anniversary of the Battle of Guningtou in conjunction with the Retrocession Day.

== See also ==
- Retreat of the government of the Republic of China to Taiwan
- Outline of the Chinese Civil War
- Outline of the military history of the People's Republic of China
- National Revolutionary Army
- History of the People's Liberation Army
- Kuningtou War Museum
