= USS LST-574 =

LST-542-class tank landing ship

Coordinates: 22.1037500°N 120.6891944°E

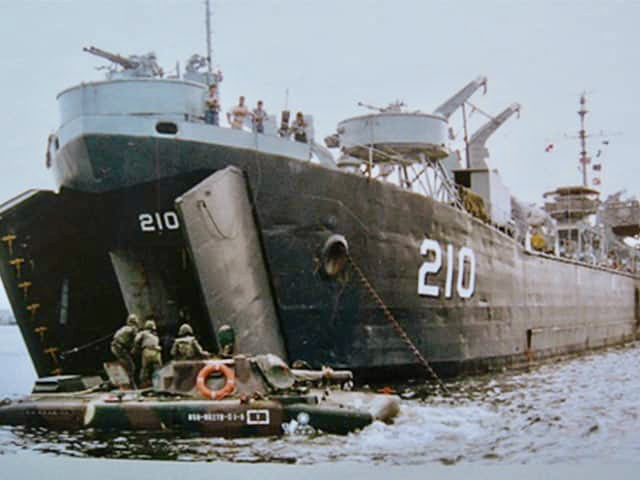
- ROCS Chung Yung

History

United States
- Name: LST-574
- Builder: Missouri Valley Bridge and Iron Co., Evansville
- Laid down: 16 April 1944
- Launched: 5 June 1944
- Commissioned: 26 June 1944
- Decommissioned: 17 June 1946
- Stricken: 3 July 1946
- Identification: Callsign: NEWU
- Honors and awards: See Awards
- Fate: Sold to commercial service, 1947

Taiwan
- Name: Chung Yung; (中榮)
- Acquired: 1 May 1949
- Commissioned: 1 May 1949
- Decommissioned: 16 October 1997
- Identification: Hull number: LST-210
- Fate: Sunk as artificial reef, 10 November 2002

General characteristics
- Class & type: LST-542-class tank landing ship
- Displacement: 1,625 long tons (1,651 t) light; 4,080 long tons (4,145 t) full
- Length: 328 ft (100 m)
- Beam: 50 ft (15 m)
- Draft: Unloaded : 2 ft 4 in (0.71 m) forward; 7 ft 6 in (2.29 m) aft; Loaded : 8 ft 2 in (2.49 m) forward; 14 ft 1 in (4.29 m) aft
- Propulsion: 2 × General Motors 12-567 diesel engines, two shafts, twin rudders
- Speed: 12 knots (22 km/h; 14 mph)
- Boats & landing craft carried: 2 × LCVPs
- Troops: 16 officers, 147 enlisted men
- Complement: 7 officers, 104 enlisted men
- Armament: 8 × 40 mm guns; 12 × 20 mm guns

USS LST-574 was a LST-542-class tank landing ship in the United States Navy during World War II. Commissioned in 1944, she participated in some of the last amphibious landings of the war. Following World War II, she served in China and the occupation of Japan before being decommissioned in 1946. She was transferred to the Republic of China Navy in 1949 as ROCS Chung Yung (LST-210) and participated in the final phases of the Chinese Civil War. She was decommissioned again in 1997 and sunk as an artificial reef in 2002.

== Construction ==
LST-574 was laid down on 16 April 1944 at the Missouri Valley Bridge and Iron Company in Evansville, Indiana. She was launched on 5 June 1944 and commissioned on 26 June 1944.

== Service in the United States Navy ==
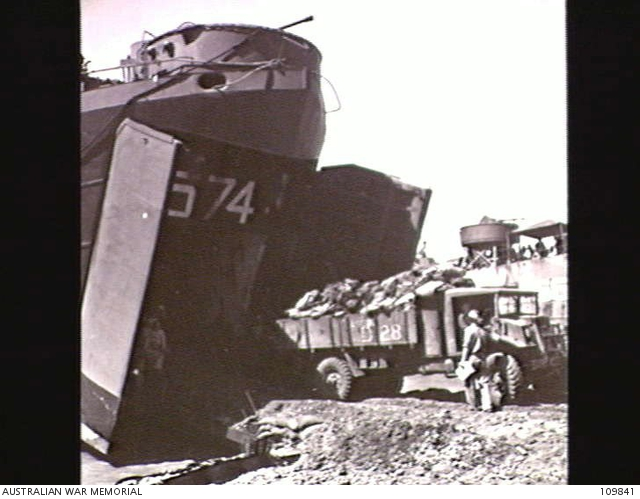
LST-574 on 19 June 1945

During World War II, LST-574 was assigned to the Asiatic-Pacific theater. She participated in the Leyte landings from 5 to 18 November 1944. In 1945, she took part in the Lingayen Gulf landings from 4 to 18 January and Mindanao Island landing from 10 to 11 March. She was assigned to China and the occupation of Japan from 2 September 1945 to 25 May 1946.

She was decommissioned on 17 June 1946 and struck from the Naval Register on 3 July 1946. She was sold to the Philippines for commercial service on 5 November 1947 but was later resold to the Republic of China in March 1949 and renamed Chung Yung (LST-210).

== Service in the Republic of China Navy ==
Chung Yung participated in the Battle of Guningtou in October 1949, where she used her significant firepower (2x2 40mm guns, 6x1 40mm guns, 8x1 20mm guns) to destroy beached PLA landing craft. The ship was scheduled to leave a day before the battle after offloading its cargo, but she remained, officially due to "bad weather". The real reason for why the ship remained in the area was that it was running a side business of smuggling brown sugar from Taiwan island in exchange for peanut oil. However, there was not enough peanut oil on the whole island for the deal, so the ship was forced to stay for another day while waiting for more peanut oil to be produced, making it the accidental hero of the battle.

Chung Yung was decommissioned on 16 October 1997 and sunk as an artificial reef on 10 November 2002 off Pingtung County.

In 2003, underwater observations by Wu Musheng and others on 18 September and 3 December found that the ship was completely seated on the seabed. There were cement block reefs on the bow and stern, and the electric pole reefs in the cabin were also intact and undamaged. No discarded fishing nets were found in the reef. They noticed large numbers of marine life living around the reef.

There are many medium and large benthic fishes gathered in the reef area, and migratory fish schools have also been found. Some local fishermen formed a "Warship Reef Area Protection Patrol Team" to protect the integrity of the reef and prevent illegal fishing practices, achieving good results and receiving the support of other fishermen.

== Awards ==
LST-574 has received the following awards:

- China Service Medal (extended)
- American Campaign Medal
- Asiatic-Pacific Campaign Medal (3 battle stars)
- World War II Victory Medal
- Navy Occupation Service Medal (with Asia clasp)
- Philippines Presidential Unit Citation
- Philippines Liberation Medal (2 battle stars)

== Sources ==
- United States. Dept. of the Treasury (1962). Treasury Decisions Under the Customs, Internal Revenue, Industrial Alcohol, Narcotic and Other Laws, Volume 97. U.S. Government Printing Office.
- Moore, Capt. John (1984). Jane's Fighting Ships 1984-85. Jane's Information Group. ISBN 978-0710607959.
- Saunders, Stephen (2009). Jane's Fighting Ships 2009-2010. Jane's Information Group. ISBN 978-0710628886.
- Fairplay International Shipping Journal Volume 222. United Kingdom: Fairplay Publishing Limited. 1967.
