= Xiaodeng Island =

Bedrock island in Xiamen Bay, Fujian, China

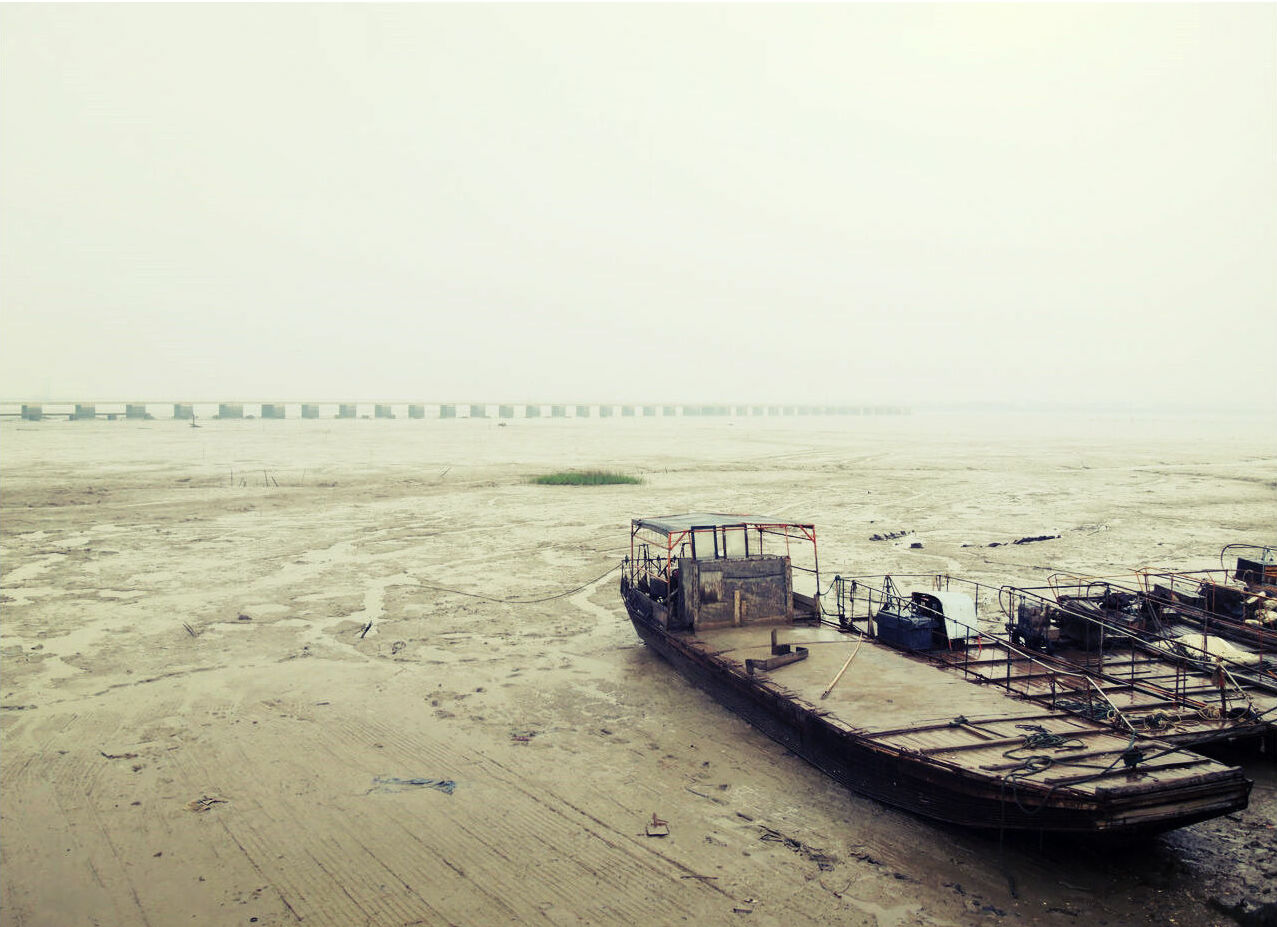
- Photos of the island in 2014
- Interactive map of Xiaodeng Island

Geography
- Location: Fujian Province
- Coordinates: 24.5589°N 118.3837°E
- Archipelago: Dadao Islands
- Area: 0.9671 km^{2} (0.3734 sq mi)
- Coastline: 5.8 km (3.6 mi)
- Highest elevation: 28 m (92 ft)
- Highest point: Saiyueo

Administration
- China
- Community: Fujian Province Xiamen City Xiang'an District Dadeng Street Xiaodeng Community Resident Committee
- Republic of China
- County: R.O.C.Fujian Province Kinmen County

Demographics
- Population: 3,000

Xiaodeng Island, also known as Xiaodeng or Xiaodengbao in ancient times, is a bedrock island located in the southern part of Xiang'an, Xiamen Bay. It covers an area of approximately 0.9671 square kilometers and has an altitude of 28 meters. As of 2008, the population of the island was about 3,000 people. The island was originally located in Kinmen County, Fuchien Province, Republic of China (ROC). After being occupied by the Chinese People's Liberation Army (PLA), it was included in Dadeng Subdistrict, Xiang'an District, Xiamen, Fujian Province, People's Republic of China. There is currently a Xiaodeng Neighborhood Committee, which governs two natural villages, Qianbao and Houbao. However, the ROC considers this island to be a peripheral island of its Kinmen County, just as it considered itself in charge of the villages. The island has complete facilities, with a bridge leading to Dadeng Island and mainland China. However, due to the construction of Xiamen Xiang'an International Airport, the overall facilities on the island will be demolished and relocated.

Xiaodeng Island is rich in seafood, with specialties such as Xiaodeng seaweed and Xiaodeng oysters. There are multiple tourist attractions on the island, and the tourism industry is thriving. Xiaodeng has a long history, starting with the Tang dynasty founded by Hong Dao, the founder of the Hong clan in Xiaodeng. Qiu Kui, a Neo-Confucianism scholar of the Song and Yuan dynasties, was born on the island and later lived there in seclusion; it is also said that the last emperor of the Song dynasty, Zhao Bing, lived on the island when he fled south. Xiaodeng Island also experienced the artillery battle of "August 23" during the shelling of Kinmen, and is known as the "Three Heroic Islands" together with Dadeng Island and Jiaoyu Island.

== History ==
Hong Dao, the ancestor of the Hong clan of Xiaodeng, lived in seclusion on Xiaodeng Island in 1140 and created the name of Dadeng Mountain, which is interpreted as "Dadeng is to fight to be straight up without any hesitation of strategy and foot; the mountain is to be the real accumulation of Taojun and creation", from which the name of Xiaodeng Island comes.

During the Song dynasty, it was rumored that the last emperor, Zhao Bing, lived on Xiaodeng Island during his escape. Due to the delicious taste of the local ostreidae and the fact that they have two more gills than the ordinary oysters, he gave them the name "July Pearl Oysters".

When the Wokou invaded during the Ming dynasty, they plundered and killed the residents of Xiaodeng Island in the second year of Hongwu (1369) and the twenty-fifth year of Jiajing (1546).

During the Second Sino-Japanese War, Xiaodeng Island was bombed and shelled by the Imperial Japanese Armed Forces many times. It often dispatched steamboats to strafe fishermen and villages. In 1938, a 45-member anti-Japanese self-defense group was organized in Xiaodeng Island, and on February 22, 1940, Japanese planes bombed Xiaodeng Island, killing 6 and injuring 4 and collapsing 35 houses. On March 30 of that year, it was bombed again, causing 19 deaths and 8 injuries and the destruction of 50 houses.

At the end of the Chinese Communist Revolution, the battle of Dadeng Island north of Kinmen broke out on October 9, 1949, and Dadeng Island was captured on the 10th. On the 11th, the 851st Regiment of the 84th Division of the 28th People's Liberation Army occupied Xiaodeng Island. In the 1950s and 1970s, high-pitched speakers were installed on Xiaodeng Island, which was used for mainland propaganda against Kinmen. After the Chinese Civil War, Xiaodeng Island was bombed by the Republic of China Air Force on September 22, 1954, because it was near Kinmen. The village on the island was flattened in the artillery battle of "August 23rd" in 1958, killing 34 people. After that, 9 people from the Xiaodeng Island militia battalion were awarded second-class merit and 54 people were awarded third-class merit by the Chinese PLA, and the island was also called "Three Heroic Islands" together with Dadeng and Jiaoyu islands.

=== District history ===
During the Qing dynasty, Xiaodeng Island belonged to Xiaodeng Fort in Xiangfengli, Tongan County, Quanzhou Province. During the Republican period, it belonged to Siming County in 1912 and to Dadong Township, Kinmen County in 1914. After being occupied by the Chinese People's Liberation Army in 1949, it was transferred to Xiaodeng Township in Dadeng District, Nan'an County, Quanzhou City in 1950. In 1958, it belonged to Haiyan Brigade, and in 1965, it was renamed Xiaodeng Brigade and belonged to Dadeng Subdistrict. In 1971, it was returned to Tongan County, and in 1984, it belonged to Dadeng Township and was renamed Xiaodeng Village Committee, with two natural villages under its jurisdiction: Qianbao and Houbao. In 1991, it belonged to Dadeng town, in 2003, it belonged to Xiang'an district, in 2005 it was established as Xiaodeng Community Residents' Committee and belonged to Dadeng Street of Xiang'an District. In 2007, Xiaodeng community was also awarded as "the most beautiful village" in Xiamen. The code of the island in mainland China is 350212000411.

=== Historical figures ===
Multiple historical figures have appeared on Xiaodeng Island:

- Qiu Kui: A scholar of Neo-Confucianism during the Song–Yuan dynasties, born on Xiaodeng Island. After living most of his life in seclusion on Xiaodeng Island, he inherited Zhu Xi's doctrine of science. He has made great achievements and has lectured at the Golden Gate, and has had a great influence on the education of the Jinmin.
- Hong Shunli: A militia hero, he has chased the secret service many times, visited Vietnam and met Mao Zedong 8 times.
- Hong Xiu-fir: Militia hero, the prototype of Haixia in the feature film "Haixia", known as "the contemporary Mu Guiying." He was the mayor of Xiaodeng Township during the artillery battle of "August 23rd" and organized the transportation of ammunition, which was later praised by Zhou Enlai.

== Environment ==
=== Geography ===
Xiaodeng Island is located in Xiamen Bay, approximately 1.4 kilometers northwest of the land, and faces Kinmen across the sea in the south. The island is east–west oriented and resembles a Sleeping Beauty reclining in the blue waves. It covers an area of about 0.9671 square kilometers, has a coastline of about 5.8 kilometers, and the surrounding water depth is 0.2 to 2.7 meters. The topography is high in the east and low in the west, the highest point is Xiyuewei with an altitude of 28 meters. (Note: One said 30.7 meters above sea level。) The northeast side is a steep cliff and the southwest has a slower shore beach; the coastal coast is mainly an earthen cliff, with local bedrock coast, as well as marine erosion cliffs, caves, and gullies.

The geology of the island is similar to Dadeng Island, and it is a bedrock island. The island is located in the Chengbian-Baogai Mountain dynamic metamorphic mixed granite zone near Changle-Nan'ao large fault zone, and the rocks composing the island are Yanshanian igneous rock, with hard bedrock exposed on the north and south-east edges of the island. The engineering geological zoning of the island belongs to the tectonic denudation of bedrock exposed remnant mound subzone; the rest of the area is mostly covered by granite weathering remnants, which belongs to the remnant cover terrace subzone; the mud flats around the island belong to the near-shore intertidal diffuse beach subzone. There is Houbao depression on the island, which is an erosion depression and belongs to the loose rock pore water group, and is a marine accumulation formation.

The intertidal zone of the island is about 3.23 square kilometers, divided into two kinds of rocky beaches and sandy beaches, and the latter is mainly distributed in the south, north, and west of the island, while the former is mainly distributed in the east.

=== Meteorology ===
Xiamen Bay, where Xiaodeng Island is located, has a subtropical maritime climate with an average annual temperature of 21.2 degrees Celsius, 1,853.1 hours of sunshine, 1,374.8 mm of precipitation, 77% of humidity, 2.8 meters per second of wind speed. The climate is warm and hot with moderate humidity. The region has a variable spring climate with many rainy days; a hot summer with high humidity and many typhoons; a dry autumn with little rain; and a dry and cold winter without severe cold. The average annual temperature on the island is 20.9 degrees Celsius, with an average temperature of 13 degrees Celsius in January and 28.2 degrees Celsius in July, with an annual precipitation of 1,059.8 mm.

Hydrology

Xiamen Bay, where Xiaodeng Island is located, is controlled by the tidal wave system of Taiwan Strait and is a resonant tide. According to the data obtained from the survey before the construction of the bridge to Dadeng Island in 2022, the sea tide around the island belongs to the regular half-day tide, and the actual measured maximum up and down tide speed on the north channel of Xiaodeng Island is 56, 76 cm per second, and the average flow speed of the vertical up and down tide is 47, 71 cm per second.

== Culture ==
Xiaodeng Island has a deeper Xianan culture with a unique Hokkien culture style and fishing village culture. The island also has a war culture due to the "August 23rd" artillery battle, and there are many war relics left.

=== Cultural monuments ===
After the death of the Southern Song dynasty, Qiu Kui lived on the island for a long time and left inscribed couplets on Xiaodeng Island such as Chess Game Stone, Fishing Islet Stone, and Le Qiu Stone. The chess game stone is located under the island's tiger halt, more than two feet in length and width, engraved with the words "Ten thousand machines molecular road, a game of smiling back", only "Ten thousand machines divided back" can be identified. A Mazu temple was built on Xiaodeng Island in the Yuan dynasty, which is the earliest Mazu temple in Xiamen and believes in Mazu culture; after the artillery battle of "August 23", there were buildings and relics left on the island such as human defense tunnels, artillery battle sites, and bunkers.

=== Ancient poems and proverbs ===
Zhou Taichu of the Yuan dynasty wrote a poem about Xiaodeng Island, "The boat looks at Xiaodeng Island", which says: "There are homes in the green banyan bushes in the light cloudy mountains and fine sand. Where do the preachers return to?" (Note: A work called "Qishi Yuji Zao Mu Ya", "Qi" is a variant Chinese character.)

In the 18th year of the Daoguang Qing dynasty (1838), King Shang Yu of Ryukyu ascended to the throne, and Daoguang Emperor appointed Lin Hongnian, the cultivator of Hanlin Academy, as the main envoy and Gao Renjian, the editor of Hanlin Academy, as the deputy envoy to the Ryukyu Islands, starting from Xiaodeng Island. Besides, there are some fishing proverbs in Xiaodeng Island, such as: "Qingming xie, Guyu hou", which says that sea crabs and sea horseshoe crabs will migrate to the vicinity of Xiaodeng Island during Qingming and Guyu seasons respectively. "Xiaoshu dagan, Dashu dagan", which says that Dashu and Xiaoshu is the time when horseshoe crabs come and will go to catch the sea.

=== Folk events ===
Every year, on the 12th day of the 4th lunar month of the Chinese calendar, Xiaodeng Island holds the ceremony of the "Horseshoe Crab Festival" to welcome the arrival of horseshoe crabs. Fishermen prepare rich dishes on the front reef near the island and burn incense and worship the horseshoe crabs on one of the reefs called "Burning Gold Reef". There is also the traditional folk activity of tug of war. Before liberation, there was the tradition of holding a tug of war on Xiaodeng Island every year during the Spring Festival and it has continued to this day, and then it became a folk activity in the whole territory of Xiangan District.

== Island construction ==
Xiaodeng Island was included in the pilot project of the old village transformation and new village in 2006, and projects such as drainage ditch, street light, road hardening and sports facilities were built, and then the island was targeted for urbanization, but it has not been realized yet. In 2013, Xiaodeng Island was listed as a key developed island with residents in the Fujian Province Island Protection Plan, and reclamation started between the island and Dadeng Island for the construction of Xiamen Xiangan International Airport from the same year, and in 2022 The island was affected by the noise pollution and exhaust pollution of the future airport, and it was classified as a no-build area in Xiamen City Village Spatial Layout Plan (2018–2035), and the village on the island will be demolished and relocated as a whole within 3 years. (Note: Said to be green space and village construction land.)

=== Transportation ===
==== Land route ====
In 1991, a round-island highway was built on Xiaodeng Island, which was connected to the Xiaodeng Island transportation pier where a battery electric vehicle was available to transport passengers. At present, the main roads on the island are Xiaodeng Road (i.e. Island Ring Road) and Xiaodeng North Road (the main road on the island). Originally there was only a seawall only passable at low tide, in 2017 a temporary steel trestle bridge was built for the Xiamen Xiang'an International Airport area on Dadeng Island, 360 meters long and 6 meters wide, passable for bicycles and motorcycles, and then connected to the rest of the territory through Dadeng Island, and it was planned to build a permanent bridge after the completion of the Xiang'an airport construction. In 2021, the bridge was reinforced because it had reached a service life of 3.5 years of the bridge, and in 2022, it directly started planning the construction of the permanent bridge, which is planned to connect Xiaodeng North Road and the planned Dadeng Island's Huandao Road, 429.3 meters long and 11.5 meters wide, for electric vehicles, electric bicycles and pedestrians to cross the bridge, and it will be completed in December 2024.

In addition to the transportation within the island and with the mainland, a bridge from Kinmen to Xiamen has been planned several times with Taiwan's Kinmen County: in 2004, Taiwan's Kinmen County government studied and evaluated the Jinxia Peace Bridge from Xiaojinmen to Xiamen Qianpu, and then proposed the Jindaeng Bridge from Kinmen Island to Xiamen Dadeng, but it could not be realized due to cross-strait political factors. In 2009, the Jinxia Bridge has planned again, one which started from Wulong Mountain on Kinmen Island and going through Xiaodeng Island to Dadeng Island, with a total length of 10.3 kilometers, which was proposed again by the Mayor of Taipei Ko Wen-je in 2022, but construction has not yet begun.

==== Waterways ====
It is said that Qiu Shi'an built Xiaodeng dock in the late Qing dynasty on Xiaodeng Island, and now Xiaodeng Island belongs to the Dadeng Port area. There are 3 wharves in Xiaodeng Island: traffic wharf, freight wharf, and Houbao deep water wharf, and 2 typhoon shelters in Qianbao and Houbao. Among them, the traffic wharf of Xiaodeng Island was completed in 1977, which is a sudden dike and stone structure with an elevation of 7.85 meters and a length of 21 meters, with one berth for 50-ton ships and a designed annual capacity of 0.5 million tons and 50,000 passengers. In 2009, due to insufficient water depth pier renovation, the berth level was expanded and a floating pier was extended on the southwest side with the following ferry routes:

- Lianhe-Small Dadeng Island ferry: Lianhe ferry terminal in Xindian Town – Small Dadeng Island traffic terminal, distance 1.67 nautical miles, ticket price 12 RMB/person
- Dadeng Island – Xiaodeng Island ferry: Dadeng Island ferry terminal – Xiaodeng Island traffic terminal, distance about 3 nautical miles, ticket price 12 RMB/person

In addition, a ship management station was established in 1985 on Xiaodeng Island, which is responsible for the management, service, and rescue of ships.

==== Airlines ====
Xiaodeng Island with the construction of Xiamen Xiang'an International Airport will build one Doppler weather radar station on the west of the island with a tower height of 30 meters, including one wind-temperature profile radar and configure several meteorological systems, and weather radar and off-site secondary radar will be built in the east, all the above facilities cover an area of about 0.3 hectares and the total land area covers 8.05 hectares.

=== Electricity ===
At the beginning of Xiaodeng Island, diesel generatorss were used to generate electricity. In 1988, Dadeng Township Government invested RMB710,000 to build a submarine communication cable to Dadeng Island, which was completed on August 25 of the same year and connected to a 35kV Dadeng substation to the Xiamen power grid, in 2009, additional submarine cable was installed. In 2014, a new floating wave energy generation device developed by Jimei University was built in the sea of Dadeng Island, and the maximum power generation was 3.6 kilowatts. When General Secretary of the Chinese Communist Party Xi Jinping researched Xiaodeng Island in 2017, he also requested support for projects such as power generation on Xiaodeng Island by making project allocations.

=== Water resources ===
At the beginning of the Song dynasty, water was taken from Xiaodeng Island through a 5-foot deep well named "Beauty Well", and after the 1990s, a new submarine water pipeline was built from Dadeng Island to Xiaodeng Island. On April 12, 1991, the water was connected to the tap, and then the island built a solar-wind desalination unit in 2016, producing 100 tons of tap water per day. There were also breakwaters around the island, initially 1,115 meters long on the south and north sides only, and 1,800 meters long in 1987 due to the construction of the salt farm. However, it was damaged by Typhoon (Dane) in 1999 and rebuilt in 2003, and safety improvements were made in 2019. Now there are wave protection dikes on the seaside, and the waterfront is a stone-piled wave protection wall, and the inner side is a loose artificially excavated breeding pond. There is also a channel area on the northwest side of Xiaodeng Island, 4 to 12 meters deep and in 2006, the tide level wave measurement system was installed in the sea of Xiaodeng Island.

=== Telecommunications ===
Before 1971, a wired broadcasting station was built in Xiaodeng Island and a small number of tweeters were installed. In August 1974, the broadcasting station was expanded into a front broadcasting station in Xiaodeng Island and put into use in May of the following year, equipped with 1 set of 175 types 5 horsepower generator set, 2 sets of 250-watt amplifiers, 1 set each of receiver and recorder, 2 highways of broadcasting lines were set up, 8 tweeters were installed and operated for 11 years, during which the lines were expanded to 48.6 highways. 80 tweeters, broadcasting 5 times a day for a total of about 10 hours.

In March 1979, the submarine communication fiber optic cable was built with Dadeng Island, and the switchboard telephone was opened; in December 1992, the program-controlled telephone was opened; in May 1995, the mobile phone was opened; in 2008, the cable television was opened with the project of Xiamen Radio and Television Village Access.

=== Other Infrastructure ===
- Firefighting: initially, the nearest fire station to Xiaodeng Island is Xindian Fire Squadron, which is 21 km away and can be reached only by waterway. Alerted by the serious loss of the fire in Yingling Temple of Xiaodeng in August 2008, Xiaodeng Island established Xiaodeng Community Volunteer Fire Brigade after the Spring Festival in 2010, which is the first island community fire department in Xiamen, and upgraded to be formed as Xiaodeng Community Micro Fire Station in 2016, and fire trucks can also enter the island through this bridge after the temporary steel trestle bridge is built.
- Education: there is Xiaodeng elementary school on Xiaodeng Island, formerly named Dadengjiang elementary school, which was founded in 1937. In 1997, the area of the elementary school was 6,437 square meters, including 1,236 square meters of the school building, with 7 classes, 269 students, and 10 employees; in 2007, the area of the elementary school was 7,563 square meters, including 1,628 square meters of the school building, with 6 classes, 168 students, 12 employees, and 49 computers.
- Environment: The garbage on Xiaodeng Island was originally landfilled or transported out of the island. In 2007, there were 7 cleaners and 4 garbage trucks on the island, then 12-year-old student Qiu Naiqin wrote a letter to the then mayor of Xiamen, Liu Cigui, about environmental problems, that is, 20 garbage houses were built on the island in October of that year, 100 garbage cans and 1 three-wheeled garbage truck were added.
- Medical treatment: In 2005, a health clinic was built on Xiaodeng Island for full-time doctors.
- Funeral: In 1995, public welfare cemetery was implemented in Xiaodeng Island, and crematoriums and cremation rooms were built and cremation was implemented in May 2004.

== Resources and industry ==
=== Water resources ===
There is a spring on Xiaodeng Island, but it is called Pin Quan, commonly known as the immortal well, named because the three stones seeping out of the spring are like the word "Pin", and it is gone at high tide and clear at low tide.

=== Mineral salt industry ===
There are mainly minerals such as potassium feldspar, construction sand, and other rich salt resources in Xiaodeng Island, which was surrounded by the sea in 1970 to build the salt field and was under the jurisdiction of Dadeng.

=== Agriculture ===
As of 2001, there are about 100 mu of arable land on Xiaodeng Island, which is planted with dry crops such as sweet potatoes.

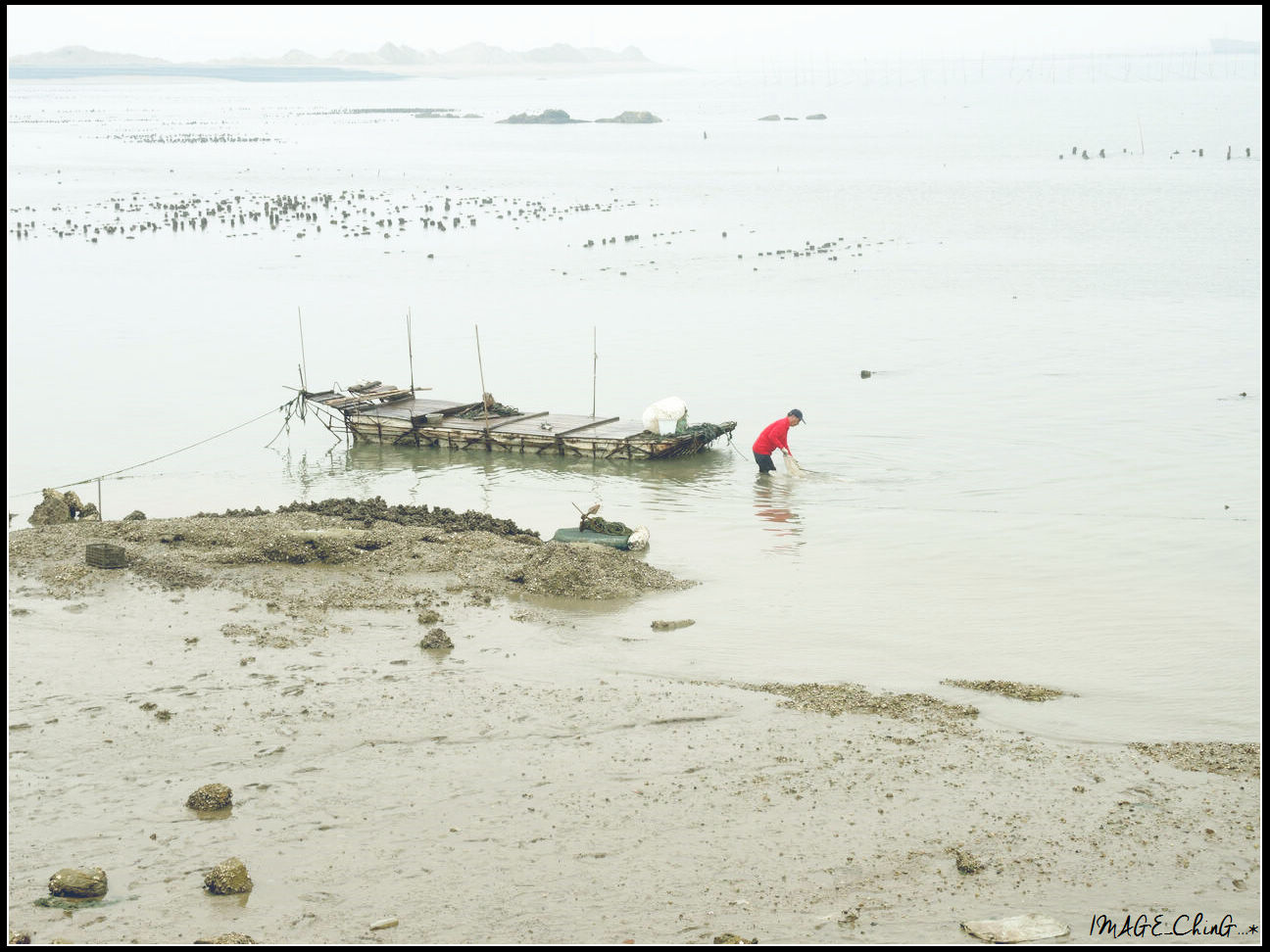
Fishermen at work in Xiaodeng Island, taken in 2014

=== Animal resources ===
There are heron breeding sites on Xiaodeng Island, which is located in the middle and south of the island. The main herons are little egrets, also night herons and Chinese pond herons. There are also rare species of amphioxus in the vicinity, which is the object of nature protection of Xiamen City. (Note: The protected area is in the sea east of Xiaodeng Island, the island itself is not in the protected area.) After the establishment of Xiamen amphioxus nature reserve in September 1991, it was upgraded to the national level in April 2000 and the scope of the reserve was expanded to other islands such as Xiaodeng Island. The main industries in the sea area of Xiaodeng Island are fishing industry and aquaculture, among which fishing is mainly carried out in the sea area near the island, and fishing mainly uses methods and tools such as trawling, seining, setting, gillnetting, and triangle bindings. The depth of the fishing area is within 20 meters, and the substrate is sandy mud and mud sand, and the main products include nine shrimps, hairy shrimps, Zhou's new shrimps, spotted shrimps, and one-horned new shrimps. Besides, there are also horseshoe crabs, which are not allowed to be caught now. The farming industry is the main source of income for the residents of Xiaodeng Island, mainly farming nori, sea oysters, fish, shellfish, and shrimps, among others. Among them, the spores of Xiaodeng nori were cultivated in space with Shenzhou 7 spacecraft in 2008. Xiaodeng Island also cultured kelp from 1983 to 1991, with a total area of 100 mu of Da Deng kelp cultured in the same period, and the annual output of dried products is nearly 100 tons; green grouper was discovered and artificially cultured in 2007, with an annual output of about 10,000 tails; a new demonstration base for the construction of grouper seed innovation and industrialization project was built in 2011.

=== Tourism resources ===
There are rich tourism resources on Xiaodeng Island, such as the Xiaodeng Island tunnel (303 civil defense project, 1,300 meters long, dug in 1969 and completed in 1972), Bumin Iron Tree King (600 years old), Dokki Forest, Tang Dynasty Beauty Well, Xiaodeng Yingling Temple, Xiaodeng Leisure Fishing Village, etc. Among them, Xiaodeng Leisure Fishing Village is the first leisure fishery plan compiled in Fujian Province in 2005 and is the first batch in China. It is one of the first national leisure fishery demonstration bases in China and mainly focuses on grouper factory tourism projects with grouper scientific research, nursery, breeding, and ornamental projects, and the village also has resort hotels, business meetings, theme parties, expansion training, and other projects to make the island a resort base. Besides, the island tent tourism and culture festival will be held on Xiaodeng Island from July to August every year, and the seaweed tourism and culture festival will be held on Xiaodeng Island from January to November every year.

== Population ==
There were 2,372 residents in Xiaodeng Island in 1989, about 2,500 in 2001, more than 2,700 in 2007 and about 3,000 in 2008, mainly with the population of surnames Qiu (moved in with Qiu Kwai at the end of the Song dynasty), Xu (moved in with Danzao in Kinmen in the Ming dynasty) and Su (moved in with Hongtang in Tong'an in the Ming dynasty), among which there are many surnames Qiu and Xu in the front fort and also Hong and Wu in the back fort.
