= Dadeng Island =

Island in Xiamen, China

Coordinates: 24.5592°N 118.3208°E

Dadeng Island (Traditional Chinese: 大嶝島) is an island in the southeastern part of Xiang'an District, Xiamen City, Fujian Province, People's Republic of China, with an area of approximately 13 square kilometers. Administratively, it is currently under the jurisdiction of Dadeng Subdistrict in the same district. There is a Dadeng Militia outpost on the island, established in 1950 and initially manned by local residents. Since 1992, it has been manned by a fixed rotation of 10 local female militia members.

Dadeng Island, along with Xiaodeng Island and Jiaoyu Island, forms the Dadeng Island Archipelago. The island features the Dadeng Bridge, which is 931 meters long and connects Dadeng Island with the Xiang'an Peninsula.
