= Kao Kuei-yuan =

Chinese general and Minister of National Defense (1907-2012)

Kao Kuei-yuan 高魁元
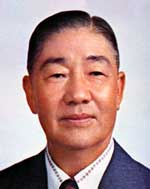
- Kao Kuei-yuan

Minister of National Defense
- In office 1 July 1973 – 19 November 1981
- Preceded by: Chen Ta-ching
- Succeeded by: Sung Chang-chih

Personal details
- Born: 26 March 1907 Qian County, Shandong, Qing China (now Yicheng, Zaozhuang, Shandong)
- Died: 7 May 2012 (aged 105) Neihu District, Taipei, Taiwan
- Awards: Order of Blue Sky and White Sun

Military service
- Allegiance: Republic of China
- Branch/service: National Revolutionary Army; Republic of China Army
- Years of service: 1926–2012
- Rank: Colonel general
- Battles/wars: Northern Expedition; Defense of the Great Wall; Second Sino-Japanese War; Battle of Shanghai; Battle of Kunlun Pass; Third Battle of Changsha; Battle of West Hunan; Chinese Civil War; Nanma–Linqu Campaign; Battle of Guningtou

Kao Kuei-yuan (Chinese: 高魁元; pinyin: Gāo Kuíyuán; 26 March 1907 - 7 May 2012) was a general of the Republic of China during the Second Sino-Japanese War and the Chinese Civil War. He served as the Minister of Defense of the Republic of China from 1973 to 1981. He was the last surviving graduate of the original Whampoa Military Academy in Guangzhou when he died in 2012.

== Biography ==
Kao was born in modern Yicheng, Zaozhuang, Shandong in 1907. He entered the Whampoa Military Academy in 1926. After graduating from the academy's 4th class, he participated in the National Revolutionary Army's Northern Expedition. After the end of the Northern Expedition, Kao served as the commander of the 3rd Battalion and the 593rd Regiment of the 18th Army and participated in several campaigns against the Chinese Red Army.

After the beginning of the Second-Sino Japanese War, Kao was sent to participate in the Battle of Shanghai. In 1938, he was promoted to major general and served as the commander of the 295th Brigade of the 99th Division. The following year, he was promoted to division commander and participated in the Battle of Kunlun Pass, the Third Battle of Changsha and the Battle of West Hunan.

After the end of the war with Japan, Kao was given command of the 18th Brigade of the 11th Division, and later became the deputy commander of the 11th Division. In 1949 Kao became the commander of the 18th Army and led the army to withdraw to Kinmen. He commanded the 18th Army during the Battle of Guningtou.

Kao became director of the Political Warfare Bureau in 1961. In 1965, Chiang Kai-shek promoted Kao to Commander of the Army. He was then promoted to colonel general in 1967. In 1973, Kao was about to retire, however newly appointed Premier Chiang Ching-kuo convinced Kao to stay in service and appointed him became the Minister of National Defense in July 1973. When he retired from that position in November 1981, he was the last graduate of the Whampoa Military Academy still in active duty. Kao's position was taken over by Sung Chang-chih. After retiring, Kao became a strategic advisor to the Presidential Office, a position he held until his death in 2012.

== Death ==
Kao, the last surviving graduate of the original Whampoa Military Academy, died of multiple organ dysfunction syndrome at the Tri-Service General Hospital in Neihu District, Taipei on 7 May 2012 at the age of 105. His funeral was held on 2 June, with then president Ma Ying-jeou issuing a commendation order for Kao.
