= Jiaoyu Island =

Island of Fujian, China

Coordinates: 24°33′11″N 118°24′12″E

Jiaoyu Island (Traditional Chinese: 角嶼) is an island off the coast of Fujian Province, China, administratively part of the Xiang'an District of Xiamen City, Fujian Province, People's Republic of China. Currently uninhabited, it is only occupied by the 32846th Company of the coastal defense regiment of the Fujian Provincial Military Region of the People's Liberation Army, known as the "First Sentry of the Southeast."

== Introduction ==
Jiaoyu Island is one of the islands in the Deng Island group, collectively known as the "Three Islands" along with Dadeng Island and Xiaodeng Island.

On June 27, 1984, the Kinmen Defense Command of the Republic of China shelled Jiaoyu Island in pursuit of deserters, resulting in casualties among the People's Liberation Army, marking the only direct military conflict between the two sides across the Taiwan Strait since 1979.
