= CM12 =

CM12 may refer to the following articles:

- CM12, Taiwan military tank.
- CM12 postcode district, part of the Chelmsford postcode area
