= CM21 =

CM21 may refer to the following articles:

- CM21 armored vehicle, Taiwan armored vehicle
- CM postcode area, part of the Chelmsford postcode area
