= CM24 =

CM24 may refer to the following articles:

- CM21 armored vehicle, Taiwan ammunition carrier
- CM postcode area, part of the Chelmsford postcode area
