= CM22 =

CM22 may refer to the following articles:

- CM21 armored vehicle, Taiwan mortar carrier
- CM postcode area, part of the Chelmsford postcode area
