= 542nd Armored Brigade (Taiwan) =

542nd Armored Brigade (1998–present) 42nd Independent Armored Brigade (1976–1998) 2nd Independent Armored Brigade (1970–1976) 2nd Armored Division (1954–1970)
- 陸軍裝甲第五四二旅
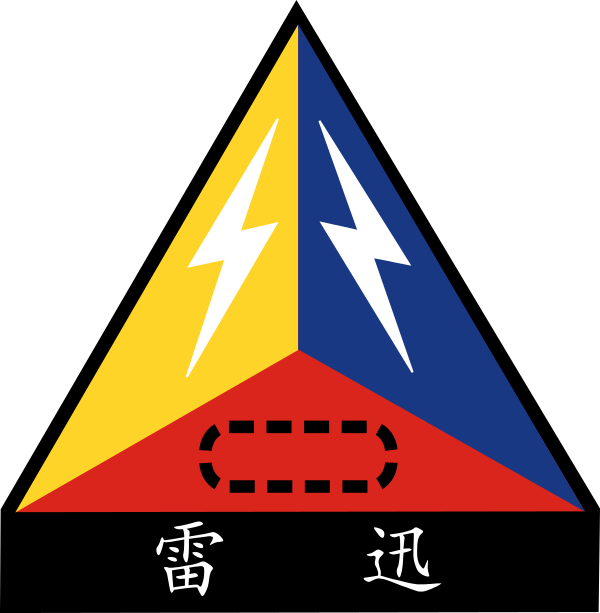
- Insignia of the brigade
- Active: 1970–present
- Country: Republic of China
- Branch: Republic of China Army
- Type: Armored forces
- Size: Brigade
- Nickname: "Rapid Thunder"

Commanders
- Current commander: Major General Liu Wei-hsin

The 542nd Armored Brigade (Chinese: 陸軍裝甲第五四二旅) is an armored unit of the Republic of China Army.

== History ==
The brigade traces its history to the creation of the 2nd Armored Division in May 1954 in Taichung by combining the 1st and 3rd Armored Brigades. In September 1970 the division was reformed as the 2nd Independent Armored Brigade, under the direct command of Army General Headquarters, and in 1976 its number was changed to 42nd. In 1983 it was made part of the 6th Army Corps, which oversees the defense of northern Taiwan. In 1998, as part of the armed forces streamlining program, the unit became the 542nd Armored Brigade.

In 2020 it was reorganized into a combined arms unit, though its name has not changed. There were reports in 2023 that soldiers of the 542nd Armored Brigade were sent to the United States for training on the M1 Abrams tank, which will eventually replace Taiwan's older tanks.

== Organization ==
Since the 2020 reorganization, the 542nd Armored Brigade has three combined arms battalions, one artillery battalion, and independent companies.

== Equipment ==
The brigade is currently equipped with the CM11 Brave Tiger tank and M109 howitzer.
