= CM11 =

CM11 may refer to the following articles:

- CM11 Brave Tiger, Taiwan military tank.
- CM11 postcode district, part of the Chelmsford postcode area
