= 6th Army Corps (Republic of China) =

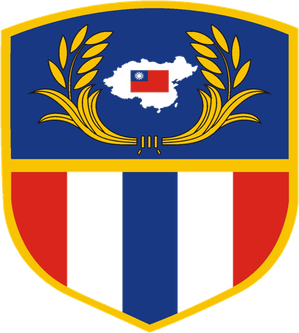
- Patch of the 6th Army Corps
- Active: 1950–present
- Country: Republic of China
- Branch: Republic of China Army
- Type: Corps

The 6th Army Corps is one of the major formations of the Republic of China Army and is tasked with defending northern Taiwan.

== History ==
The Northern Taiwan Army was established in 1950 and was renamed the 1st Army Corps in 1954. Its name was changed again in January 1976 to 3rd Army Corps, before being changed again later that same year in August, becoming the 6th Army Corps.

As of 2019, there are plans for the armored units of the 6th Army Corps to receive 108 modern M1 Abrams tanks from the United States, replacing the older M60 Patton and CM11 Brave Tiger tanks. In 2023, soldiers from the 542nd Armored Brigade went to the U.S. for training on the usage of the M1 Abrams.

In 2021 it was announced that the corps will become part of the 3rd Combat Theater Command.

== Organization ==
The 6th Army Corps Headquarters was renamed the 6th Army Corps Command in 2006.

The structure of the corps is as follows:

- Guandu Area Command
- Lanyang Area Command
- 269th Mechanized Infantry Brigade
- 542nd Armored Brigade
- 584th Armored Brigade
- 21st Artillery Command
- 53rd Engineer Group
- 73rd Signals Group
- 33rd Chemical Warfare Group
