= Republic of China Armoured Vehicle Development Center =

Republic of China Armoured Vehicle Development Center (Chinese: 中華民國戰車發展研究中心) is a military designer and manufacturer in Taiwan which has been a supplier armoured vehicles for the Republic of China Army and Republic of China Marine Corps.

The center was formed in 1980 in a partnership with General Dynamics in the development of the CM11 Brave Tiger tank.

== Products ==
The development center's products have been licensed version of military hardware from the United States.

- CM11 Brave Tiger
- CM12 tank
- CM21 armored vehicle
  - CM22 mortar carrier
  - CM23 mortar carrier
  - CM24 ammo carrier
  - CM25 TOW launcher
  - CM26 command track

== See also ==
- Lungteh Shipbuilding
- CSBC Corporation, Taiwan
- National Chung-Shan Institute of Science and Technology
- Aerospace Industrial Development Corporation
