= CM12 tank =

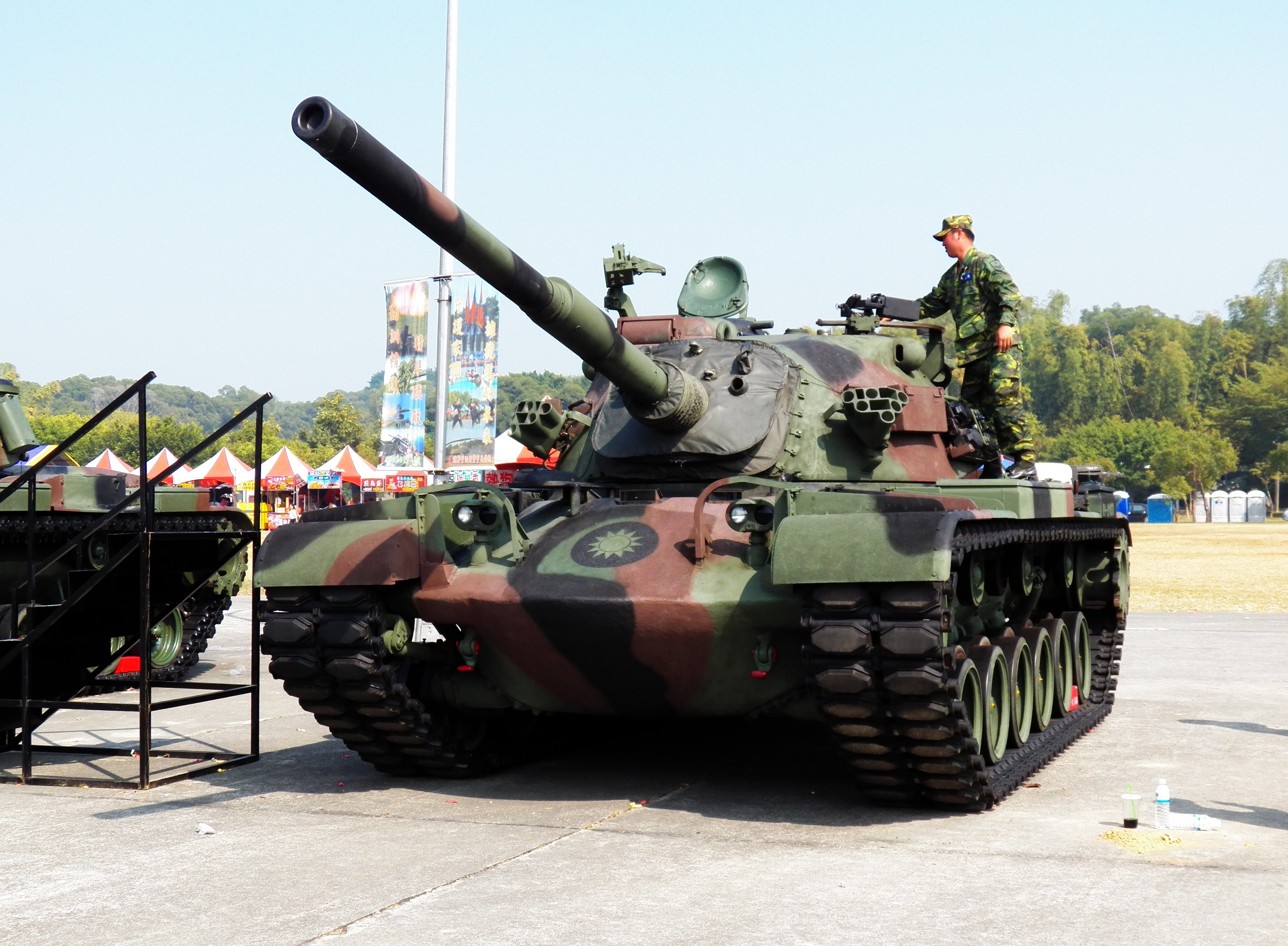
- A CM12 at the ROCA Infantry School
- Type: Main battle tank
- Place of origin: Taiwan

Service history
- In service: 1990–2025
- Used by: Republic of China Army (historical)

Production history
- Designer: Armored Vehicle Development Center
- Manufacturer: Armored Vehicle Development Center
- Unit cost: US$ 3.5 million
- No. built: 100

Specifications
- Mass: 48.5 tonnes (53.5 short tons; 47.7 long tons)
- Length: 6.95 meters (22 ft 10 in) (hull); 9.30 meters (30 ft 6 in) (cannon forward)
- Width: 3.65 meters (12 ft 0 in)
- Height: 3.1 meters (10 ft 2 in)
- Crew: 4
- Main armament: 105 mm (4.1 in) M68A1 gun
- Secondary armament: .50 BMG (12.7×99mm) M2 Browning; 7.62×51mm NATO M240 machine gun 7.62×51mm NATO T74 machine gun
- Engine: Continental AVDS-1790-2C air-cooled Twin-turbo diesel engine 750 hp (560 kW)
- Power/weight: 15.46 hp/t
- Suspension: Torsion bar suspension
- Operational range: 203 kilometers (100 mi)
- Maximum speed: 48 km/h

The CM12 tank is a modified M48A3 made for the Republic of China Army, situated on Taiwan. The Armored Vehicle Development Center (AVDC) used the extra 100 fire-control system units from the production of the CM11 Brave Tiger to modify the existing M48A3 tanks of the ROC Army.

== History ==
On May 24, 2025, authorities announced that the CM12 would be decommissioned in 2026, and the entire fleet was sent to a military logistics center for dismantling.

== Design ==
The modification was completed as of 1993. The CM12 can be distinguished from the CM11 by the rounded glacis plates, and from the M48A3 by the 105mm M68A1 cannon, which is longer than the 90mm T139/M3A1 cannon on the M48A3 and lacks a muzzle brake, and by the different commander's cupola.

== Modifications ==
The CM12 program selected some M48A3 hulls, which were previously upgraded from M48A1s by replacing the petrol engines with diesel engines and installing a new transmission. The new round of modifications adopted new tracks that don't wear out paved roads as quickly and replaced the turret with the CM11's turret. The modified tank was renamed CM12.

The idea of the CM12 was derived from the M48A5, an example of which the AVDC received during the Brave Tiger (CM11) upgrade program for reference. The exterior of CM12 and M48A5 are similar, but the interior is completely different, with the main difference being that Taiwan's M48A3 retained the flush engine deck from the M48A1, the diesel engine being accommodated by deleting adjacent fuel cells. This means that Taiwan's M48A3 and CM12 have a far shorter operational range compared to an American-built or -converted M48A3/A5 (although still much better than that of the M48A1, able to go near the old Patton's maximum range without needing external fuel drums). The CM12 also has the same upgraded fire-control system as the CM11 whereas the M48A5 has no upgraded fire-control system.

The armament of CM12 is identical to CM11's. The main cannon is an M68A1 105mm cannon, which can fire ammunition such as armour-piercing fin-stabilized discarding-sabot (APFSDS) Rounds. It can carry up to 60 rounds on board. One M2HB machine gun is mounted on the commander's cupola, one T74 machine gun on the gunner's cupola, and one coaxial M240 machine gun inside the turret.

The protection on CM12 is outdated, being unable to stop shells fired from the 125mm smoothbore cannon mounted on tanks used by the Chinese People's Liberation Army such as the Type 96, and the material used is inferior to that used on newer tanks, being made of cast steel instead of more modern composite materials. After the great disarmament of Ching Shih (精實案) and Ching Chin (精進案), the existing CM11 and M60A3 TTS tanks are enough for the ROCA, and almost half of the CM12s are now retired.

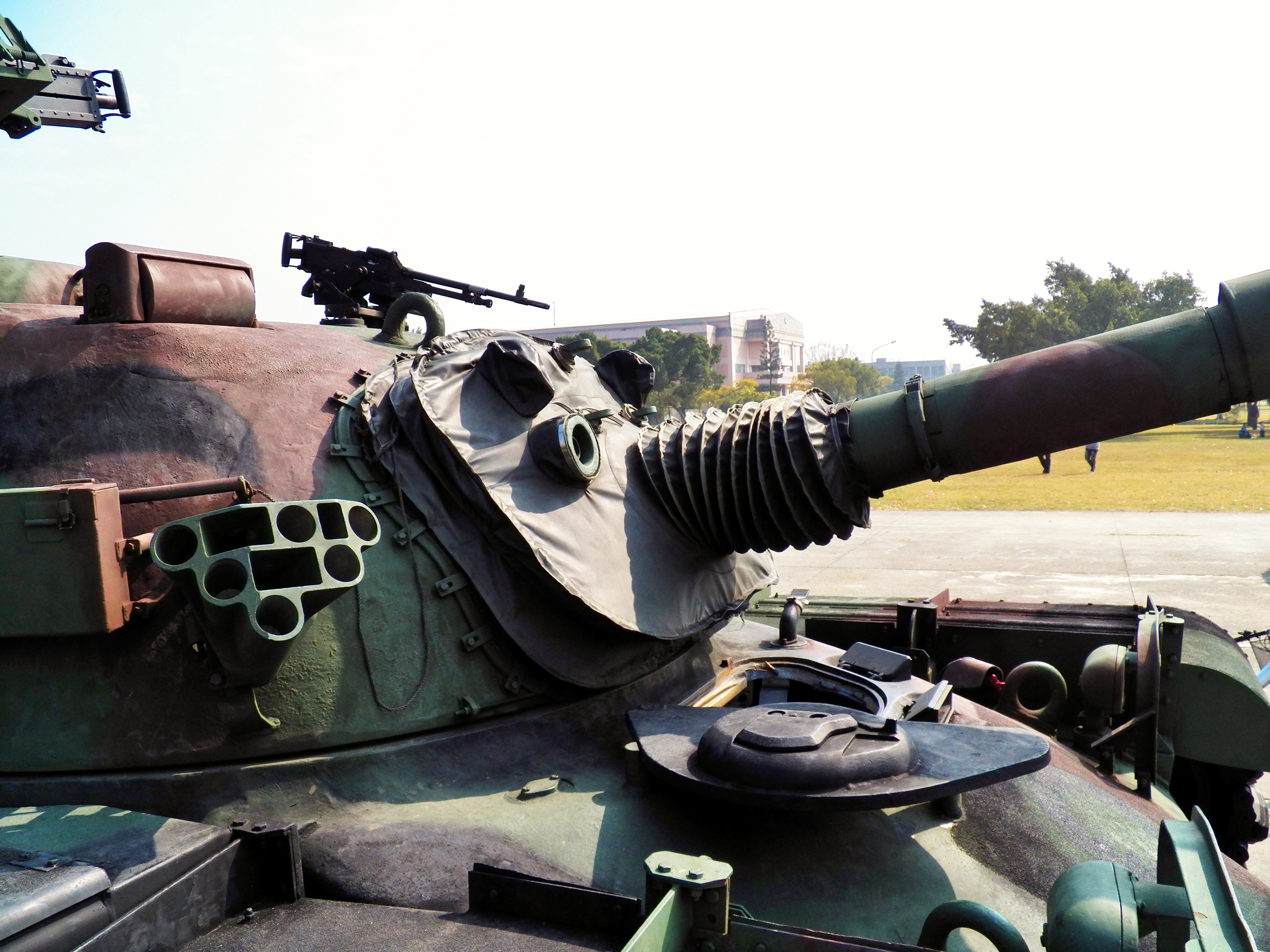
Close up of the CM12's turret

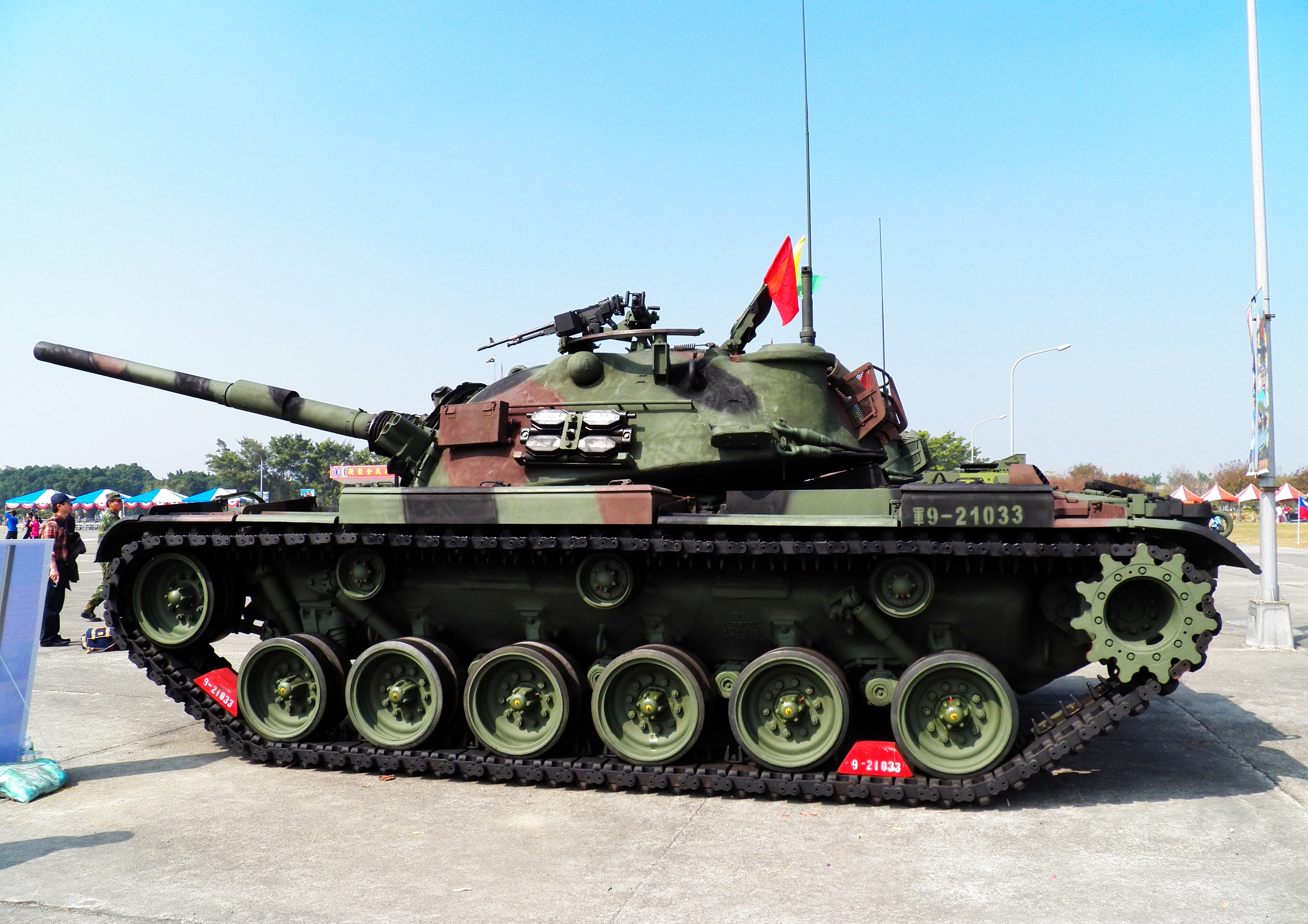
Side view of the CM12

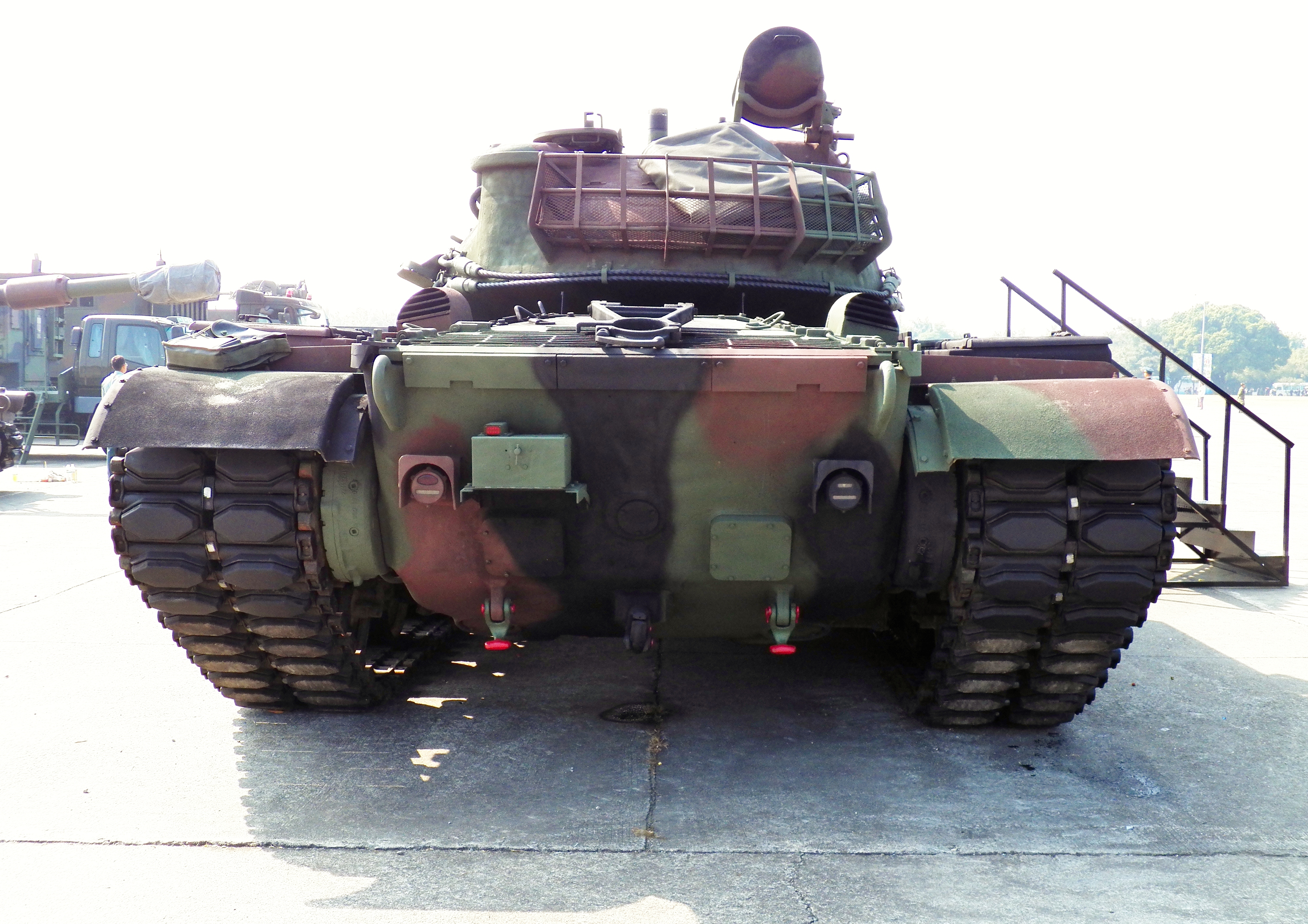
Rear view of the CM12

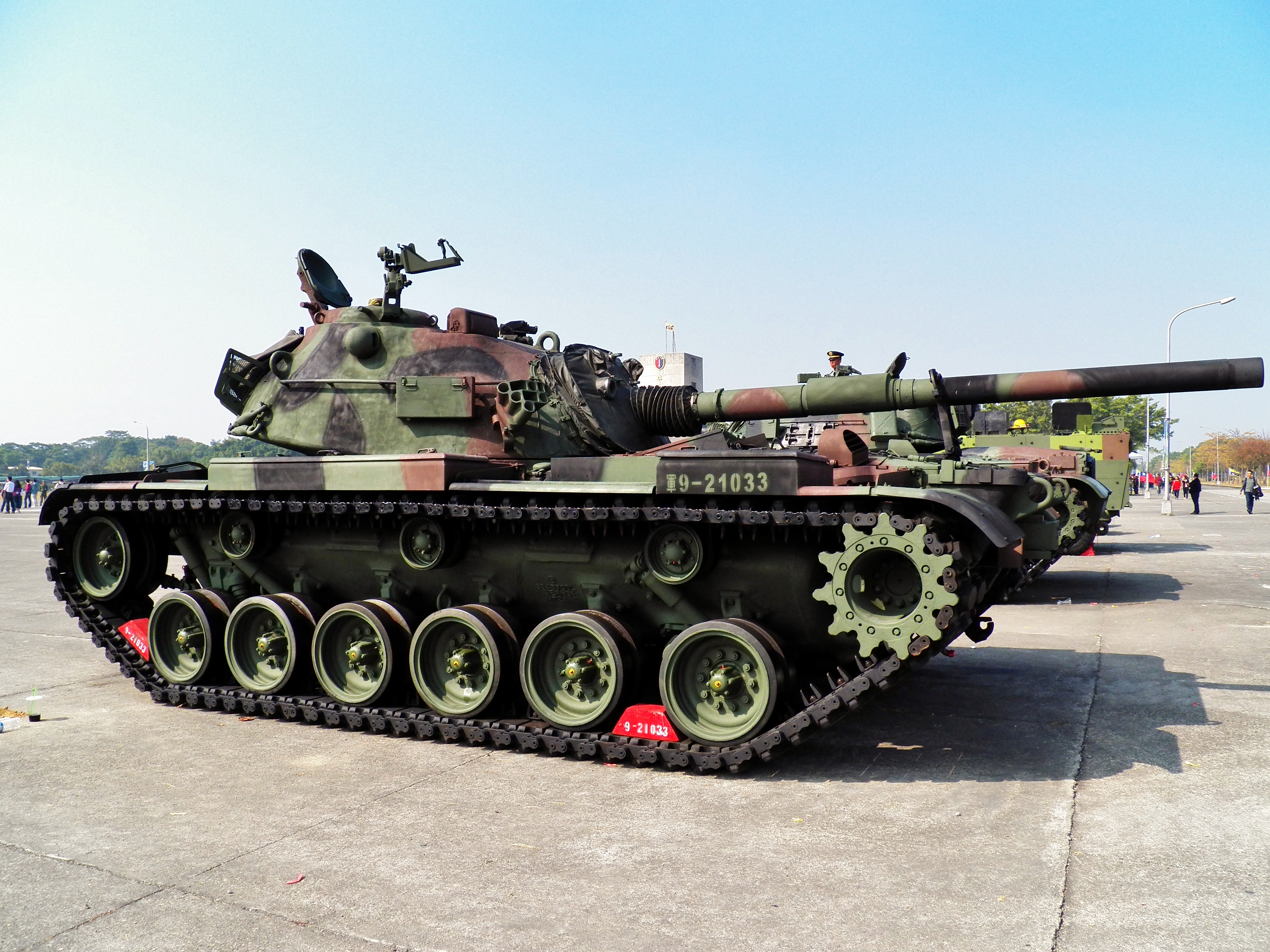
A ready-to-transport CM12

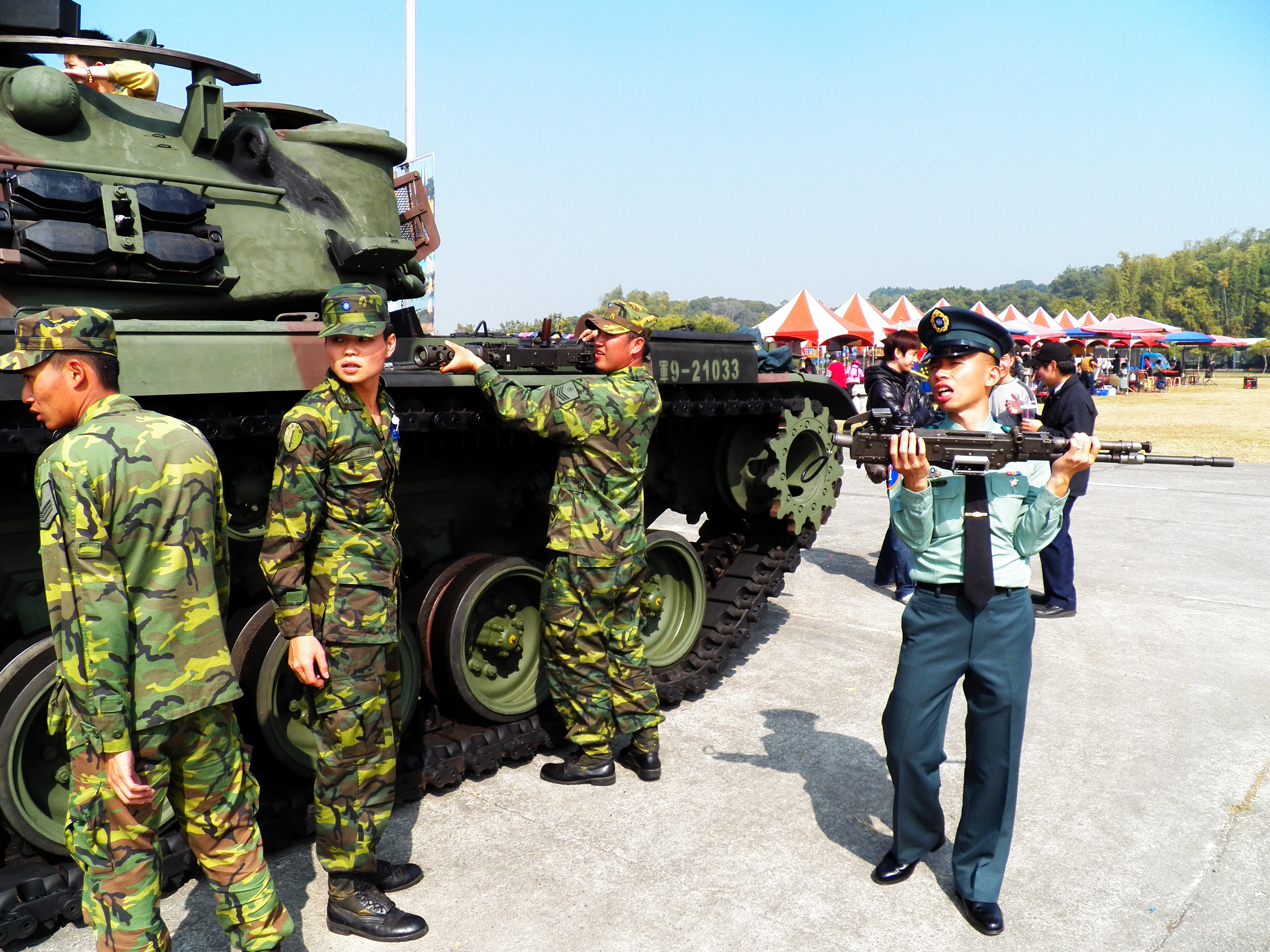
Soldiers removing machine guns from a CM12
