= CM21 armored vehicle =

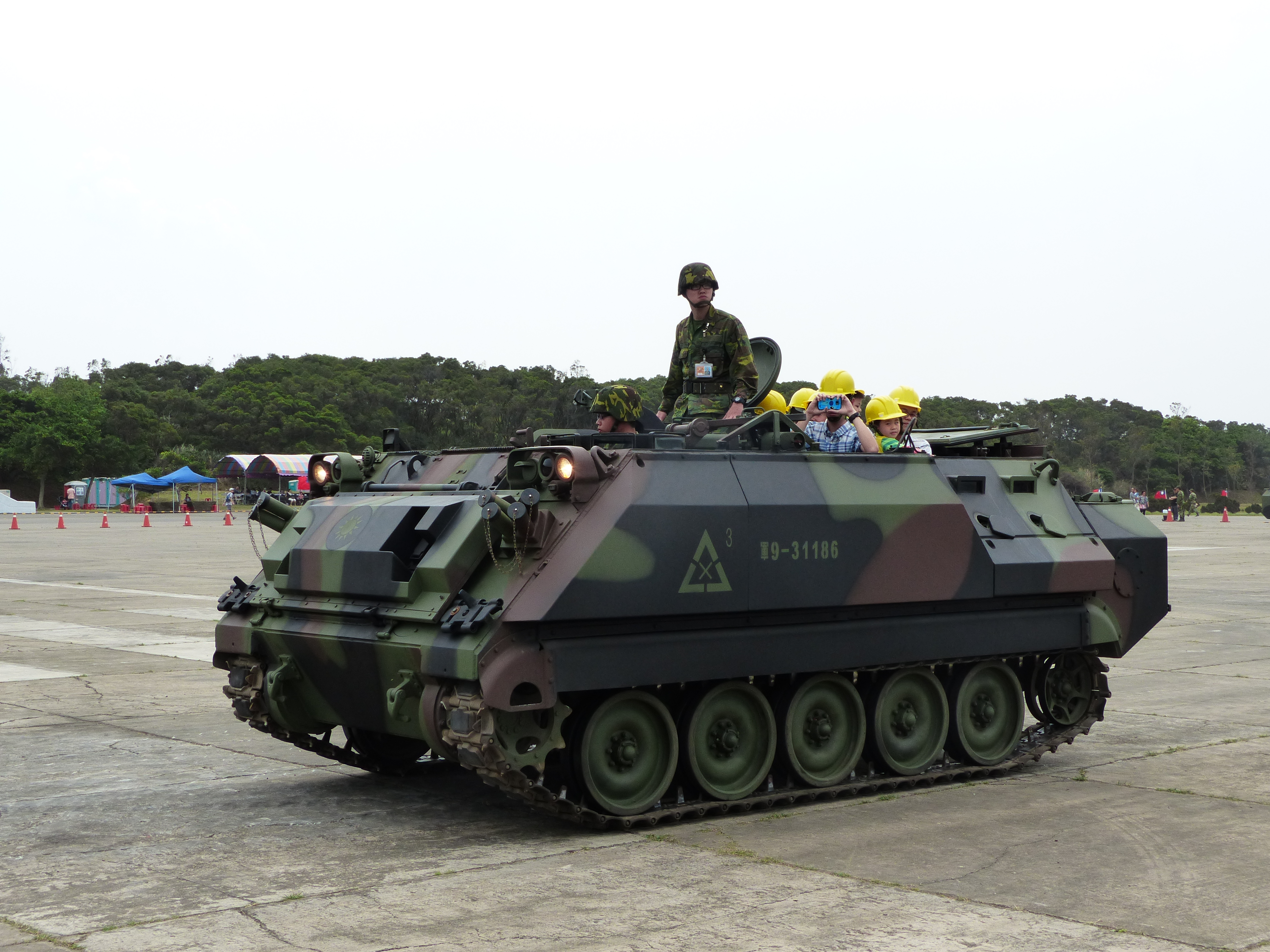
- A CM21 APC on display at the 2014 Hukou Camp Open Day event
- Place of origin: Taiwan

Service history
- In service: 1982–present
- Used by: Republic of China Armed Forces

Production history
- Designer: ROC Armored Vehicle Development Center
- Designed: 1970s
- Manufacturer: ROC Armored Vehicle Development Center
- Produced: 1980s
- No. built: Over 1,000 (all variants)
- Variants: 5 variants (see variants)

Specifications
- Mass: 12.7 tonnes (14.0 short tons; 12.5 long tons) (without weapons)
- Length: 4.863 meters (15 ft 11.5 in)
- Width: 2.686 meters (8 ft 9.7 in)
- Height: 2.5 meters (8 ft 2 in)
- Crew: 2
- Passengers: 12
- Armor: Aluminum hull Spaced Armor filled with Polyurethane on front and rear
- Main armament: M2 Browning machine gun
- Secondary armament: Mk 19 automatic grenade launcher 107 millimeters (4.2 in)/ 120 millimeters (4.7 in) mortar (CM22); 81 millimeters (3.2 in) mortar (CM23); BGM-71 TOW missile (CM25); 8 smoke grenade launcher (CM21, 22, 23, 26); 6 smoke grenade launcher (CM25)
- Engine: Perkins TV8-640 turbodiesel Detroit Diesel 6V53 diesel engine 210 hp (160 kW)
- Power/weight: 22.36 hp/t
- Transmission: Allison TX100-1 automatic gearbox three forward gears, one reverse gear
- Suspension: Torsion bar suspension, five road wheels
- Operational range: 550 kilometers (300 mi)
- Maximum speed: 66 km/h

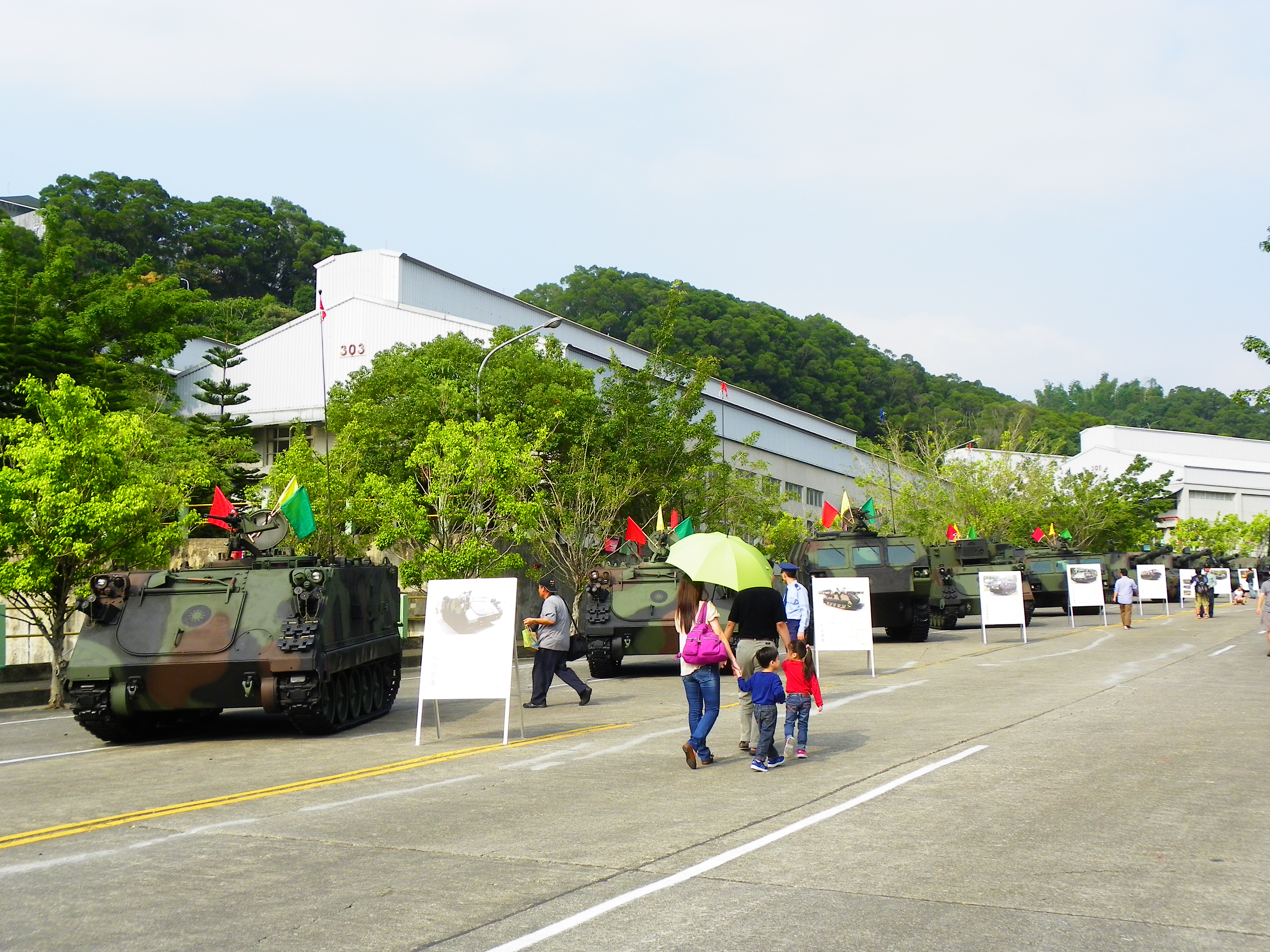
ROCA armored personnel carriers and self-propelled artillery display in Yue Kang Road

The CM21 is a Taiwanese armored vehicle designed and manufactured by the Republic of China Armored Vehicle Development Center, based on the American M113 APC. The first prototype was manufactured in 1979, and the CM21 officially entered service in 1982 and remains in use today, with over 1,000 units manufactured and a number of different variants.

== History ==
At the end of 1967, the United States and the Republic of China (Taiwan) signed the Third-Nation Overhaul Program and began to repair US military equipment in Vietnam until the end of the Vietnam War. This allowed the RoC to accumulate experiences in the overhauling, welding, parts manufacturing, vehicle assembly, and testing of the M113 APC. In 1975, The Combined Logistics Command carried out the "Wan Cheng Program" (萬乘計劃), to domestically produce three M113 hulls using the aluminum alloy plates produced by the Taiwan Aluminum Corporation (known today as the Chinese Steel Aluminum Corporation).

The Wan Cheng 1 was an imitation of the M106 mortar carrier, but the 4.2 inch rifled mortar was replaced with a larger Type 63 120 mm smoothbore mortar, and this innovation later became the CM22 howitzer carrier. The Wan Cheng 2 is an attempt to create a light tank by moving the engine to the rear and lowering the front half of the hull to accommodate a M24 turret while keeping the vehicle from being top-heavy. The Wan Cheng 3 had mounted a "Worker Bees IV MLRS" (工蜂四型多管火箭), a multiple launch rocket system (MLRS). The MLRS was later mounted on six more US made M113s (An unrelated Wan Cheng 4 project involves one M48A1 tank re-fitted into a M48A5).

The Wan Cheng program provided a solid foundation for the design, manufacture and development of the CM21 armored vehicle.

== Design ==
The standard version of CM21 is an armored personnel carrier (APC) that can carry up to 12 soldiers. It is largely the same as the basic M113 and inherits the same engine and transmission from the source design, but the welded aluminum alloy hull armor is further augmented with spaced armour at the front and the sides, the cavity within the spaced armor being filled with polyurethane to absorb the energy of incoming projectiles.

Overall, the CM21 is better protected than the M113, but the CM21 is 400 kilograms (880 pounds) heavier than the M113 and has slightly inferior mobility.

There are two firing ports on each side of the hull and one at the rear. Therefore, soldiers are sitting face to face in the front of the passenger compartment, and back to back in the rear. The CM21 has floating capability, meaning it is able to cross water that is up to 1.5 metres (4.9 feet) deep without preparation. There are two water pumps that are switched on to lower the front flap. It is propelled by its tracks while in water.

Just like the M113, the CM21 can also have external fuel tanks mounted on the rear. The basic armament of the CM21 is one M2 Browning machine gun or an Mk 19 automatic grenade launcher, and a quad-mounted smoke grenade launcher on both sides of the front.

A CM21 is able carrying an M2 and an Mk 19 at the same time by using a bi-mounted gun rack.

== Variants ==
=== CM21 ===
==== CM21A1 ====
The CM21 models currently in service are CM21A1. The CM21 is still a basic armored personnel carrier, and it cannot be upgraded to the CM21A2 infantry fighting vehicle. Also, with the introduction of CM32 wheeled armored vehicle, it is more unlikely that the CM21A1 will receive an upgrade.

==== CM21A2 ====
CM21A2 is a modified version of CM21A1, inspired by the American M1132A2. The engine's intake has been modified to take air from the inside of the vehicle, rather than using exhausted gas, which reduces the crew's performance in combat. The side armor is also replaced with a net armour to protect the vehicle from anti tank weapons with shaped charges.

CM21A2 is predicted to be upgraded directly into an infantry fighting vehicle, and was tested with a French GIAT Dragar 25 mm gun turret, but it was not accepted; a simple command turret was also added for the testing.

=== CM22 mortar carrier ===
CM22 is a variant of CM21 with a 107/ 120 mm mortar, very similar to the American M106 mortar carrier. CM22 was developed in 1987 and was still in production in 1999, but the ammo rack is different with an M106 in the late version of CM22, along with parts from CM21 such as headlights.

The passenger compartment is modified to carry mortar, and cancelled firing ports and spaced armor. The exterior of the CM22 is basically the same as M106.

=== CM23 mortar carrier ===
CM23 is a variant of the CM22 with an 81 mm mortar, identical to the American M125.

=== CM25 TOW launcher ===
CM25 is a variant of the CM21 which has the capability of firing TOW missiles, in order to engage armored targets. The CM25 has a modified passenger compartment to store TOW missiles, and has replaced the quad-mounted smoke grenade launcher with triple mounted ones. It also omitted the firing ports and adding the spaced armor, but the protection of the CM25 is not any stronger. The CM25 is only operated by the Republic of China Marine Corps, while the Republic of China Army is still operating M113A1 TOW launcher. The spaced armor of CM25 is filled with polystyrene to increase buoyancy for the Marine Corps' amphibious operations.

=== CM26 command track ===
CM26 is a command track derived from the CM22, and it is similar to the American M577.

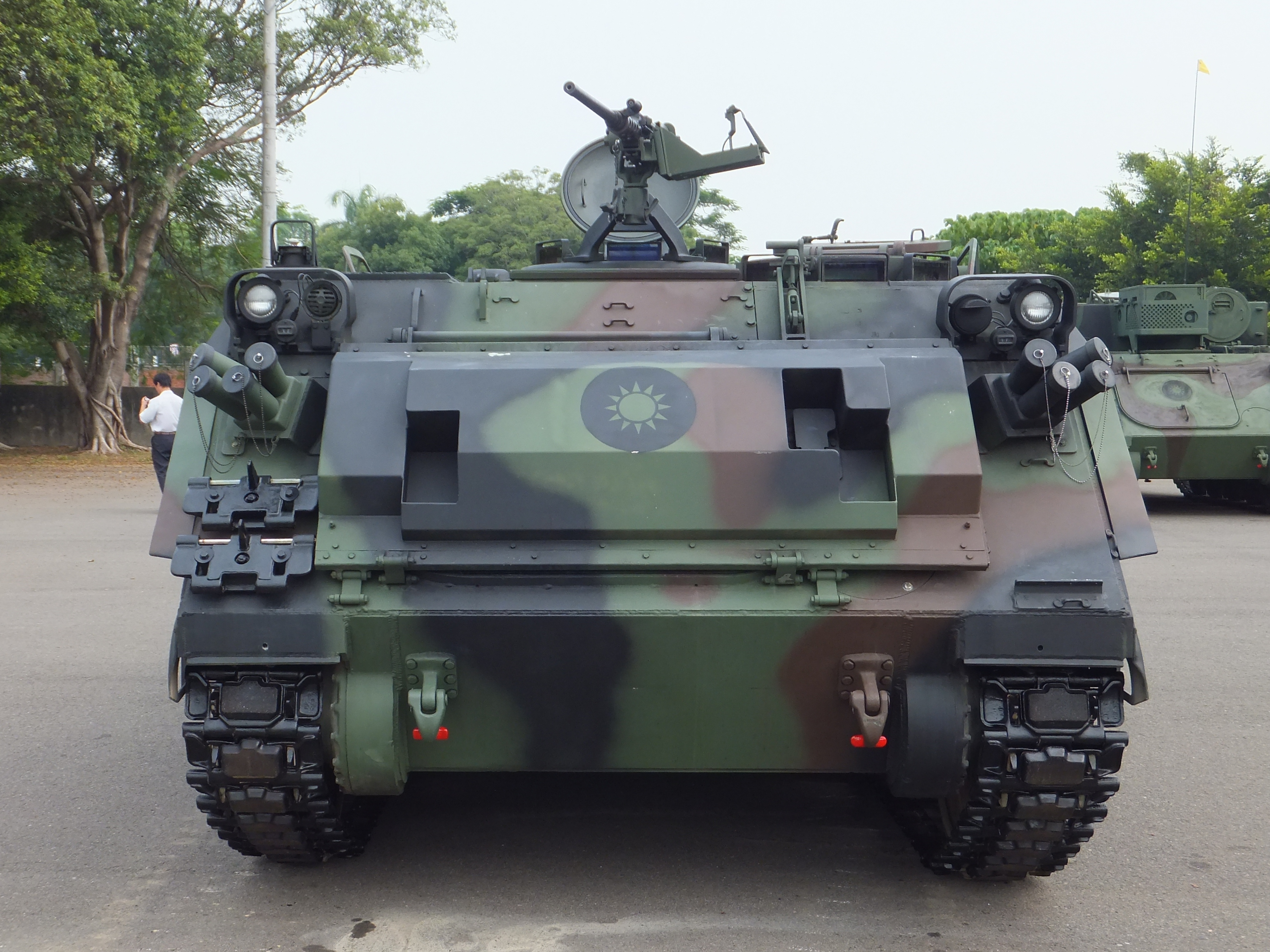
CM21A1 front view

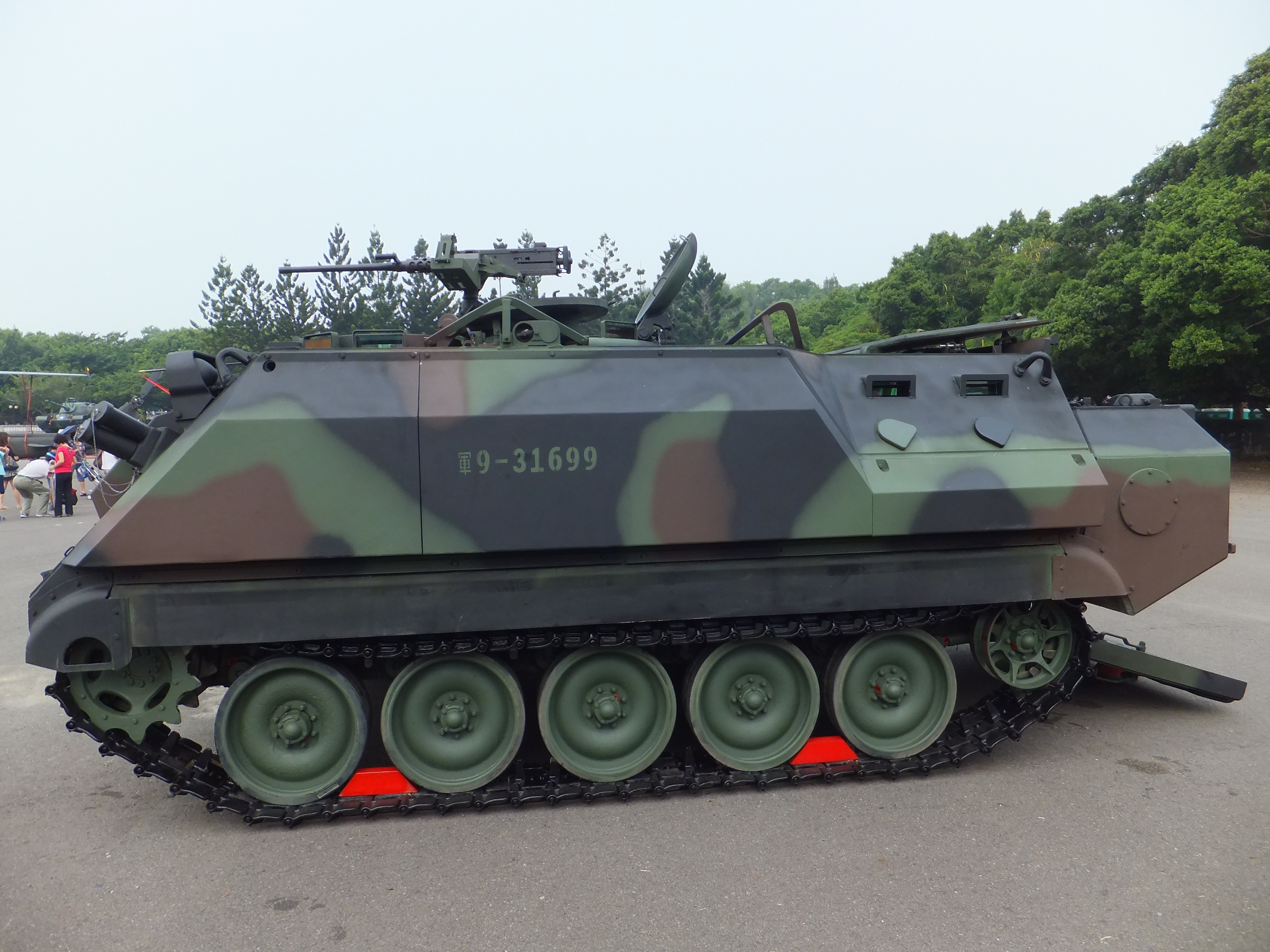
Side view CM21A1

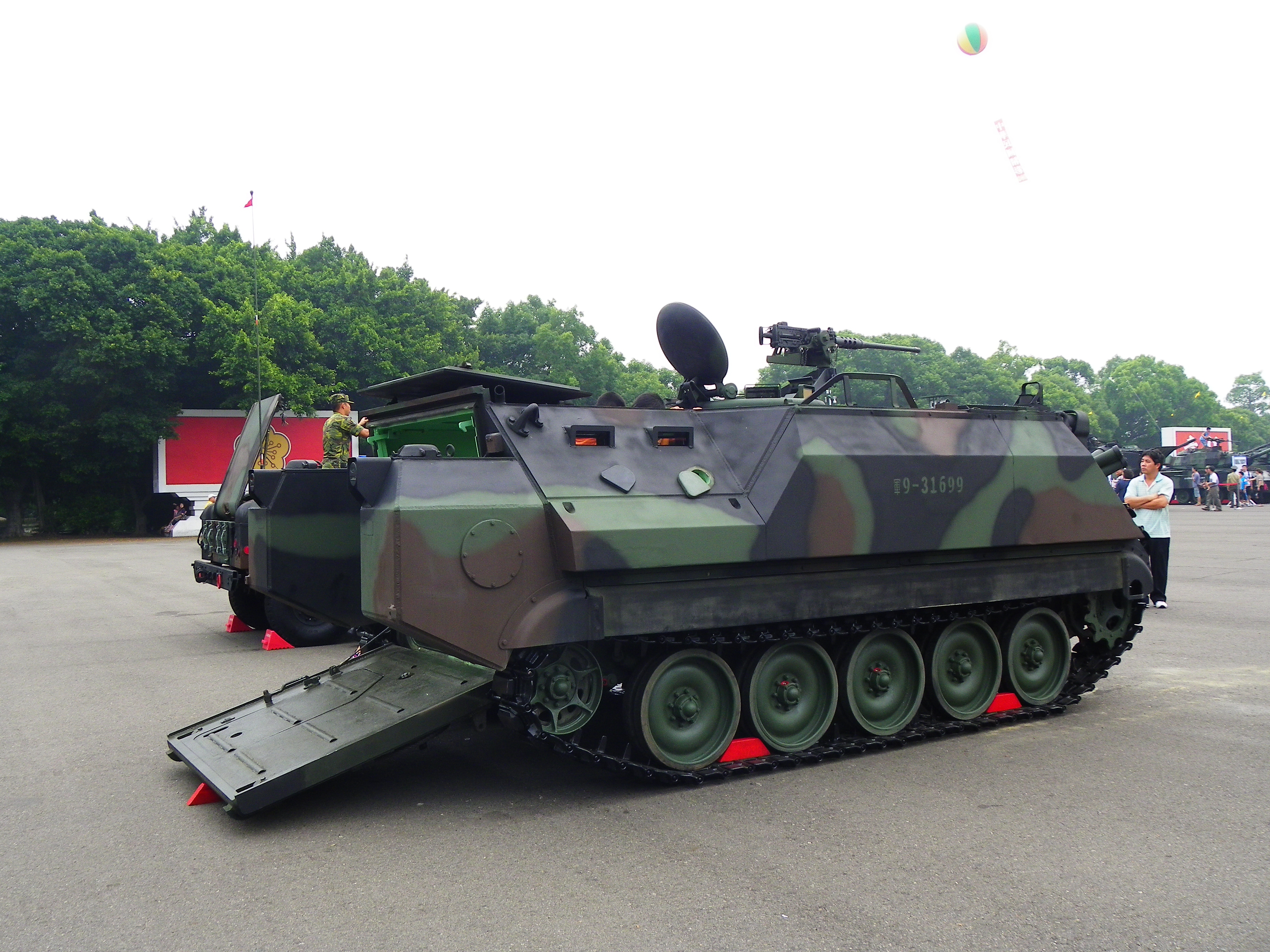
Oblique rear CM21A1

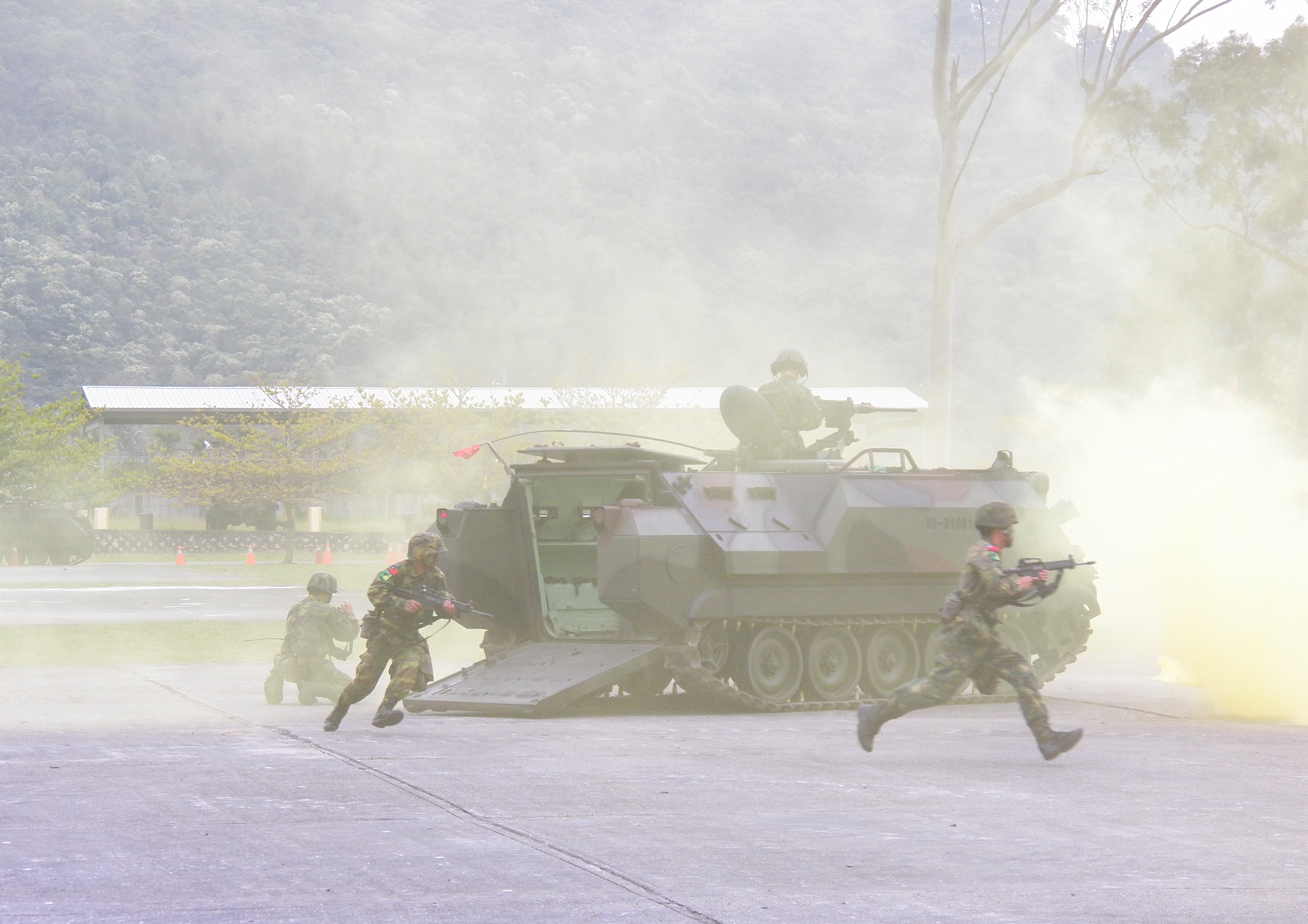
CM21A1 during an exercise

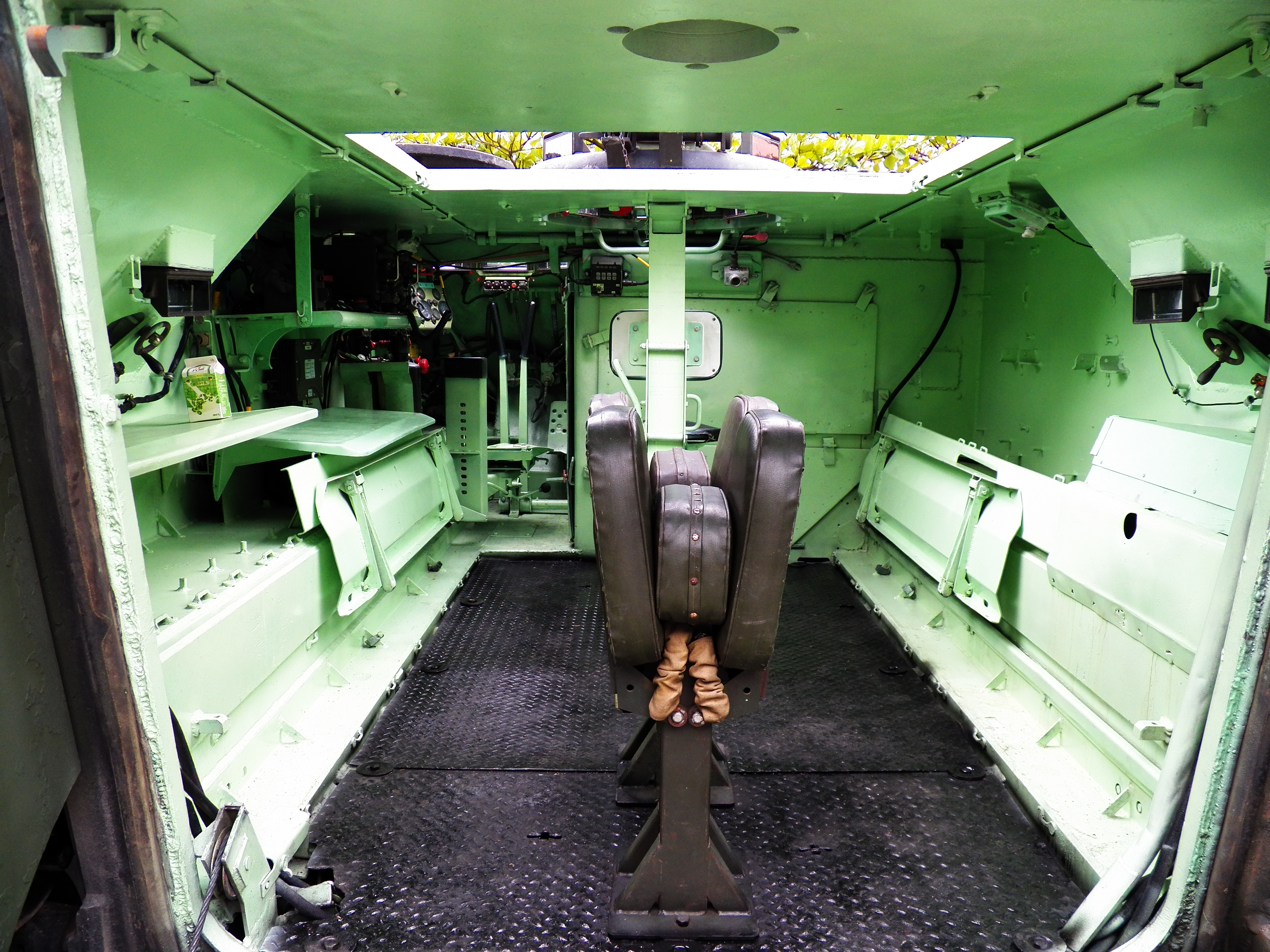
CM21A1 cabin interior

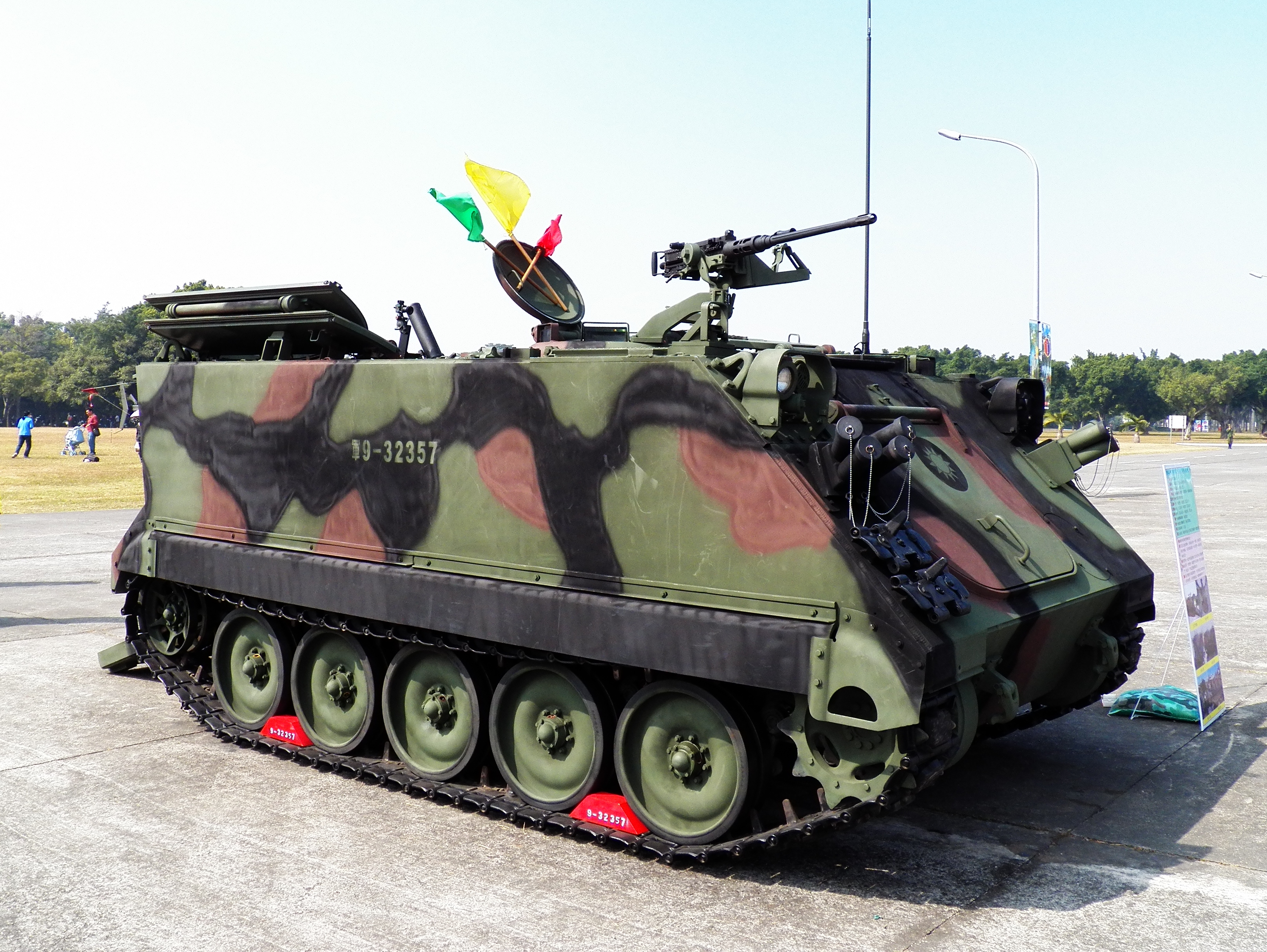
CM23

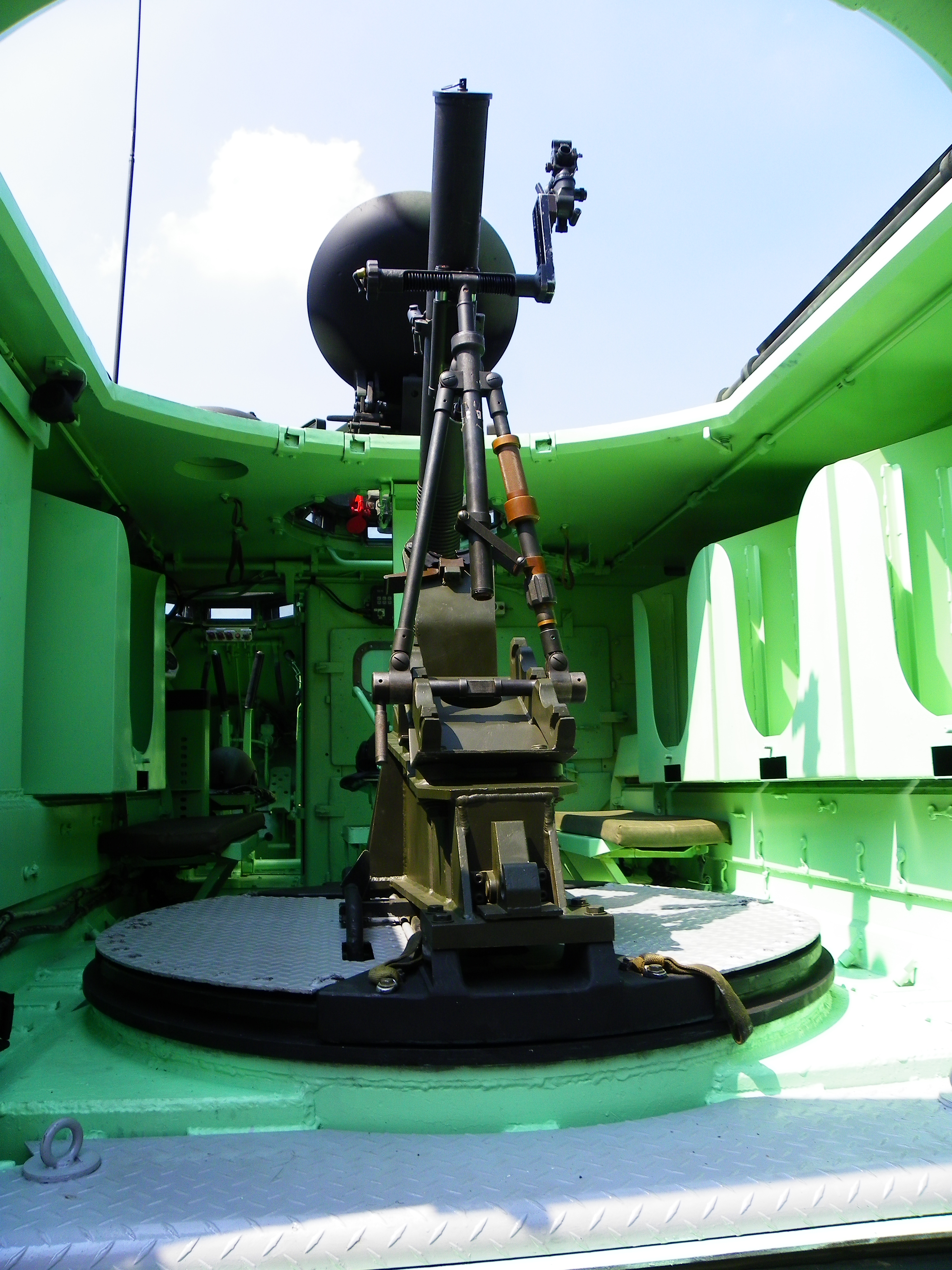
M29 mortar in CM23 mortar carrier cabin

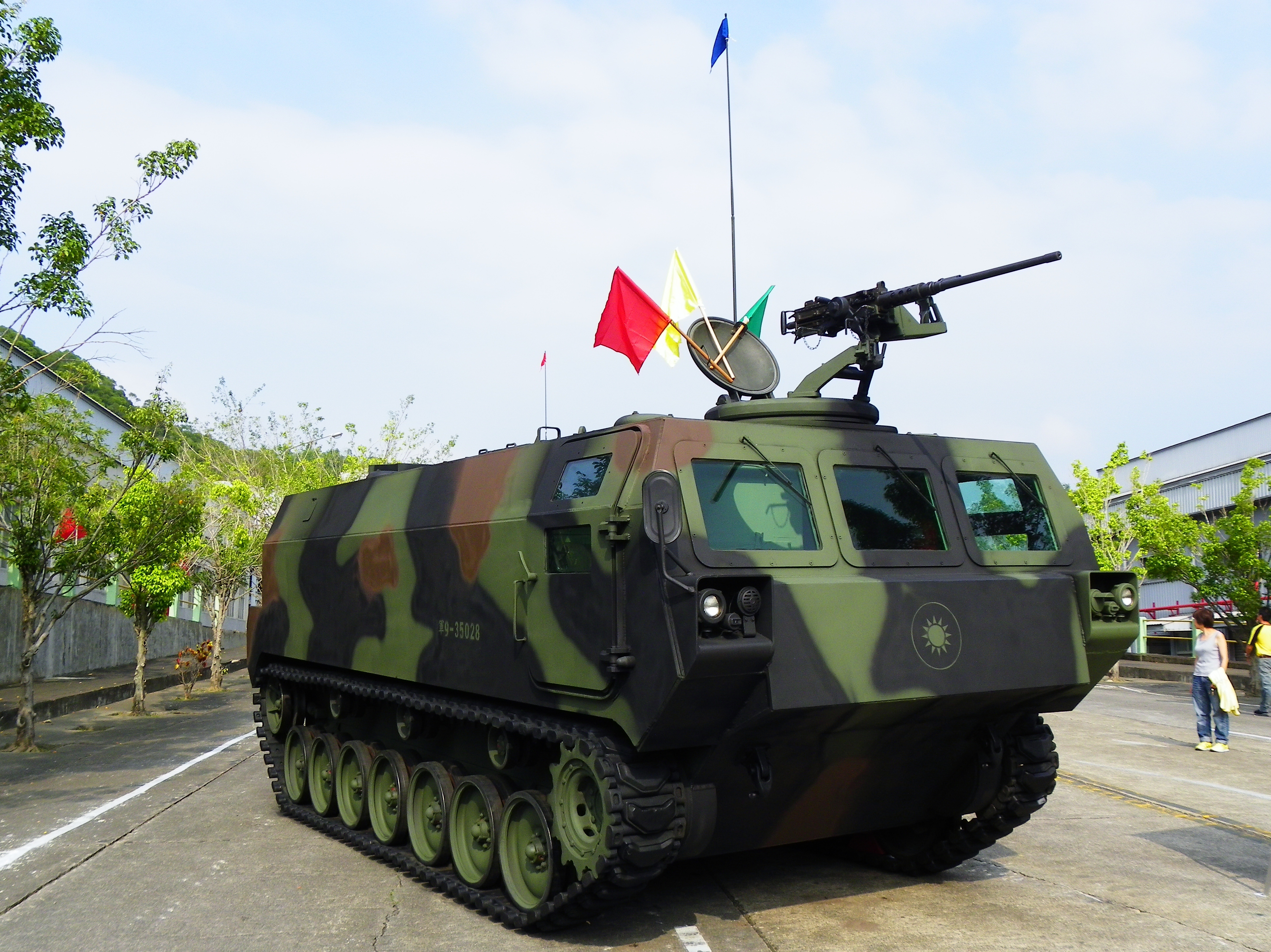
CM24

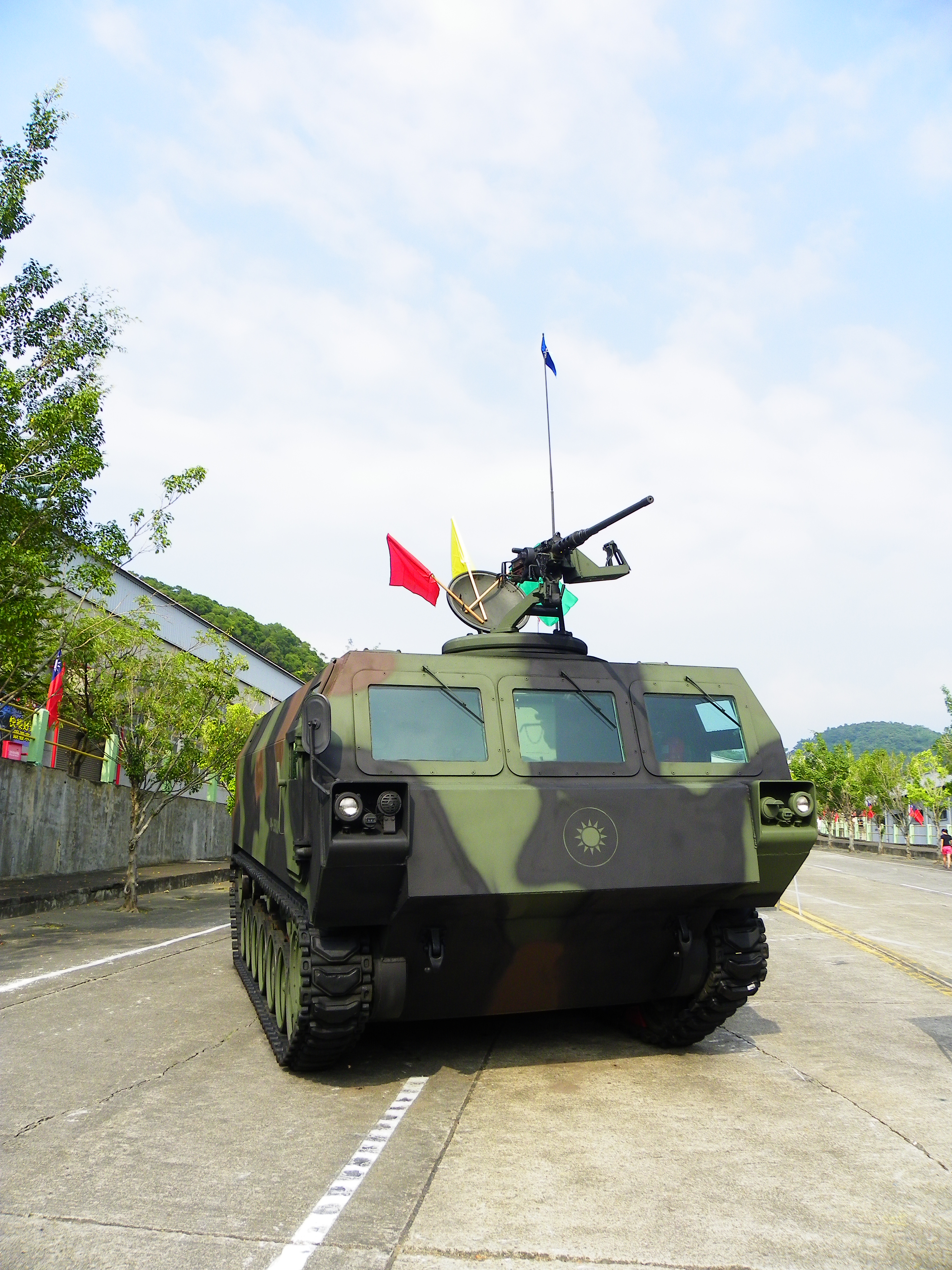
CM24

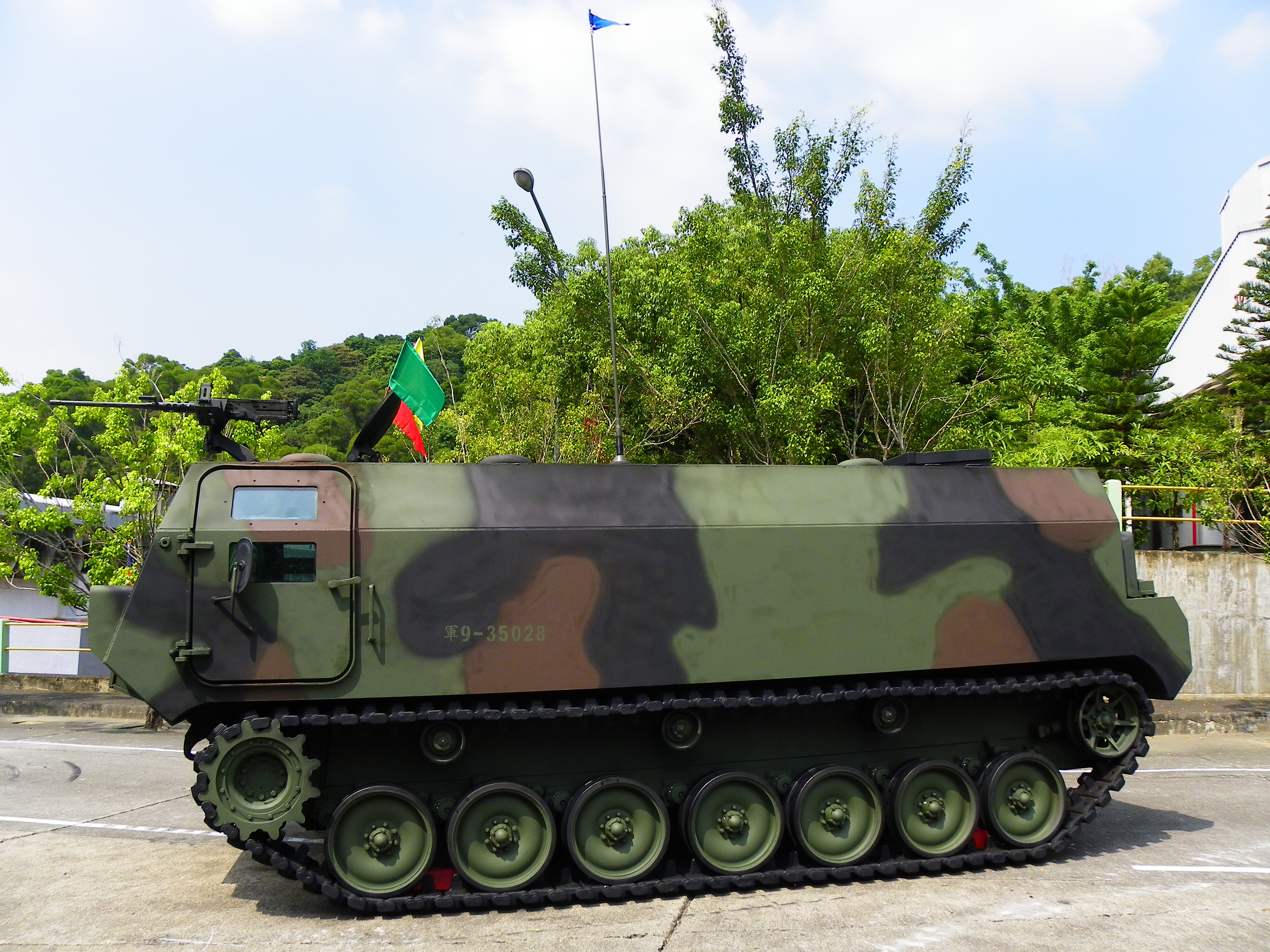
CM24

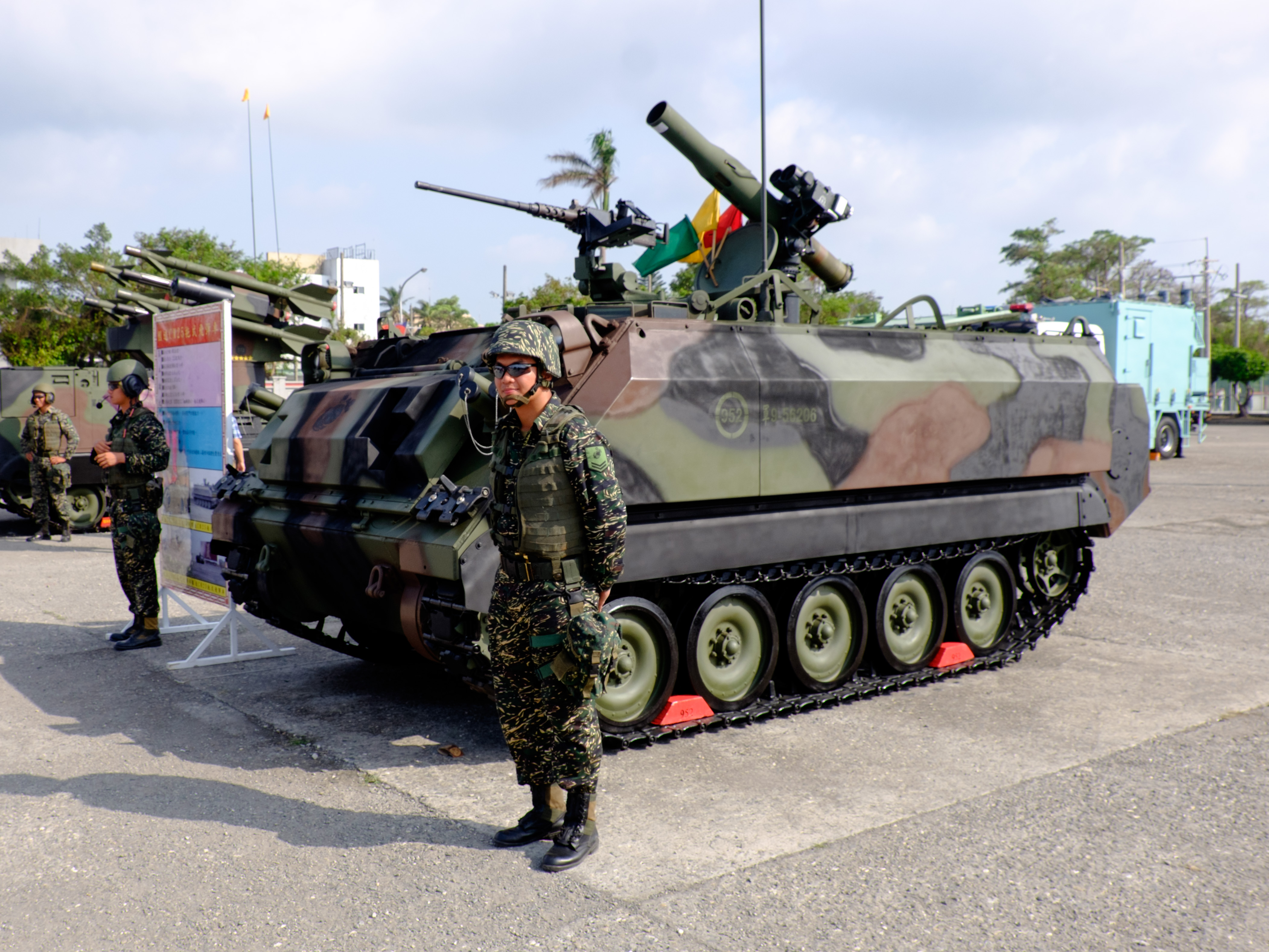
ROCMC CM25

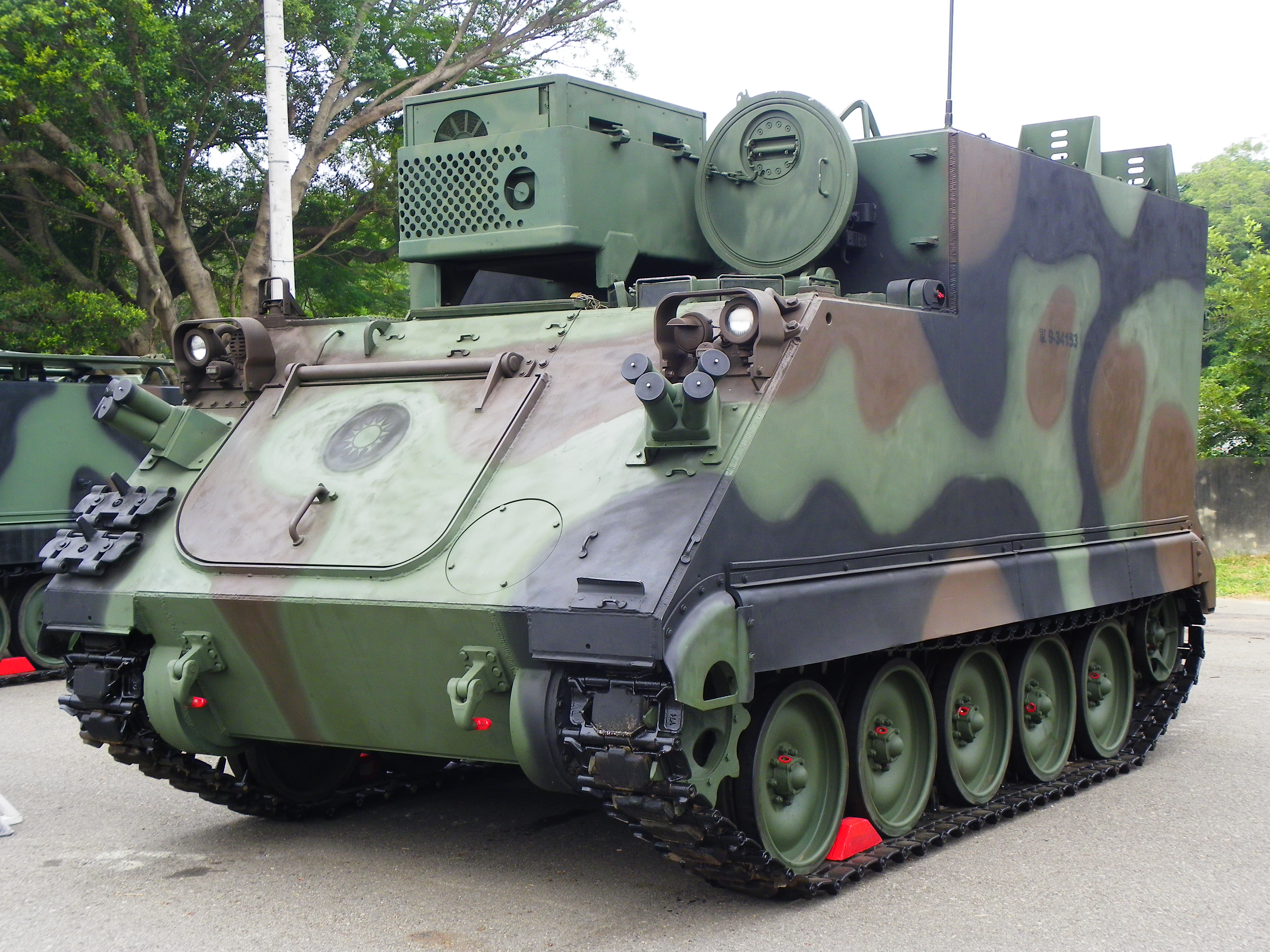
CM26

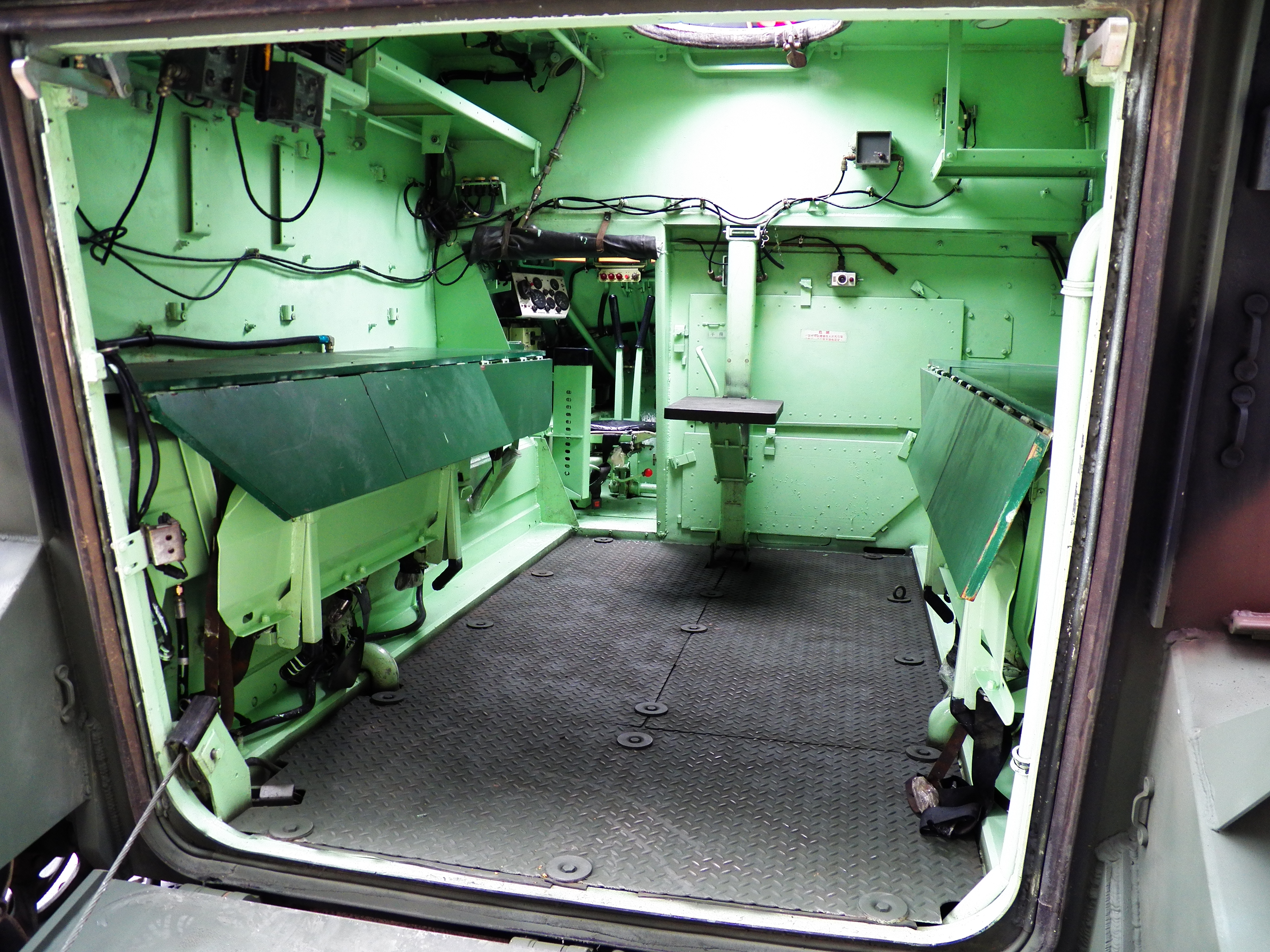
CM26 armored command post carrier cabin interior

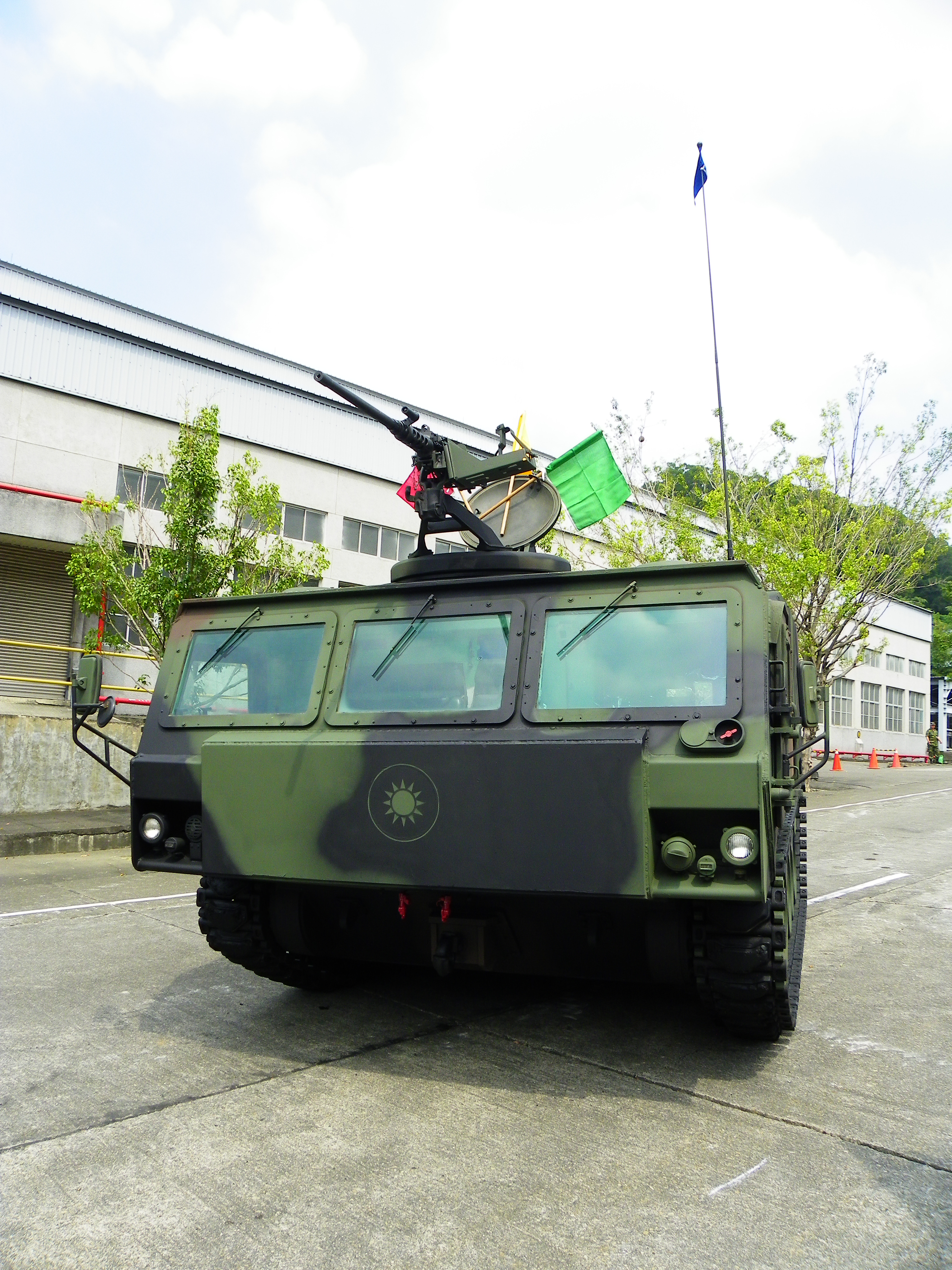
CM27

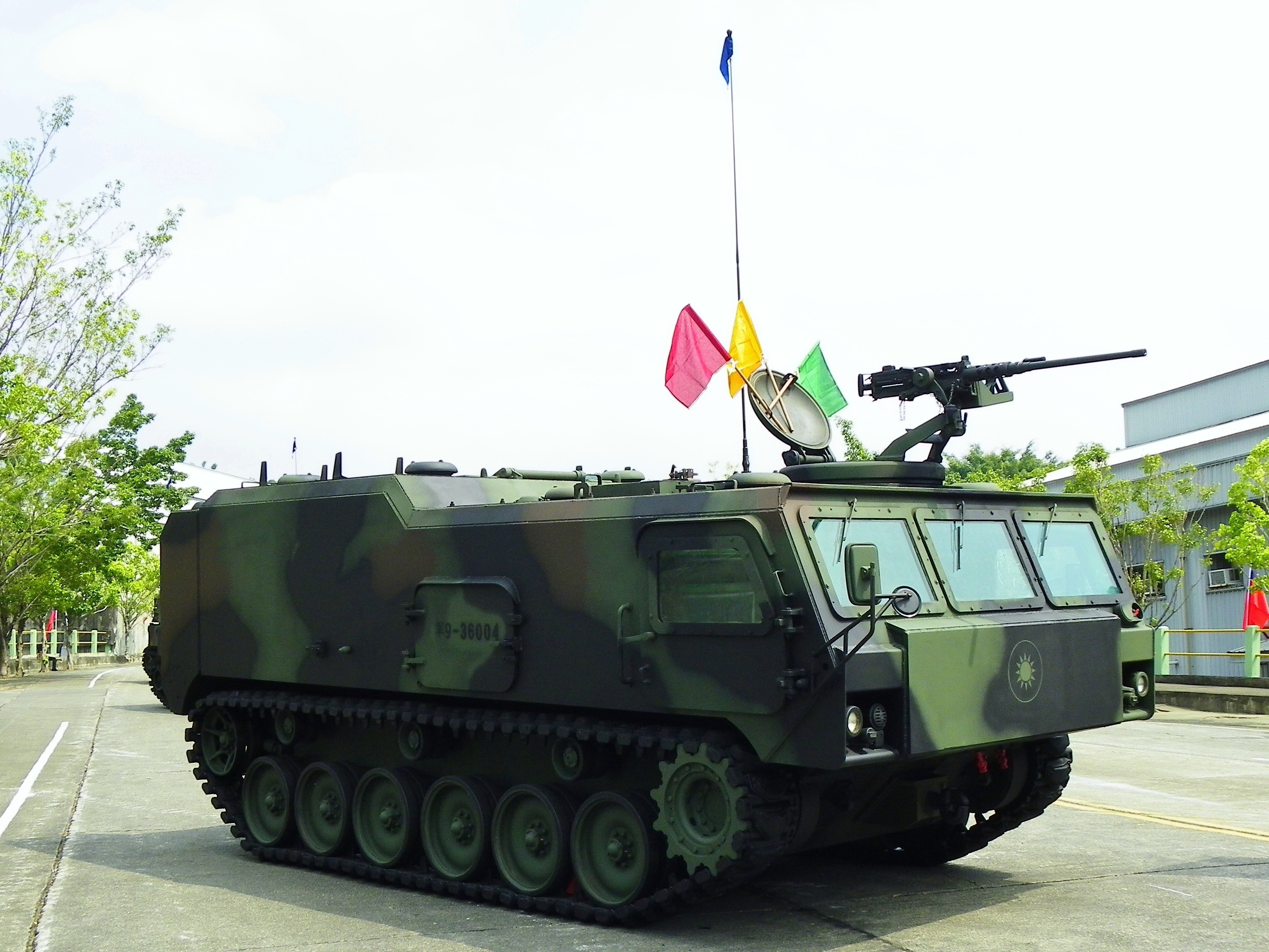
CM27

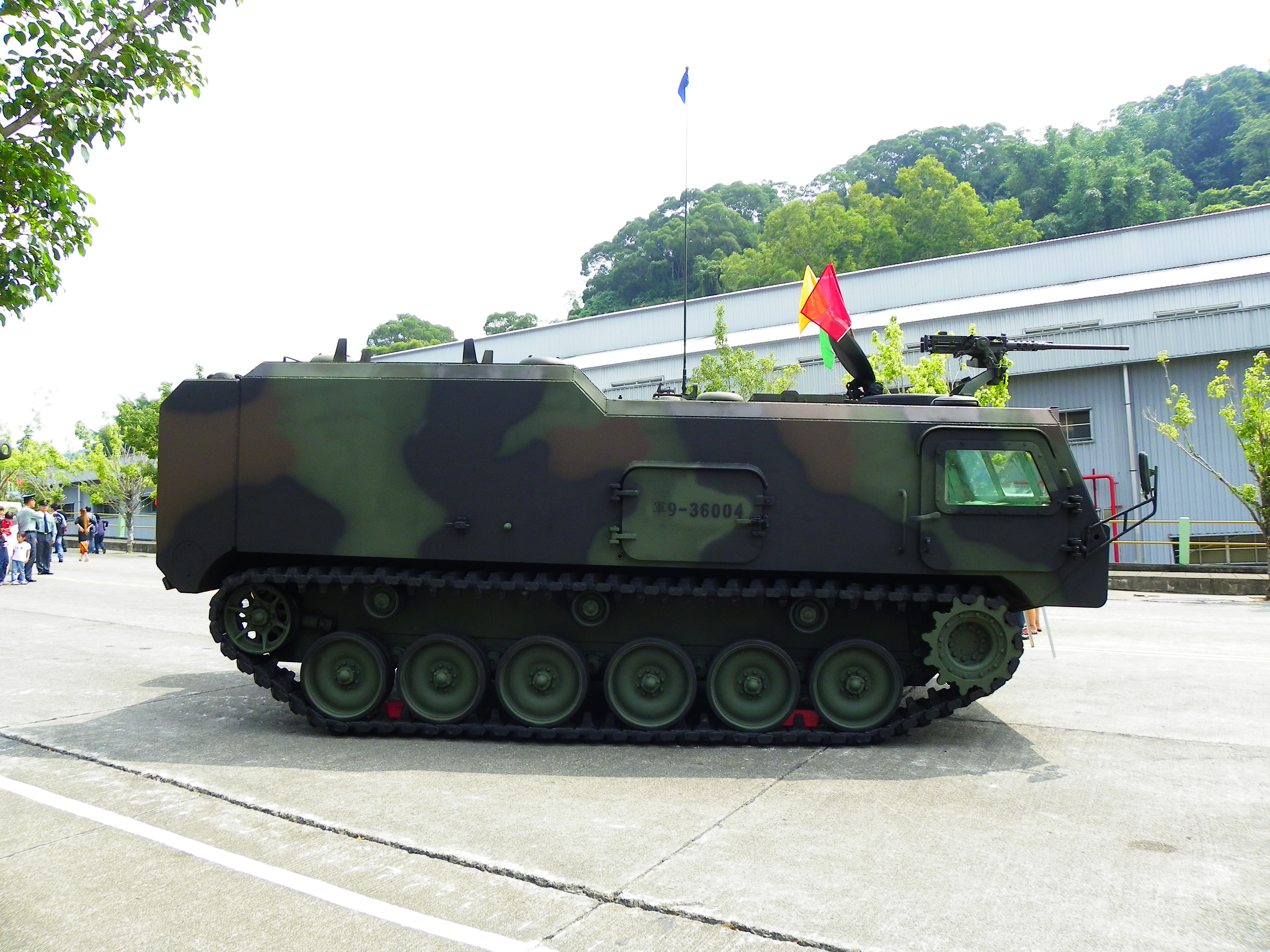
CM27

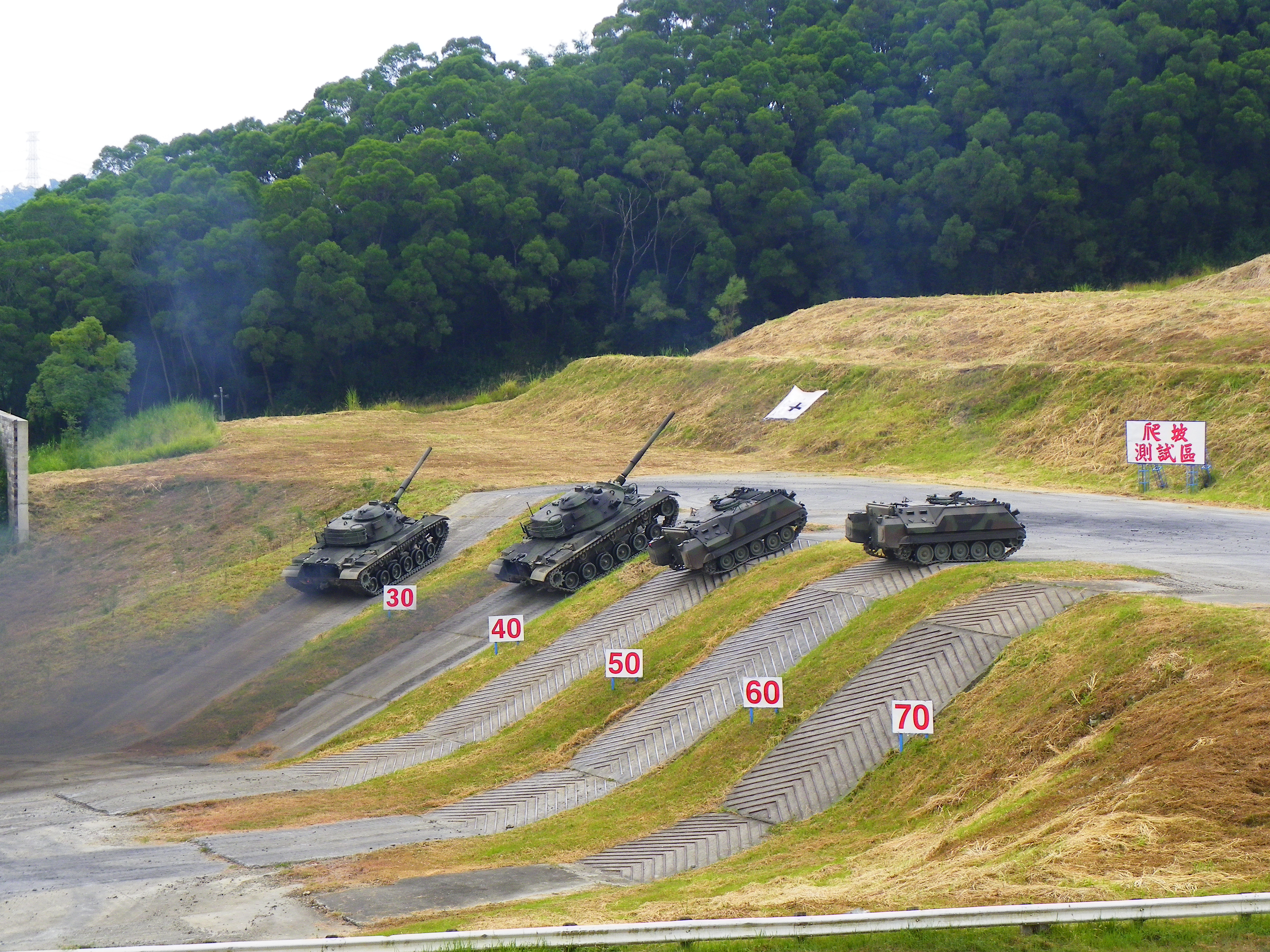
M60A3 TTSs and CM21As climbing slopes

== See also ==
=== Design timeline ===
CM11 Tank · CM12 tank · CM21 armoured vehicle · CM24 ammo carrier · CM31 · CM32
