= CM11 Brave Tiger =

CM11 Brave Tiger M-48H Patton
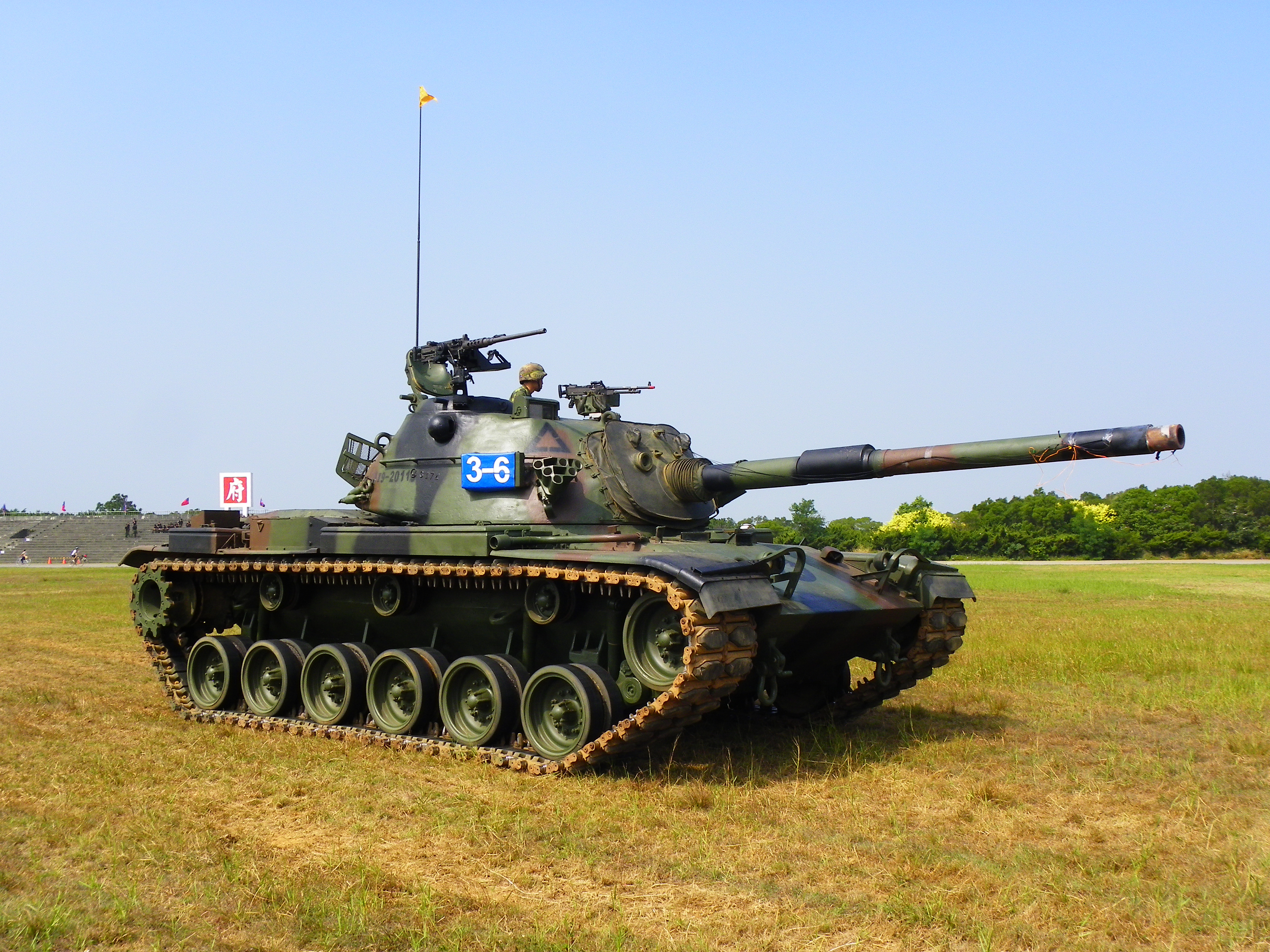
- ROCA CM11 in Hukou Camp after Exercise
- Type: Main battle tank
- Place of origin: Taiwan

Service history
- In service: 1990–present
- Used by: Republic of China Army

Production history
- Designed: 1984
- Manufacturer: Republic of China Armoured Vehicle Development Center
- No. built: 450

Specifications
- Mass: 50 tonnes (55 short tons; 49 long tons)
- Length: 6.95 meters (22 ft 10 in) (hull); 9.30 meters (30 ft 6 in) (cannon forward)
- Width: 3.63 meters (11 ft 11 in)
- Height: 3.09 meters (10 ft 2 in)
- Crew: 4
- Armor: Rolled homogeneous armor
- Main armament: 105 mm (4.1 in) M68A1 gun
- Secondary armament: .50 BMG (12.7×99mm) M2 Browning; 7.62×51mm NATO M240 machine gun
- Engine: Continental AVDS-1790-2C air-cooled Twin-turbo diesel engine 750 hp (560 kW)
- Power/weight: 15 hp/t
- Suspension: Torsion bar suspension
- Operational range: 480 kilometers (300 mi)
- Maximum speed: 48 km/h (30 mph)

The CM11 Brave Tiger (Chinese: 勇虎式戰車; pinyin: yǒnghǔshì zhànchē) is a Taiwanese main battle tank (MBT) that was developed by the American General Dynamics and the Republic of China Army Armored Vehicle Development Center. It was introduced to the public on 14 April 1990. The CM11 is a hybrid M60 chassis fitted with the turret from the older M48 Patton and the fire control system of the M1 Abrams.

== Development history ==
The Republic of China (Taiwan) established the Armored Vehicle Development Center in 1980, and was tasked to develop military armored vehicles, and had cooperated with General Dynamics to develop the CM11. The development of the tank has two main purposes, first was to avoid the limitations set by the US-PRC Joint Communique (17 August Communique), and second was to allow the ROCA to acquire second-generation MBTs.

The CM11 is a hybrid tank using the M48A3 turret with the M60A3 tank hull, combined with the new M1 Abrams tank's fire control system (FCS). The United States designated it as M48H, where the "H" means Hybrid, and the Republic of China designated it CM11 and named it Brave Tiger.

== Design ==
In 1988, two prototypes were finished and 450 CM11 were ordered to be built. The M60A3 hull was procured from the United States in 1987, and the M48A3 turret and the M68A1 105mm main cannon was supplied by the Army Ordnance Maintenance and Development Center. The commander's Israel-made low-profile Urdan cupola was mounted with an M2 Browning 12.7mm (.50 caliber) machine gun, the loader operates an M240 7.62mm machine gun, the coaxial machine gun is also an M240. Both sides of the turret have a M239 smoke grenade launcher mounted, like the M60A3 tank.

=== Advantages ===
The greatest features and advantages of the CM11 are that it has the same level of digital/analog hybrid ballistic calculator as the M1A1 Abrams; it has a two-dimensional sighting and gun stabilization system, more complete than the M60A3's one-dimensional stabilizing device; combining the AN/VSG-2 thermal imager, AN/VVS-2 Image Intensifier, AN/GVS-5 Nd-YAG laser rangefinder, allowing the CM11 to have fire-on-the-move and night combat capabilities. It also has the highest probability of first-round hit compared to all other ROCA tanks.

=== Disadvantages ===
Disadvantages of the CM11 are its outdated design, armor, and gun. The Chinese PLA's second-generation Type 96 tank and its third-generation Type 99 tank are both armed with a 125mm main cannon, which the CM11's armor does not offer significant protection against. The ROCA knew this disadvantage very early, and tried to introduce explosive reactive armor (ERA) from the French company GIAT. However, the weight of the additional ERA installations caused excessive stress on the M60 chassis's torsion bar suspension, so plans to install ERA on the tanks was put on hold until a solution was found. The CM11's 750 hp (560 kW) Continental AVDS-1790-2 V12, air-cooled twin-turbo diesel engine is 60-year-old technology as well, having been introduced in February 1963 with the first 600 U.S. Army converted M48A3s.

During the Spring Festival in 2012, the ROCA's 542 Armor Brigade of 6th Army Corps initiated their combat readiness drill, and showed a CM11 installed with ERA for the first time. Developed by CSIST, angling was applied to the ERA design to reduce the probability of projectiles penetrating the hull.

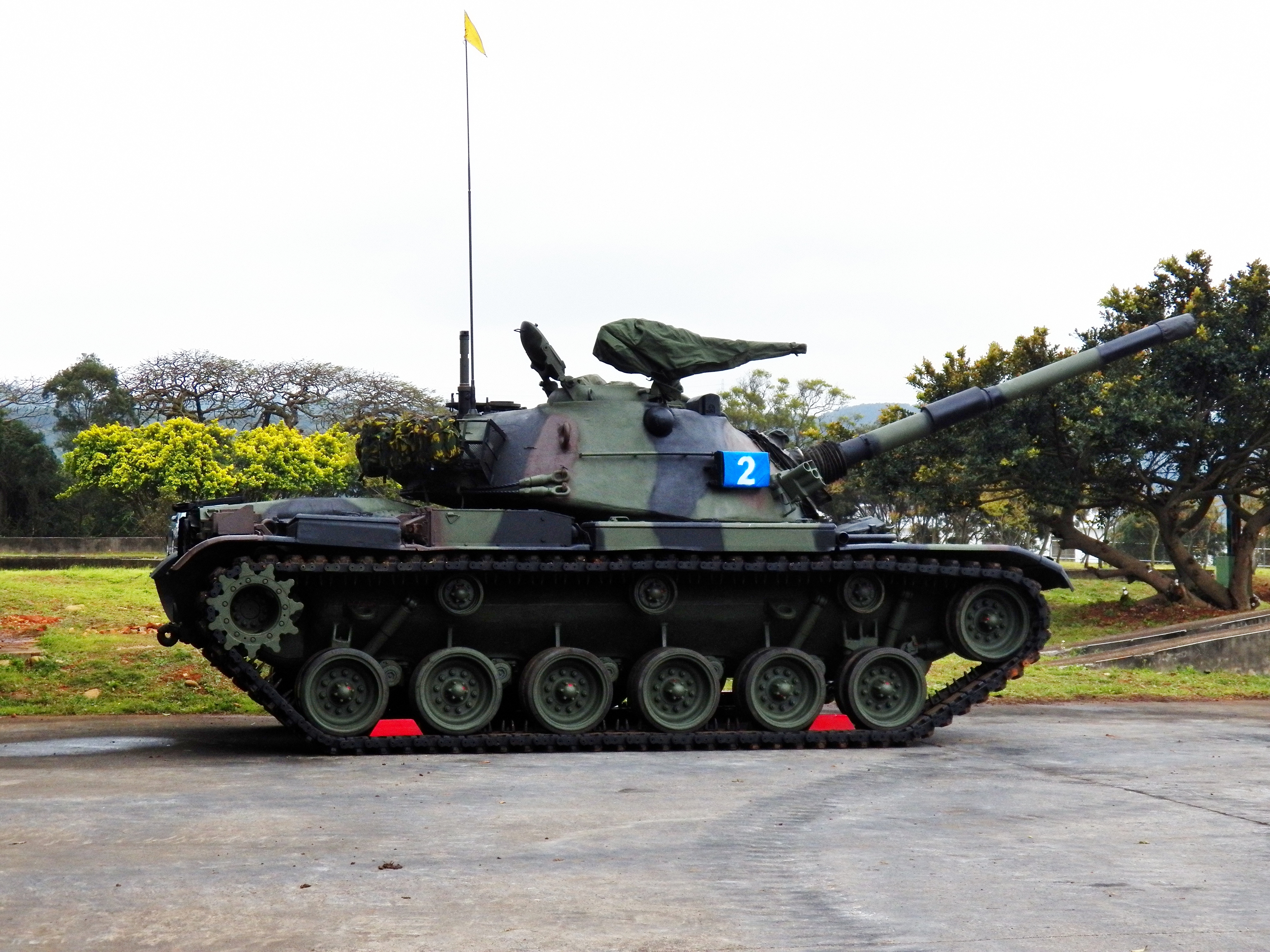
CM11 side view

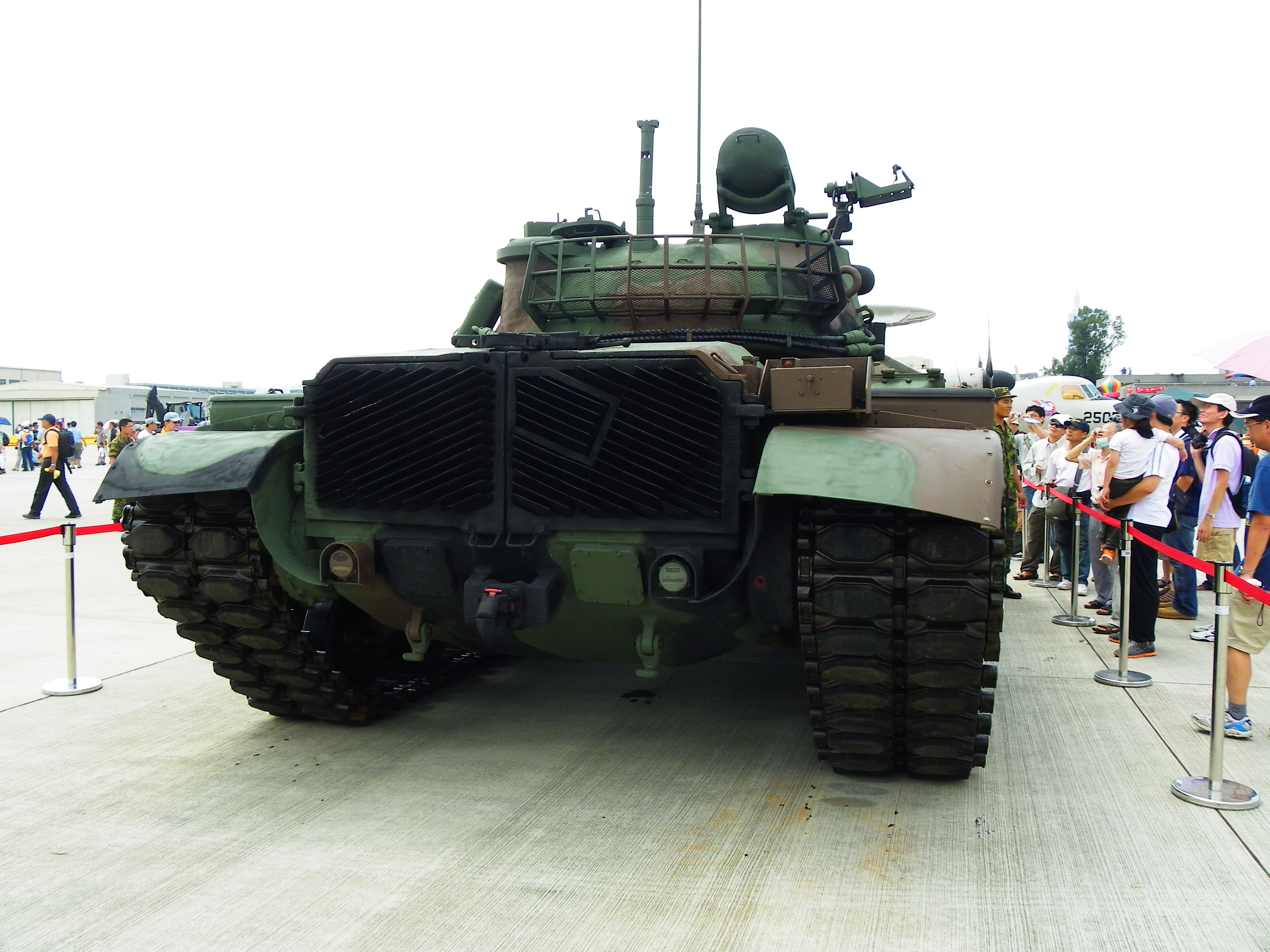
Rear view of CM11

== Upgrade program ==
In 2017, the Taiwanese Ministry of National Defence announced that it had allocated 6.6 million USD to develop upgrades for the country's 450 M60A3 TTS tanks. When the upgrade program was announced, the United Daily News reported that the CM11 fleet would be upgraded after the M60A3 program.

== See also ==
- CM12 tank – (Taiwan)
- M60-2000 – (United States)
