= K2 (disambiguation) =

K2, at 8,611 m (28,251 ft), is the second highest mountain in the world, located in the Karakoram Range.

K2 or K-2 may also refer to:

== Places ==
- Mount K2, an ancillary summit of Mount Kitchener in the Canadian Rockies
- Bambandyanalo, an archaeological site in Zimbabwe
- Kōnāhuanui 2, a summit in Oahu, Hawaii

== Arts, entertainment, and media ==
=== Films ===
- K2 (film), a 1991 film about climbing the mountain based on the play of the same name
- K2: Siren of the Himalayas (2012), an American documentary film directed by Dave Ohlson

=== Literature ===
- K2 (manga), a manga series by Kazuo Mafune and sequel to Super Doctor K
- K2 (play), a play by Patrick Meyers about climbing the mountain
- List of books about K2

=== Music ===
==== Groups ====
- K2 (Serbian band), a sibling duo
- Kee Marcello's K2, a hard rock band

==== Albums ====
- K2 (K2 album) (1995)
- K2 (Kerfuffle album) (2005)
- K2 - Tales of Triumph and Tragedy, a 1988 album by Don Airey

==== Songs ====
- "K2", a 1983 song by Tony Banks from The Fugitive
- "K2", a 2017 song by Elbow from Little Fictions
- "K2", a 2024 song by Liquid Mike from Paul Bunyan's Slingshot

=== Television ===
- K2 (TV channel), an Italian television channel
- The K2, a 2016 South Korean television series

=== Other uses in arts, entertainment, and media ===
- K2 (board game)
- Kill Me, Kiss Me or K2, a Korean comic series
- K-2SO, a character in the Star Wars movie Rogue One

== Brands and enterprises ==
- Synthetic cannabinoids, which are colloquially known as and commonly sold under the name "K2"
- K2, second model of Larcum Kendall's clocks for navigation
- K2 Co., Ltd., Japanese video game developer owned by Capcom
- K2 Sports, American manufacturer of skiing, sliding, and rolling-sports equipment
- K2 Telecom, Ugandan mobile network operator in Uganda
- K2VC, Chinese venture capital firm
- Pentax K2, a camera model related to the Pentax K1000

== Military ==
- K2 (airbase) or Karshi-Khanabad Air Base, an airbase in southeast Uzbekistan, between 2001 and 2005 used by the United States Air Force
- K-2, a circa-1938 airship
- Daewoo K-2, an assault rifle of the Republic of Korea Army
- K2 battlecruiser, a preliminary design in the studies leading up to the G3 battlecruiser
- K2 Black Panther, a South Korean main battle tank
- USS K-2 (SS-33), a 1913 United States Navy K-class submarine
- K2, a K-class sloop of the Royal Netherlands Navy
- Kalinin K-2, Soviet airliner

== Science and healthcare ==
- K2, a mission of the Kepler spacecraft, also known as "Second Light"
- K2, a street name for synthetic cannabinoids
- K_{2}, a group in algebraic K-theory
- C/2017 K2, a non-periodic comet
- Haplogroup K2, human group sharing a Y-chromosome characteristic, a.k.a. haplogroup T
- Vitamin K_{2}
- Kardashev-2, a hypothetical civilization that uses all of the energy emitted by a star

== Structures ==
- K2 (building), a residential & commercial building in Leeds, United Kingdom
- K2 Leisure Centre, a sports centre in Crawley, West Sussex

== Transportation ==
- K-2 (Kansas highway)
- K2, a two-seater Sprint kayak
- Eurolot, defunct airline that had IATA code K2
- K2 Airways, Pakistani cargo airline with IATA code K2
- Furness Railway K2, a 4-4-0 steam locomotive class
- LNER Class K2, a class of British steam locomotives
- GSR Class K2, a class of Irish 2-6-0 steam locomotives
- London Buses route K2, a Transport for London bus route
- PRR K2, a Pennsylvania Railroad locomotive classification
- Tatra K2, a 1966 Czechoslovak articulated tramcar
- Kia K2, a Chinese car produced by Dongfeng Yueda Kia

== Other uses ==
- K2 (tax scheme), a Jersey tax avoidance scheme
- K2, a version of the red telephone box in the UK
- K2 League, a Korea league for association football

== See also ==
- K02 or Mobile Police Command, a unit under the Vietnam People's Public Security Force
- KATU, an ABC affiliate assigned to Portland, Oregon
- KTOO (disambiguation)
- KTWO (disambiguation)
- KK (disambiguation)
- 2K (disambiguation)
