= K2 Black Panther =

South Korean main battle tank

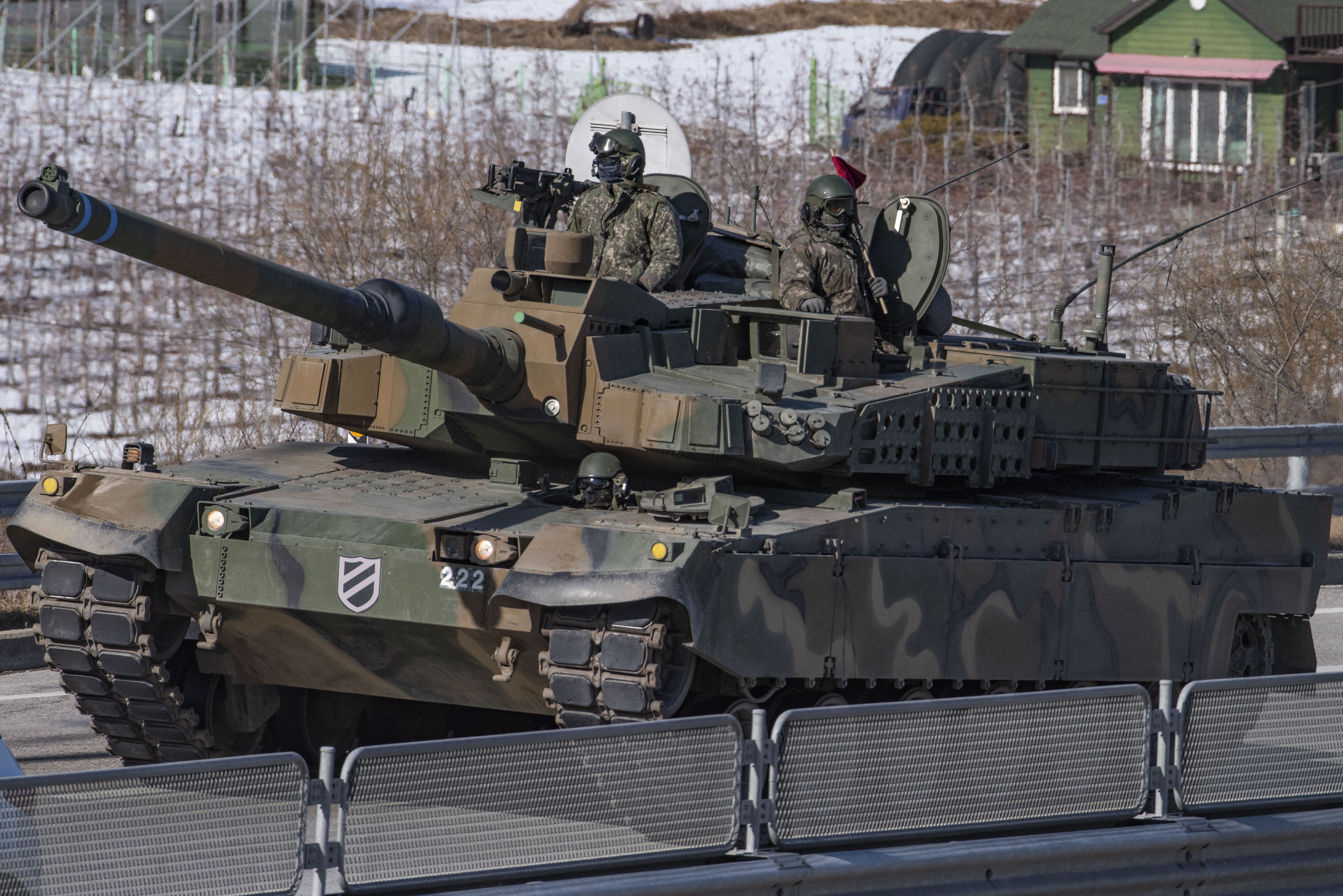
- A Republic of Korea Army K2 Black Panther assigned to the 112th Mechanized Infantry Battalion moves during a joint exercise.
- Type: Main battle tank
- Place of origin: South Korea

Service history
- In service: 2014–present
- Used by: See Operators

Production history
- Designer: Agency for Defense Development; Hyundai Rotem; Poongsan Corporation; Hanwha Systems; Samyang Comtech; Hyundai WIA; Doosan Mottrol
- Designed: 1995–2008
- Manufacturer: Hyundai Rotem
- Unit cost: ₩7.8 billion (production batch 1); US$8.5 million (constant 2009 USD)
- Produced: 2008–present
- No. built: Republic of Korea Army: Batch I: 100, Batch II: 106, Batch III: 54, Batch IV: 150 (ordered); Polish Land Forces: Batch I: 180, Batch II: 180 (ordered); Total: 440

Specifications
- Mass: Curb weight: 55 metric tons (54 long tons; 61 short tons); Combat weight: 56 metric tons (55 long tons; 62 short tons)
- Length: Overall: 10.8 meters (35 ft 5 in); Chassis: 7.5 meters (24 ft 7 in)
- Width: 3.6 meters (11 ft 10 in)
- Height: Highest: 2.4 meters (7 ft 10 in); Lowest: 2 meters (6 ft 7 in)
- Crew: 3 (commander, gunner and driver)
- Armor: MIL-12560H armor steel and silicon carbide non-oxide ceramic plate along with ERA add-on armor
- Main armament: Hyundai WIA CN08 120 mm 55 caliber smoothbore gun (40 rounds, 16 available in the bustle autoloader)
- Secondary armament: 1× 12.7×99mm NATO K6 heavy machine gun (3,200 rounds); 1× 7.62×51mm NATO coaxial machine gun (12,000 rounds)
- Engine: Batch I: STX Engine/MTU Friedrichshafen MT883 Ka-501 4-short stroke, 12-cylinder water-cooled diesel, dry weight: 2,064 kg 1,500 hp (1,103 kW); Batch II-IV: HD Hyundai Infracore DV27K 4-long stroke, 12-cylinder water-cooled diesel, dry weight: 2,550 kg 1,500 hp (1,110 kW)
- Power/weight: 27.3 hp/t (20.35 kW/t)
- Transmission: Batch I-III: RENK HSWL 295 TM (5 forward, 5 reverse gears), dry weight: 2,450 kg; Batch IV: SNT Dynamics EST15K (6 forward, 3 reverse gears), dry weight: 2,500 kg
- Suspension: Semi-active in-arm suspension unit (ISU) with dynamic track tension system (DTTS)
- Fuel capacity: 1,296 liters (342 U.S. gal)
- Operational range: 450 km (280 mi)
- Maximum speed: Paved road: 70 km/h (43 mph); Cross country: 50 km/h (31 mph); Acceleration from 0–32 km/h (0–20 mph) in 7.47 seconds (MT883 Ka-501) or 8.77 seconds (DV27K)

K2 Black Panther (Korean: K-2 흑표; Hanja: K-2 黑豹; RR: K-2 Heukpyo) is a South Korean fourth-generation main battle tank (MBT), designed by the Agency for Defense Development and manufactured by Hyundai Rotem. The tank's design began in the 1990s to meet the strategic requirements of the Republic of Korea Army's reform for three-dimensional, high-speed maneuver warfare based on use of network-centric warfare.

Over its predecessor, the K1, the K2 features improved protection, mobility, firepower, increased indigenous production, and crew operability. The focus of the design places emphasis on lower weight, higher mobility and increased modularity. The K2 Black Panther also acquired several modern features such as extensive integration of Vetronics, advanced sensors, space optimization, and increased automation.

Development of the K2 entered System Concept Research phase in 1995, Exploratory development from 1998 to 2002, and started Full Scale Development in June 2003. Development of the vehicle excluding the powerpack concluded in 2008, following trials by the army. Work on the domestic powerpack kept the tanks from entering service until in 2012, when 100 EuroPowerPacks were implemented on the first production batch. The first 6 K2 Black Panthers entered service with the Republic of Korea Army on June 29, 2014.

== History ==
=== Development ===
South Korea has been accumulating tank development and production technology to increase its self-reliance in producing arms. In 1976, South Korea upgraded its M48 Patton tanks. In 1987, the K1 88-Tank, designed by General Dynamics Land Systems (GDLS), was commissioned for service. South Korea participated in its development, and gained tank production and partial development capabilities. The K1 was a derivative of the M1 Abrams, designed by Americans and produced in South Korea, and its associated legal agreements limited South Korea's rights for export, logistics, and future enhancements.

In the early 1990s, Korean engineers suggested producing a new domestically designed tank using the latest available technology, but the military refused due to cost overruns. Instead, South Korea chose to upgrade the K1, and received a technical data upgrade package from GDLS. However, it was limiting its involvement to strengthen its Defense industrial base while taking responsibility for possible failure. South Korea advanced in turret designs, fire-control systems, sights, and composite armor during this process. The operational prototype of the new variant K1A1 was later displayed in 1996, but the 1997 Asian financial crisis delayed its mass production. South Korea worked on further localization during the delay and managed to develop its own designs or produce most parts of the K1A1 under license.

While K1A1 development was ongoing, South Korea began to plan a new domestic main battle tank as its tank design and manufacturing capability matured. There were three main reasons for the development of the new tank:

Firstly, despite the increase in localization, K1A1 was still an American design that falls under the United States' export control to protect intellectual rights, which creates a burden when exporting.

Secondly, the M48A3K and the M48A5K operated by the South Korean military were aging designs and needed to be replaced with newer, improved designs.

Thirdly, the Republic of Korea Army was adapting new tactics called three-dimensional high-speed maneuver warfare with network-centric warfare. When developers asked the Army what kind of performance the Army wanted to see with the new tank, the Army replied that network warfare capability for command and control is the top priority, not firepower, defense, or mobility. This new capability would need to be built into the new tank.

Criticism was made on the new tank developments: "It seemed to many to be too early to adopt a new model, and there were also doubts because it would be the first tank ever designed domestically." However, consensus of the defense sector (the politicians, the military, and developers) viewed the K1 tanks as a "humiliation", because the tank itself was a proof that South Korea lacked in tank developing technology. It was a matter of national pride to have the ability to design and build a leading main battle tank.

Developers claimed that during times of war, military logistics and support of armaments could stop when geopolitics came into play, as witnessed in the Middle East and Eastern Europe. There were also criticisms of many European nations as lacking investment in domestic warfare technology, and relying too much on weapons from partnerships. Historically, South Korea always maintained a policy of self-reliance on weapons, and so the new tank program was authorized.

From July 1995 to December 1997, system concept research was conducted including analysis of required operational capability (ROC), function, performance, operations, logistics, and the technology required. The first step was to develop a modeling and simulation system for theoretical study and analysis. South Korean developers invited experts from around the world, including Sven Berge (Stridsvagn 103), Philip Lett (M1 Abrams), Israel Tal (Merkava), Hayashi Iwao (Type 90), and Richard Ogorkiewicz (European tanks) for a 40-hour seminar to help guide the concepts of the new tank development. Per prior agreement, all the presentations were recorded, and used for guiding system development of the new tank. Then seven researchers of the Agency for Defense Development (ADD), who were responsible for designing the tank, were sent to the United Kingdom for a year of tank development education.

From November 1998 to December 2002, private companies joined the ADD during exploratory research, and developed core technologies and systems including the tank gun, the electric gun and turret drive system (EGTDS), and the gun autoloader. Other key systems and tests included automatic target detection & tracking, and cognitive identification ability of the combat control system along with its simulator, the semi-active in-arm suspension unit to dramatically increase mobility performance, and the proximity fuse (within 7 meters) for multi-purpose HEAT munition (to shoot down helicopters).

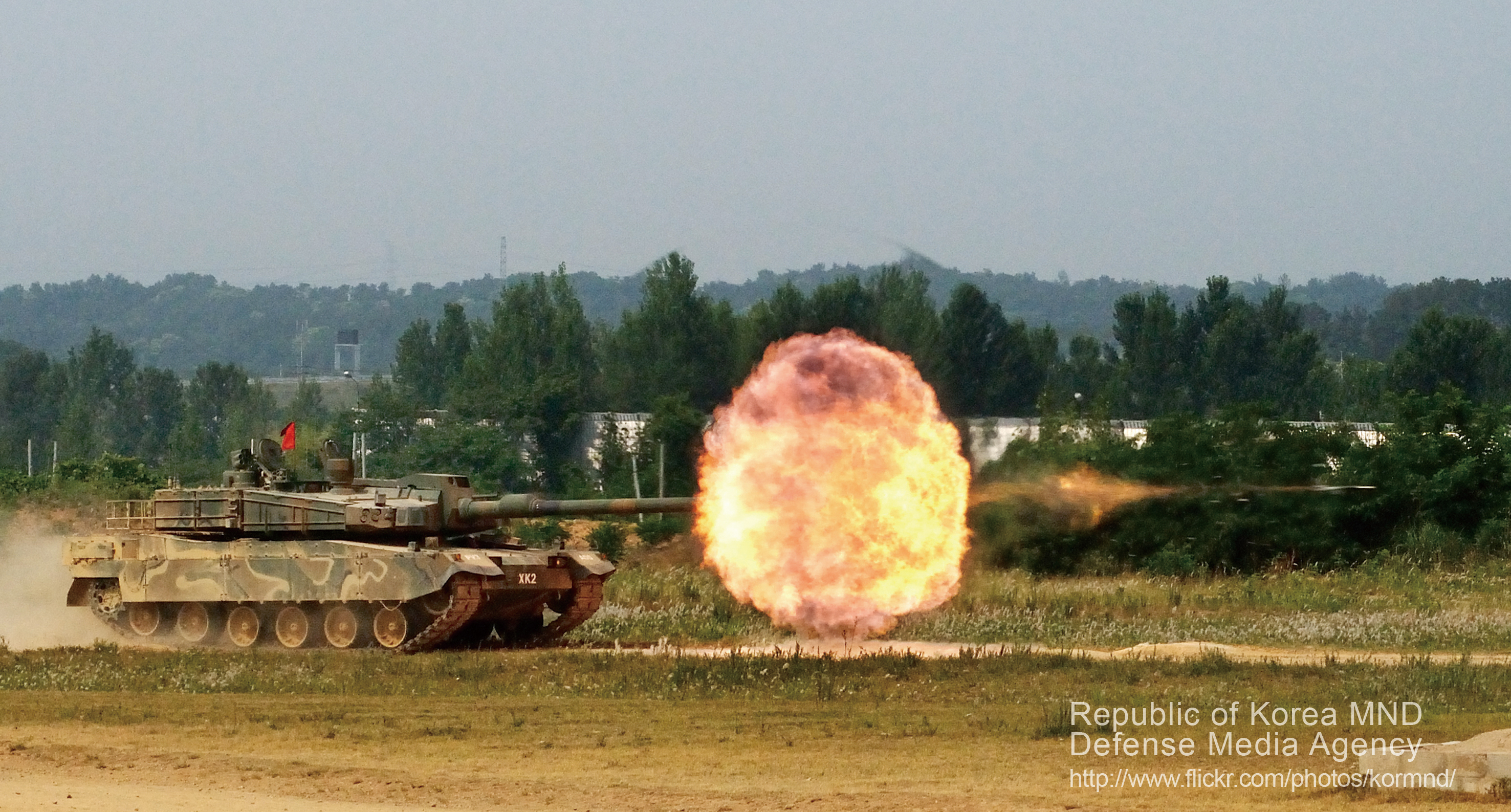
XK2 PV3 firing its cannon

In 2002, Hilmi Özkök, the commander of Turkish Land Forces, visited the research center and witnessed the simulator capabilities and an actual model of the combat control system. Afterward, Turkey continuously sent its dignitaries to closely monitor progress, and it eventually led to cooperation in developing Turkey's Altay.

From January 2003 to 2007, a number of test vehicles were built: two test vehicles, the MTR (Mobility Test Rig) and FTR (Firepower Test Rig), and three PV (Pilot Vehicles) were built to demonstrate technology and performance. MTR and FTR conducted mobility, fire control, combat control, and low temperature operating life tests, while PV1, PV2, and PV3 conducted tests on endurance, developer, operator, and integrated logistics support. The last prototype was unveiled on 2 March 2007 at the proving ground in Changwon, and the development was officially completed after being declared fit for combat by the Defense Acquisition Program Administration (DAPA) in September 2008. The XK2 development project, which began in 1995 and ended in 2008, cost a total of 452.6 billion won spread over 14 years.

=== Improvement ===
In 2020, Samyang Comtech, which produces composite armors, began developing an improvement of front armors for K2 export variants, and later it changed to a modification and development project to completely improve the modular armor for export variants organized by the Defense Agency for Technology and Quality (DTaQ) in 2021.

The third mass-produced K2, which began in 2022, included an improved Battlefield Management System with the Korean Variable Message Format (KVMF), and the Korean Commander's Panoramic Sight (KCPS) and Korean Gunner's Primary Sight (KGPS) with improved resolution and daytime automatic target tracking function.

== Design ==
=== Weapon system and munitions ===
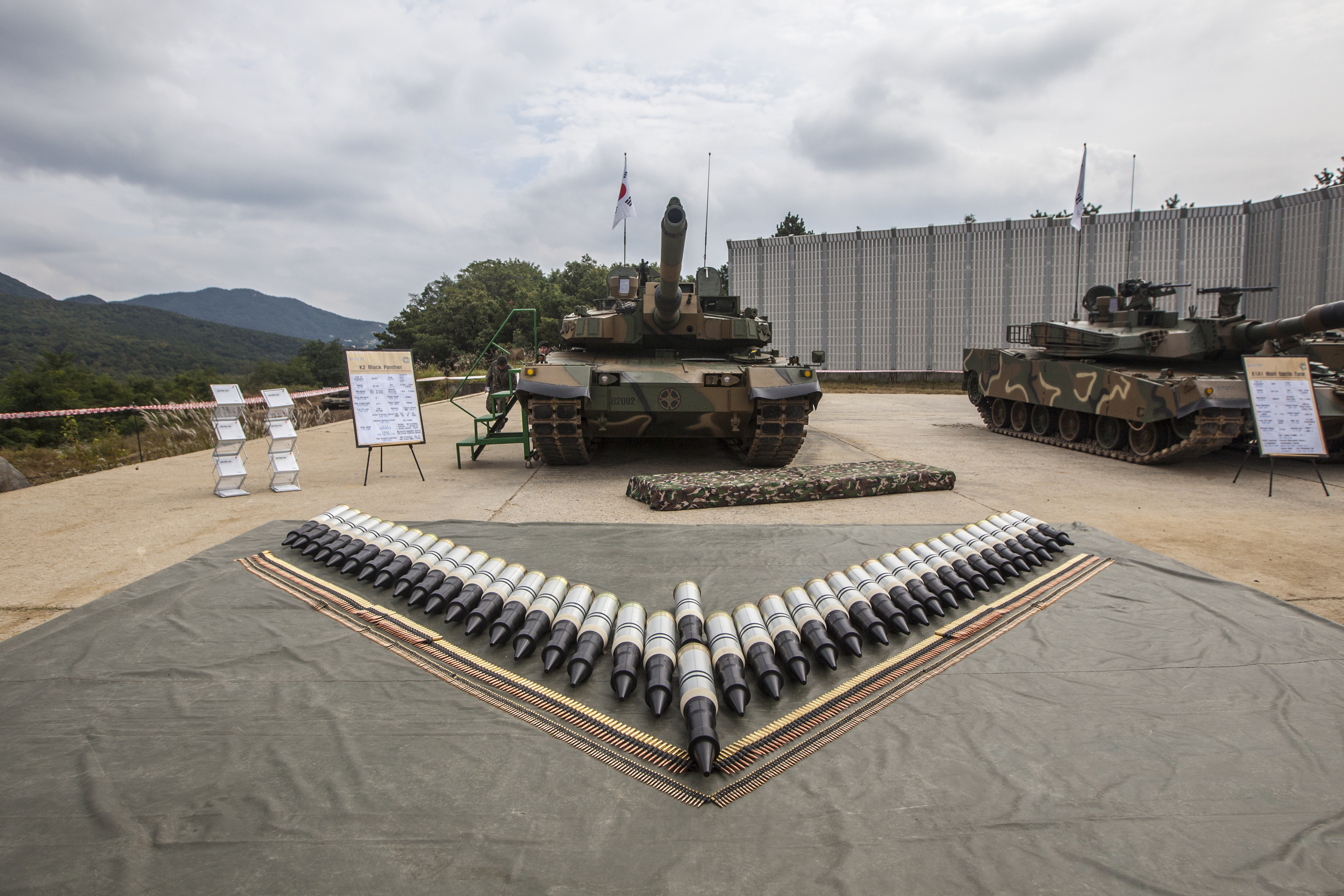
A K2 tank on display along with its K280 HEAT-MP-T munition rounds and K6 heavy machine gun rounds

The main gun and its munitions were developed simultaneously. In the early to mid 1990s, South Korea learned internal ballistics, external ballistics, and terminal ballistics for tank guns while license producing the KM256 tank gun; they invented self-sharpening tungsten penetrator for 120 mm APFSDS munitions during the K1A1 program. Using acquired technology, engineers decided to increase firepower with longer gun barrels and enhanced propellants that were NATO compatible.

Compared to the 5.3 meters (17 ft) long 44 caliber KM256, the new gun was 6.6 meters (22 ft) in length and sent out projectiles at 12–13 megajoules (3.3–3.6 kWh), which was a huge increase from 8–9 megajoules (2.2–2.5 kWh). Since the projectile travels at hypersonic speed or at a muzzle velocity of 1,760 m/s (with K279), it was critical to develop HEAT resistance material and stabilization of the projectile. Early designs included an unmanned turret variant, which was scrapped in favor of a manned turret during initial exploratory development. Another plan was to equip Rheinmetall's experimental NPzK-140 140 mm smoothbore gun, but this plan was also scrapped due to issues regarding incomplete combustion of 140 mm munitions.

South Korea originally planned to receive technology transfer of chrome plating on tank guns from Switzerland, only a handful of nations having such technology. However, the plan was changed to domestic development after hearing the refusal from Swiss firm. Engineers first tried chrome plating on the KM256 tank gun used by K1A1, then coincidentally found a classified method while reworking on defect-plated guns.

The Black Panther is armed with a chrome plated CN08 120 mm 55 caliber smoothbore gun developed by the ADD and WIA (now Hyundai WIA), and is capable of hitting a 30 centimeters (12 in) size object at range greater than 1 kilometer (0.62 mi). This is complemented by a home-grown bustle-type autoloader, similar to the Leclerc, which allows the tank to fire up to 10 rounds per minute. The laser barcode identifier of the autoloader recognizes the classification of pre-barcoded ammunition and selects a type of munition for loading based on mission need. The ammunition is loaded in a 16-shell magazine for ready-to-use, and 24 rounds at frontal hull, carrying a total of 40 rounds for its main armament.

The K2's primary anti-tank munitions, developed by the ADD and Poongsan Corporation, are the K279 APFSDS-T, designed with self-sharpening technology for armored targets, and the K280 HEAT-MP-T, a multipurpose chemical energy round with a proximity fuse that explodes within 7 meters from the target, for all types of targets including low-flying helicopters.

Secondary weapons include a 12.7 mm K6 Heavy Machine Gun and a 7.62 mm M60E2-1 coaxial machine gun. The trigger pull of the coaxial machine gun lightened from 4 kilograms (8.8 lb) to 3 kilograms (6.6 lb) for convenience.

==== Korean Smart Top-Attack Munition (KSTAM) ====
The Korean Smart Top-Attack Munition (KSTAM) was a research project to develop a fire-and-forget, top-attack anti-tank munition with an effective operating range of 2–8 kilometers (1.2–5.0 mi). It was developed specifically for use with the K2. Two different concepts were investigated: The KSTAM-I concept developed jointly by Hanwha and Israeli Military Industries and the KSTAM-II concept developed by Doosan in cooperation with Diehl Defence of Germany.

The KSTAM-I projectile had a tandem shaped charge warhead, folding canards and a small rocket motor. The projectile would detect the target using its own seeker and then hit the roof in a pitch-down trajectory similar to that of other top-attack anti-tank guided missiles (ATGMs).

Meanwhile, the KSTAM-II's projectile housed a scaled-down version of Diehl's SMArt 155 sub-munition. Upon reaching its designated target area, the projectile would eject the sub-munition. A parachute would then deploy, giving the sub-munitions on-board millimeter band radar, infrared and radiometer sensors time to seek and acquire stationary or moving targets.

Once a target has been acquired, the explosively formed penetrator (EFP) warhead is fired from a top-down position, to exploit the weaker top armor of tanks. Target acquisition can also be directed manually by the tank crew via a remote link. These characteristics allow the launch vehicle to remain concealed behind cover while firing successive rounds towards the known location of an enemy, or provide indirect fire support against targets hidden behind obstacles and structures.

The Korean Smart Top-Attack Munition (KSTAM) remained a research topic and neither the KSTAM-I nor the KSTAM-II reached series readiness.

=== Fire-control system and optics ===
The fire-control system (FCS) consists gunner's primary sight (GPS), commander's panoramic sight (CPS), ballistic calculator, electrical gun and turret drive system (EGTDS), and dynamic muzzle reference system (DMRS).

The K2 is equipped with an advanced fire-control system linked to an Extremely High Frequency (EHF) L-band Pulsed Doppler Radar system deployed on the frontal arc of the turret, along with a VAS-1K raman laser rangefinder and crosswind sensor. The system is capable of a "lock-on" mode, which can acquire and track specific targets up to a range of 9.8 kilometers (6.1 mi) using a thermographic camera. This allows the crew to fire accurately while moving as well as engage low-flying aircraft.

The fire-control system is also linked to an advanced gun stabilizer and trigger-delay mechanism to optimize accuracy while moving in uneven terrain. If the trigger on the main gun is pulled at the same time the tank encounters an irregularity in the terrain, oscillation of the gun barrel will cause temporary misalignment between a mirror-type laser reflector at the top of the barrel and a laser emitter (vertical sensor unit) at the base. This will delay the fire-control system from activating until the beam is re-aligned, improving the chances of hitting the intended target.

The Korean Commander's Panoramic Sight (KCPS) and the Korean Gunner's Primary Sight (KGPS) are present in the Black Panther as in the original series of K1A1 tanks, albeit redesigned to utilize the more advanced sensors and armaments deployed on the K2. The K2's Korean Gunner's Primary Sight adopts a thermographic camera that is more advanced than K1A1, and the sight provides 4x and 15x magnifications using the optical system, and 30x and 60x magnifications using a digital image processor.

The tank gun and turret are powered by an EGTDS developed by Hyundai Rotem and Doosan Mottrol (now Mottrol). The EGTDS provides high efficiency and high precision drive control, and its performance is improved by 3-axis stabilization. It is also designed to minimize vibration and noise when the turret is driven. The turret achieved a rotating speed of 800 mil (45 degrees) per second at the prototype stage.

The commander of the tank has the ability to override the gunner's command, to take control of the turret and gun. Moreover, unconfirmed reports state that, in the event of an emergency, the vehicle can be operated by only two crew members, or even a single one. It is speculated that the fire-control system can automatically spot and track visible targets, compare them using the data link established with other friendly vehicles to prevent redundant target engagements, and fire its main gun without manual input.

==== Automatic Target Detection and Tracking System ====
K2 has an Automatic Target Detection and Tracking System controlled by the Automatic Target Recognition algorithm. When the target is identified as a foe by the IFF/SIF (Identification Friend or Foe/Selective Identification Feature) system, the tank automatically aims and performs laser distance measurements on the target even if the tank is maneuvering on irregular terrain while the target is moving. It can lead the target and fire automatically based on ballistic data calculated by the turret mounted laser rangefinder and crosswind sensor. This feature enhances the performance of inexperienced gunners significantly.

=== Network-centric warfare capabilities and operability ===
==== Tactical information communication ====
A cold weather combat training of the tank unit of the 11th Maneuver Division of the ROK Army

The K2 houses the following features which help to improve situational awareness for the crew:

- C4I (Command, Control, Communications, Computers, and Intelligence) uplink.
- GPS/INS (Global Positioning Satellite/Inertial Navigation System) integrated navigation system.
- IFF/SIF (Identification Friend or Foe/Selective Identification Feature) system compliant with STANAG 4579. Located on the main gun mantlet, just above the gun, the system fires a 36 GHz beam in the direction of the gun for a response from the targeted vehicle. If a proper response signal is shown by the target, the fire control system automatically identifies it as a friendly. If the target fails to respond to the identification signal, it is then declared as a hostile.
- C4I linked BMS (Battlefield Management System) allows the vehicle to share its data with friendly units, including other armored vehicles and helicopters.

==== Operability and maintenance ====
The following features are provided for crew operability and system maintenance:

- Network-based tank combat training system utilizing 3D virtual reality technology. The embedded training computer designed for the K2 allows driving, gunnery, single tank combat, platoon level combat and command and platoon leaders combat training, and allows real-time information sharing and training with friendly tanks through a network system.
- Built-in test (BIT) feature to verify the integrity of the tank system. The BIT system provides the convenience of checking the tank for defects in its main functions without any external test equipment.

Work is also under way to integrate the experimental autonomous vehicle, unmanned wheeled reconnaissance drone into the Black Panther's systems, giving the tank's crew the ability to scout without disclosing its location.

=== Defensive capabilities ===
==== Passive protection systems ====
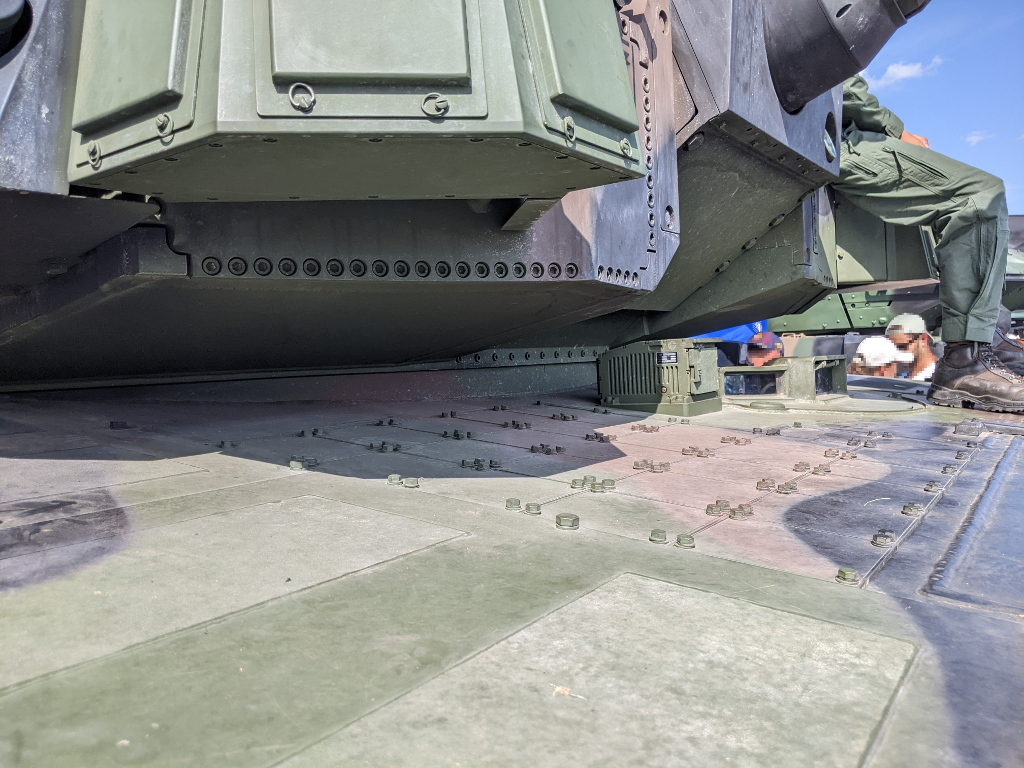
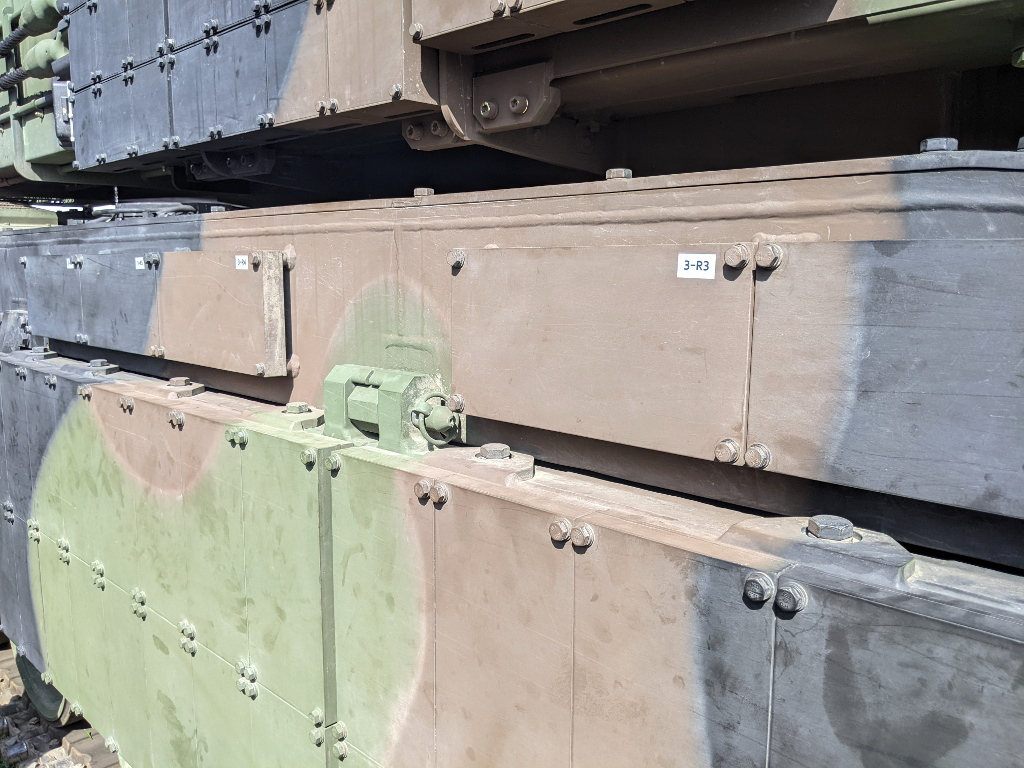
Reactive armor on the upper and sides

Despite South Korea producing K1 tanks, a dispatched team from the GDLS installed Special Armor Package (SAP) to prevent Koreans from physically accessing the Special Armor Package, which was identical to that of the M1 Abrams, in order to protect the United States' intellectual property rights and national security. Armor for main battle tanks was commonly regarded as top secret and its technology was unlikely to be exported. Therefore, developing domestic armor was the only option in order to design a tank. The ADD and Samyang Comtech developed Korean Special Armor Package (KSAP) for the K1A1 project, and South Korea also keeps most information in military secret level 2. In 1996, South Korea received 1,250 hp variant Russian domestic specification T-80Us along with Kontakt-5 explosive reactive armor (ERA), and studied its composite armor and ERA technology, which contributed to development of domestic armors.

The K2 uses a modular armor system in order to replace the inner material much quicker when it is damaged or whenever an enhanced version is available. Its armor was redesigned based on K1A1's KSAP, and is made of POSCO MIL-12560H armor steel, Samyang Comtech silicon carbide (SiC) ceramic plates, and aluminum (Al). The frontal armor has been claimed to be effective against the 120 mm APFSDS round fired from the L55 gun. ERA blocks are also present, with the formerly planned addition of ultra-high hardness and high-hardness armor package and non-explosive reactive armor (NERA) for the K2 Product Improvement Program (PIP) and export variant specification.

According to information provided to the National Defense Committee’s Audit of Government Operations in 2024, the K2's armor is expected to provide protection against the North Korean Bulsae-4 missile (a variant of the 9M111) with an estimated 600 to 800 mm penetration at front, but not at the sides. The more powerful Bulsae-5 missile (a North Korean variant of the 9M133 Kornet) with an estimated 1,000 to 1,200 mm penetration is expected to penetrate even the K2's frontal armor. This matches informations provided by Rep. Han Gi-ho of the People Power Party in 2021, who claimed that according to internal data of the South Korean military, the frontal armor of the K1 and K2 tanks can be defeated by the Bulsae-5 missile.

As per the National Defence Committee, the frontal armor of the K2 provides protection equivalent to 900 mm RHA against shaped charge warheads, whereas the side armor with ERA provides protection equivalent to 330 mm RHA. Subsequently, in 2024 the South Korean Ministry of National Defense requested the budget to incorporate a hard-kill active protection system into the tank.

Inside the hull, an overpressure system is installed to protect the tank crew from chemical and biological weapons, an automatic fire suppression system is programmed to detect and put out any internal fires that may occur, and atmospheric sensors alert the crew if the tank enters a hazardous environment. The K2's collective protection system, which integrates positive pressure and A/C devices, has a ventilation capacity of 180 m^{3}/h and an air conditioning capacity of 7,500 kcal/h. In addition, the interior of the tank is equipped with a neutron shielding liner made of a polyethylene-boron moderator to protect the tank crew from neutron radiation caused by nuclear explosions.

==== Active protection systems ====
K2 tanks deploy K415 smoke grenades and fire during maneuver drills.

The tank is equipped with Radar Warning Receiver (RWR) and Laser Warning Receiver (LWR), which detect homing radar or homing laser aimed at the tank and instantaneously turn the turret in the direction of threats as well as notifying friendly units via network system. The tank also has a total of 12 (6 on each side of the turret) Samyang Chemical K415 Visible/IR Screening Smoke Grenade. The K415 blocks visible and infrared view of the K2 from the enemy.

The K2 has a Multispectral Screening Smoke Grenade (MSSG) soft-kill active protection system. (Note: In Korea, this soft-kill active protection system is commonly called multi-region screening smoke grenade (다영역차장 연막유탄).) If an anti-tank guided missile (ATGM) is fired at the K2, the tank immediately warns crews and triangulate the projectile for activating SNT Dynamics SLS (Soft-kill Launcher System) that releases K419 multispectral screening smoke grenade, manufactured by Samyang Chemical, in the direction of the incoming missile at the most effective time. The multispectral screening smoke grenades hide tank from visible, forward-looking infrared, and millimeter wave optics and radar thus disrupt accuracy of missile.

The SLS is located at the rear center of the turret top, and is assisted by two Missile Warning Receiver (MWR) on the frontal turret using L-band pulsed doppler radar. Each system covers 90 degrees (total 180 degrees) and 60 degrees at a high angle, and is capable of detecting wire-guided missiles, which does not emit its own radar. The MWR will also be responsible for tracking and targeting incoming missiles for the hard-kill active protection system in future upgrades.

=== Mobility and maneuverability ===
The K2 can travel at speeds of up to 70 km/h (43 mph) on road surfaces, accelerate from 0 to 32 km/h (0 to 20 mph) within 7.47 seconds (MT883 Ka-501 engine) or 8.77 seconds (DV27K engine), and maintain speeds of up to 50 km/h (31 mph) in off-road conditions. It can also climb 60% slopes (31 degrees) and vertical obstacles 1.3 meters in height. Due to the relatively compact design of the engine, the designers were able to fit an additional compact Auxiliary Power Unit (APU) into the remaining compartment space. This is capable of producing 8~10 kW, and intended to act as an auxiliary power unit with which the tank may power its on-board systems when its main engine is turned off. It will also allow the tank to conserve fuel when idling and minimize the vehicle's thermal and acoustic signatures.

==== In-arm Suspension Unit (ISU) ====
K2 demonstrating posture control function

The Black Panther fields an advanced semi-active suspension system, called the in-arm suspension unit (ISU), which allows for individual control of every bogie on the tracks. This posture control function can tilt the chassis or lower the overall height by 40 centimeters (16 in). This allows the K2 to "sit", "stand" and "kneel", as well as "lean" towards one side or a corner. "Sitting" gives the tank a lower profile and offers superior handling over roads. "Standing" gives the vehicle higher ground clearance for maneuverability over rough terrain. "Kneeling" augments the angular range in which the tank's gun barrel can elevate and depress, allowing the vehicle to fire its main gun downhill as well as engage low-flying aircraft more effectively. The height adjustable suspension system detects rough road surface conditions in real time through the movement of the first road wheel in front and collects data, and the five road wheels in the rear automatically control the hydraulic pressure of the in-arm suspension unit and variable damper based on this terrain data to maintain optimal driving performance.

The unique suspension system of the Black Panther expands the gun's elevation angles, allowing it to target from a high hill or a low valley. This makes it particularly effective in mountainous areas with steep hills or even in urban cities with tall buildings. K2 can elevate its main gun up to 24 degrees, which allows a curved trajectory attack at a hovering helicopter target 5 kilometers (3.1 mi) away. The suspension system also cushions the chassis from vibrations when traveling over uneven terrain, as the bogies can be individually adjusted on the fly. This contributes to the comfort and overall condition of the operators engaged in fierce battles. The compact in-arm suspension unit with the integration of gas springs and dampers is mounted independently on the side of the chassis to provide additional interior space.

The K2 also has advanced track system called Dynamic Track Tension System (DTTS). Maintaining optimum tension through all maneuvers, it dramatically reduces the chance of throwing a track even in the most extreme situations. The DTTS is also designed to maintain optimal track tension while K2 is maneuvering to minimize the excessive load on the track and prevent the track from peeling off the road wheels.

==== Snorkel System ====
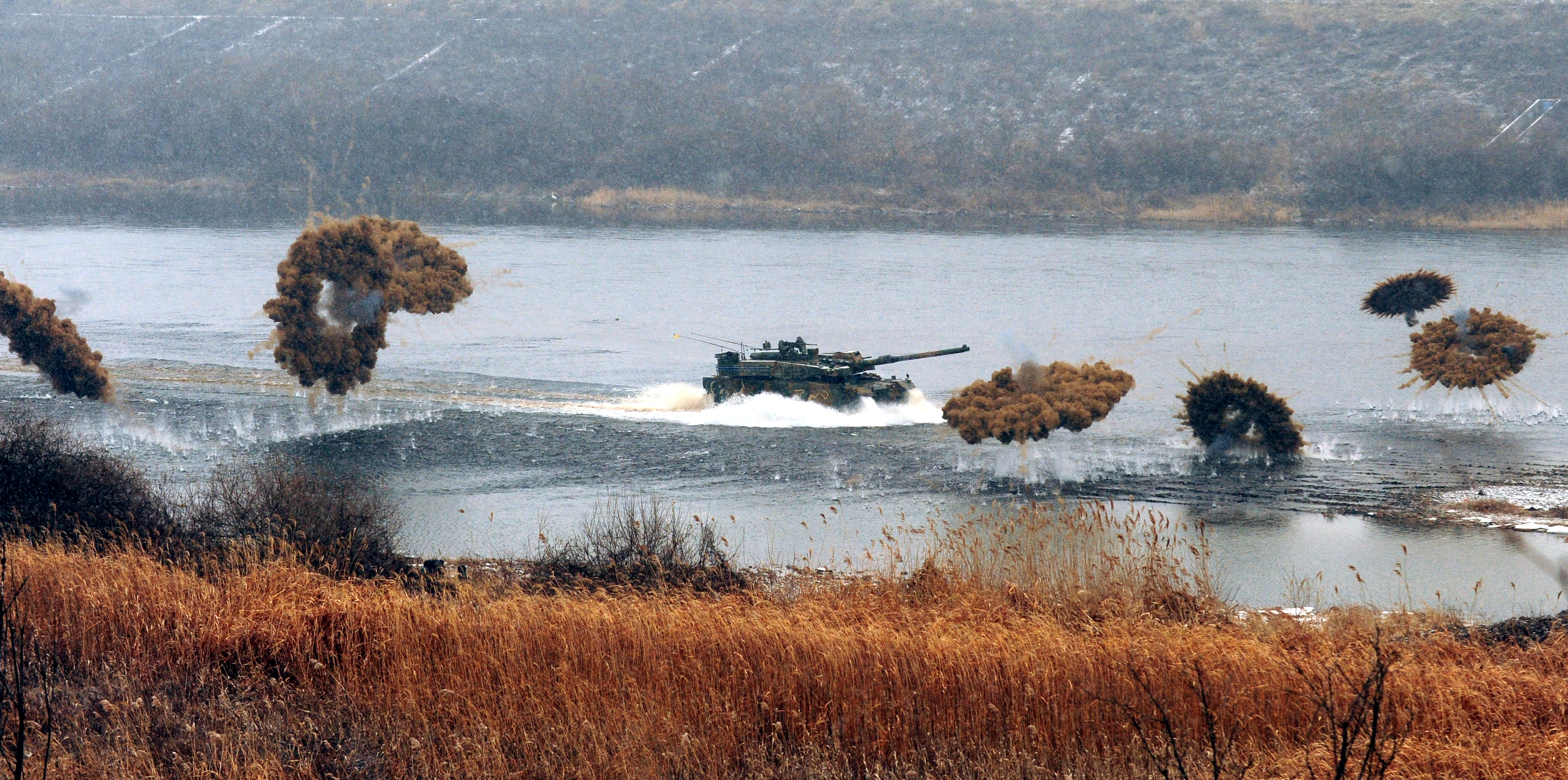
K2 tank fording a shallow river

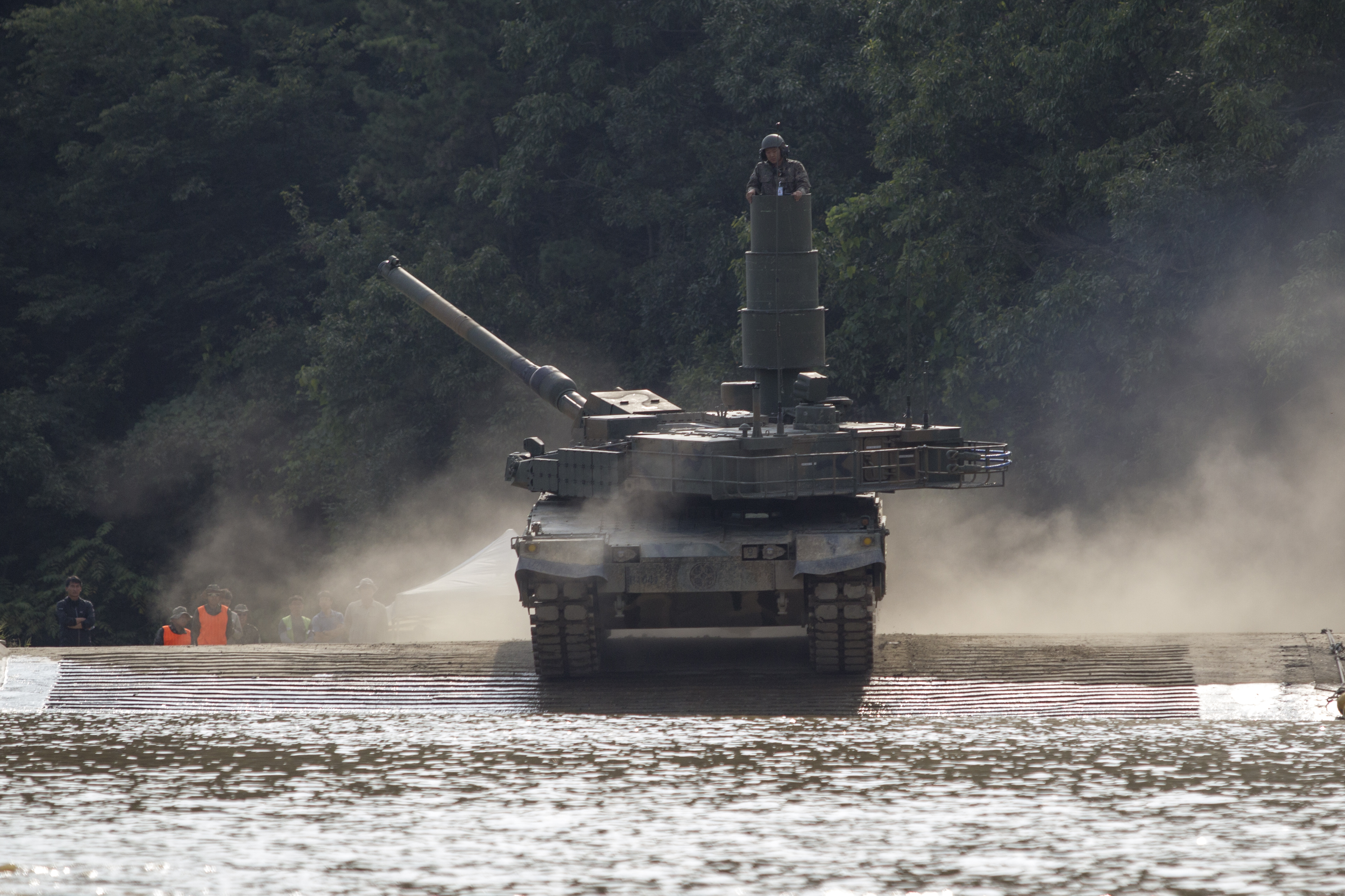
K2 tank with snorkel

The K2 Black Panther is a unique tank equipped with advanced snorkel capabilities, enabling it to navigate challenging battlefields with numerous rivers. It is fully protected from biochemical attacks by a sealed and air circulation system. This allows the tank to independently cross rivers and reach the battlefield faster than others that require engineers to build bridges or boats for river crossings. The vehicle can cross rivers as deep as 4.1 meters using a snorkel system, which also serves as a conning tower for the tank commander. The system takes approximately 20–30 minutes to prepare. The turret becomes watertight while fording, but the chassis can take in 1,900 liters (500 U.S. gal) of water to prevent excessive buoyancy from air inside the vehicle and keep the tracks planted firmly on the ground. Furthermore, the tank can enter combat-ready status as soon as it resurfaces. It is said that K2's predecessor, K1, can cross a river of 2 meter depth after 2 hours of preparation, which also requires assistance from military engineers. However, a K2 tank does not require outside assistance for river crossing. This type of self water-crossing ability is beneficial from a tactical perspective, as it allows for more attacking routes.

==== Engines and powertrains ====
In March 2011, South Korean Defense Acquisition Program Administration (DAPA) announced that mass production of the K2, which the Army was expecting to deploy in 2012, would not happen due to problems concerning its engine and transmission. In the evaluation test conducted in March 2012, it was reported that the domestic powerpack did not meet the required operational capability (ROC) proposed by the Ministry of National Defense in three categories: cooling fan speed control, maximum power at low temperature, and acceleration performance.

In April 2012, DAPA announced that due to ongoing issues with the reliability and durability of the domestically produced powerpack, the first 100 production K2s would use German-made Euro Powerpack and that service entry would be delayed until March 2014. The first 15 K2 Black Panther tanks were put into service in June 2014. Faulty domestic engines and transmissions previously halted production, but the lowering of required acceleration performance allowed it to enter service. Until domestic Doosan Infracore (now HD Hyundai Infracore) 1,500 hp engines were produced, the first mass production was employed with a German-made MTU powerpack, which was able to produce 100 vehicles by 2015.

Hyundai Rotem signed a contract from the second batch of 106 K2 tanks in December 2014, but the vehicles continued to have powerpack issues due to the domestic SNT Dynamics transmission failing durability tests. After SNT Dynamics complained about the domestic powerpack test standards, the 107th Defense Acquisition Program Promotion Committee held on November 29, 2017, gave it an opportunity to retest the durability of the transmission, but SNT Dynamics refused to retest the durability of the transmission. In February 2018, DAPA announced the second batch would have a "hybrid" powerpack consisting of the locally developed engine with the German RENK transmission system, allowing them to start entering service in 2019. An additional contract for the production of a third batch of about 110 K2s is to follow within the next several years.

On 25 November 2020, the 131st Defense Acquisition Program Promotion Committee decided to produce tanks in a powerpack that combines domestic engines and German transmissions in the third batch because SNT Dynamics refused to retest the durability of the domestic transmission.

On 6 December 2021, a senior SNT Dynamics official said it solved a technical problem with the transmission defect, and only the Ministry of National Defense's durability test remains in the first half of next year, and the fourth production of the K2 tank will include domestic transmission.

== K2 product improvement program (K2 PIP) ==
The K2 PIP is an improved version of the initial production model of the K2. Improvements will include:

- Upgraded modular armor package made of ultra-high hardness and high-hardness armor steel combining nanotechnology, developed for the K2 export variant.
- Upgrading the semi-active in-arm suspension unit to an active in-arm suspension unit.
- Integration of a high-resolution terrain-scanning system to the vehicle's suspension system. This is purported to allow the vehicle to "plan ahead" by scanning nearby terrain up to 50 meters away in all directions and calculate the optimal position of the bogies in order to improve vehicle handling over uneven terrain.
- Integration of a hard-kill active protection system.
- Addition of non-explosive reactive armor.
- Potentially replacing the 120 mm / L55 gun with an electrothermal-chemical gun, which will significantly increase the vehicle's firepower and potential payload. Later, the plan was scrapped because ADD succeeded in developing a new desensitized propellant for 120 mm munition.

=== Korean Active Protection System (KAPS) ===
The Korean Active Protection System (KAPS) is an indigenously developed hard-kill active protection system designed to protect the K2 from anti-tank threats. It uses a three-dimensional detection and tracking radar and a thermal imager to detect incoming threats. Warheads can be detected out to 150 meters from the tank, and a defensive rocket is fired to destroy them at 10–15 meters away.

The system can neutralize rocket-propelled grenades and anti-tank guided missiles. It may be installed on other platforms in the future like warships, helicopters, and buildings. Unit price per system is ₩670 million ($600,000). Implementation of the KAPS was cancelled in 2014 due to budgetary issues along with the price of a K2 being at 8 billion won, with addition of the KAPS it would increase procurement costs by 1 billion won per unit.

== Production ==
Mass production
Batch	Year	Engine	Transmission	Total	Notes
I	2014–2015	STX Engine/MTU Friedrichshafen; MT883 Ka-501; 4-short stroke 12-cylinder water-cooled diesel dry weight: 2,064 kg	RENK HSWL 295 TM; 5 forward 5 reverse gears dry weight: 2,450 kg	100	Domestic powerpack supply was rejected in the first batch plan due to defects and reliability issues. Later, the first batch adopted a modified MT883 Ka-501 engine produced under license by STX Engine through partnership with MTU.
II	2019–2020	HD Hyundai Infracore; DV27K; 4-long stroke 12-cylinder water-cooled diesel dry weight: 2,550 kg	RENK HSWL 295 TM	106	After SNT Dynamics, the manufacturer of the domestic transmission, refused to retest the transmission's durability, DAPA decided to combine the domestic engine with the German transmission to produce the tank.
III	2022–2023	HD Hyundai Infracore DV27K	SNT Dynamics EST15K; 6 forward 3 reverse gears dry weight: 2,500 kg (later changed to RENK HSWL 295 TM)	54	Because SNT Dynamics did not participate in the durability test, the decision was made to keep the German-built one for the third batch. It also includes an improved battlefield management system with the Korea Variable Message Format (KVMF), and the Korean Commander's Panoramic Sight (KCPS) and Korean Gunner's Primary Sight (KGPS) with improved resolution and daytime automatic target tracking function. At the request of the Polish government, 10 of the 54 K2s were deployed to the 20th Mechanized Brigade of the Polish Land Forces after being delivered to Poland on 5 December 2022.
IV	2024–2028	HD Hyundai Infracore DV27K	SNT Dynamics EST15K (conditional supply approval) (Note: The military says it will conditionally approve the supply of the domestic transmission if it passes 320 hours of endurance tests and 3,200 kilometers of driving tests organized by the government.)	183 (later changed to 150 units)	On July 27, 2022, Polish Armaments Group (PGZ) and Hyundai Rotem signed a framework agreement to supply 180 K2 tanks to the Polish Land Forces. Due to the signing of the agreement, a review of the production of 183 tanks scheduled for delivery to the South Korean Army has been delayed, and 180 K2 tanks will be delivered to the Polish Land Forces from 2022. On 25 May 2023, the 154th Defense Acquisition Program Promotion Committee deliberated and approved a plan to mass-produce 150 K2s with a budget of 1.94 trillion won for the fourth batch of the ROK Army.

== Exports ==
=== Turkey ===
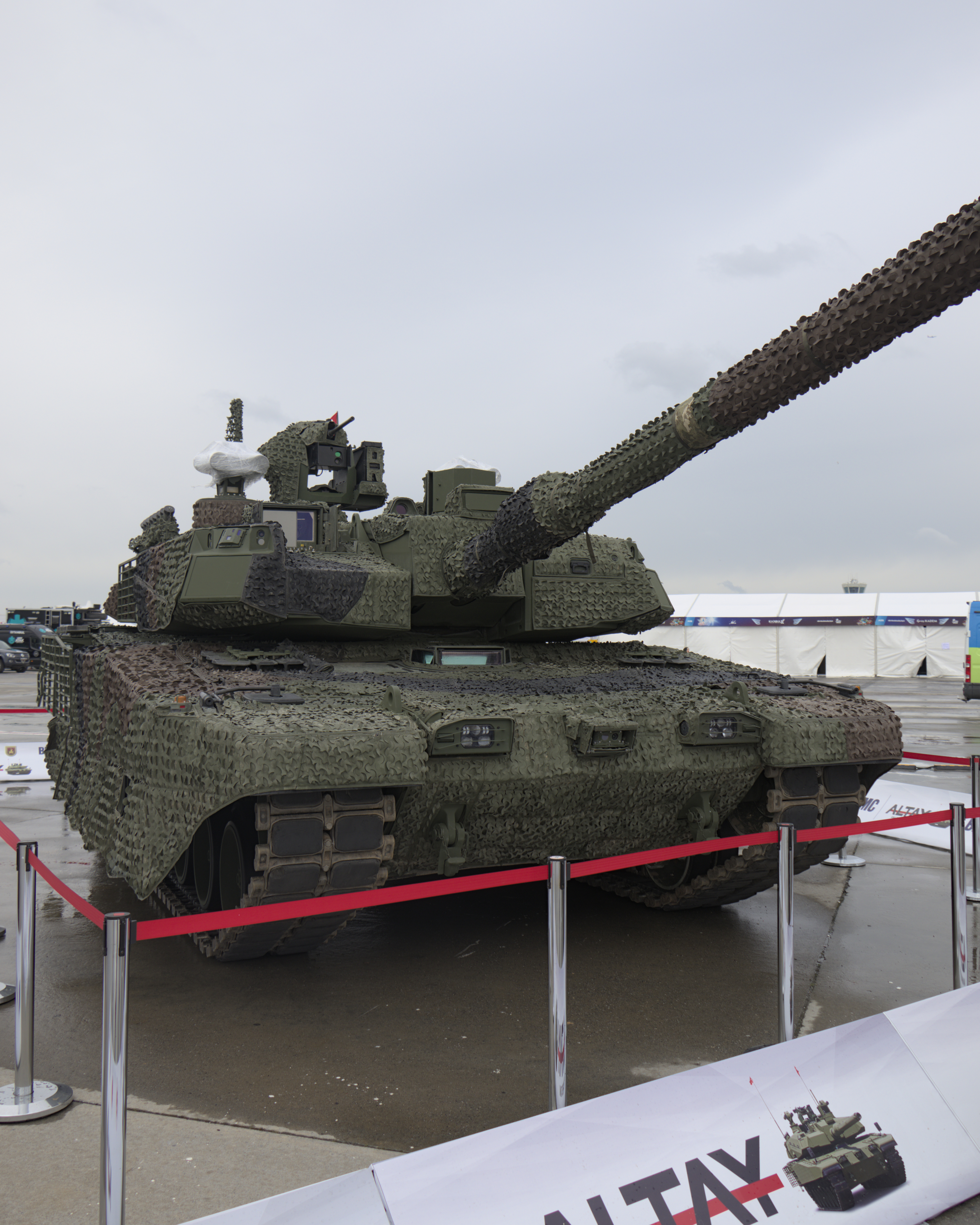
Altay T1

In June 2007, South Korea and Turkey negotiated an arms deal worth ₩500 billion (approximately $540 million), which included South Korea's support in the development of Turkey's Altay main battle tank and the export of 40 (+15) KT-1 trainer aircraft to Turkey.

On July 29, 2008, Hyundai Rotem and Turkey's Otokar signed a contract to provide design assistance and technology transfer for the Altay tank project. This collaboration included critical design elements, systems integration, and manufacturing expertise from South Korea, specifically tailored to develop Turkey's domestic manufacturing capabilities.

South Korean contributions to the Altay's development included the transfer of manufacturing technologies for critical components. Hyundai Rotem played a pivotal role in the system design and integration process, while Hyundai WIA provided the 120 mm 55-caliber smoothbore gun technology. Samyang Comtech shared expertise in advanced armor materials, and Poongsan Corporation supported the development of ballistic protection systems. These efforts laid the foundation for Turkey's indigenous capabilities in producing the Altay.

The cooperation extended beyond technical support, encompassing assistance in establishing production lines for key subsystems. Hyundai Rotem guided Otokar in tank systems development, while MKEK (Mechanical and Chemical Industry Corporation) received tank gun production technologies. Roketsan was supported in the design and manufacturing of advanced armor packages. These collaborative efforts were instrumental in the development of prototypes PV1 and PV2, finalized in 2015, and the Altay project's official completion in 2016.

On 10 March 2021, BMC, the main contractor responsible for the production of Altay tanks, decided to import engines and transmissions from South Korea to address production delays. Seven months later, on 22 October 2021, South Korea's DAPA approved the export of Hyundai Doosan Infracore (now HD Hyundai Infracore) DV27K engines and SNT Dynamics EST15K transmissions to Turkey. In August 2022, durability testing of the powerpack, combining the DV27K engine and EST15K transmission from South Korea, was successfully completed. Following this success, the first batch of Altay tanks will be produced using this Korean powerpack, which includes engines from HD Hyundai Infracore and transmissions by SNT Dynamics.

=== Poland ===
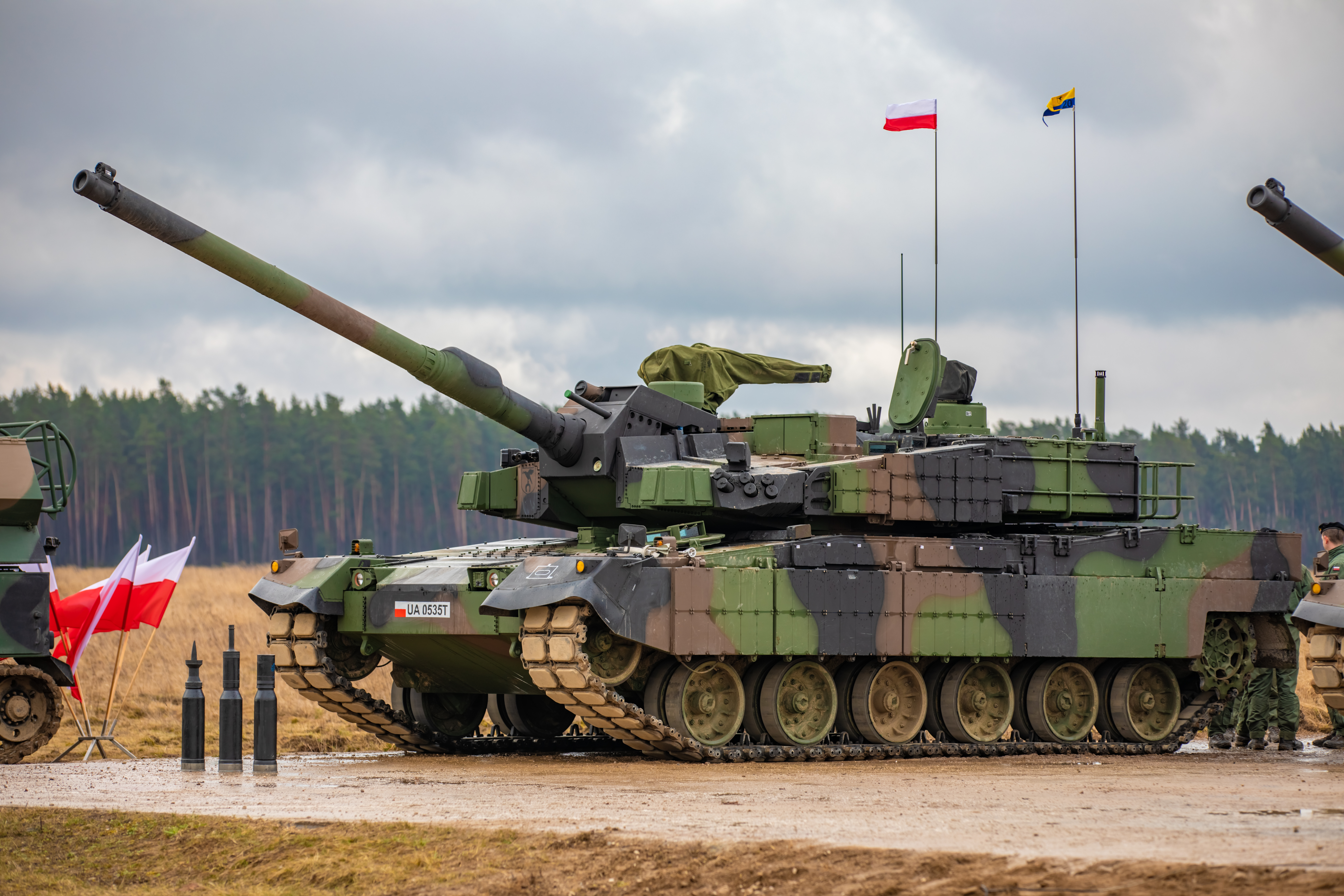
A Polish K2GF tank, 2023

In January 2020, Poland announced negotiations with Hyundai Rotem for license production of the K2 Black Panther for the Polish Army.

On 13 June 2022, the Polish Ministry of Defence announced that it had signed a memorandum of understanding (MoU) to purchase at least 180 K2 tanks for the Polish military. The 180 tanks will be produced by Hyundai Rotem in South Korea starting in 2022 and then supplied to the Polish Army.

On 27 July 2022, the Polish Armaments Group (PGZ) and Hyundai Rotem signed a framework agreement to supply 180 K2s and 820 K2PLs. The contract includes rapid arms supply and extensive technology transfer from South Korea. 180 K2s will be produced in South Korea and delivered to Poland starting in 2022 and 820 K2PLs will be produced in Poland under license starting in 2026.

On 26 August 2022, the first executive agreement worth $3.37 billion was signed to procure 180 K2s in Morąg, northern Poland. The contract includes training programs, logistics packages, explosive reactive armor packages, 50,000 120 mm, 4.3 million 7.62 mm and 12.7 mm machine gun ammunition for the K2. Soldiers of the 16th Mechanised Division of the Polish Army were sent to South Korea in October 2022 to participate in the training program. The 180 K2 tanks, which will be delivered from 2022 to 2025, will be sequentially deployed to the 20th Mechanised Brigade, 15th Mechanised Brigade and 9th Armoured Cavalry Brigade, which are brigade-class units belonging to the 16th Mechanised Division.

On 7 September 2022, PGZ and Hyundai Rotem signed a partnership agreement to develop and produce tanks, armored vehicles and ground unmanned systems. The contract includes joint cooperation in building manufacturing facilities in Poland for the production and maintenance of 1000 K2s and the production of K3 next-generation main battle tanks. In addition, the facility to be built in Poland will be used as a hub in Europe for the sale and maintenance of Hyundai Rotem's tanks and armored vehicles.

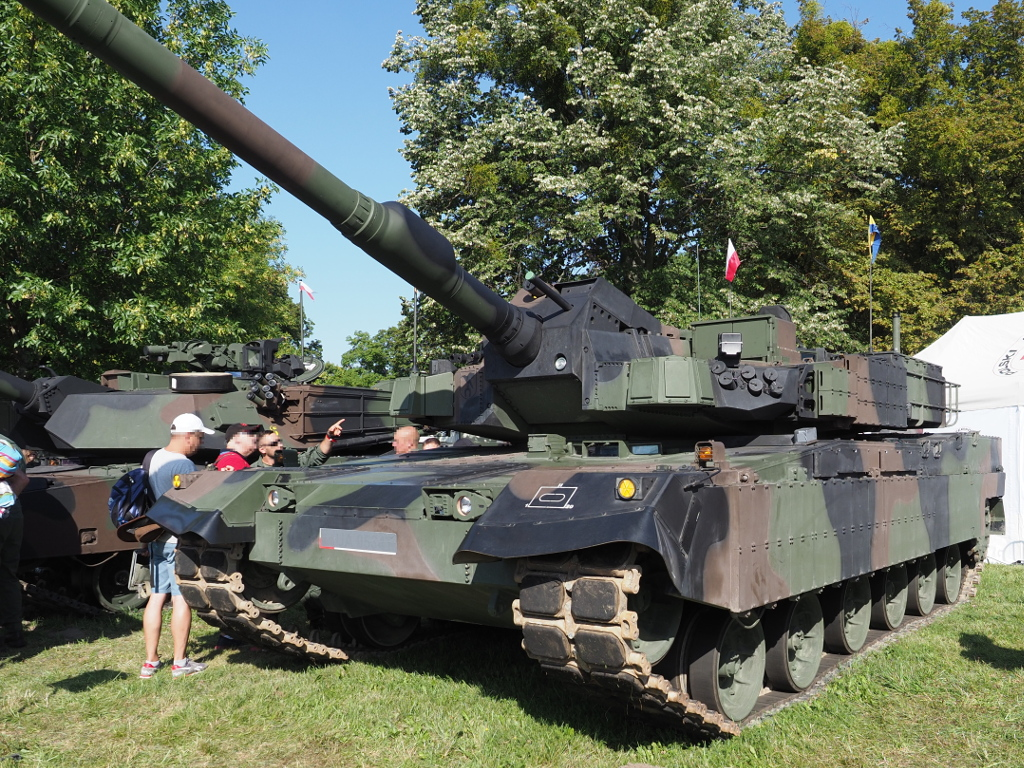
K2 at Radom, Poland (2023)

On 5 December 2022, the first 10 K2s arrived in Poland, just "six months" following the signing of the agreement. They were delivered to the 20th Mechanised Brigade of the 16th Mechanised Division on 9 December 2022.

On 31 March 2023, the Polish Ministry of Defense signed a foundational agreement with Hyundai Rotem for a consortium to produce K2PL in Poznań. The agreement included a supply of K2PL, which was redesigned to meet the Polish military's requirements, and a support vehicle based on the K2PL's platform.

=== Failed bids ===
==== Norway ====
The Norwegian Army considered the K2 (assigned as the K2NO) in a 2020 bid against the Leopard 2A7 and intended to make a decision in late 2022.

In February 2023, the Norwegian government announced its decision to acquire 54 Leopard 2A7 main battle tanks from Germany, despite the Norwegian Defence Materiel Agency (FMA) twice recommending the K2 Black Panther from South Korea. The FMA's recommendation was based on a comprehensive assessment that found both tanks to be highly capable and to meet all operational requirements. However, the K2 was found to be "significantly lower" in price, weighed approximately 10 tons less, and offered a more traditional and less risky delivery schedule. The K2 also reportedly demonstrated superior mobility on snow and ice during winter trials.

The government's final decision, however, was not based solely on technical and cost-efficiency. It was driven by broader strategic and security policy considerations. As explained by Prime Minister Jonas Gahr Støre, purchasing German tanks ensures Norway has the same equipment as its Nordic neighbors—Sweden, Finland, and Denmark—thereby enhancing interoperability and collective defense within NATO. The decision also served to strengthen Norway's already close security and industrial ties with Germany, a key NATO partner and a major consumer of Norwegian natural gas. While a disappointment for Hyundai Rotem, the strong performance of the K2 in the Norwegian trials and the FMA's clear recommendation for it validated the tank's standing as a top-tier contender, likely boosting its reputation for future export opportunities to other NATO countries.

Leopard 2A7 tanks will take some time to arrive in Norway – the first are scheduled to be delivered between 2026 and 2031.

== Prototypes and variants ==
=== Prototypes ===
- XK2 MTR (Mobility Test Rig): Experimental vehicle for mobility tests, with main gun and electronic equipment removed from the turret. Only one was produced.
- XK2 FTR (Firepower Test Rig): Experimental vehicle for fire control, combat control, and low temperature operation tests. Like MTR, only one was produced for the experiment.
- XK2 PV (Pilot Vehicle): Experimental vehicle for the technical demonstration test of three XK2s, these vehicles were also called Pilot Vehicles and numbered PV1 through PV3. The main test objectives of these vehicles were endurance tests, developer tests, operator tests, and integrated logistics support tests.
  - XK2: As the last prototype developed based on the XK2 PV released on 2 March 2007, the development was officially completed in September 2008 after the operational test of the Republic of Korea Army.

=== Variants ===
- K2: Mass production variant with explosive reactive armor added to the sides of the turret and chassis. Deployed to the Republic of Korea Army starting 1 July 2014.
  - K2 PIP (Product Improvement Program): The upgrade focuses on enhancing survivability and combat effectiveness by integrating a hard-kill active protection system (APS) to counter anti-tank missiles and drone threats, a 360-degree battlefield awareness system to improve crew situational awareness in urban and mountainous environments, and an AI-based Remote-Controlled Weapon Station (RCWS) for enhanced firepower. These improvements align with the evolving operational environment and the need for manned-unmanned collaborative combat capabilities.
- K2ME: Proposed licensed version of K2 for export to middle eastern countries. It has an upgraded armor package and 7 road wheels, but unlike the K2, it lacks a Laser Warning Receiver (LWR) on the front of the turret.
- K2NO: Proposed licensed version of K2 for the Norwegian Armed Forces as a replacement for their aging fleet of Leopard 2A4. It is armed with a Trophy hard-kill APS, composite add-on armor, a 12.7mm RCWS, and add-on explosive reactive armor. In addition, preheating devices, battery heating packs, and electric air blow systems have been added to prevent the engine from turning off in Norway's cryogenic environment. The first few tanks were to be shipped from South Korea while the rest were to be built locally. The K2NO was competing against the Leopard 2A7 in tank trials. On February 3, 2023, the K2NO was rejected in favor of the Leopard 2A7.
- K2EX: Export variant presented at ADEX 2023. It incorporates an active protection system, called KAPS-2, a variant of the Trophy active protection system, a battlefield situational awareness device that provides 360° vision and a RCWS that incorporates an anti-drone gun. A notable feature of this variant is the incorporation of a modification that allows the ammunition to operate with information injection. This innovation allows the crew to control both the timing and shape of munition explosions, improving the adaptability of combat strategies. The side armor of the turret and chassis was also improved.
- K2PL: Proposed licensed version of K2 for the Polish Armed Forces as a replacement for the aging fleet of PT-91 tanks currently in service. The K2PL retains most of the K2's features, such as the CN08 120 mm gun barrel, bustle type autoloader, pulse-doppler radar and In-arm suspension unit (ISU), 6 road wheels, but it differs from the original version, among others: hard-kill APS, anti-UAV electronic warfare system, composite add-on armor, a 12.7mm RCWS, and add-on explosive reactive armor, additional armor of the turret and hull by adding detachable panels of layered armor, and in the case of the drive compartment, a mesh and bar armor, designed to protect against HEAT projectiles. Initially, the Polish side wanted the new tank to have an ammunition compartment separated from the crew compartment, but the design of the turret is not compatible with such a far-reaching change. After it turned out that this would require redesigning the hull and adding a seventh road wheel, the idea was abandoned. Under the framework agreement between PGZ and Hyundai Rotem on the supply of K2 and K2PL, production of 820 K2PLs is scheduled to start in 2026 and will be divided between Poland and South Korea. In September 2025, Rafael Advanced Defense Systems and Hyundai Rotem announced an agreement to implement Trophy into the K2PL at MSPO 2025 Defense Exhibition.

=== Support vehicles ===
- K2 ARV: Armored recovery vehicle based on the chassis of the K2.
- K2PL ARV: Armoured recovery vehicle based on the chassis of the K2, developed in cooperation with FFG for the Polish Armed Forces, to debut in 2029.
- K2 CEV: Combat engineer vehicle based on the chassis of the K2.
- K2 ABL: Armoured bridge layer based on the chassis of the K2.

== Operators ==
A map of operators of the K2 Black Panther or its variants

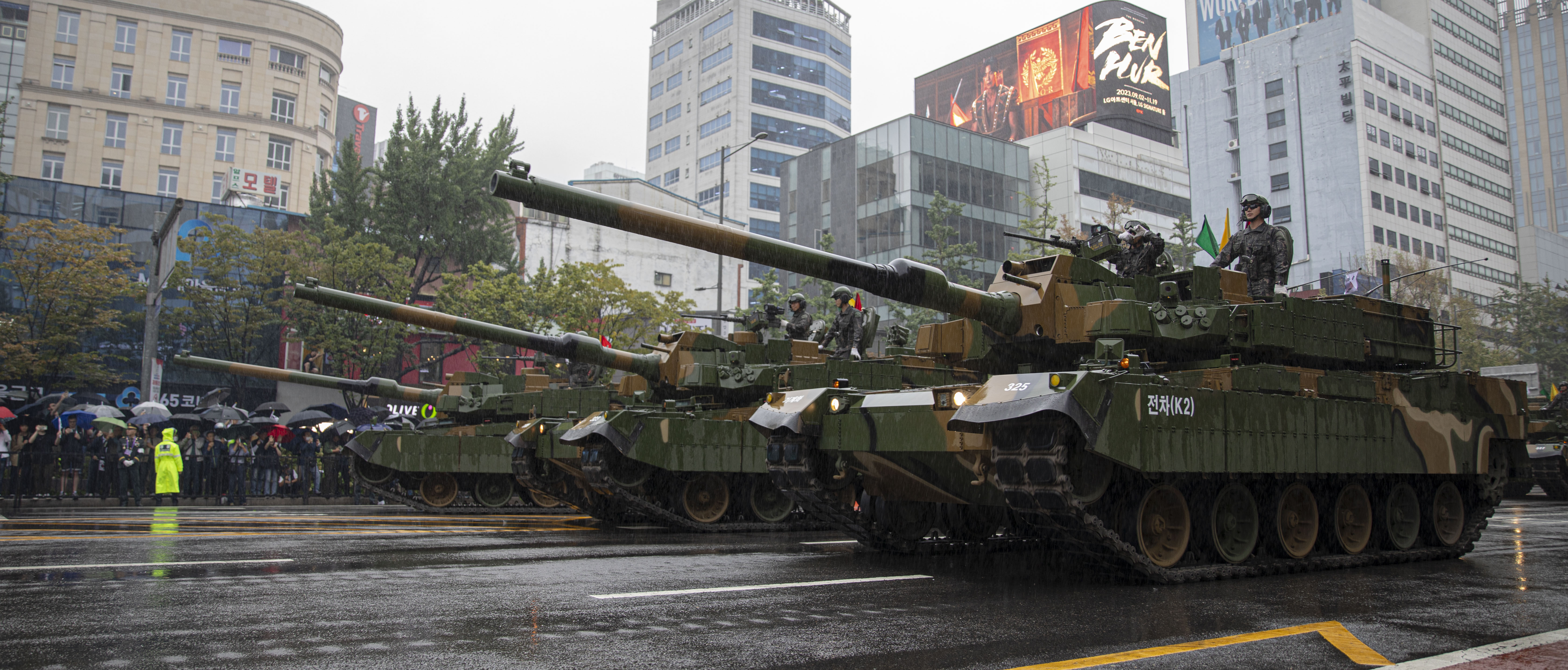
K2 Black Panther during the 75th Republic of Korea Armed Forces parade, in Seoul, South Korea, on September 26, 2023

=== Current operators ===
Poland
Polish Land Forces – On 26 August 2022, the executive agreement was signed to procure K2. A total of 180 K2s were delivered to Polish Land Forces from 2022 to November 2025.

Second firm order in August 2025 for 180 K2 (116 K2GF + 64 K2PL), worth USD $6.5 billion. The K2PL and support vehicles will be produced in Poland. By 2030, the Polish Army will have 296 K2GF tanks, 64 K2PL tanks, 31 K2PL ARV technical support vehicles, 25 K2PL AEV engineering vehicles, 25 K2PL AVLB self-propelled bridges.

The Polish Land Forces have in service 238 K2s as of November 2026.
- Armed Forces General Command
  - 16th Mechanised Division
    - 9th Armoured Cavalry Brigade
    - 15th Mechanised Brigade
    - 20th Mechanised Brigade
- Military University of Land Forces: 4 K2s

South Korea
Republic of Korea Army – Currently, 260 K2 tanks are in service. An additional 150 K2 PIPs are slated to be commissioned.
- Ground Operations Command
  - VII Maneuver Corps
    - 8th Maneuver Division
      - 60th Mechanized Infantry Brigade
      - 73rd Mechanized Infantry Brigade
    - 11th Maneuver Division
      - 9th Mechanized Infantry Brigade
      - 13th Mechanized Infantry Brigade
      - 61st Mechanized Infantry Brigade

=== Undisclosed operators ===
Saudi Arabia
According to 2024 trade statistics, South Korea exported $115.73 million worth of "tanks" and armored vehicles to Saudi Arabia, which the value is increased by 7 times compared to 2023. A DAPA official told the details are confidential at Saudi Arabia’s request. Saudi Arabia is reportedly only considering the K2 Black Panther among Korean tanks, and based on sales values, it's speculated that a single-digit number of prototype variants might be sold for testing before a larger purchase.

=== Potential operators ===
Armenia
In October 2024, it was announced that Armenia might become an operator of the K2 Black Panther.
Brazil
In November 2026, was reported that Hyundai Rotem is preparing to offer the K2 Black Panther to the Brazilian Army, within the program to replace Leopard 1A5 MBTs.
Egypt
Egypt has revealed that it was seeking to procure the Black Panther as trade between the two nations has increased in recent years.
Iraq
Expressed interest in purchasing up to 250 K2s.
Morocco
Morocco has shown significant interest in acquiring the K2 Black Panther as part of its ongoing military modernization efforts. In April 2025, Moroccan Minister of Industry and Trade Ryad Mezzour visited Seoul, where he reportedly discussed Rabat's intention to purchase the K2, along with the M-SAM air defense system and KSS-III submarines. The K2 is seen as a suitable complement to Morocco's existing fleet of American-made M1A2 Abrams tanks. The potential acquisition of advanced South Korean military hardware highlights the deepening defense and economic ties between the two nations, with a previous deal for double-decker trains also being finalized between Morocco and Hyundai Rotem.
Romania
Romania is interested in purchasing additional tanks to replace its existing fleet of TR-85-800 and TR-85M1. The target mentioned in the local media is of 300 new tanks on top of the 54 M1A2 Abrams already ordered. According to Hyundai Rotem, the target is closer to 500 units.
The Romanian armed forces have approached Germany and South Korea and their defence industry for that programme. The K2 Black Panther tank underwent live-fire testing at the Smârdan training range in Romania in May 2024.

=== Failed bids ===
Norway
Norway put the K2 in competition against the Leopard 2A7V which was selected by the Norwegian Army in 2023, and later on the Leopard 2A8 was ordered.
Peru
On November 16, 2024, Hyundai Rotem announced that it signed a comprehensive agreement with the Peruvian Army's Ordnance Factory (FAME S.A.C.) in Lima, Peru, for the supply of around 100 K2 tanks and other ground weapons. Hyundai Rotem President Lee Yong-bae and Jorge Zapata, the representative of the Peruvian Ordnance Factory, signed the 'Ground Equipment Cooperation Framework Agreement' in the presence of the heads of state from both Korea and Peru. This agreement aims to determine the total volume and scale of the K2 tank supply project before moving on to individual execution contracts, which will outline delivery schedules, detailed specifications, training, and maintenance conditions. The K2 Black Panther has been a strong contender for the Peruvian Army's "New MBT Acquisition Program," aimed at replacing its aging fleet of Soviet-era T-54/55 tanks. The K2's advanced features, particularly its hydropneumatic suspension system which allows it to operate effectively in diverse terrain, were seen as a major selling point for Peru's rugged mountainous interior. In November 2024, Hyundai Rotem and the Peruvian state-owned military production enterprise FAME S.A.C. signed a "General Cooperation Agreement," laying the groundwork for a potential purchase of 100 K2 tanks and future technology transfers for local production. The K2 was subsequently displayed at the SITDEF 2025 Defense Exhibition in Lima, further showcasing the tank's capabilities to Peruvian military officials. In December 2025 ordered 54 tanks K2. In October 2026, the Peruvian defence minister, Rafael Belaúnde, stated that Peru does not have the funds to conclude the order of the tanks.
Slovakia
In 2021, Slovakia discussed a potential K2 buy at the ministerial level. In February 2025, Slovak and Polish Defence Ministers Robert Kalinak and Wladyslaw Kosiniak-Kamysz signed an agreement on the intention to strengthen cooperation in the arms industry. The Polish minister mentioned Slovakia's interest in Korean K2 tanks, which the Poles will produce in a modified version on their territory. Due to changes in the plan and the desire to reduce costs, the decision was made to purchase light tanks of Swedish or Turkish production instead of main battle tanks.

=== Summary ===
Operators	Orders	Acquisition			Losses	In service	Note
Operators	Orders	K2	K2 PIP	K2PL	Losses	In service	Note
(South Korea) Republic of Korea Army and Marine Corps	K2; 260 K2 PIP; 150	260 (-260)	(+150) (+260)	—	—	260 0	Batch I: 100 delivered, upgrade in progress. Batch II: 106 delivered, upgrade in progress. Batch III: 54 delivered, upgrade in progress. Batch IV: 150 K2 PIPs ordered.
(Poland) Polish Land Forces	K2GF; 296 K2PL; 64	238 (+58) (-296)	—	(+3) (+61) (+296)	—	238 0	Batch I: 180 K2GF delivered, upgrade to K2PL planned. Batch II: An order of 116 K2GF and 3 K2PL from South Korea, along with 61 K2PL to be produced in Poland. Upgrade to K2PL planned
In service	Total orders 770	498	0	0	—	498	
In service	Total orders 770	Total manufactured: 498 To be manufactured: 272			—	498	

Legend of the colored numbers in the table:

Systems assembled and produced in South Korea
Systems assembled or produced outside of South Korea
2nd hand sold/transferred [ − ] and bought/received [ + ]
System upgraded, one variant to the other [ − ] / [ + ]

== See also ==
- List of main battle tanks by country
- List of main battle tanks by generation
