= KK =

KK, K.K., kK, and other variants may refer to:

== Arts and media ==
=== Fictional characters and items ===
- K.K. Slider, a fictional character from the video game franchise Animal Crossing
- Karkat Vantas, a character from the webcomic Homestuck, frequently called "KK" by his friend Sollux
- Krusty Krab, a fictional restaurant in SpongeBob SquarePants

=== Music ===
- "KK" (song), 2014, by Wiz Khalifa
- Kk. or Kirkpatrick number, a designation system for Domenico Scarlatti's keyboard sonatas, devised by Ralph Kirkpatrick
- Kobylańska Katalog or KK, catalogue of the works of Frédéric Chopin, authored by Krystyna Kobylańska

=== Other media ===
- Kritika Kultura or KK, a Philippine journal of literary, language and cultural studies
- Kvinner og Klær (Women and Clothes) or KK, a Norwegian weekly magazine
- The Faceless Ones, a 1967 Doctor Who serial (production code KK)

== Language ==
- Kazakh language (ISO 639-1 code kk), a Turkic language
- Kenyon and Knott or KK Phonetic Transcription, a transcription system used in the 1944 Pronouncing Dictionary of American English
- Kernewek Kemmyn (Common Cornish), a variety of the Cornish language
- Kk (digraph), used to represent a consonant in various languages

== People ==
=== Actors ===
- KK Goswami (born 1973), Indian film and television actor
- Kay Kay Menon (born 1968), Indian actor

=== In music ===
- KK (singer), (Krishnakumar Kunnath, 1968–2022), Bollywood playback singer
- KK (musician) (born 1956), Icelandic musician
- KK (composer, producer) (born 1975), British record producer and musician
- K. K. Downing (born 1951), British musician
- KK, born Kelton L. McDonalda, rapper from the American rap group 2nd II None

=== In politics ===
- K. Keshava Rao (born 1939), Indian politician
- Kemal Kılıçdaroğlu (born 1948), Turkish politician
- Kenneth Kaunda (1924–2021), first president of Zambia

=== In sport ===
- Keke Rosberg (born 1948), Finnish racing driver
- Jesperi Kotkaniemi, Finnish ice hockey player
- Kwang-hyun Kim, Korean baseball player, plays for the St. Louis Cardinals

== Transportation ==
- Leav Aviation, a German airline (IATA code KK)
- AtlasGlobal, formerly Atlasjet, a defunct Turkish airline (IATA code KK)
- , the Keikyū Main Line connecting locations in Tokyo and Kanagawa, Japan
- KK, a former subway route replaced by the J/Z (New York City Subway service)

== Places ==
=== Malaysia ===
- Kota Kinabalu or KK, a city in Sabah
- Kuala Kangsar, royal town of Perak
- Kuala Kurau, a town in Kerian District, Perak Malaysia
- Kuala Klawang, a town in Jelebu District, Negeri Sembilan

=== Elsewhere ===
- Kinnickinnic River (Milwaukee River) or "KK River", which flows into Lake Michigan
- Northern Cyprus or by its Turkish name "Kuzey Kıbrıs"

== Science and technology ==
- KK-theory, in algebraic topology
- KK thesis, a principle of epistemology
- Kaluza–Klein theory, a theory in physics
- Kilokelvin (kK), a temperature or temperature difference of 1000 kelvins

== Other uses ==
- Kabushiki gaisha or kabushiki kaisha, a type of Japanese joint-stock company commonly abbreviated as "K.K." or ⟨㏍⟩
- Jeep Liberty (KK), a model of Jeep Liberty made from 2008 until 2012
- k.k. or k.-k. (kaiserlich-königlich), meaning "imperial-royal" in the Austrian and Austro-Hungarian Empires
- "kk", instant-messaging slang for "OK", an acceptance and indication that no further explanation is necessary
- KK Super Mart, a convenience store chain in Malaysia
- Karachi Kings, a cricket team franchise in Pakistan Super League

== See also ==
- 2K (disambiguation)
- K2 (disambiguation)
- K (disambiguation)
- KKK (disambiguation)
- KKKK (disambiguation)
- KKKKK (disambiguation)
- K&K (disambiguation)
- KK Mladost (disambiguation)
- KKAY, an FM radio station in White Castle, Louisiana
- Kay Kay and His Weathered Underground, a Seattle band
