= Major non-NATO ally =

Special designation of the United States

- United States NATO members, excluding the United States itself Major non-NATO allies Former major non-NATO ally (Afghanistan)
- Formation: 1987
- Founder: Sam Nunn
- Members: 22 states: Argentina; Australia; Bahrain; Brazil; Colombia; Egypt; Israel; Japan; Jordan; Kenya; Kuwait; Morocco; New Zealand; Pakistan; Peru; Philippines; Qatar; Saudi Arabia; South Korea; Taiwan (de facto); Thailand; Tunisia

A major non-NATO ally (MNNA) is a designation given by the United States government to countries that have strategic working relationships with the United States Armed Forces while not being members of the North Atlantic Treaty Organization (NATO).

While MNNA status does not automatically constitute a mutual defense pact with the United States—as would be the case through NATO membership—it does confer a variety of military and financial advantages that are otherwise unobtainable by non-NATO countries. The designation also denotes strong diplomatic and economic ties and is considered a symbol of mutual friendship.

There are currently 22 major non-NATO allies across four continents: 12 in Asia, 4 in Africa, 4 in South America, and 2 in Oceania.

== List of MNNAs ==
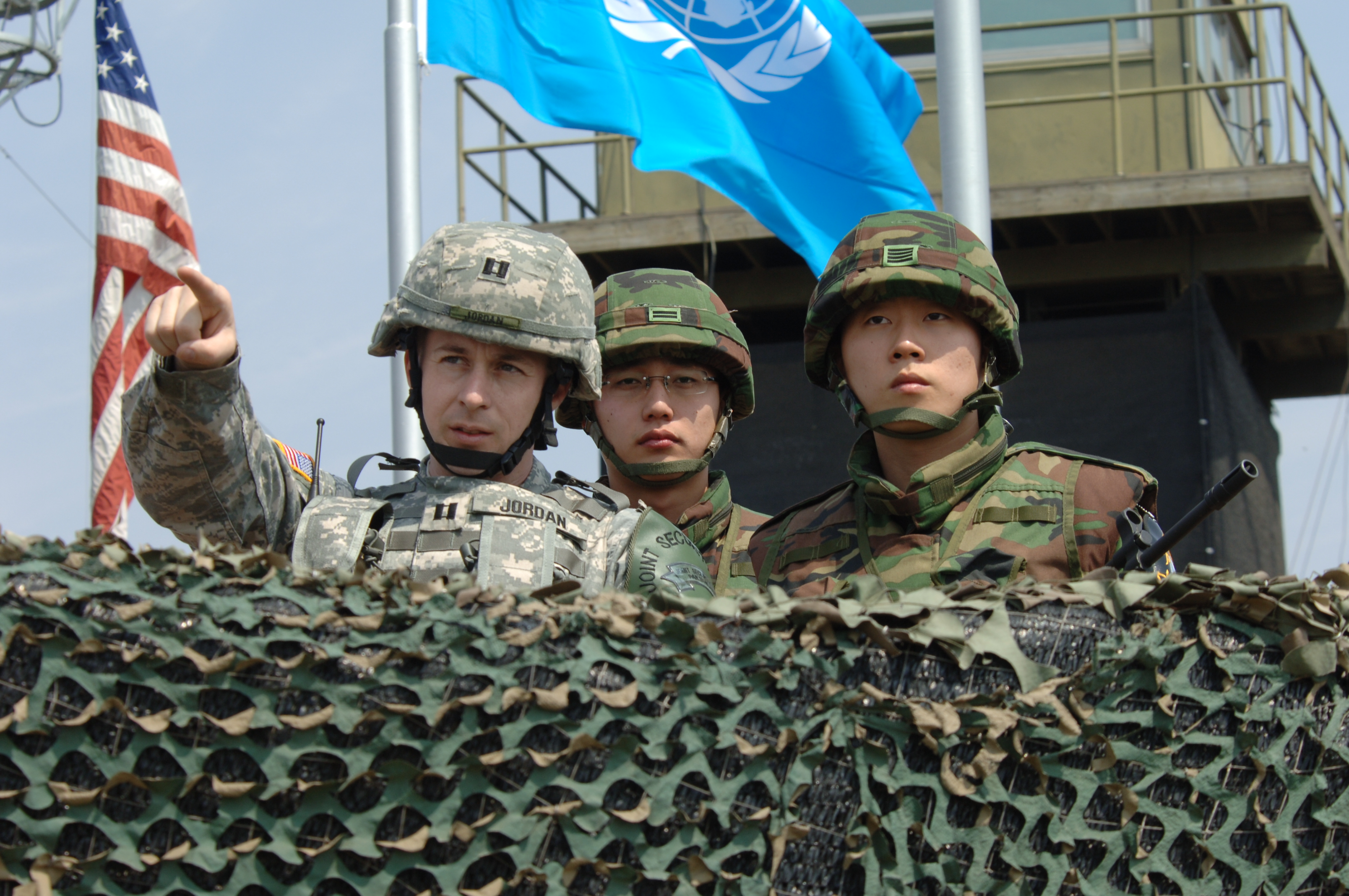
South Korean soldiers and a US Army officer monitor the Korean Demilitarized Zone in 2008.

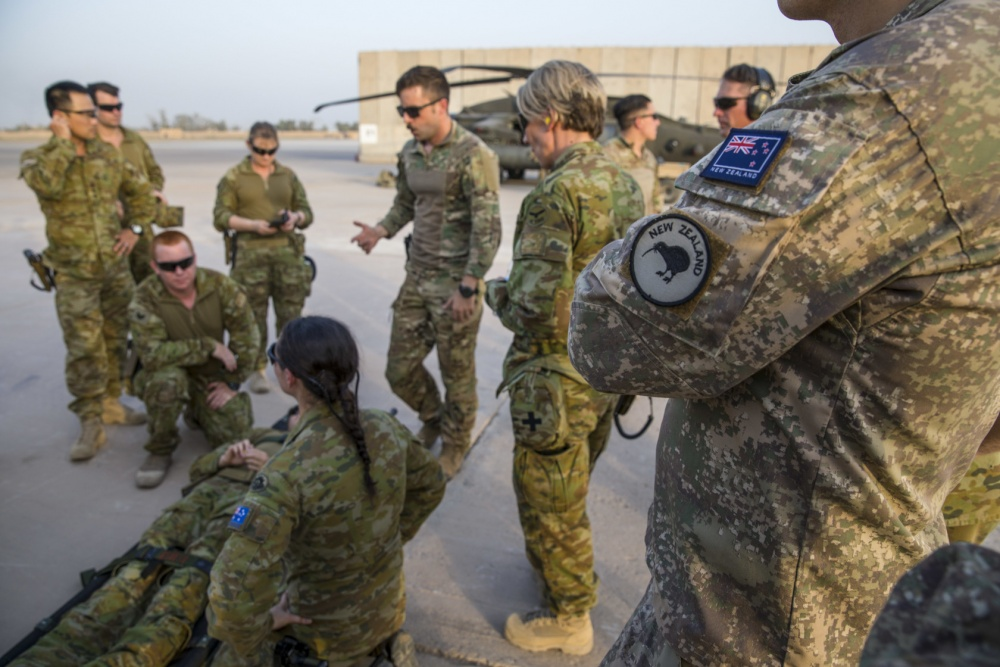
Australian Defence Force, New Zealand Defence Force, and US Army personnel conduct medevac training exercises at Camp Taji, Iraq, in 2018.

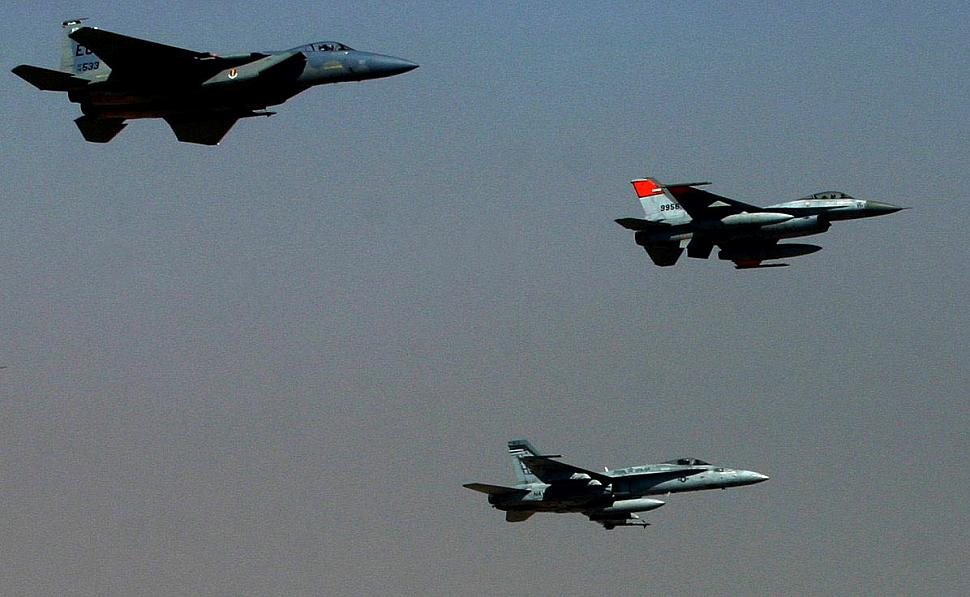
An Egyptian F-16C Block 40 with a USN F/A-18 Hornet and a USAF F-15 Eagle during Bright Star 05

=== Current MNNAs ===
The following countries are listed in chronological order of their designation as MNNAs by the United States government. In addition, an act provides that Taiwan shall be treated as a MNNA, without formal designation as such:

President	Country	Year	Note
Ronald Reagan	Australia	1987	
Ronald Reagan	Egypt	1987	
Ronald Reagan	Israel	1987	
Ronald Reagan	Japan	1987	
Ronald Reagan	South Korea	1987	
Bill Clinton	New Zealand	1996	
Bill Clinton	Jordan	1996	
Bill Clinton	Argentina	1998	
George W. Bush	Bahrain	2002	
George W. Bush	Philippines	2003	
George W. Bush	Taiwan (de facto)	2003	
George W. Bush	Thailand	2003	
George W. Bush	Kuwait	2004	
George W. Bush	Morocco	2004	
George W. Bush	Pakistan	2004	
Barack Obama	Tunisia	2015	
Donald Trump (first term)	Brazil	2019	
Joe Biden	Colombia	2022	
Joe Biden	Qatar	2022	
Joe Biden	Kenya	2024	
Donald Trump (second term)	Saudi Arabia	2026	
Donald Trump (second term)	Peru	2026	

=== Former MNNA ===
- Afghanistan (2012–2022): Designated by the Obama administration in 2012 during the rule of the Islamic Republic of Afghanistan, and effectively ceased to function as an MNNA after the American-allied Islamic Republic fell to the Taliban during the 2021 Taliban offensive. Afghanistan is currently governed by a generally unrecognized Islamic Emirate led by the Taliban. The Biden administration formally notified Congress of its revocation of Afghanistan's MNNA status in July 2022.

== History ==
MNNA status was first created in 1987, when Congress added section 2350a — otherwise known as the Sam Nunn Amendment — to Title 10 of the United States Code. It stipulated that cooperative research and development agreements could be enacted with non-NATO allies by the secretary of defense with the concurrence of the secretary of state. The initial MNNAs were Australia, Egypt, Israel, Japan, and South Korea.

In 1996, major non-NATO allies received additional military and financial benefits when section 2321k was added to Title 22 of the United States Code (also known as section 517 of the Foreign Assistance Act of 1961), which added MNNAs to many of the same exemptions from the Arms Export Control Act that were enjoyed by NATO members. It also authorized the President to designate a country as an MNNA thirty days after notifying Congress. When enacted, the statute designated the initial five countries as major non-NATO allies and added New Zealand to the list.

=== Israel ===
The House of Representatives passed the United States–Israel Strategic Partnership Act of 2014 in December of that year. This new category would have placed Israel one notch above the MNNA classification and would have added additional support for defense and energy infrastructure, in addition to strengthened cooperation through business and academics. The bill additionally called for the increasing of American war reserve stock in Israel to US$1.8 billion. The bill did not reach a vote, and thus did not pass or become law.

=== New Zealand ===
U.S.–New Zealand strategic and military cooperation suffered a setback after the breakdown of the ANZUS Treaty in 1984, triggered by disagreements over nuclear ship entry. The designation of New Zealand as an MNNA in 1996 reflected the warming of bilateral relations between the two countries. In June 2012, New Zealand signed a partnership arrangement with the North Atlantic Treaty Organization (NATO), further strengthening and consolidating relations with the United States.

=== Argentina ===
In 1998, President Bill Clinton named Argentina as an MNNA for the "Argentine compromise and contribution to international peace and security" that was materialized in its participation in the Gulf War (Argentina was the only South American country to join the coalition's fight against Iraq), and for its continuing support for United Nations peacekeeping missions.

=== Taiwan ===
When Congress enacted the Foreign Relations Authorization Act for FY 2003 on September 30, 2002, it required that Taiwan be "treated as though it were designated a major non-NATO ally". Despite some initial misgivings about Congress's perceived intrusion into the President's foreign affairs authority, the Bush administration subsequently submitted a letter to Congress on August 29, 2003, designating Taiwan as a de facto MNNA.

=== Thailand and the Philippines ===
Around the same time as Taiwan's admission, invitations were sent to Thailand and the Philippines, both of which accepted the offer.

Singapore, a long-term host of a U.S. Air Force training squadron and a major U.S. Navy non-home port, was reportedly offered a similar arrangement as the Philippines and Thailand, but turned down the offer to allay concerns of its neighbors of strong Singaporean military ties with Australia, New Zealand, the United Kingdom, the United States, and Israel. However, in October 2003, President George W. Bush and his Singaporean counterpart Goh Chok Tong announced their intention to conclude a major bilateral Strategic Framework Agreement for a Closer Cooperation Partnership in Defence and Security (SFA), the details of which remained secret; it was signed on July 12, 2005.

=== Pakistan ===
The designation of certain countries as MNNAs has not been without controversy, as has been the case with Pakistan, which was designated as an MNNA by President George W. Bush in 2004. In 2017, Ted Poe (R–TX) and Rick Nolan (D–MN) from the House of Representatives introduced H.R. 3000; a bill to revoke Pakistan's position as an MNNA, citing inadequate counterterrorism efforts, the harboring of Osama bin Laden, and consistent Pakistani support for the Taliban. The bill never received a vote, but in 2021, U.S. Representative Andy Biggs introduced H.R. 35 — another version of the legislation.

In 2017, Joseph Dunford, erstwhile chairman of the Joint Chiefs of Staff, accused Pakistan's Inter-Services Intelligence of having ties to terrorist groups. Reuters reported that "possible Trump administration responses being discussed include expanding U.S. drone strikes and perhaps eventually downgrading Pakistan's status as a major non-NATO ally." In January 2023, Biggs introduced a bill to remove Pakistan's MNNA status.

=== Tunisia ===
In May 2015, President Barack Obama declared his intention to designate Tunisia as an MNNA while hosting his Tunisian counterpart Beji Caid Essebsi at the White House.

=== Brazil ===
In 2019, President Donald Trump designated Brazil as an MNNA for "Brazil's recent commitments to increase defense cooperation with the United States" after receiving a working visit from his Brazilian counterpart Jair Bolsonaro.

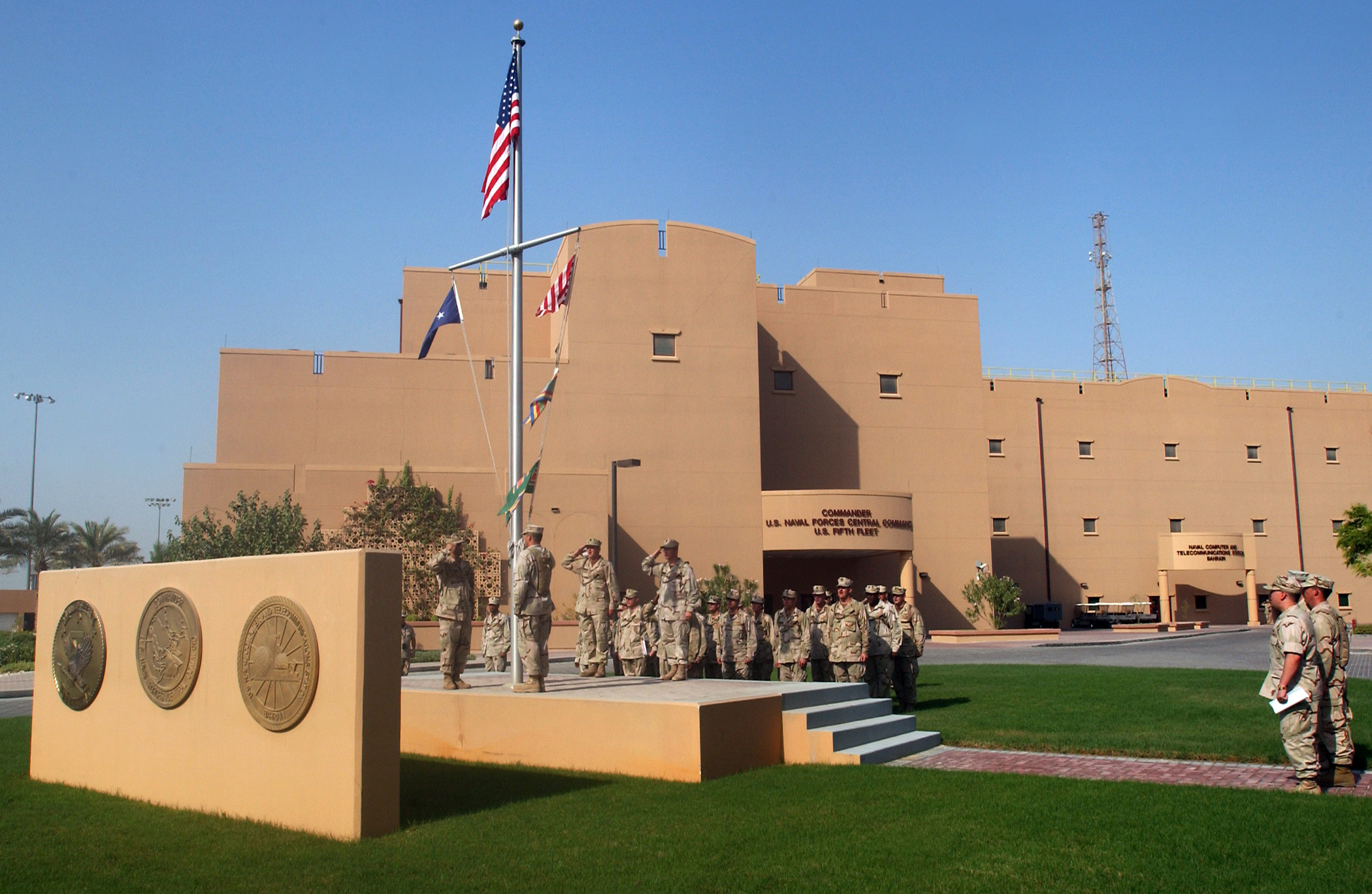
NSA Bahrain base is home to US Naval Forces Central Command and US Fifth Fleet.

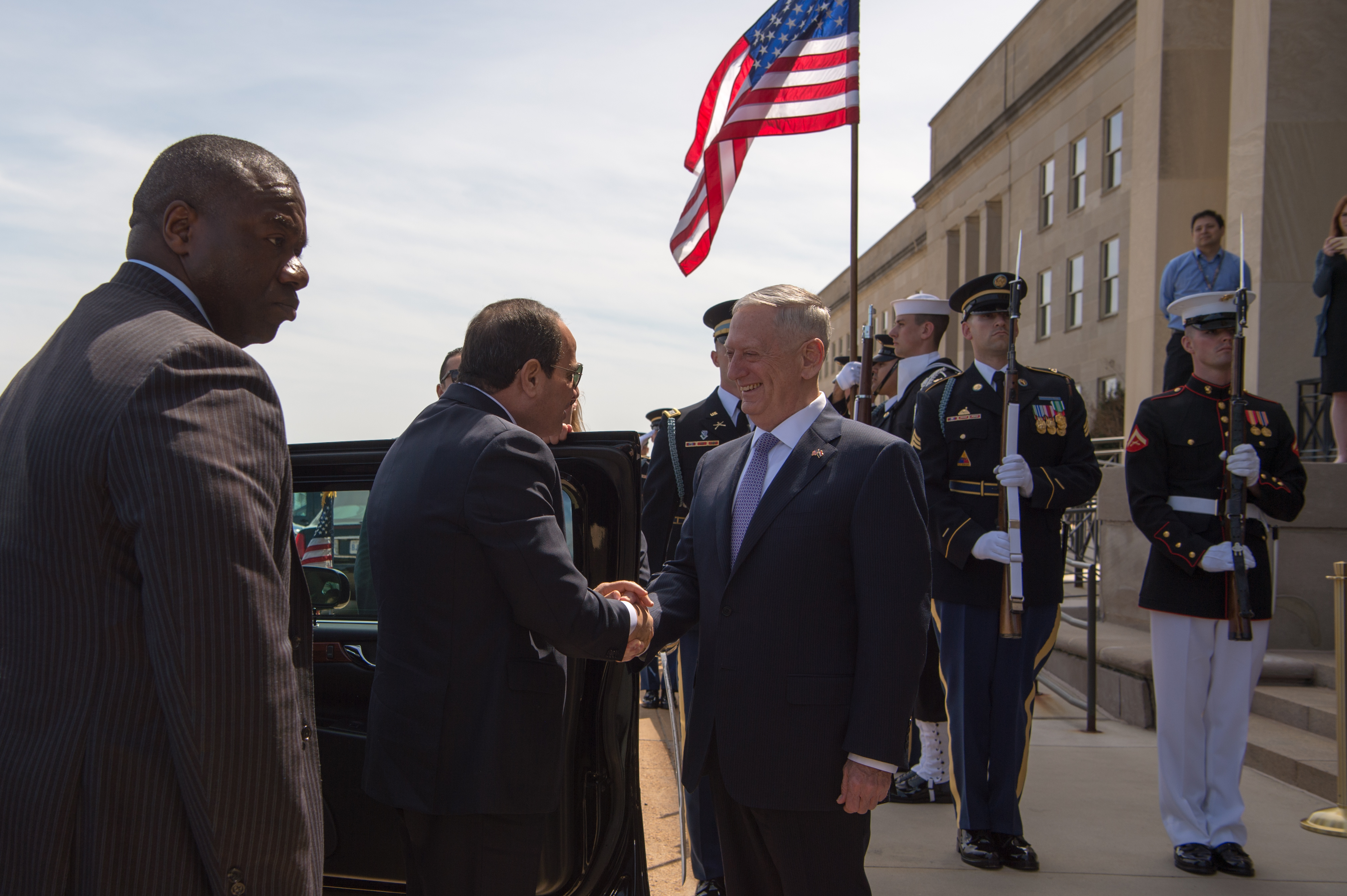
Defense Secretary Jim Mattis meets with Egypt's President Abdel Fattah el-Sisi during a meeting held at the Pentagon, April 5, 2017.

=== Qatar ===
On January 31, 2022, President Joe Biden announced that Qatar would be designated as an MNNA, citing its assistance during the United States' withdrawal from Afghanistan in 2021. "This past year, our partnership with Qatar has been central to many of our most vital interests", Biden commented. "I'm notifying Congress that I will designate Qatar as a major non-NATO ally to reflect the importance of our relationship; I think it's long overdue". This relationship serves as a major upgrade for the relations between the U.S. and Qatar. It is the third country in the Gulf region to become a major non-NATO ally after Bahrain and Kuwait.

On September 29, 2025, President Donald Trump signed an executive order guaranteeing U.S. support for the defense of Qatar if it receives an "armed attack," promising a U.S. military response to such aggression. The order represents a commitment by Trump and his administration and is not a legally-binding treaty, which would have to be approved by at least two-thirds of the Senate in order for the president to ratify it.

=== Colombia ===
In March 2022, President Joe Biden designated Colombia as an MNNA, stating: "I've said for a long time Colombia is a keystone to our shared efforts to build a hemisphere as prosperous, secure and democratic ... Today I'm proud to announce that I intend to designate Colombia a major non-NATO ally because that's exactly what you are. A major, Major non-NATO ally."

=== Kenya ===
On May 23, 2024, President Joe Biden announced that Kenya would be the 20th nation granted MNNA status, in recognition of its willingness to lead an intervention in Haiti, which went into effect a month later on June 24.

=== Saudi Arabia ===
Following his meeting with Crown Prince Mohammed bin Salman, President Donald Trump announced on November 18, 2025 that Saudi Arabia would be designated as an MNNA. Trump also stated he and Salman signed an "historic strategic defense agreement".

The designation, aimed at expanding bilateral military cooperation, accompanied Riyadh's pledge to increase its planned U.S. investments from US$600 billion to $1 trillion and Trump's confirmation that the U.S. will sell F-35 fighter jets to the kingdom, making it the first Middle Eastern state outside Israel to obtain the aircraft. Trump, noting the U.S. already counts 19 major non-NATO allies, said the strengthened partnership would advance shared security interests, while also remarking controversially on the 2018 killing of journalist Jamal Khashoggi. The White House added that Saudi Arabia intends to purchase nearly 300 U.S. tanks.

=== Peru ===
On December 12, 2025, President Donald Trump stated his intention to designate Peru as an MNNA, as part of an outreach effort to Latin American partners while the administration escalated its campaign against Venezuela and alleged narco-terrorists.

== Potential MNNAs ==
Some other countries have been proposed for granting MNNA status.

=== Ukraine, Georgia, and Moldova ===
In 2014, after Russian annexation of Crimea formally triggered the Russo-Ukrainian war, Ukraine's government requested MNNA status. That year, a bill was introduced to Congress to grant MNNA status to Georgia, Moldova, and Ukraine. Russia has been occupying parts of Georgia since the Russo-Georgian War in 2008, and Russian troops have also stationed in Moldova's breakaway state of Transnistria since the 1990s. In May 2019, a bill to designate Ukraine as an MNNA was introduced into the House of Representatives. As of 2023, these changes have not been made, despite support from the U.S. Commission on Security and Cooperation in Europe following the Russian invasion of Ukraine.

=== United Arab Emirates and Oman ===
During a 2015 summit at Camp David with members of the Gulf Cooperation Council, the Obama administration considered designating Saudi Arabia, the United Arab Emirates, Oman, and Qatar as MNNAs. Qatar was later designated a MNNA by the Biden administration in 2022, followed by Saudi Arabia in 2025 by the second Trump administration. In 2024, the United States recognized the United Arab Emirates as a major defense partner.

=== Iraq ===
Since 2008, Iraq and the United States have a strategic partnership that was formalized in their Strategic Framework Agreement. It covers a range of areas, including security, economics, and culture. The United States has provided military and economic aid to Iraq since the overthrow of Saddam Hussein during the 2003 invasion of Iraq. Following the rise of the Islamic State in the mid-2010s, American troops were again deployed to Iraq in order to support the Iraqi military in their fight against the militant group. Although most American troops withdrew from Iraq in 2021, the United States has continued to provide military and economic assistance to the Iraqi government.

=== Mexico ===
After Colombia's nomination as an MNNA, some have proposed designating Mexico as well.

=== Ecuador ===
Law makers have proposed giving Ecuador the status of major non-NATO ally.

== Benefits ==
Countries designated as MNNAs are eligible for the following benefits:

- Entry into cooperative research and development projects with the Department of Defense (DoD) on a shared-cost basis;
- Participation in certain counterterrorism initiatives;
- Purchase of depleted uranium anti-tank rounds;
- Priority delivery of military surplus (ranging from military rations to naval ships);
- Possession of War Reserve Stocks of DoD-owned equipment that are kept outside of American military bases;
- Loans of equipment and materials for cooperative research and development projects and evaluations;
- Permission to use American financing for the purchase or lease of certain defense equipment;
- Reciprocal training;
- Expedited export processing of space technology;
- Permission for the country's corporations to bid on certain DoD contracts for the repair and maintenance of military equipment outside of the United States.

== Major partners ==
=== India as a major defense partner ===
India and the United States have significantly expanded defense and strategic cooperation since the early 21st century. In June 2016, the United States designated India a Major Defense Partner, a unique status intended to facilitate greater defense trade and technology sharing. The designation was later codified into U.S. law through the John S. McCain National Defense Authorization Act for Fiscal Year 2019. This occurred less than a month after the House of Representatives passed the India Defense Technology and Partnership Act. This allowed India to buy more advanced and sensitive technologies on par with those of the United States' closest allies and partners.

India and the United States have also concluded several foundational defense agreements, including the Logistics Exchange Memorandum of Agreement (2016), the Communications Compatibility and Security Agreement (2018), the Basic Exchange and Cooperation Agreement (2020) which expanded interoperability and intelligence sharing between the two militaries, and the pre-existing General Security of Military Information Agreement signed in 2002 that was further augmented by the Industrial Security Annex, signed in 2019,

In June 2019, American lawmakers provided for enhancements to the strategic status of India, though this fell short of designating the country as an MNNA.

Some analysts have described the level of cooperation between the two countries as comparable to that of certain United States major non-NATO allies, although India continues to emphasize its policy of strategic autonomy and has not sought formal alliance status.

== See also ==
- AUKUS
- Arab–Israeli alliance against Iran
- Balkan Pact
- Enlargement of NATO
- Five Power Defence Arrangements
- Foreign relations of NATO (including NATO global partners)
- International Maritime Security Construct
- List of military alliances
- North Atlantic Treaty Organization (NATO)
- NATO open door policy
- Quadrilateral Security Dialogue
- Partnership for Peace
