= SNT Dynamics =

South Korean defence company

SNT Dynamics Co., Ltd.
- Native name: SNT다이내믹스 주식회사
- Formerly: Yehwa Shotgun (1959–1994); Tongil Heavy Industries (1995–2005); S&T Dynamics (2005–2021)
- Type: Public
- Traded as: KRX: 003570
- Industry: Automotive; Defense; Machinery
- Headquarters: 599, Nammyeon-ro, Seongsan-gu, Changwon-si, Gyeongsangnam-do, South Korea
- Key people: Park Jae-seok (President & CEO)
- Products: Artillery; Autocannons; Casting and machine tools; Powertrains
- Revenue: ▲ ₩408 billion (2022)
- Operating income: ▲ ₩25.8 billion (2022)
- Net income: ▼ ₩23 billion (2022)
- Total assets: ▲ ₩931 billion (2022)
- Total equity: ▲ ₩659.1 billion (2022)
- Owner: SNT Holdings (42.27%); Treasury stocks (32.66%); Other (0.06%)
- Number of employees: 510 (July, 2022)
- Parent: SNT Holdings
- Website: Official website in English; Official website in Korean

SNT Dynamics Co., Ltd. (Korean: SNT다이내믹스) is a South Korean defense and commercial auto parts, autocannons and machine tools manufacturer founded in 1959. Its heavy weapons equip most frontline units of the Republic of Korea Armed Forces. The company was designated as a defense contractor by the South Korean government in April 1973. SNT Dynamics also holds the rights to production and export licenses as the secondary supplier of Allison Transmission, an American commercial automatic transmission manufacturer.

== History ==
SNT Dynamics was established in April 1959 under the name Yehwa Shotgun (Korean: 예화 산탄공기총 제작소; Hanja: 銳和散彈空氣銃製作所; RR: Yehwa Santan Gonggichong Jejakso). In 1995 it changed its company name to Tongil Heavy Industries Co. Ltd. and in 2005 it changed its name to S&T Dynamics Co. Ltd. In 2006 it completed the acquisition of Daewoo Precision Industries, now SNT Motiv. On 26 February 2021, the company name was changed from S&T Dynamics to SNT Dynamics and on 28 February 2023 the company changed its South Korean domain.

== Product ==
=== Defense ===
==== Powertrains ====
- EST15K transmission, in use on the Altay main battle tank
- X1100-5A3 transmission, in use on the K9 Thunder, K10 ARV, T-155 Fırtına and AHS Krab (licensed production)
- XTG411-2A transmission, in use on the K55 SPH and K77 fire direction center vehicle (licensed production)
- XTG411-4A transmission, in use on the MX992 and Stingray light tank (licensed production)
- HMPT500-3EK transmission, in use on the K-SAM Pegasus and K30 Biho (licensed production)
- HMPT500-4EK transmission, in use on the K21 infantry fighting vehicle (licensed production)
- X200-5K transmission, in use on the K200 APC and M113 APC (licensed production)

==== Autocannon and artillery systems ====
- KM120 120 mm self-propelled mortar
- M2 Browning machine gun as the K6 HMG with a modification for a quick-change barrel (licensed production)
- M61 Vulcan 20 mm rotary cannon as the KM168 produced since 1977 (licensed production)
- M39 cannon 20 mm cannon as the M39A3, in use on the KF-5E (licensed production)
- KKCB 30 mm cannon produced since 2001, in use on the K30 Biho self-propelled anti-aircraft weapon
- 40L/70K Nobong 40 mm twin naval cannon developed in 1996 to replace the OTO Melara DARDO CIWS of the South Korean Navy
- K40 40 mm cannon produced since 2008, in use on the K21 Infantry fighting vehicle
- Remote Controlled Weapon Station (RCWS)
- XK13 25 mm Korean OCSW. Cancelled in 2013.
- Bofors 40 mm cannon as the 40L/70K produced since 1995 (licensed production)

==== Protection systems ====
- DAGAIE NG anti-guided weapons decoy system (licensed production)
- KM138 automatic land mine dispenser
- K18 smoke grenade launcher, in use on the South Korean M48 Patton main battle tank
- KM250 smoke grenade launcher, in use on the K1 and K1A1 main battle tank
- KM255 smoke grenade launcher, in use on the K2 Black Panther main battle tank
- KM259 smoke grenade launcher, in use on the South Korean KM9 armored combat earthmover
- KM260 smoke grenade launcher, in use on the K200 infantry fighting vehicle
- Soft-kill launcher system (SLS), in use on the K2 Black Panther

=== Commercial automotive parts ===
==== Housing assembly for trucks ====
- Daimler Housing assembly
- AAC (Axle Alliance Company) Housing assembly

==== Transmissions ====
- Transmission for 2 and 3.5 ton trucks
- Transmission for 4.5 and 5 ton trucks
- Transmission for 5 and 8 ton trucks
- Transmission for 9 and 12 ton trucks
- Transmission for 15 ton trucks
- Transmission for 18 ton trucks
- Transmission for 25 ton trucks
- Transmission for express buses and large buses

==== Axle ====
- T R3H Axle for sport utility vehicle (SUV) and recreational vehicle (RV)
- Axles for small sized trucks
- Axles for medium-sized trucks
- Axles for large sized trucks
- Axles for large buses
- Axles for low floor buses
- THR20S/ST hub reduction axle
- Independent suspension axle
- Axles for forklift
- Axles for light railway vehicles

=== Machine tools ===
==== Gear cutting machines ====
- H80
- H200
- H350
- H500
- P250
- GSP-1000
- GSV-320

==== CNC vertical lathe machines ====
- T850VD
- T1015VC
- T1622VC
- T2025VM
- ST-25/35V(C)
- ST-40/55V(C)

==== Grinding machines ====
- TNGP-35
- TNGA-33
- TGU(A)-32
- TGU(A)-35
- TGU-40

==== Universal lathe machines ====
- TIPL-410
- TIPL-5

== See also ==
- SNT Motiv
- Defense industry of South Korea
