= K&K =

K&K may refer to:

- Kevin and Kell, a webcomic
- Kenan & Kel, an American sitcom
- kaiserlich und königlich, the court/government of the Habsburgs
- Kath & Kim, an Australian comedy/sitcom TV series
- Kath & Kim (American TV series), an American comedy/sitcom TV series based on the Australian series
- Knox and Kane Railroad, a railroad in the United States
- Korn and Korn, a mathematics book

== See also ==
- KK (disambiguation)
