= Hell Is an Airport =

Studio album by Liquid Mike
- Released: September 12, 2025
- Recorded: 2024–2025
- Genre: Powerpop
- Length: 27:14
- Label: AWAL
- Producer: Mike Maple

Liquid Mike chronology
Paul Bunyan's Slingshot (2024)	Hell Is an Airport (2025)

Singles from Hell Is an Airport

Hell Is an Airport is the sixth studio album by American rock band Liquid Mike. It was released on September 12, 2025, distributed by AWAL. The album was generally well-received by critics.

== Background and recording ==
Known for their prolific musical output, Liquid Mike began work directly after work on their prior album. The band released their fifth album, Paul Bunyan's Slingshot, in February 2024, and a deluxe version with two new songs the following September. In the same month, the band released their first song from their then untitled sixth album, "Crop Circles", which a message from frontman Mike Maple stating that he had quit his day job at the US Postal Service to focus on finishing the album. The album was recorded, mixed, and mastered in its entirety in Maple's home studio. Much of the album was already completed well before its September 2025 release date; the song "AT&T" was the last song recorded for the album, being added last minute prior to completion in January and February 2025.

== Themes and composition ==
The album's title, Hell Is an Airport, ties into the album's overall theme, using the metaphor of an airport to express Maple's frustrations of feeling "stuck" in life. Maple explained:

"Airports are these weird, intermediary spaces that have always made me feel like I’m stuck in limbo. This album deals a lot with themes surrounding feeling stuck and unable to crawl out. Airports are stressful and congested and bureaucratic and never sleep; I imagine hell operates very much like an airport."

Maple expanded the feelings of being stuck, explaining that it came from the band's current status in the music industry; the band had become big enough to start touring, but not big enough to sustain itself on the music alone. At the same time, recording and touring took up enough time that it had become difficult to hold a job to supplement his income. Lyrics suggest Maple is to blame for some of the frustrations as well, grappling with feeling of boredom and unfulfillment in his life outside of music. Pitchfork noted that while the band's first five album's were themed around observations Maple made during his small town mail delivery day job, Hell Is An Airport "asks what happens when a hometown hero’s journey takes him outside of his familiar surroundings. A lot of what happens, it turns out, is more of the same...Most of these songs see Maple in head-on collision with the realization that the ennui of his home life won’t disappear once he hits the road.

"Instantly Wasted" was written about a dangerous car drive the band took in order to make it to one of their first major tours with Joyce Manor in time, following the completion and touring in support of prior album Paul Bunyan's Slingshot. "Lit from the Wrong End" was inspired by Maple injuring himself during sledding, and was written around the realization that one can't keep doing impulsive physical activity as they get older. "Crop Circles" and "Double Dutch" are both non-autobiographical accounts of family issues that Maple has observed in small towns. "AT&T" is about boredom felt by Maple while working at a retail phone store, and was also inspired by witnessing a close friend's romantic breakup with another person he knew. The track features less guitar-heavy sound, a rarity for the band. "Selling Swords" was written about the empty nature of modern shopping malls due to the retail apocalypse of the 2010s. The song's title comes from a character who sold swords (Will Forte) in the film Tim and Eric's Billion Dollar Movie (2012), a film centered around opening up a mall. The song is the only to feature a short bugle solo at the end; some publications compared it to alt country, though Maples describes the track as "definitely not a country song". "Meteor Hammer" was also inspired by a film; its sound and lyrics were Maple's attempt to write a hypothetical contribution to play in the background of the film Kingpin (1996).

"Grand Am" was the sole song to be written and performed by drummer Cody Maracek; Maple only contributed lyrics and vocals to the track. The song intentionally cuts off at the end; with the song being close to the midpoint of the album, Maple made this an allusion to it being the point in which one would have to turn over a vinyl record, as if the music was playing on a record player. "Groucho Marx" is written as a "pick me up" song, as a counter point to the album's overall theme of feeling "stuck". The title is an allusion to the Groucho glasses worn to look like Groucho Marx. The heavy nature of "'99" lead some publications to believe the song was in reference to the heavier type of rock and metal music that would populate festivals like Ozzfest in the late 1990s, though Maple states that the title is actually in reference to the year of one of his car. Lyrically it references relaxing summers and low-effort summer jobs of his past. "Claws" was written about Maple's struggles with sleeping, and his worries about meeting fan's expectations after the success of Paul Bunyan's Slingshot, juxtaposed with an energetic and upbeat sound. "Bad Lung" was written about a friend of Maple struggling to get their life together, written in a well-wishing tone. Tracks "Selling Swords" and "Groucho Marx" were described as sounding like 1990s era power pop.

== Release and promotion ==
The album's first promotional song, "Crop Circles", was first released in September 2024, well prior to the album's release. The album's name and release date, Hell is an Airport and September 12, 2025, was announced much later in May 2025. Two new songs - "Selling Swords" and "Groucho Marx" - were released at the same time. Two further promotional songs, "AT&T" and "Claws", were released ahead of the album in June and July respectively. "Claws" received a dog show-themed music video as well. The band embarked on a North American tour leading up to the album's release.

== Reception ==
Professional ratings
Review scores
Source	Rating
Pitchfork	7.2/10
The Line of Best Fit	8/10
Treblezine	Positive

Hell Is an Airport was Stereogum's "Album of the Week" upon its release. The praised the high quality of the short-length songs, and the strong lyrics, noting that "witty empathy keeps Hell Is An Airport from feeling too bleak or misanthropic." Pitchfork praised it quality despite it sounding similar to previous albums of the band, stating "The line between consistency and predictability is razor thin, and aside from the lyrical themes, Hell Is an Airport doesn’t deviate much from the band’s tried-and-true formula: compact songs with lyrics about boredom and burnout; muscular riffs; and overdubbed vocals that lend themselves to singalongs. It would get old if the songs weren’t so damn catchy." The Line of Best Fit shared similar sentiments, stating that "I could dock Hell Is An Airport points for following a well-charted course...But it's my humble belief that indie rock would be in a better place if more bands were this good at playing to their strengths...Liquid Mike may need to really shake things up eventually. But Hell Is An Airport only goes to show that day isn't coming anytime soon. After all, why reinvent the wheel when you've already discovered fire? The album placed at No.1 in The Alternative's Best of the Year list.

== Track listing ==
All tracks are written by Mike Maple.

Hell is an Airport track listing
No.	Title	Length
1.	"Instantly Wasted"	1:33
2.	"Lit from the Wrong End"	1:31
3.	"Crop Circles"	2:31
4.	"Double Dutch"	2:01
5.	"AT&T"	2:18
6.	"Selling Swords"	1:42
7.	"Meteor Hammer"	1:49
8.	"Grand Am"	1:31
9.	"Groucho Marx"	1:55
10.	"'99"	2:22
11.	"Claws"	2:02
12.	"Bad Lung"	1:16
13.	"Liam Gallagher"	2:49
14.	"Hell is an Airport"	1:54
Total length:		27:14

== Personnel ==
Credits adapted from Tidal.

- Mike Maple – vocals, guitar, production, mixing, mastering, engineering
- Dave Daignault – guitar
- Zack Alworden – bass
- Cody Maracek – drums, guitar and bass on "Grand Am"
- Monica Nelson – synthesizer
