= Liquid Mike =

American rock band

- Genres: Pop-punk, indie rock, alternative rock, powerpop
- Years active: 2020–present
- Members: Mike Maple; Monica Nelson; Zack Alworden; Cody Marecek

Liquid Mike is an American rock band from Marquette, Michigan. The band was formed in 2020 by frontman and primary writer Mike Maple, and has released five studio albums across the following five years. Notably, the band received wider recognition for their latter releases S/T (2023) and Paul Bunyan's Slingshot (2024). A sixth studio album, Hell is an Airport released on September 12, 2025.

== History ==
=== Formation and early years (2020–2022) ===
The band is fronted by vocalist and guitarist Mike Maple, and is also where the band gets its namesake. Maple moved from Ashland, Wisconsin, to the Upper Peninsula of Michigan in 2015 to attend Michigan Technological University. He began writing music in the following year as something to pass the time while living in a relatively remote small town. Maple started writing material with girlfriend and future band member Monica Nelson as early as 2016, but the band itself did not officially form until 2020, when the two moved to Marquette, Michigan and met drummer Cody Maracek. After some successful jam sessions, they decided to form a band; Maple on vocals and guitar, Nelson on backing vocals and synthesizer, Maracek on drums, and Zack Alworden on bass.

With Maple as a prolific music writer, the band released three albums across 2021 and 2022; Stuntman (2021), You Can Live Forever in Paradise on Earth (2021), and A Beer Can and a Bouquet (2022). With the first two albums, Maple wrote most of the songs in a standard song structure consisting of a verse-chorus form with an occasional bridge or guitar solo. By the third album, Maple switched to shorter, less repetitive songs that often only had a single verse, chorus and bridge, a format he'd continue into future albums.

=== S/T and Paul Bunyan's Slingshot (2023–2024) ===
The band saw an increase in popularity following the release of their fourth studio album, S/T (2023). In April 2023, Camp Trash guitarist Keegan Bradford shared the album on Twitter. That led to the band going viral on the platform. The album was the first Liquid Mike recorded together in the same room as a quartet, and after its rise in popularity, the band added a second guitarist (Dave Daignault, who had worked with Maple for years prior).

In February 2024, the band released their fifth studio album, Paul Bunyan's Slingshot. The release was praised by critics, being named one of the best album releases of February 2024 by Consequence, and Paste magazine, and moved the band into mainstream, with Rolling Stone doing a full feature on the band. A deluxe edition of the album, with two new songs, "Man Lives" and "Man Dies", was released the following September. A non-album single, "Crop Circles", was released shortly after. The band toured in support of the album with The Wonder Years and The Menzingers.

=== Hell Is an Airport (2025–present) ===
In May 2025, the band announced a new album, Hell Is an Airport, scheduled for release on September 12, 2025. They also released two new singles, "Selling Swords" and "Groucho Marx", and announced that the previously released "Crop Circles" would also appear on the album. Finally, "AT&T" and "Claws" were released ahead of the album's release in June and July (respectively).

== Musical style and influences ==
The band's sound has commonly been described as power pop pop punk, indie rock, punk rock, and alternative rock. Maple described his view on the band's sound in 2024:

I do feel connected to power pop and the greater scene. I feel like power pop is more of a spectrum thing, where you don’t necessarily have to hit all of the [characteristics]...I could see people listening to us and being like 'This is not power pop…” I don't know. It gets into pop punk territory.

Consequence grouped the band as part of a 2020s "indie rock scene full of bands embracing power-pop's short runtimes, hooky priorities, and raw immediacy" with huge guitar riffs and choruses. They summed the band's sound up as "upbeat tempos, loud guitars, killer melodies, and a strict three minute cap when it comes to song length". Stereogum described the band's sound as "blown out guitar-pop". Rolling Stone magazine described their sound as "split the difference between Nineties pop-punk and Nineties indie-rock, tempering the petulant angst of the former with the latter’s winning resignation." Their sound has been compared to bands Everclear, Green Day, Weezer, and Guided By Voices. In 2024, Maple noted that the band had not recorded any of the band's albums in professional recording studios, preferring a more raw sound that comes from more informal recording settings.

Maple states that he was influenced by power pop music of the 1970s and powerpop music of the 1990s, but not power pop of the 1980s. Influence include Everclear and Sugar Ray. The lyrics of the band's first five albums, primarily written by Maple, were inspired by the things he would observe as a small town mail carrier; Pitchfork posited that their sixth album, Hell Is an Airport, "asks what happens when a hometown hero’s journey takes him outside of his familiar surroundings. A lot of what happens, it turns out, is more of the same."

== Members ==
- Mike Maple - lead vocals, guitar (2020–present)
- Monica Nelson - backing vocals, synthesizers (2020–present)
- Zack Alworden - bass (2022–present)
- Cody Maracek - drums (2020–present)

== Discography ==
Studio albums

- Stuntman (2021)
- You Can Live Forever in Paradise on Earth (2021)
- A Beer Can and a Bouquet (2022)
- S/T (2023)
- Paul Bunyan's Slingshot (2024)
- Hell Is an Airport (2025)
