= 2K =

2K or 2-K may refer to:

== Numerical ==
- 2000 (number)
- 2000, a year

== Video and images ==
- 2K resolution, a digital film resolution, display resolution, of 2048 horizontal pixels of data
- JPEG 2K, see JPEG 2000

== Music ==
- 2K (band), also known as The KLF
- 2K Sports Mixtape (2006), hosted By Clinton Sparks; produced by Dan the Automator
- Crazy 2K Tour, see ...Baby One More Time Tour by Britney Spears
- Will 2K, see Willennium, Will Smith's second solo studio album

== Video games ==
=== Video game publishers ===
- 2K Games
  - 2K Sports
  - 2K Play
  - 2K Australia
  - 2K China
  - 2K Czech
  - 2K Marin
  - Irrational Games (interimly known as 2K Boston)

=== Video games ===
- NBA 2K (video game)
- NFL 2K (video game)
- MLB 2K
- NBA 2K
- NHL 2K
- NFL 2K
- WWE 2K

== Other ==
- 2K-tan, see OS-tan, Japanese Internet meme
- Chaparral 2K, see Chaparral Cars was a United States automobile racing team which built race cars from 1963 through 1970.
- MSW 2K, see Windows 2000
- 2K, a model of Toyota K engine
- Two kingdoms doctrine, theological concept of separate domains for earthly and spiritual power

== See also ==
- 2000 (disambiguation)
- KK (disambiguation)
- K2 (disambiguation)
