= XAV =

XAV (eXperimental Autonomous Vehicle), is a highly maneuverable, light mechanized, four-wheeled unmanned vehicle that can be controlled from a remote station and used for field reconnaissance. In 2007 it was under joint development by South Korea's Agency for Defense Development (ADD) and Ministry of Information and Communication, with a budget of approximately $35 million, and planned to be fielded by 2012.

Two variants of the unit were envisaged, one for battlefield reconnaissance missions and another for light anti-personnel combat missions.

== Controls ==
The unit has GPS inputs, and can be controlled via remote or can move on its own using artificial intelligence.

== Possible technology transfers ==
Choi Chang-gon, the head researcher of the project, also hinted that the amount of research poured into developing and building the XAV might extend into civilian uses, such as police, fire fighting and construction.
