= KTOO =

KTOO may refer to:

- KTOO-TV, a television station (channel 10 digital) licensed to Juneau, Alaska, United States
- KTOO (FM), a radio station (104.3 FM) licensed to Juneau, Alaska, United States
