= Kritika Kultura =

Filipino academic e-journal

Kritika Kultura (KK) is the semi-annual peer-reviewed international electronic journal of literary, language and cultural studies of the Literary and Cultural Studies Program of Ateneo de Manila University, Philippines. It touts itself as "a pioneering academic electronic journal in the Philippines" and "the only academic e-journal of its kind in the Philippines today."

== Journal ==
Kritika Kultura has been selected for coverage in the Elsevier Bibliographic Database (EBD) effective 2009. According to EBD, the selection is "in recognition of its high quality and relevance to the scientific community." With this selection, KK is indexed in Scopus, the largest abstract and citation database of peer-reviewed research literature and quality web sources. The Modern Language Association indexed the journal on January 17, 2008. The Directory of Open Access Journals (DOAJ), which also indexed the journal, lists down its publication details.

Kritika Kultura's ISSN is 1656152X. Its subject matter mostly revolves around topics under languages and literatures. It was founded in 2002 and is published in English by Ateneo de Manila University in the Philippines. Keywords include: Philippine literary studies, cultural studies.

== Issues and topics ==
The issues and topics covered by the journal are described by anglistikguide.de as "an attempt to respond to the needs of the globalizing world of the academic in general and of Philippine society in particular." The journal addresses "issues relevant to the 21st century within these disciplines even as addressing those same issues would have to be precisely about crossing the very borders of these disciplines: language and literature and cultural policy, cultural politics of representation, the political economy of language, literature and culture, the production of cultural texts, audience reception, systems of representation, effects of texts on concrete readers/audiences, the history and dynamics of canon formation, gender and sexuality, ethnicity, diaspora, Philippine nationalism and nationhood, national liberation movements, identity politics, feminism, women's liberation movements, etc."

== Bibliographic data ==
Anglistikguide.de lists down the journal's bibliographic data. The journal's full title is Kritika Kultura. The journal is edited by Dr. Luisa Torres Reyes and published by the Literary and Cultural Studies Program of Ateneo de Manila University. The online journal formats its data as text/html; image/gif. It can be accessed via the URL www.ateneo.edu Its level is classified as undergraduate, graduate, and professional.

== Contributors ==
Since its founding in 2002, Kritika Kultura has published works of internationally noted writers and scholars such as E. San Juan Jr., Peter Horn, Bienvenido Lumbera, Neferti Tadiar, Doreen Fernandez, Harry Aveling, Suchen Christine Lim, Danton Remoto, Oscar Campomanes and many others.

According to its editorial policy, "Kritika Kultura is interested in publishing a broad and international range of articles on language and literary/cultural studies that appeal to academic researchers in government and private agencies and educational institutions, as well as members of the public." It is a (1) forum for the publication of such studies "authored by both Ateneo and non-Ateneo faculty and scholars" and as a (2) "site for the development of ideas and the fostering of debate in the areas of literature, language and culture, and language studies."

== Founder and editor ==
Kritika Kultura was first envisioned in 2002 by Dr. Ma Luisa T. Reyes, an associate professor with the Department of English at Ateneo de Manila University. The journal continues until today to be edited by her.

== Editorial board ==
Kritika Kultura's board of editors has several notable writers and scholars in literary, language and cultural studies, namely, Jan Baetens (University of Leuven, Belgium), Faruk Tripoli (Gadja Mada University, Indonesia), Regenia Gagnier (University of Exeter, UK), Inderpal Grewal (University of California, Irvine, US), Peter Horn (University of Cape Town, South Africa), Anette Horn (University of Pretoria, South Africa), David Lloyd (University of Southern California, US), Bienvenido Lumbera (University of the Philippines), Rajeev S. Patke (National University of Singapore), Temario Rivera (International Christian University, Japan), E. San Juan, Jr. (Philippine Cultural Studies Center, US), Neferti X.M. Tadiar (Columbia University, US), Antony Tatlow (University of Dublin, Ireland), and Vicente L. Rafael (University of Washington, US).
