= KTWO =

KTWO may refer to:

- KTWO-TV, a television station (channel 2) licensed to Casper, Wyoming, United States
- KTWO (AM), a radio station (1030 AM) licensed to Casper, Wyoming, United States
