= Paul Bunyan's Slingshot =

Studio album by Liquid Mike
- Released: February 2, 2024
- Genre: Indie rock; power pop
- Length: 25:35
- Language: English
- Label: Independent

Liquid Mike chronology
S/T (2023)	Paul Bunyan's Slingshot (2024)	Hell Is an Airport (2025)

"Paul Bunyan's Slingshot is an obscure sightseeing/art piece this guy in Gladstone, MI made a while ago before some teenager drunkenly cut it in half one night. I've always thought it was funny how many Midwest towns claim to be the home of Paul Bunyan or have some sort of connection to him because they're always the smallest little towns. The album is about living in a place like that."

— Liquid Mike vocalist Mike Maple on the inspiration for this album and its loose concept of Midwestern life.

Paul Bunyan's Slingshot is the fifth full-length studio album by American indie rock band Liquid Mike, released on February 2, 2024. The album has received positive reviews from critics.

== Reception ==
At BrooklynVegan, Andrew Sacher included this among the notable releases off the week, writing that "it seems poised to be their breakthrough because of the conditions, but it also sounds like their breakthrough, with louder, thicker production than the band's earlier releases". Jonah Krueger of Consequence of Sound called this album nearly "power pop perfection" with "upbeat tempos, loud guitars, killer melodies, and a strict three minute cap when it comes to song length" and chose this as his album of the month. Writing for Exclaim!, Spencer Nafekh-Blanchette rated this release a 7 out of 10, stating "that [it] further refines the band's unique sound", as "a fun and ambitious (but not too ambitious) expansion... filled with nostalgia, depravity and authentic introspection in its calmest and most effective moments". The Fader listed this among the best releases of the week, where critic David Renshaw stated that it "harks back to a quieter time, a pre-social media age where kids were regularly left to their own devices as long summer days unspooled in front of them".

In Paste, Matt Mitchell chose "American Caveman" as one of the best songs of the week prior to this album release, calling it "an absolutely mythical piece of rusted-out post-punk and pop song" and fellow critic Grace Robins-Somerville rated this album an 8.3 out of 10 for being "a collection of songs about getting up to dumb shenanigans for no reason beyond boredom" that has "hidden, heartfelt depths"; the editors chose this as a Paste Pick and one of the best albums of the month. The editorial staff at Rolling Stone included Paul Bunyan's Slingshot as a "Hear This" pick and reviewer Jon Dolan called the music "short, fast, muscular songs that split the difference between Nineties pop-punk and Nineties indie-rock, tempering the petulant angst of the former with the latter's winning resignation" that "leaves a lasting impression". In Spin, Ben Salmon scored this release an A−, characterizing it as "pitch-perfect power pop" that he compares favorably to Guided by Voices. Editors at Stereogum chose this for Album of the Week and critic Tom Breihan called this an album with good writing that "is longer and more expansive than past Liquid Mike records" and continued that if it "catches you on the right day, Liquid Mike might sound like they're singing about you".

A June 4 roundup of the best albums of the year so far by Consequence of Sound included this release at 18 and Jonah Krueger called it "razor sharp", with "hummable riffs, huge choruses, and sticky refrains". The same day, Stereogum published a similar review and ranked this 30, with Chris DeVille stating "there's a universal appeal to its post-Weezer power chord sugar rush" in the music.

Prior to this album's release, Liquid Mike was considered one of the most anticipated acts of 2024. In Alternative Press, Neville Hardman previewed this release as one where "they'll up the absurdity and continue to poke fun at Midwestern living" and called out "K2" as a standout track. Jeff Yerger wrote a profile of the band for Stereogum in late 2023 and stated that Liquid Mike "sound like a band ready to embrace the sudden attention" and they "also sound confident as hell".

== Track listing ==
1. "Drinking and Driving" – 2:04
2. "K2" – 2:15
3. "Town Ease" – 2:12
4. "Mouse Trap" – 2:37
5. "Drug Dealer" – 1:44
6. "AM" – 1:08
7. "Pacer" – 2:10
8. "USPS" – 2:34
9. "Small Giants" – 1:51
10. "Works Bomb" – 1:24
11. "American Caveman" – 2:46
12. "-" – 0:34
13. "Paul Bunyan's Slingshot" – 2:16

== See also ==
- 2024 in American music
- Culture of the Midwest
- List of 2024 albums
