= Foundational agreement =

The United States signs "foundational agreements" with its defence partners. These are "routine" agreements and include: General Security of Military Information Agreement (GSOMIA); Logistic Support Agreement (LSA); Communications and Information Security Memorandum of Agreement (CISMOA) and the Basic Exchange and Cooperation Agreement for Geospatial Intelligence (BECA).

== Signatories ==
The United States has signed over 100 foundational agreements with defence partners around the world. In 2020 India signed the BECA, having already signed GSOMIA in 2002 (and its extension the ISA in 2019), an adapted version of the LSA — Logistics Exchange Memorandum of Agreement (LEMOA) in 2016, and an adapted version of CISMOA — Communications Compatibility and Security Agreement (COMCASA) in 2018. It has signed Security of Supplies Arrangement (SOSA) on 23 August 2024.
