= K9 Thunder =

South Korean self-propelled 155 mm howitzer

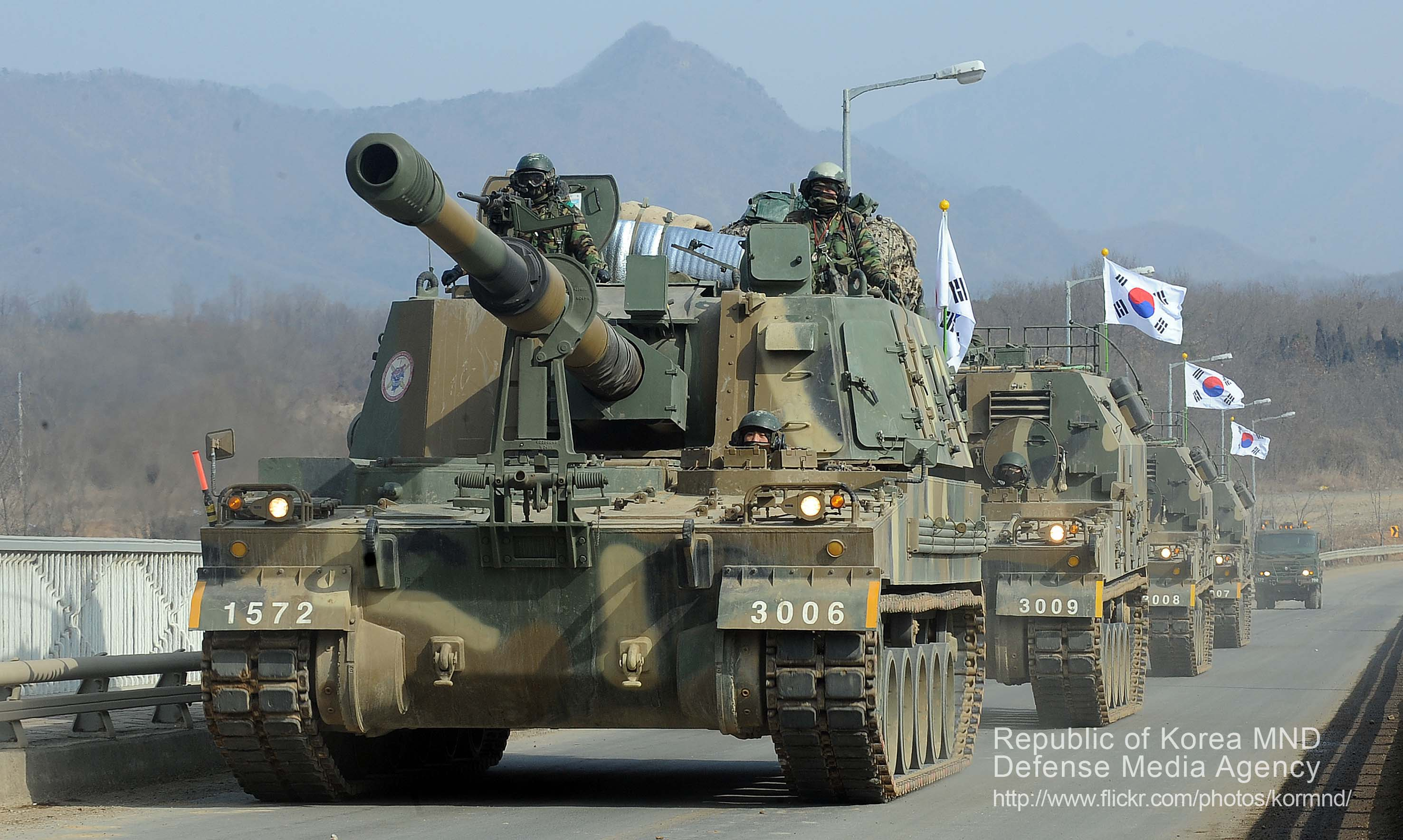
- Type: Self-propelled howitzer
- Place of origin: South Korea

Service history
- In service: K9: 1999–present K9A1: 2018–present
- Used by: See Operators
- Wars: Korean conflict; Bombardment of Yeonpyeong

Production history
- Designer: Agency for Defense Development (main developer); Samsung Aerospace Industries (integration and production); Kia Heavy Industry (main armament); Dongmyeong Heavy Industries (turret and suspension); Poongsan Corporation (ammunition)
- Designed: 1989–1998
- Manufacturer: Samsung Aerospace Industries (1998–2000); Samsung Techwin (2000–2015); Hanwha Techwin (2015–2017); Hanwha Land Systems (2017–2019); Hanwha Defense (2019–2022); Hanwha Aerospace (2022–present)
- Unit cost: 4 billion KRW (ROK Armed Forces, 2021)
- Produced: K9: 1998–2018; K9A1: 2018–present
- No. built: 1,900 (2025)
- Variants: See variants and upgrades

Specifications
- Mass: K9 & K9A1: 47 t (46 long tons; 52 short tons), combat K9A2: 48.5 t (47.7 long tons; 53.5 short tons), combat, with metal track
- Length: Overall: 12 m (39 ft 4 in); Hull: 7.44 m (24 ft 5 in)
- Width: 3.4 m (11 ft 2 in)
- Height: 2.73 m (8 ft 11 in)
- Crew: K9 & K9A1: 5 (commander, driver, gunner, assistant gunner, loader) K9A2: 3 (commander, driver, gunner)
- Rate of fire: 3 rds / 15 sec (burst); 6~8 rds / min (max); 2~3 rds / min (sustain)
- Maximum firing range: 18 km (M107, HE); 30 km (M549A1, RAP/HE); 36 km (K310, BB/DP-ICM); 41 km (K307, BB/HE); 54 km (K315, LAP/HE)
- Sights: Panoramic scope (manual mode); Safran MINEO DFSS (option)
- Armour: POSCO MIL-12560H armor steel (South Korean produced variants only, after 2022) Bisalloy armour steel (foreign licensed variants, after 2022) Spall liner (option); Plasan add-on armor (option)
- Main armament: Hyundai WIA CN98 155 mm 52 caliber, 48 rounds
- Secondary armament: SNT Dynamics K6 12.7x99 mm NATO HMG
- Engine: STX Engine/MTU Friedrichshafen MT881Ka-500 8-cylinder water-cooled diesel engine 735 kW (1,000 hp) @ 2,700 rpm STX Engine SMV1000 8-cylinder water-cooled diesel engine 735 kW (1,000 hp) @ 2,700 rpm (available since 2024)
- Power/weight: 21.3 hp/t (15.88 kW/t)
- Transmission: SNT Dynamics/Allison Transmission X1100-5A3; 4 forward, 2 reverse
- Suspension: Mottrol/Horstman Hydropneumatic Suspension Unit (HSU); Travel distance: ≤ 275 mm Dead weight: 40–45 kN
- Ground clearance: 410 mm (16 in) longitudinal slope: 60 % lateral slope: 30 % vertical: 0.75 m trench: 2.8 m fording: 1.5 m
- Fuel capacity: 850 L (225 U.S. gal)
- Operational range: 360 km (220 mi)
- Maximum speed: 67 km/h (42 mph)

The K9 Thunder (Korean: K-9 자주곡사포; Hanja: K-9 自走曲射砲; RR: K-9 Jajugoksapo) is a South Korean 155 mm self-propelled howitzer designed and developed by the Agency for Defense Development and private corporations including Samsung Aerospace Industries, Kia Heavy Industry, Dongmyeong Heavy Industries, and Poongsan Corporation for the Republic of Korea Armed Forces, and is now manufactured by Hanwha Aerospace. K9 howitzers operate in groups with the K10 ammunition resupply vehicle variant.

The entire K9 fleet operated by the ROK Armed Forces is now undergoing upgrades to K9A1, and a further upgrade variant K9A2 is being tested for production. As of 2022, the K9 series commands a 52% share of the global self-propelled howitzer market—including wheeled variants—for all systems delivered since 2000.

== Development ==
In the 1980s, the ROK Armed Forces embarked on the development of a new artillery system to contest North Korean equipment. The armed forces operated M107 self-propelled guns and K55 self-propelled howitzers. However, they had shorter firing ranges compared to M-1978 Koksan and were outnumbered by various North Korean artillery. With the success in designing and manufacturing the KH178 105 mm and KH179 155 mm towed howitzers, and experience gained by license producing the K55 (KM109A2), the Ministry of Defense ordered the development of a new system that would have a longer firing range, faster firing rate, and high mobility. The development started in 1989 and was led by the Agency for Defense Development (ADD) and Samsung Aerospace Industries (now Hanwha Aerospace).

Since 1983, the ADD researchers had been collecting and analyzing data for future artillery. They saw that burst fire and quick relocation would become the dominant factor in artillery battles and built an automatic loading system for testing in 1984. In 1987, the ADD offered an upgrade plan to the existing K55 inspired by the United States' M109 Howitzer Improvement Program (standardized in 1990 as M109A6), but was rejected by the Republic of Korea Army in 1988. As a result, and at the beginning of K9 development, the ADD was determined to create a new weapon system and worked on a conceptual model until 1991. Early concepts requested by the military included river crossing capability and the installation of M61 Vulcan as an anti-air weapon, which were later removed due to being unnecessary for such a long-range weapon.

In 1989, the only design data the researchers could obtain at that time were the provisions of the four-nation ballistic agreements, namely the United States, the United Kingdom, Germany, and Italy, to secure the homogeneity of the ammunitions—the new 52 caliber gun fires a NATO standard ammunition (L15A1) at a speed of 945 m per second from chamber volume of 3,556 cm^{3}. The first domestic design was prepared by extending and modifying the 155 mm 39 caliber gun used for the KH179. The first firing test was held in January 1992 but experienced many problems due to design errors.

In September 1990, a Korean developer visited the United Kingdom in search of turret design technology which was known to have been developed by British Vickers for AS-90. Vickers refused the technology transfer. Instead, the company offered the AS-90 for sale. The developer also visited Marconi, but the negotiations ended with an unsatisfactory result due to a high requested price. Therefore, developers pursued a domestic electrohydraulic driving system, using the experience in turret design and turret driving devices of the K1 MBT. The simulator was built in 1991.

The next year, researchers found that the disproportionate moment of the 52-caliber was twice of the K55. The balancing machine, which increased the capacity of the existing hydraulic balancing machine, did not sufficiently compensate for the imbalance moment value due to the change in the position of the armament. The driving force was very different depending on the driving angle. The same problem appeared in Germany's Panzerhaubitze 2000, which was under development. A joint research team from the ADD and Seoul National University of Science and Technology calculated an accurate theoretical model, and concluded that adjustment to system configuration was possible without major design changes.

Meanwhile, loud noise from hydraulic generators, which can cause hearing loss under long exposure, was also a problem. The engineers of the ADD and Dongmyeong Heavy Industries (now Mottrol) found that the noise was due to excessive shaking of hydraulic pressure, thus creating an experimental device using the principle of Helmholtz attenuators used in car mufflers. The noisy equipment became quieter and the hydraulic pulsation was significantly reduced. Overall, the domestic design showed driving precision of less than 1 mil in the standard error range.

In the winter of 1991, the ADD held talks with engineers from Samsung Aerospace Industries' special research institute. The ADD originally demanded that Samsung be in charge of system assembly only, as the company had no experience in developing its own tracked vehicle design despite having the experience in manufacturing K55 under license. The decision was overturned and the manufacture of the MTR (Mobility Test Rig) was decided upon. Samsung worked with KAIST on suspension and Seoul National University & Pohang University of Science and Technology on mobility systems. The engine was co-developed with American AAI Corporation. The test of the MTR was finished in November 1992.

In April 1992, BMY Combat Systems (now BAE Systems Land and Armaments) invited members of the ADD for its first M109A6 Paladin release ceremony and expressed interest in participating in Korea's self-propelled howitzer program by upgrading the K55 to Paladin standard. In May, members of BMY Combat Systems and Teledyne Brown visited the ADD, and suggested co-development of a new howitzer based on the P-52, a 52-caliber Paladin variant. This proposal was rejected by Korean developers. Later, during a Data Exchange Agreement meeting, South Korea and the United States confirmed that the U.S. had no claim to any intellectual property rights of the howitzer, to avoid possible disputes in the future.

From 1992 to 1993, the developers explored and confirmed the required operational capability, such as the system suitability of major components and the possibility of reaching the maximum firing range of 40 kilometers (25 mi). An internal review predicted that the howitzer would achieve a localization rate of 107 out of 235 (45.5%) technologies by the late 1990s. Unsatisfied with the review, South Korea decided to continue developing main system, main gun, 155 mm ammunition, fire control system, structure, and autoloader; meanwhile, the engine, transmission, and INS (inertial navigation system) were to be imported from foreign partners, and license produce hydropneumatic suspension to target 70% localization rate. The engineers faced the biggest challenges designing main gun and suspension due to lack of experience. While licensing the K55, its main gun was brought as a finished product and the suspension was produced from knowledge from the United States.

Based on a review of the required operational capability in October 1992, a firing rate of three shots within 15 seconds was chosen for economic feasibility. The rationale was that it is difficult for targets to be out of fatal range within 15 seconds after the first impact, and that the firing rate can be shortened depending on training level. If a firing rate of three shots in 10 seconds was demanded, it would have caused a huge increase in development costs as well as an unnecessary burden on researchers.

The development was delayed between March and August 1993 as a result of purge of Hanahoe, a private military club within the Republic of Korea Armed Forces, who aligned with military dictator Chun Doo-hwan, by president Kim Young-sam who was elected by democratic election. In addition, the army logistics department also refused to sign the letter of agreement for XK9 until a development plan for the maintenance elements is created. When the Joint Chiefs of Staff finalized the system development agreement in late August 1993, the Defense Ministry approved a prototype development plan in September and the president approved the project in early October.

Since domestically developed armor steel plates were applied for the first time, the researchers decided to produce and compare armor plates from both imported and domestic materials to reduce the risk. Meantime, Samsung began to train and employ master craftsman welders whose skills were verified by the U.S. Aberdeen Test Center. Armor plates went through a series of tests such as stress and ballistic impacts, and researchers verified that the domestic plate performed better than the imported plate.

The ADD saw that the HSU (Hydropneumatic Suspension Unit) provides better mobility and crew comfort. At that time, the HSU caused problems with some equipment and it was yet to be fully verified for durability, igniting controversy internationally. Therefore, it was inevitable to introduce and localize a British Air-Log (now Horstman) HSU that is used for the AS-90. However, when researchers applied the Air-Log HSU on the MTR and prototypes, they soon found that the HSU couldn't support heavier vehicles, thus failing the durability test. Since May 1997, engineers from the ADD and Dongmyeong Heavy Industries have spent a year on five redesigns and 11 durability tests. After the development of the new HSU, the design was exported back to Britain.

Developers changed the power pack for the MTR with the combination of an 850 hp engine from Detroit Diesel, which offered a smaller cooling system, and Allison Transmission's X1100 automatic transmission. This powertrain passed the tests on the MTR, but the engine failed on prototype vehicles due to low durability. The researchers looked for new engines from overseas. Perkins Engines and MTU Friedrichshafen showed interest in selling engines in August 1995. Perkins Engines offered the CV12 Condor, which was also used in the Challenger 2, but detuned to 1,000 hp. The price was slightly higher than that of Detroit Diesel; it was a relatively large 12-cylinder, which would require a design change on the chassis and there was a technical insufficiency of cooling devices. MTU's MT-881, though more expensive, offered a compact eight-cylinder with the same cutting-edge cooling system from the latest Euro Pack. The engine was also used for the PzH 2000 in Germany, and was undergoing trials in Germany and Canada. After examinations, the German design was chosen for the program, and was tested on an ATR (Automotive Test Rig) for a year starting in September 1997.

In the spring of 1992, the test gun experienced a detonator breakage caused by a differential pressure, at which the pressure increases in the opposite direction of the shell. After many years of failures and updates, researchers decided to change the shape of the propellant in 1997. The tiny pellets of the U.S.-style propellant, which have seven holes similar to briquettes, were replaced with 19 holes by mimicking the German style without knowing the specification. After numerous tests, the gun achieved a range of 40 kilometers (25 mi) below 53,000 psi in 1998.

A total of three prototypes were built and performed their first open trials in 1996. During the test, the prototypes succeeded in firing at distances of 40 kilometers (25 mi) and six rounds per minute, but failed to fire three rounds in 15 seconds. In December 1997, one of the prototypes was damaged by fire, due to failing complete combustion, after testing 18 rounds in three minutes. One researcher was killed and two injured. The damaged prototype's internal system survived the fire, and was repaired for further use. The prototypes fired 4,100 rounds and underwent 13,800 kilometers (8,600 mi) of mobility tests including extreme temperature conditions and various type of terrain such as ski courses during the winter season.

After firing 12,000 rounds and driving 18,000 kilometers (11,000 mi) over 10 years, the development was finished in October 1998 with the achievement of an 87% localization rate. (Note: Korean standard for localization rate of military equipment is based on the money value of product.) The contract for the Batch I of K9 artillery system was awarded to Samsung Aerospace Industries in December 1998. The produced vehicles were supposed to be delivered to the Republic of Korea Army. However, a 1999 naval battle between the two Koreas caused the delivery to be rerouted to the Republic of Korea Marine Corps. The first vehicle was rolled out in December 1999, and was given to the marines in Yeonpyeongdo.

== General characteristics ==
The K9 is of welded construction, using 20,000 kilograms (44,000 lb) of MIL-12560H armor steel developed by POSCO for K2 Black Panther project, which can withstand explosion pressure and fragments from 152 mm HE rounds, armor piercing rounds, and anti-personnel mines all around. The vehicle can protect crews from CBRN threats using an air-purification system.

The power-pack consists of a 1,000 horsepower (750 kW) MT881Ka-500 MTU Friedrichshafen engine licensed by Ssangyong Heavy Industries (now STX Engine) and an Allison Transmission X1100-5A3 transmission licensed by Tongil Precision Machinery Industries (now SNT Dynamics), and is installed on a hydropneumatic suspension chassis. Driven by Firstec driving system, the 47 metric tons (46 long tons; 52 short tons) vehicle has maximum speed of 67 kilometers per hour (42 mph) or maintains above 56 km/h at 60% longitudinal slope, and is capable of operating in various terrain conditions including desert, snow, jungle, and mountains. It can also be deployed as self-propelled coastal artillery for surface targets, creating a no-access zone within its firing range.

The main armament is a CN98 155 mm, 52-calibre artillery gun manufactured by Kia Heavy Industry (now Hyundai WIA), with a maximum firing range of 41 kilometers (25 mi) with K307 rounds. Or 54 kilometers (34 mi) with K315 rounds fired from the upgraded K9A1 variant. The CN98 is rated 1,000 EFC (equivalent full charge) with continuous firing under severe condition. The K9 stores 32 rounds in the bustle rack (16 rounds in each row), while an additional 16 rounds are stored at the rear of the hull (8 rounds on each side). Assisted by a semi-automatic feeding system, fire control system, and the Battalion Tactical Command System (BTCS), the vehicle can burst fire three rounds in 15 seconds and has the ability of multiple rounds simultaneous impact (MRSI) mode. It has a maximum rate of fire of six to eight rpm for three minutes (until emptying ammunitions store in the bustle), then reduced to two to three rpm for sustain fire (hand carrying ammunitions to feeder). The vehicle can shoot-and-scoot and be ready to fire in 30 seconds between stops or 60 seconds between maneuvers. After firing, it can relocate to a new position in 30 seconds to increase survivability from enemy counter-battery attacks.

A live fire exercise of the K9 battery of the ROK Army

The shells, fed from a K10 ammunition resupply vehicle, enter from the door behind the turret and are automatically rolled and loaded on the rack. When the shooting specification is decided, the chosen shell is placed on the tray in the center of the rack. A loader pulls the tray handle, and the shell slides into the carrier. Then the carrier repositions to the angle of shooting, and transfers the shell to the autoloader, which immediately "throws" the shell into the barrel.

The K9 uses the TALIN (Tactical Advanced Land Inertial Navigator) 5000 for its INS, purchased from Honeywell Aerospace after the announcement of the development of a ring laser gyroscope system that can withstand the shock from gunfire. The positioning device consists of a ring laser gyro that can detect up to one-ten-thousandth of Earth's rotational angular velocity, an accelerometer that can detect up to one-hundred-thousandth of Earth's gravitational acceleration, and a navigation computer that calculates using data detected by these sensors. This positioning device calculates the location of the self-propelled gun, the azimuth angle of the gun to the north, and the elevation and inclination angle of the earth's horizontal plane by itself. The calculated navigation information and posture information are provided to the fire control system, which has a positional accuracy within 10 m, an azimuthal accuracy within 0.7 mil, and an elevation and inclination angle accuracy within 0.35 mil.

The K9 has both manual (mechanical and optical) and automatic (electronic) fire control system. The manual fire control system is similar to that of K55, while the AFCS consists largely of a system controller, display, a shooting controller with a built-in ballistic program, a communication processor, and a power controller, and serves as an interface between the operator and the machine. Various electronic control devices such as positioning devices, gun & turret driving systems, ammunition transports, trigger devices, gun temperature sensors, and radios are interlinked to achieve automation. The AFCS uses ballistic programs and muzzle velocity sensors to calculate firing data on its own, as well as to receive shooting commands via data and voice communication from the BTCS. The FCS is the first of its kind in that it can calculate weather measurements by altitude, thus providing more precise shooting specifications.

== Further developments ==
=== Ammunitions ===
==== Extended range munitions ====
In October 2013, the DAPA announced a future plan for K9 upgrades along with a new extended range ammunition starting in 2014.

In August 2014, Hanwha and Poongsan were selected as the preferred bidders for new extended ammunition used for both the K9 and the K55A1. The two companies will compete to win the project.

In July 2019, Hanwha was removed from the new ammunition project due to unsatisfactory results, making Poongsan the sole bidder.

In November 2020, new extended-range ammunition by Poongsan was accepted for service after years of tests. The new ammunition combines BB (base bleed) with RAP (rocket-assisted propulsion), reaching 54 km with HE or 45 km with DP-ICM. The manufacturing will start in 2022, and will be operational by 2023. However, the introduction was delayed as 5 out of 77 items did not meet the standards during heat wave and cold wave tests.

In August 2023, Poongsang Corporation announced completion the 60 km extended range ammunition development. The new ammunition was expected to enter service in 2024.

On 6 February 2024, the DAPA announced completion of the 54 km extended range program. New ammunition, known as LAP, is scheduled for mass production in 2024.

On 29 May 2025 at MADEX 2025, Poongsan said the 60 km range ammunition named "ERM-HE" (Extended Range Munition-High Explosive) has 30 m circular error probability (CEP).

==== Special munitions ====
Poongsan also has been working on different types of ammunition, such as POM (PARA – Observation Munition) and GGAM (Gliding Guided Artillery Munition) since 2013 and 2014 respectively.

==== Foreign compatibility ====
In 2010, K9 test fired M982 Excalibur during Australia's Land 17 artillery replacement program.

In May 2016, K9 test fired JBMoU (Joint Ballistics Memorandum of Understanding) compliant HE-ER ammunition in Sweden successfully, reaching 43 km in distance.

In September 2022, a K9A1 SPH and a K10 ARV demonstrated compatibility with a variety of American munitions in a live-fire test at Yuma Proving Ground in Arizona. The howitzer managed to fire 3 rounds in 16 seconds and 6 rounds in 43.3 seconds using M795 projectiles. K9A1 became the first foreign platform to fire XM1113 RAP munition and achieved 53 km in shooting distance at an elevation of 900 mils.

In November 2023, Hanwha Aerospace signed a 160 billion KRW export deal with BAE Systems to supply a modular charge system (MCS) for NATO members.

In April 2024, Hanwha Aerospace conducted test fires of the M982A1 Excalibur Increment Ib at Yuma Proving Ground in Arizona using Norwegian K9 VIDAR variant. The K9 used various fuze modes and achieved less than one meter circular error probability (CEP) in Point Detonating mode and 5 meters above the target in Height of Burst mode from 50 km away.

=== Electronics and sensors ===
In 2004, KRCMI (Korea Research Center for Measuring Instruments) developed a Doppler radar calibration system, which significantly increased accuracy by lowering the impact error from 0.1% to 0.05%. Using the new technology, the ADD and DST (Davit System Technology) launched a joint project for a domestic MVRS (muzzle velocity radar system). In September 2007, DST announced the development of model MVRS-3000, increasing both performance and localization of the vehicle.

In February 2012, the Defense Acquisition Program Administration (DAPA) launched an arms localization project, which includes the K9's INS. In May 2012, Doosan DST was selected for the domestic INS development. The plan to install a domestic INS on the K9 was later changed to license production in 2015, while domestic models were to be used for the K21 and the K30.

In September 2015, offset trade was signed between Honeywell Aerospace and Navcours. Under the agreement, Navcours will license production and service of the TALIN 5000 INS, which is already being used in the K9 and K55A1, for domestic use, and supply Honeywell Aerospace as well.

=== K-AIC ===
On 20 June 2024, the Republic of Korea Army and Hanwha Aerospace signed an MOU on cooperation and support for the promotion of the Korea-Army International Course (K-AIC), a Korean weapons system curriculum that will begin in July. The program was created to provide Korean military regular training to nations that have purchased or plan to purchase Korean weapons. Under the agreement, the army will run separate training programs specialized for foreign soldiers twice a year in connection with various military schools, including the K2 Black Panther tank, the K9 Thunder self-propelled howitzer, and the K239 Chunmoo MLRS. Participants will also train on equipment and combat operation for four weeks and observe the Korea Combat Training Center (KCTC) as well as manufacturing plants.

Participants are divided into different courses based on the requirements of their home countries and their individual skill levels. They receive intensive, hands-on training that includes courses on K2 Tank Operations, K9 Self-Propelled Howitzer Operations, K2 Tank Maintenance, and K9 Self-Propelled Howitzer Maintenance. By training alongside officers from the Korean military, they have more opportunities to share practical knowledge and foster cooperation. The program is also divided into a basic course for the first half and an advanced course for the second half, allowing for a customized curriculum that fits the specific needs of the participating countries. The training starts with integrated education at Army Headquarters, followed by a systematic study of the K2 tank and K9 self-propelled howitzer, which includes theoretical lessons, simulator exercises, tactical operations, and live-fire and maneuver drills. In the final week, participants visit military units to gain hands-on experience with the actual weapons, improving their real-world combat skills.

Korea Army International Course
	Year	Participating members	Programs
1	2024-1	Australia, Egypt, Poland	K9, K2
2	2024-2	Australia, Egypt, Poland, Qatar, Romania, Turkey, Vietnam	K9, K2
3	2025-1	Poland	K239
4	2025-2	Australia, Egypt, Poland, Romania, Turkey, Vietnam	K9, K2

=== Logistics and operational improvements ===
In December 2006, the South Korean military distributed a digital manual for the K10. The manual was developed with a budget of 1 billion KRW. It can easily identify the equipment composition, specifications, operation procedures, operating principles, maintenance tips, and signs of failure of the K10 ARV. It visualizes the vehicle in 3D virtual reality, so operators can easily understand compared to conventional text-based manuals. After seeing significant improvement in training efficiency, operating capability, and soldiers' maintenance skill, a digital manual was also adopted for the K9 in May 2007.

In May 2018, an ABC (Automatic Bore Cleaner) model RB-155 by SDI (SooSung Defense Industries) was adapted for the South Korean K9. The automatic cleaner provides efficiency in maintenance by requiring just one person to clean the barrel in 20 minutes, with incomparable results compared to conventional cleaning.

As of June 2023, the localization rate is at 80%. Several minor upgrades were added, such as structural changes to the chassis to shorten the time to remove the power pack from hours to ten minutes.

On 8 December 2023, Norway, Finland, and South Korea signed an agreement for the two Nordic countries to share spare parts without submitting signed applications to South Korea. The agreement allows Norway and Finland to simply send a report after the parts sharing has occurred, which shortens processing time and thus improves logistics support.

=== Mobility ===
In October 2013, Daeshin Metal became the major parts supplier for Allison Transmission in making X1100-5A3 as an offset trade, further increasing localization. Applicated transmission will be equipped starting on the Batch X and the Batch V production of K9 and K10 respectively.

==== Domestic engine ====
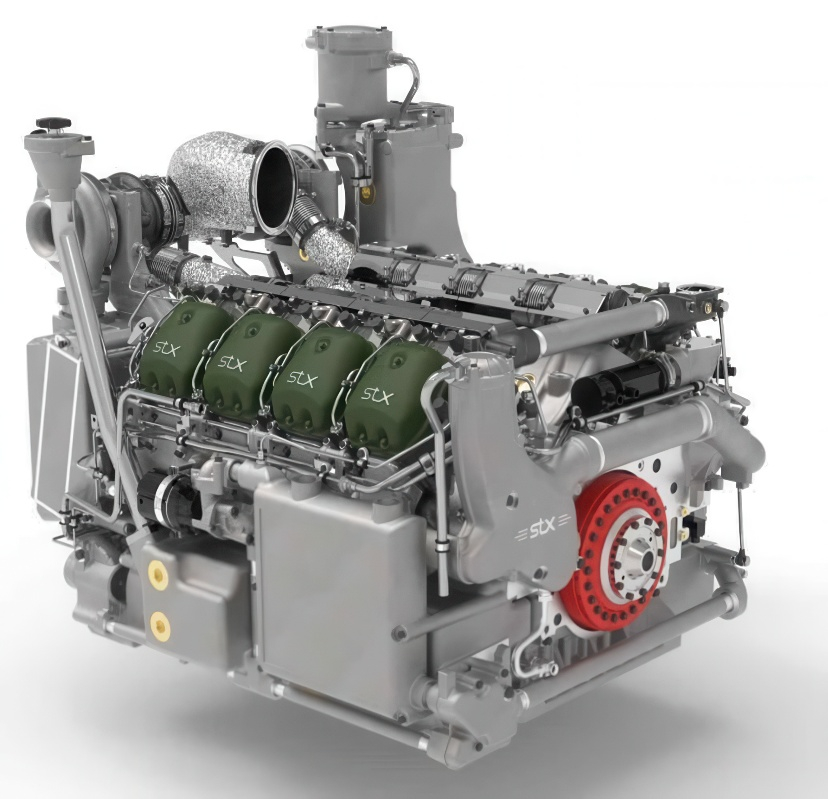
STX SMV1000 engine

In September 2020, the DAPA launched a project for indigenous engines for the vehicle. The project is expected to cost ₩75 billion over a period of 5 years.

On 31 May 2021, engine manufacturer STX Engine was selected as the winner after competing against Doosan Infracore (now HD Hyundai Infracore).

On 26 November 2021, British engineering company Ricardo PLC has won a contract from STX Engine to help develop a clean-sheet engine for the K9 howitzer. Under the contract, STX Engine engineers will embed with Ricardo's engineering development team to facilitate knowledge transfer and accelerate development. Ricardo stated that the objective was to integrate seamlessly with the K9 vehicle to enable South Korean to resolve license barriers for export.

On 21 September at the DX Korea 2022 exposition, STX Engine presented a newly designed 1,000 hp diesel engine for the K9.

On 8 December 2023, the media reported that STX Engine completed the durability test of the new engine, the SMV1000, and it will be installed on the howitzer for the driving test. The SMV1000 can be installed without requiring any structural changes to the K9, K10, or AS21 Redback, and is 76 kilograms (168 lb) lighter in weight, 5% better fuel efficiency compared to MT881, and has improved low-temperature startability. The SMV1000 will be installed in K9A1EGY and K10EGY for Egypt and AS21 for Australia. The new engine will replace the German design to avoid export restrictions. Egypt has purchased 355 engines at 134.8 billion KRW for its K9 program.

On 4 February 2024, the first K9 with the SMV1000 engine was revealed at the World Defense Show 2024 in Saudi Arabia, along with domestic automatic transmission from SNT Dynamics.

The STX Engine began mass production in September 2024 after completing the development of its domestic SMV1000 engine from 2020 to 2023 to circumvent export controls on German MTU engines in future export markets. With the development of domestic engines after three years of development, all 500 German-made parts previously used in German MTU engines have been replaced with parts developed in South Korea. The domestic engine will be proposed or supplied as an alternative to the German-made engine to countries that are banned from exporting German products when exporting the K9 in the future.

=== Protection ===
On 7 May 2021, Hanwha Defense announced a cooperation with the Australian company HIFraser in supplying AFSS for AS9 and AS10 for Australia. HIFraser will start to assist Korean company DNB Co in delivery of AFSS to Korean operated K9s as well.

In February 2022, Hanwha Defense signed a memorandum of understanding with the Australian company Bisalloy Steels in supplying armor plate for the AS9, AS10, and AS21 Redback to reduce manufacturing cost and to strengthen their partnership. Hanwha Defense plans to use armour steel from Bisalloy Steels for foreign exports, including an Egyptian variant, while POSCO continues to supply steel for domestic production.

== Upgrades ==
=== K9A1 ===
In September 2010, a major issue regarding the engine was brought up by the defense committee. According to the report, a total of 38 K9s experienced engine cavitation since 2005. Initial investigation prior to the discussion suggested that the use of 3rd party manufactured antifreeze may have caused the engine cavitation. Using the recommended TK-6-03-01012 antifreeze did not solve the problem, suggesting that the antifreeze was not the cause of the issue. A member of the defense committee mentioned that the Turkish T-155, which uses an identical mobile system but has an APU (auxiliary power unit) installed, never reported such a case. The military chose to study the issue further by monitoring how antifreeze affects the engine, and testing the APU when the vehicle is in idle. Installing an APU on the K9 was discussed during its development phase, but was not adapted for mass production.

In September 2011, the Defense Committee addressed issues regarding the K9 Thunder's FCS (fire control system), noting that its computer and OS (operating system) are discontinued and outdated, thus increasing related logistics cost by 70% over past 3 years. India expressed the same concern during evaluation. The first produced 24 K9s are equipped with i386 and the rest are with i486; DOS is installed on both types. On the other hand, Samsung Techwin argued that both the processor and the OS are widely used in the military including newly produced weapons, that older CPUs are more durable, and that DOS has a lower failure rate.

The military was determined to launch a FCS upgrade program starting in 2013 for both logistical reason's and Australia's request. In December 2013, the DAPA awarded Samsung Techwin as a main provider for the K9 upgrade program.

In March 2015, the South Korean military announced that Samsung Techwin was developing a driver's safety system, as a consequence of an accident resulting in the death of an operator in January 2015. Under the safety system, the turret rotation automatically stops if the driver's hatch remains open and is at a dangerous angle to the driver. The feature can be turned off if necessary.

In August 2017, the DAPA approved the serial production of upgraded K9s. K9A1 upgrades include an automatic FCS, combining GPS system to INS, an improved driver's night periscope with thermal frontal camera, a rear view camera, and a driver's safety system. The 8 kW auxiliary power unit (APU) is provided by Farymann & TZEN co, Ltd. A1 standard also allows to shoot new extended range ammunition. All Korean K9s will receive A1 upgrades along with a 12-year cycle overhaul at the Army Consolidated Maintenance Depot starting in 2018. The first K9A1 joined the Republic of Korea Army in August 2018. According to the magazine published by the DAPA in October 2024, South Korea plans to upgrade 600 vehicles to A1 standard.

Details of the K9A1 upgrade:

- Installation of APU : The APU allows the vehicle to react and fire without running the main engine, thus reduces fuel consumption. Crew members can operate without being exposed to the engine noise. Since the engine no longer needs to operate when the vehicle is stationary, the cost for engine maintenance was reduced.
- Enhanced driver's system : The driver's night periscope was changed from image intensifier to FLIR, and can be viewed from the monitor. A rear view camera was installed. The driver's safety system disables the turret to rotate at a certain angle when the driver's hatch is open. The feature can be turned off if necessary.
- GPS : By combining INS and GPS, the vehicle can locate itself more precisely and faster by complementing each other, which also increases accuracy.
- Enhanced FCS : The computer and OS are upgraded. Software such as a field manual and ammunition monitoring are installed. The FCS is fully automated by using an electronic fuse setter and ammunition management system. The new FCS occupies less space, and is programmed for new extended range ammunition (60 km).

=== K9A2 ===
In May 2016, the DAPA announced the concept for a robotic howitzer at the international artillery conference held in the United Kingdom. The DAPA then launched several projects consisting of insensitive charge, better rifling of the main gun, and a fully automated loading system. The upgraded K9 will have longer range, faster firing rates, and reduced crew members—similar capabilities to the United States' canceled XM2001 Crusader.

In August 2021, the ADD and Hanwha Defense completed the development of a high-response artillery automation system started in 2016. The new system is essential for a future remote controlled variant, and will enable a fully automated loading system including charges and fuse set—increasing the fire rate by 1.5 times. Developers originally designed munitions to be stored in the chassis. Due to the limited turret rotation, gun elevation, and to reduce the distance of munitions moving to the chamber for faster reloading, the location of the munitions was changed from the chassis to the turret.

The Republic of Korea Armed Forces will confirm the ROC for K9A2 Block-I upgrade in March 2022. The K9A2 is expected to be operational by 2027. The military is designing the K9A3, with a firing range of 100 km. The operational K9A2 technology demonstrator was revealed to the public by Hanwha Defense in February 2022. In March 2022, the high-response artillery automation system was shown to the public. The vehicle's turret is extended in length for installation of an autoloader. Its centre location is better than previous variants. The prototype weighs 48.5 t (combat) with metal tracks, which can be decreased by more than 2 t by switching to composite rubber tracks. Reduced weight can contribute to the installation of additional armor or subsystems.

In July 2022, the Defense Acquisition Program Promotion Committee approved a proposal of 2.36 trillion KRW for 2023 to 2034 in development, and an upgrade of the K9A2 Block-I.

In June 2023, the DAPA authorized the development of K9A2 Block-I with a budget of 2.36 trillion KRW for 2023 to 2027. South Korea plans to upgrade basic K9s to K9A2 standard, and achieve full operational capability by 2034.

During Eurosatory 2024, Hanwha revealed newer model of the K9A2, which resembles AS9 Huntsman rather than previous prototype with extended turret.

Details of the K9A2 upgrade:

- Enhanced main gun: New rifling and chrome plating will increase barrel life from 1,000 EFC to 1,500 EFC, longer range, and allow faster firing rate.
- High-response artillery automation system: Key feature of the A2 and future A3 upgrade. Reduces crew number from 5 to 3 (2 in emergency) by installing a fully automated autoloading system, which increases the maximum firing rate from 6 to 8 rds/min to 9 to 10 rds/min and sustain firing rate from 2 to 3 rds/min to 4 to 6 rds/min.
- Increased sustained fire: All 48 rounds are located in the turret, and are accessible with the autoloader.
- Turret driving system: Changes from an electrohydraulic to an electric driving system.
- Automatic fire suppress system (AFSS): Enhanced fire suppress system for crew protection.
- Remote controlled weapon station (RCWS): Enables use of a secondary weapon without exposing a crew member.
- Air conditioning: Increases crew comfort by cooling down the temperature.
- Modular charge system (MCS): Provides crew protection from secondary explosions due to enemy fire including heavy weapons, by adapting insensitive charge, and required for the automatic loading process.
- Composite rubber track (CRT): Provides crew comfort by reducing vibration, noise, and lesser required maintenance. Reduced weight improves the vehicle's operational range. The rubber has a lower fatality from fragments to surrounding soldiers, compared to metal when under attack.
- Enhanced armor: Anti-tank mine protection. Similar to the AS9 Huntsman standard.?

=== K9A3 ===
In 2020, the DAPA announced the K9A3 upgrade plan will apply unmanned technology and achieve 100 km shooting distance using gliding ammunition. The DAPA talked about the development of a super long-range cannon or a railgun to be mounted on the next generation of self-propelled howitzers.

In September 2022, the ADD began research into increasing the firing range of the howitzer. The new variant is expected to equip a 58 caliber gun, similar to the US Army's M1299 howitzer and ramjet munitions to achieve a maximum range greater than 80 km. The project is scheduled to be 60 months long, completing in August 2027. In November 2022, the Defense Acquisition Program Promotion Committee approved 440 billion KRW between FY2024 and FY2036 to develop and acquire precision guided munitions for the K9 platform.

In October at the Korea Army International Defense Industry Exhibition (KADEX) 2024, Hanwha Aerospace showcased a small-scaled model of the K9A3, which no longer resembles external appearance of earlier variants. Each K9A3 is remotely controlled by an operator from the K11A1 FDCV, and every K11A1 carries three operators and one commanding officer. To enable this, the K9A3 is equipped with LiDAR (autonomous driving assistance) and a driving camera(s) on the front, driving assistance cameras on the sides, and a remote communication device on the top of the turret.

== Variants ==
=== K10 ARV (ammunition resupply vehicle) ===
The K10 ARV is an automatic resupply vehicle based on K9 platform, sharing most of the components and characteristics. Its concept study started in November 1998 by Samsung Aerospace Industries and Pusan National University. Its design began in February 2002 by Samsung Techwin (previously Samsung Aerospace Industries), the ADD, and the DTaQ (Defense Agency for Technology and Quality), The army declared its completion in October 2005. The first vehicle rolled out in November 2006, with a price tag of 2.68 billion KRW. It was assigned to the 1st Artillery Brigade of the Republic of Korea Army. South Korea became the first nation to operate such type of military equipment.

The vehicle has a combat weight of 47 metric tons, and can support a K9 team by carrying and resupplying 104 shells of 155 mm artillery ammunition and 504 units of charges under heavy fire. The vehicle is operated by a 3-person crew, requiring only one loader by applying fully automated control system. It transfers ammunition at a maximum speed of 12 rounds/min. It takes 37 minutes to fully load, and 28 minutes to empty the K10. It is often called the briquette car by military and defense industry officials.

=== K10 AARV (armored ammunition resupply vehicle) ===
The K10 AARV is an enhanced protection variant of the K10 ARV. The first of its kind will be produced in Australia as the AS10.

=== K11 FDCV (fire direction control vehicle) ===
The K11 FDCV is designed for the Egyptian military to provide command and control, reconnaissance, and communication for armored vehicles. The vehicle is based on K10, and has a high mobility.

=== K11A1 FDCV ===
First appeared publicly at the KADEX 2024, the K11A1 FDCV is designed to operate up to three K9A3 howitzers remotely. Each K11A1 carries three operators and a commander, and two K11A1s are teamed up to control a total of six K9A3s to form a battery. The vehicle is armed with the K6 HMG-mounted RCWS with the capability to shoot down drones using AI technology, anti-air missile launchers, and additional armor plate for mine protection.

=== K9 Mobile Howitzer (K9MH) ===
K9 Mobile Howitzer (K9MH) is a K9A2 variant with Tatra 8x8 chassis.

== Operational history ==
=== 2000s ===
In October 2003, the K9 Thunder was evaluated by Spain at the military base located in Zaragoza.

In 2004, the K9 was sent to Malaysia to test its operational capability in a tropical rainforest environment.

=== 2010s ===
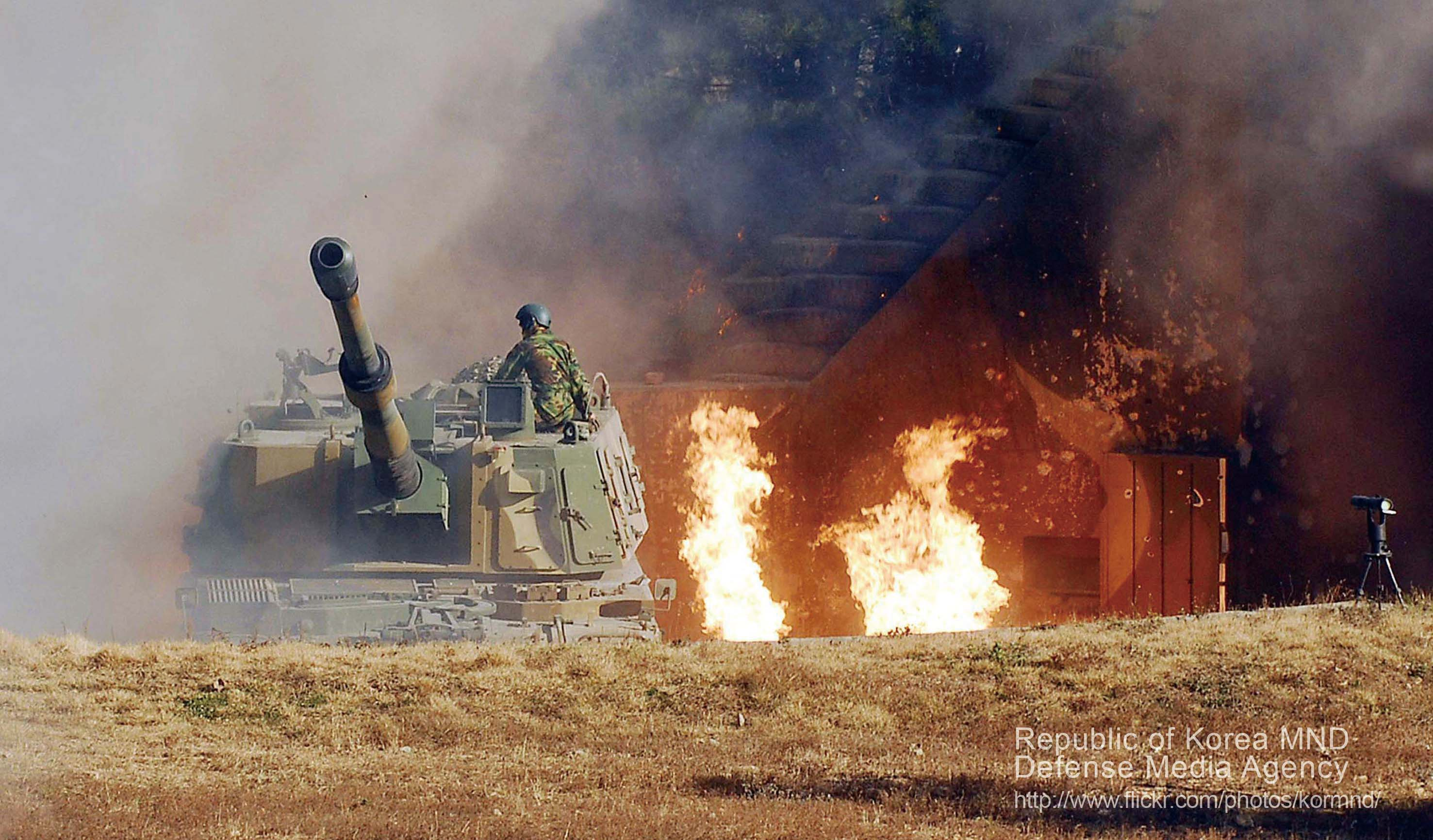
A North Korean artillery attack near-misses a K9 Thunder, igniting fire on charges placed outside of the vehicle in November 2010.

The K9 Thunder saw its first artillery vs artillery combat during the bombardment of Yeonpyeong in November 2010. After receiving a surprise artillery attack from North Korea, the 7th Artillery Battery of the Republic of Korea Marine Corps were tasked for a counterattack with the K9 howitzers stationed on the island. Prior to the attack, four howitzers had been on a scheduled firing exercise, and two remained in their fortified bunkers. During firing exercise, one vehicle had experienced a shell stuck in the barrel due to a misfire from a faulty charge. After the exercise, crews had opened the hatches of the vehicles and some had dismounted while waiting for the disabled gun to be fixed.

Howitzers on the island always store 20 shells of HE and flares combined, excluding training rounds, for a rapid response. The marines on the island had been operating the AN/TPQ-36 and AN/TPQ-37 radar, but the number of radar units was not sufficient to cover the long fortified North Korean coastline that the marines were facing.

The first wave of North Korean bombardment damaged three out of four guns participating in the exercise. Some howitzers received internal damage from shrapnel entering through opened hatches, and one vehicle had an external fire. However, none of the crews suffered casualties, with the exception of a sergeant who had a cut injury from shrapnel.

- Gun 1: communication system damage and external fire
- Gun 2: severe external damage
- Gun 3: communication system, autoloading system damage, and a crew injury
- Gun 4: barrel disabled from the exercise

After relocating to fortified positions, three howitzers (guns 2, 5, 6) fired back at the North Korean military structures located in Mudo because the marines were unable to track and locate the source of the attack. At the same time, marines worked on restoring communication with guns 1 and 3 by installing wires. Gun 1 went through extensive fire extinguishing while gun 3 joined the firing mission by switching automatic loading to manual loading.

Four howitzers were able to employ counter-battery fire during the second wave of the North Korean attack. The radar detected the KPA artillery positions in Kaemori, and two militaries exchanged artillery fire. The KPA attack caused a blackout of the ROK base, but the marines responded with an emergency generator. Additional and different types of ammunition were supplied by hand-carrying at the gun emplacements.

In May 2011, K9 performed direct shooting for the first time. K9 can strike bullseye from a distance of 1 km with direct fire. Per ROK military guidelines, the K9 fires ammunition with the maximum propellants (stage 6) to achieve a muzzle velocity of 1,0XX m/s, which changes based on the temperature of the gun, to maintain a straight line of ballistics for the targets at 400 meters while setting the limit of the maximum effective range at 1,500 meters (without the gunner's optics).

The live fire exercise of the ROK Marine Corps to prepare for the North Korean long-range artillery attack

In August 2016, the K9 was tested by the military of the United Arab Emirates. The vehicle managed to drive in the desert at maximum speed for one hour nonstop, without any malfunctions.

In August 2017, a K9 operated by the 5th Artillery Brigade of the Republic of Korea Army was set ablaze during a firing exercise, causing 3 deaths and 4 wounds among crew members and instructors. After the investigation, it was found that a faulty spring caused the hammer to detonate prematurely, pushing the explosion into the vehicle before the breech was fully closed, and ignited the additional charges which had been taken out from the rack for the next firing. The entire K9 fleet operated by South Korea underwent inspection during the investigation. The Republic of Korea Armed Forces responded by installing black boxes and an AFSS (automatic fire suppression system), reinforcing maintenance, and providing flame-resistance uniforms to crew members.

The production and the delivery of the K9 Thunder ended in June 2018. The factory will continue to produce the model as the K9A1 variant. The first new variant was fielded by the 5th Artillery Brigade of the Republic of Korea Army in August 2018.

=== 2020s ===
On 13 November 2020, the DAPA announced that the entire K9 program delivered to the Republic of Korea Armed Forces is now at full operational capability, bringing the K9 Thunder program for the South Korean military to completion.

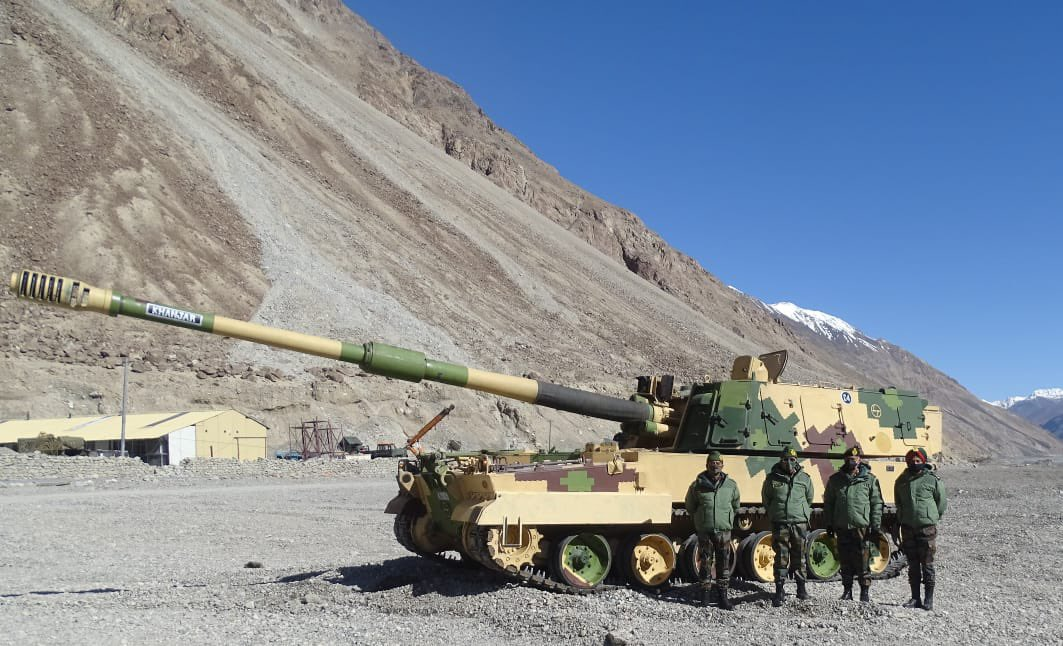
Indian Army K9 Vajra-T deployed on Ladakh plateau during China–India skirmishes

In February 2021, the K9 Vajra-T was deployed to the Ladakh region during territorial tensions between China and India.

In December 2024, the Norwegian military experienced a shortage of the K9 VIDAR spare parts due to the discrepancy between expected versus actual consumption of parts. To prioritize maintaining the howitzers in operational status, the military responded by temporarily removing the K10s, which share many components with the howitzer, from active service for cannibalization. The K10s will return to active service once the military receives the next shipment from South Korea in February 2025.

On 28 January 2025, the Syrian Democratic Forces released a video of FPV drone attacks on two Turkish T-155s located in Manbij. The first attack set a howitzer on fire, but the video itself proves that the fire was put out, and the gun appears to be fine during the second drone attack, which the video does not show results.

== Exports ==
=== Turkey ===
T-155 Firtina
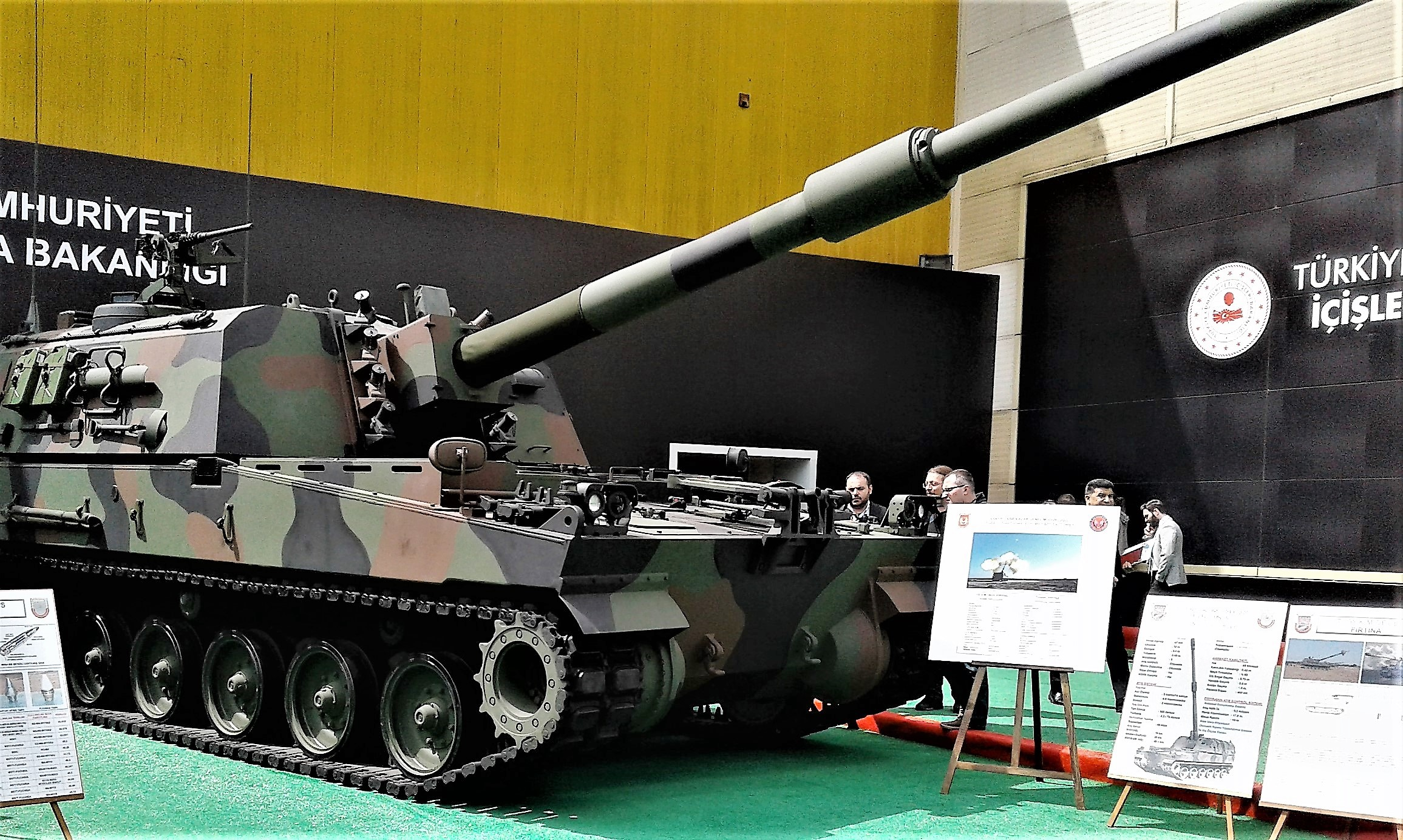
- Turkish variant T-155 Firtina
- Place of origin: South Korea; Turkey

Service history
- In service: Firtina I: 2005–present Firtina II: 2021–present
- Wars: Kurdish–Turkish conflict; Operation Sun; Syrian civil war; Syrian–Turkish clashes; Operation Euphrates Shield; Operation Olive Branch; Operation Peace Spring; Second Libyan Civil War; Operation Peace Storm

Production history
- Designer: Samsung Techwin; Turkish Land Forces
- Designed: 2000–2004
- Manufacturer: Turkish Land Forces (2004–2015); Mechanical and Chemical Industry Corporation (2015–present); BMC Defence (2019–present)
- Produced: Firtina I: 2004–2014; Firtina II: 2018–present

Specifications
- Maximum firing range: 39 km (MOD 274, BB/HE)
- Main armament: MKE/Hyundai WIA 155 mm 52 caliber, 48 rounds
- Transmission: HST Otomotiv/Allison Transmission X1100-5A4; 4 forward, 2 reverse (after 2024)

In May 1999, the Ministry of National Defense of South Korea ordered its military attaché in Turkey to arrange a presentation for K9 Thunder. On 29 April, Samsung dispatched its sales team, and had a meeting with high-ranking Turkish officials including assistant secretary of defense and director of technology. Despite showing interest in K9 Thunder, there was no business deals made as Turkey was planning to produce German Panzerhaubitze 2000 at that time. Another meeting was held on 4 October between Atilla Ateş, commander of the Turkish Land Forces, and military attaché Colonel Go regarding K9 production in Turkey and solution for import restriction on MTU Friedrichshafen engines by German government. As Turkey's plan to build PzH2000 eventually became halted by Germany, South Korea and Turkey signed MOU to strengthen military and defense cooperation on 18 November.

On 12 December, Turkey sent a team of military general and engineers to Korea to inspect K9 Thunder. Satisfied with the performance, Turkey cancelled its plan to find replacement from Israel, and decided to manufacture K9 Thunder. On 19 February 2000, a technology evaluation team consisting members of the Agency of Defense Development and Samsung was sent to Turkey, and inspected various Turkish companies and facilities including Turkish 1010th Army Factory, MKEK, and Aselsan to optimize manufacturing process of K9 in Turkey. On 4 May 2000, the Ministry of National Defense of the Republic of Korea and Turkish Land Forces Command signed a memorandum of understanding (MOU) to supply 350 K9 systems till 2011.

On the same day the MOU was signed, Germany informed South Korea that Germany would not allow sales of license produced MTU engines to Turkey due to its political reasons, thus possibly cancelling the project. To solve the issue, Korea prepared for British Perkins Engines, which had already been examined for K9 during the early designing phase, and negotiated with Germany in the meantime. On 29 May 2000 during ministerial talks, South Korea asked Germany to permit sales of MTU engines, or it may experience hardship in purchasing German equipment for its future needs.

On 20 June, Turkey transferred $3.35 million to build a prototype, and engineers were sent to Samsung Techwin for technical training. Between July and August, parts for the prototype were built and sent to Turkey, and the engineers returned and assembled the vehicle with assistance from Korean counterparts. On 15 December, Germany approved Korea in exporting maximum of 400 engines to Turkey after reaching an agreement with license producing German Type 214 submarine as a winner of the KSS-II program for the Republic of Korea Navy. The prototype was finally equipped with engine, ending the assembly on 30 December 2000, and earned the nickname Firtina (Fırtına; Storm).

Winter test was held in January and February 2001 at Sarıkamış, and Firtina was able to operate in snowy mountain terrain without issue. It also went thru firing test in 10 to 23 of March at Karapinar, and summer test at Diyarbakır between April and May. On 12 May, Firtina took a major part of firepower demonstration, showing its capabilities live on-air as it was needed for military to earn support from people and politicians to manufacture Firtina amid economic crisis.

A formal contract was signed by Samsung Techwin (formerly Samsung Aerospace Industries) and the Embassy of the Republic of Turkey in Seoul on 20 July 2001. South Korean government will transfer the technologies belong to the Agency for Defense Development that are used for Turkish variant for free in exchange for Turkey to purchase 350 vehicles—280 for Turkish Land Forces and 70 for its future customer—by 2011, which the total is expected to be $1 billion. The first 24 T-155 consists $65 million worth of Korean subsystems. The Turkish model was named T-155 Firtina.

Hanwha Defense has generated more than $600 million from Turkey since then, much lower than expected, as Turkey produced fewer units than planned as well as its effort to increase localization gradually by indigenous research and from technology transfer. A total of 281 vehicles were produced by the 1st Main Maintenance Factory Directorate of the Turkish Land Forces between 2004 and 2014, and deliveries were completed in 2015.

In 2024, Allison Transmission delivered ten X1100-5A4 transmissions to Turkey as a part of Firtina II program for the integration. On 10 February 2025, Allison Transmission announced that HST Otomotiv will produce 32 additional transmissions under license and deliver starting in Q1 of 2026. The transmission can support heavy vehicles up to 57 metric tons (63 tons).

=== Poland ===
==== PK9 ====
PK9
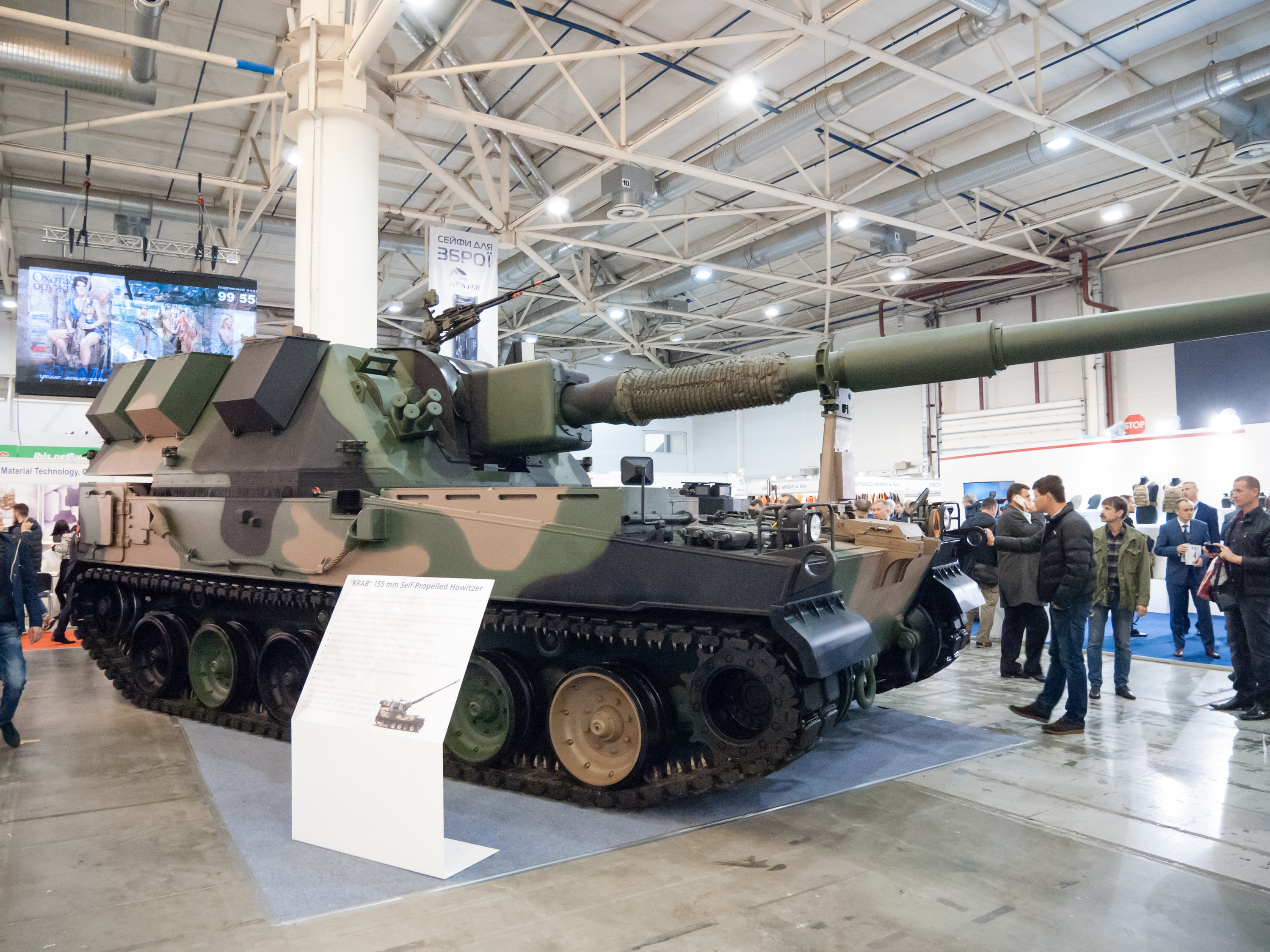
- AHS Krab with PK9 chassis at the Arms and Security 2017 exhibition
- Place of origin: South Korea; Poland

Service history
- In service: 2016–present
- Wars: Russo-Ukrainian War

Production history
- Designer: Samsung Techwin; Hanwha Techwin; Huta Stalowa Wola
- Designed: 2014–2016
- Manufacturer: Samsung Techwin (2014–2015); Hanwha Techwin (2015–2016); Huta Stalowa Wola (2017–present)

Specifications
- Maximum speed: 60 km/h (37 mph) on road 30 km/h (19 mph) off-road

In 1999, the same year Poland joined NATO, it launched a military program named Regina Project to replace its 152mm Soviet-era SPGs with the NATO standard 155 mm artillery system. The British BAE Systems was chosen by Poland for technical cooperation to build a new design. Later, the plan was changed to use modified AS-90 turret and combine with UPG-NG chassis from domestic company Bumar-Łabędy to shorten the development schedule.

However, the UPG-NG chassis experienced series of issues during trial. The chassis was unable to support its 20 t turret by failing the shock absorption from 155 mm 52 caliber weapon system, often breaking and cracking the parts. In addition, the factory that has been producing S-12U engine for the vehicle was closed down, causing major discrepancy in logistics even before the mass production stage. In 2008, after four years since the prototype was revealed, Polish Ministry of Defense warned Bumar to fix the issue by 2014, otherwise it will look for foreign partner instead. Bumar failed to meet the ROC (required operational capability), thus K9 Thunder platform was chosen for the weapon project.

In December 2014, Samsung Techwin signed a cooperation agreement with Huta Stalowa Wola to supply modified K9 Thunder chassis for AHS Krab self-propelled howitzer. The changes to the chassis (referred to as PK9) include a fire suppression system in the crew compartment, air filtration system, air conditioning and the APU. The deal is worth $310 million for 120 chassis, which includes related technology transfer and the power pack. From 2015 to 2022, 24 units will be manufactured in South Korea, and 96 will be license produced in Poland. First chassis rolled out on 26 June 2015, and all 24 vehicles produced in Korea left for Poland as of October 2016. HSW will begin producing PK9 chassis starting in 2017.

On 16 December 2020, 2 guns were added for training school as part of 2016 contract adjustment.

Late in May 2022, the Polish government donated 18 AHS Krab howitzers to Ukraine to assist the Ukrainian military to defend against Russia during the invasion of Ukraine. On 29 May, Polish minister of defense visited South Korea for high level talks regarding the purchase of various Korean weapons including additional K9 chassis to increase AHS Krab production. On June 7, Poland and Ukraine signed a contract for the purchase of an additional 54 units plus support vehicles, in a deal worth US$700 million. The agreement was the largest defense contract that Polish defense industry had made.

On 5 September 2022, Poland ordered 48 Krabs and other support vehicles for a value of PLN 3.8 billion zlotys (USD $797 million).

On 23 December 2024, the contract worth PLN 9 billion for 96 Krabs, command vehicles, command and staff vehicles, ammunition vehicles, and repair workshops was signed. The delivery schedule for this batch is scheduled by the end of 2029.

On 8 April 2025, HSW signed a ₩402.6 billion deal with Hanwha Aerospace to supply parts including power packs for 87 AHS Krabs between 2026 and 2028.

==== K9PL ====
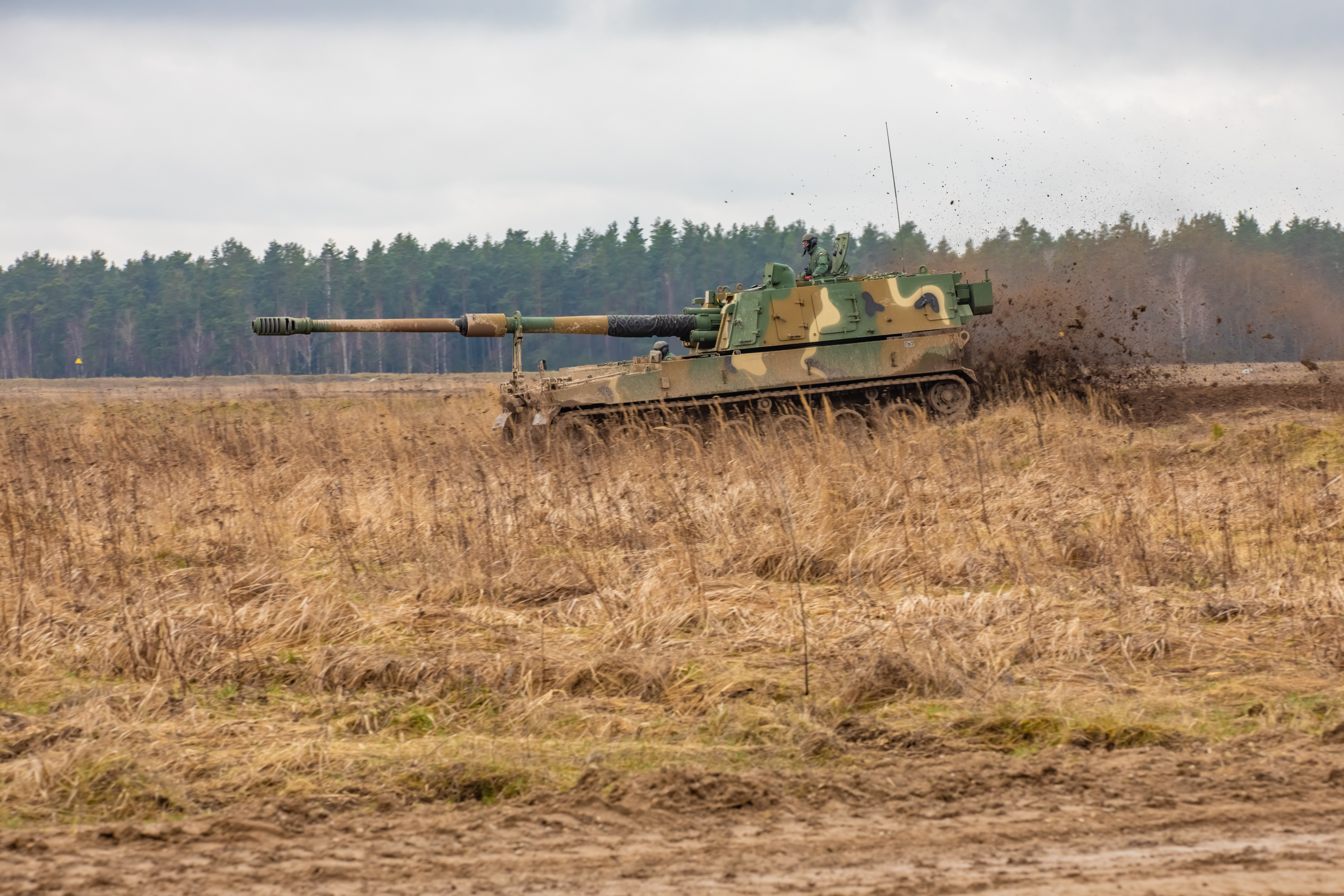
Polish K9 Thunder maneuvers on the firing range for a live fire demonstration in Bemowo Piskie, Poland on March 31, 2023

On 27 July 2022, Polish Armaments Group (PGZ) and Hanwha Defense signed a framework agreement to supply 672 K9PL. Hanwha Defense hoped to expand the deal plus adding K10 ARV and K11 FDCV support vehicles. Poland will also produce AHS Krab in parallel; however, due to the low production capability, the deliveries of the existing order will be completed by 2026. On 26 August 2022, an executive contract of $2.4 billion was signed to acquire 212 K9PL manufactured by Hanwha Defense as a Batch I order. Poland took loans equivalent to 70% of the total purchase cost (which includes Polish orders for the K2 Black Panther, K9 Thunder, as well as the FA-50), from the South Korean banks. The deal does not include accompanying vehicles; however, it consists of crew training, including simulators, logistics packages, and a large amount of ammunition. To fill up Polish inventory quickly, the first 48 howitzers (upgraded K9 to A1) will come from the Republic of Korea Army inventory, and the ROKA will be compensated with newly produced vehicles later. These secondhand vehicles are sometimes referred to as K9GF (Gap Filler). All K9PL, including K9GF, will be equipped with the Polish C2 network system and Topaz Automated Fire Control System, which is intended for operating with Polish command vehicles. Under the contract, Hanwha is responsible for delivery of all 212 vehicles by 30 September 2026. Poland plans to build K9PL locally afterward via technology transfer for the Batch II. On 7 September, Hanwha Defense and WB Electronics signed a $139.5 million deal for installation of Polish communication systems on the Batch I order.

The first 24 K9PL(GF) was rolled out on 19 October 2022. The delivery ceremony was held in Poland on 6 December. The first new K9PL began its construction in July 2023.

On 1 December 2023, Poland and Hanwha Aerospace signed a $2.6 billion agreement for 6 Batch I K9PLs by 2025, 146 Batch II K9PLs between 2026 and 2027, and integrated logistics support for the howitzers and 155 mm ammunitions. This agreement did not involve loan like previous, and the deal includes technology transfers that allow Poland to manufacture 155 mm ammunitions and K9 parts locally. On the same day, a framework agreement for auxiliary vehicles for Krab and K9 howitzers was signed between the Polish MoD and PGZ, which means that Polish K9PL will be accompanied by domestic vehicles instead of the K10 or the K11.

The K9PL Batch II was initially described as "using solutions from the K9A2"; however, the final configuration from the December executive contract was the K9A1 with modifications. The Batch II has 13 additional subsystems compared to the first, such as the Obra-3 laser warning system, automatic fire suppression system in the crew compartment, air filtration system, air conditioning, smoke grenade launcher, and the APU in the chassis instead of in the turret.

On 16 March 2024, Korean banks authorized a maximum of $8.5 billion loan for Poland to purchase additional South Korean arms.

On 4 April 2024, Hanwha Aerospace opened a European office in Warsaw and announced the integration of the K9 and Krab howitzer systems with cooperation from HSW to improve the operational and maintenance efficiency of the Polish military. The two systems are simple to integrate since both use the same chassis. Hanwha Aerospace also plans to establish a MCS propellant production plant in Poland to support the entire 155 mm artillery system. On 10 May 2024, two companies signed the letter of intent for the integration, which also includes adopting licensed PK9 chassis for the K9A2 and K9A3 and transferring technology for repairing the CN98 main gun.

On 23 December 2024, PGZ, HSW, and Rosomak SA were awarded PLN 8 billion for delivering more than 250 accompanying vehicles, including training and logistics package, for the K9 howitzers.

=== Finland ===
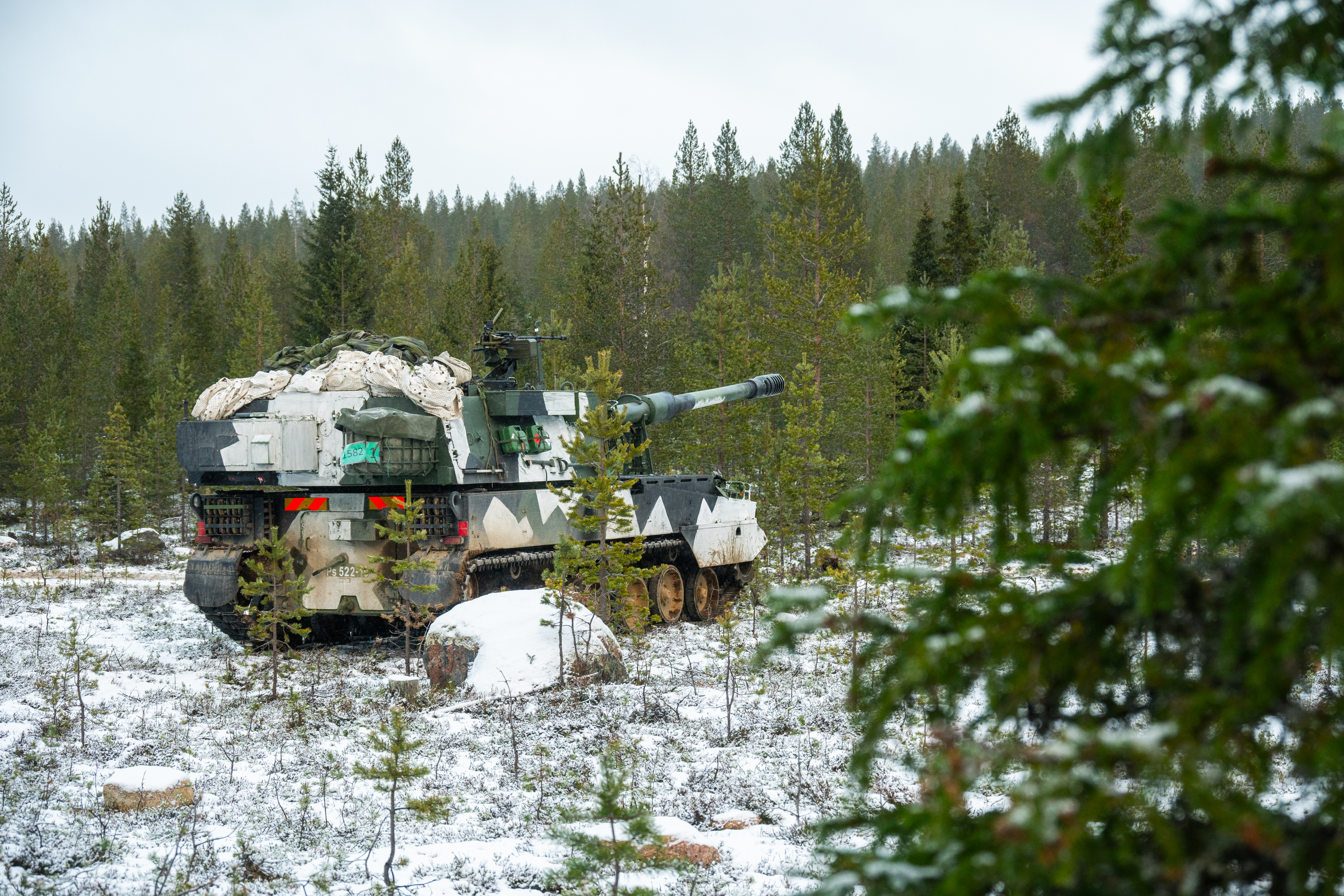
Finnish Army K9FIN Moukari prepares to fire during exercise at Rovajärvi artillery range

On 1 June 2016 at KDEC (Korea Defense Equipment & Component) industry fair, two nations signed a MOU for defense cooperation including export of used K9. In July 2016, the Finnish Ministry of Defence announced that an undisclosed number of used K9s have been selected to be acquired from the Republic of Korea. The acquisition is claimed to be biggest of the decade for the Land Forces, whose both mobile and towed artillery face mass outdating in the 2020s. In September 2016, K9 was field tested in Finland, and Seppo Toivonen, the commander of the Finnish Army, visited South Korea to inspect operating units during 2016 DX Korea. On 25 November 2016, two countries signed MOU to supply 48 used K9 for $200 million and match equal amount of free technology transfer related to vehicle maintenance.

On 17 February 2017, the Ministry of Defense announced that Finland will acquire 48 used K9s over a period of seven years starting in 2018, with conscript training on the equipment commencing in 2019. On 2 March 2017, final contract of value of €145 million ($160 million) was signed by two governments in Seoul, South Korea.

On 21 October 2021, Finnish Ministry of Defense authorized exercising option to purchase 10 new vehicles including spare parts and supplies—5 in 2021 and another 5 in 2022—for €30 million, increasing the fleet size to 58 vehicles.

On 18 November 2022 Finnish Minister of Defence Antti Kaikkonen authorized purchase of another 38 used vehicles for €134 million.

The official Finnish designation of the howitzer is 155 PSH K9 FIN, colloquially called Moukari (meaning Sledgehammer). Vehicles receive domestic modification via Millog.

On 4 March 2024, Millog signed a contract with the Finnish Defense Force to upgrade 48 vehicles purchased in 2021 and 2022 at €8.1 million. The work is expected to be completed by 2030.

=== India ===
K9 Vajra-T
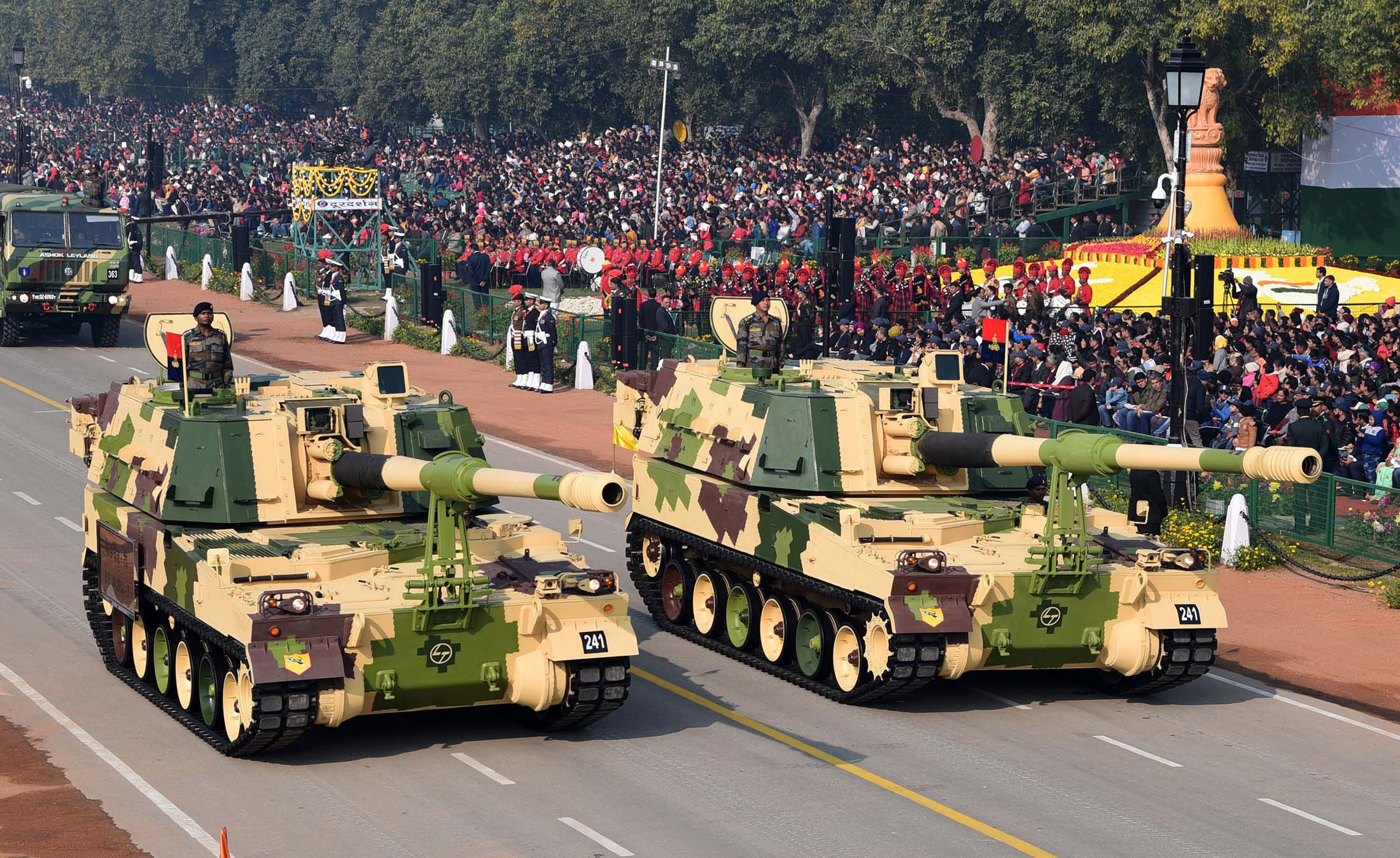
- K9 Vajra-T passes through the Rajpath, at the 71st Republic Day Parade, at Rajpath, in New Delhi on January 26, 2020
- Place of origin: South Korea; India

Service history
- In service: 2018–present

Production history
- Designer: Samsung Techwin; Hanwha Techwin; Larsen & Toubro
- Designed: 2012–2017
- Manufacturer: Hanwha Techwin (2017); Hanwha Land Systems (2017–2018); Larsen & Toubro (2018–present)
- Produced: 2017–present

Specifications
- Maximum firing range: 38 km (Standard); 62 km (Ramjet Shell)
- Sights: Safran MINEO DFSS
- Secondary armament: 7.62 mm machine gun
- Transmission: Allison Transmission India X1100-5A3; 4 forward, 2 reverse

On 25 March 2012, South Korean president Lee Myung-bak and the Indian Prime Minister, Manmohan Singh signed Memorandum of Understanding (MoU) to strengthen the economy and military exchanges. On 29 March 2012 at DEFEXPO, Samsung Techwin and Larsen & Toubro announced their partnership to produce the K9 Thunder in India. As per the agreement, Samsung Techwin will transfer key technologies, and the vehicle will be manufactured under license in India using 50 per cent of the domestic content such as FCS and communication system.

Two units of K9 were sent to Thar Desert, Rajasthan for firing and mobility test, and competed against Russian 2S19. Operated by Indian military personnel, the K9 fired 587 Indian ammunitions including Nub round and drove a total distance of 1,000 km. Maintenance test was conducted at Pune, EMI (electromagnetic interference) test at Chennai, and technical environment test was held in Bengaluru until March 2014. K9 Thunder achieved all ROC set by Indian military while the Russian counterpart failed to do so. Hanwha Techwin (previously Samsung Techwin) later told in an interview that the Russian engine performance dropped when the air density is low and in high temperature, the placement of the engine also resulted in the center of the mass located at the rear, making the vehicle difficult to climb high angles. On the other hand, K9 benefitted from automatic control system of the engine, providing the optimum performance based on given condition automatically—this was one of the decisive reason why India selected K9 over 2S19.

In September 2015, the Indian Ministry of Defense (MoD) selected Hanwha Techwin and Larsen & Toubro as preferred bidder to supply 100 K9 Vajra-T to the Indian Army after K9 outperformed 2S19 Msta-S and passed two-year trial. On 6 July 2016, India agreed in purchasing 100 K9 Vajra-T for $750 million. On 29 March 2017, the Government of India approved budget of $646 million for purchasing 100 K9 Vajra-T. A formal contract of $310 million was signed between Hanwha Techwin and Larsen & Toubro in New Delhi on 21 April. Hanwha Techwin will supply first 10 K9 Vajra-T, and 90 will be license produced in India by Larsen & Toubro.

K9 Vajra-T consist 14 major Indian manufactured systems, 50% of component by value, which include Nub ammunition capable FCS and its storage, communication system, and environment control and NBC protection system. Additional systems were installed such as GPS (Gunner's Primary Sight) for direct firing capability, and South African APU, which was proven for desert operation—Korean APU was under development phase during Indian trial. The vehicle's overall design was modified to suitable for operation in desert and high temperature condition, including the change of firing rate to 3 rounds in 30 seconds.

In February 2020, media reported that IIT Madras along with IIT Kanpur, Armament Research and Development Establishment (ARDE) and Research Centre Imarat (RCI) are working on redesigning an existing 155 mm shell using ramjet propulsion that can cover 60 km+ range. It will be compatible with K9 Vajra-T. The shell will use precision guidance kit for trajectory correction. IIT Madras is ensuring that Munitions India can manufacture the shells.

The 100th vehicle was delivered to the Indian Army on 18 February 2021, completing the contract ahead the schedule. The vehicles are being produced in L&T's facility in Armoured Systems Complex, Hazira.

In May 2021, it was reported that India's Defence Research and Development Organisation is working with Larsen & Toubro on a light tank using the K9 chassis with 105 mm or 120 mm gun system to counter China's Type 15 tank. The light tank variant was opted out as the estimated vehicle weight exceeded 30 tonne, limiting the places to operate.

The Indian Army planned ordering an additional 40 K-9 Vajra-T from Larsen & Toubro as of 2021 after completion of high altitude trials at Ladakh under cold climatic conditions. India is also looking to export the K9 Vajra-T variant to third countries in collaboration with South Korea and industry partners. As per a report in 2022, the MoD could place a repeat order of 200 K9 Vajra-T worth ₹9,600 crore (equivalent to ₹110 billion or US$1.2 billion in 2026) after satisfactory performance of the guns at high altitude terrain. The Batch II is to be equipped with enhanced engine suited for high altitude operation, and is expected to complete delivery by 2028.

The Acceptance of Necessity (AoN) for first 100 units was cleared by 27 September 2022 by the Defence Acquisition Council (DAC). This will be followed by issuing request for proposal (RFP) to L&T and cost negotiations. As of February 2023, Hanwha was under a discussion for an order of 100 additional units. According to a report in May 2024, the clearance for next 100 units would be approved after the formation of a new government after 2024 Indian general election. The Cabinet Committee on Security cleared the purchase of 100 units on 12 December 2024. The contract, worth ₹7,628.70 crore (equivalent to ₹81 billion or US$840 million in 2026), was signed with Larsen & Toubro on 20 December 2024 in the South Block, New Delhi. The entire order is to be processed and delivered by the end of 2025. On 3 April 2025, L&T signed another contract with Hanwha Aerospace at $253 million to execute the order. The indigenous content of the system is expected to be over 60% for the order.

On 10 June 2026, India Today reported that the Indian Army is planning to acquire another tranche of over 300 Vajra howitzers at a cost of around ₹23,000 crore (US$2.4 billion). The proposal is expected to be discussed at the meeting of the Defence Procurement Board (DPB), chaired by the Defence Secretary, during the second week of the month. The Defence Acquisition Council (DAC) approved the procurement of Self-Propelled Tracked Gun System for the Indian Army on 26 October 2026. The procurement includes 335 units along with large number of winter kits with over 70% indigenous content.

The development of 155 mm Smart Ammunition for the Regiment of Artillery by Munitions India and IIT Madras was reported in February 2024. The period of development is roughly two years. The goal is to improve the accuracy and lethality of artillery shells during terminal impact. The smart shell can be launched from 155 mm 39- and 45-calibre guns, including Dhanush, ATAGS, and K9 Vajra-T. It will achieve a circular error probable (CEP) of 10 m (33 ft) against 500 m (1,600 ft) CEP for conventional shells. It requires housing of miniaturize electronics and sensors package with a guidance, navigation, and control system. To improve accuracy, the smart artillery round will use NavIC, with a GPS backup. It will be interoperable with all of the Indian Army's artillery guns to accommodate various tactical requirements. The smart shell will incorporate three-mode fuse operation, fin stabilization, and canard control. A minimum range of 8 km (5.0 mi) and a maximum range of 38 km (24 mi) are anticipated. The smart shell will have three explosion modes: delayed, height of burst, and point detonation.

=== Norway ===
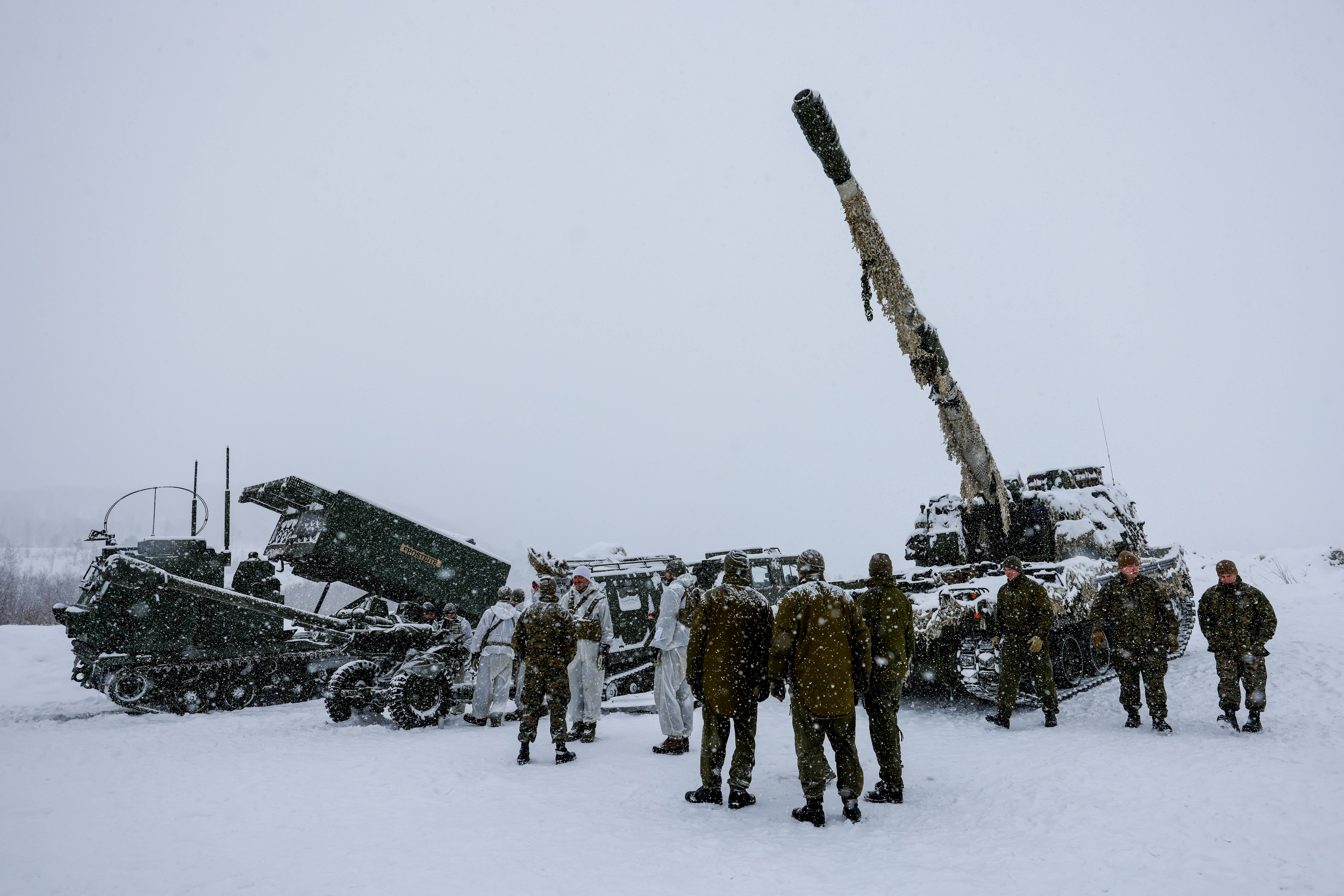
Norwegian Army K9 VIDAR on display at the Setermoen Training Area in Norway on March 14, 2025.

In May 2015, Samsung Techwin joined the Norwegian artillery upgrade program, competing against the KMW Panzerhaubitze 2000, the Nexter CAESAR 6x6, and the RUAG M109 KAWEST to replace Norway's M109Gs with 24 new systems. A single K9 was sent to Norway to join the competition. Operated by a sales team, the vehicle went through tests between November 2015 and January 2016. During the January winter test, the K9 was the only vehicle that managed to drive through meter-thick snow field and fire its weapon without any issue. Competing vehicles experienced engine troubles or broken parts.

The K9's engine was able to maintain heat overnight by simply covering the area with tarpaulin, a simple trick learned from operating experience, allowing the engine to ignite without failure the next day at an extremely cold temperature. The hydropneumatic suspension became a huge advantage for mobility, as its mechanism melted snow on mobility parts much quicker. The test result also impacted Finland and Estonia, who were invited to observe performances for their artillery replacement, to acquire the K9.

In August 2016, the Norwegian Defence Materiel Agency published their intention to continue negotiations with Hanwha Techwin and RUAG, while Krauss-Maffei Wegmann and Nexter Systems had been put "on hold". Unnamed sources in the Norwegian Army had previously stated that the K9 was a leading candidate in the competition.

In December 2017, a contract of $230 million was signed between Hanwha Land Systems and the Norwegian Ministry of Defense, for supplying 24 K9 Thunder and 6 K10 ARV by 2020. The K9 outperformed competitors in various weather and terrain conditions according to Norwegian military officials during trials.

The Norwegian variant was named K9 VIDAR (versatile indirect artillery system), and is based on the K9A1 configuration. It differs from the K9A1 by changing the BTCS to a Norwegian ODIN fire support system and radio communication systems for NATO operation. It mounts the gunner's sight for direct firing, and installed spall liner for additional protection. Norwegian company Kongsberg participated in upgrading the K9 for Norway, Finland, and Estonia. The company will partner with Hanwha Defense again for Australia's AS9 program.

In November 2022, Norway used an option signed in 2017, to purchase 4 K9s and 8 K10s, increasing its total vehicles to 28 K9s and 14 K10s (2:1 ratio). The delivery is expected to be completed in 2 years.

In April 2025, it was announced that Norway plans to almost double its K9s by ordering an additional 24 K9s for about $534 million USD. The contract for the third batch was signed on 19 September 2025.

=== Estonia ===
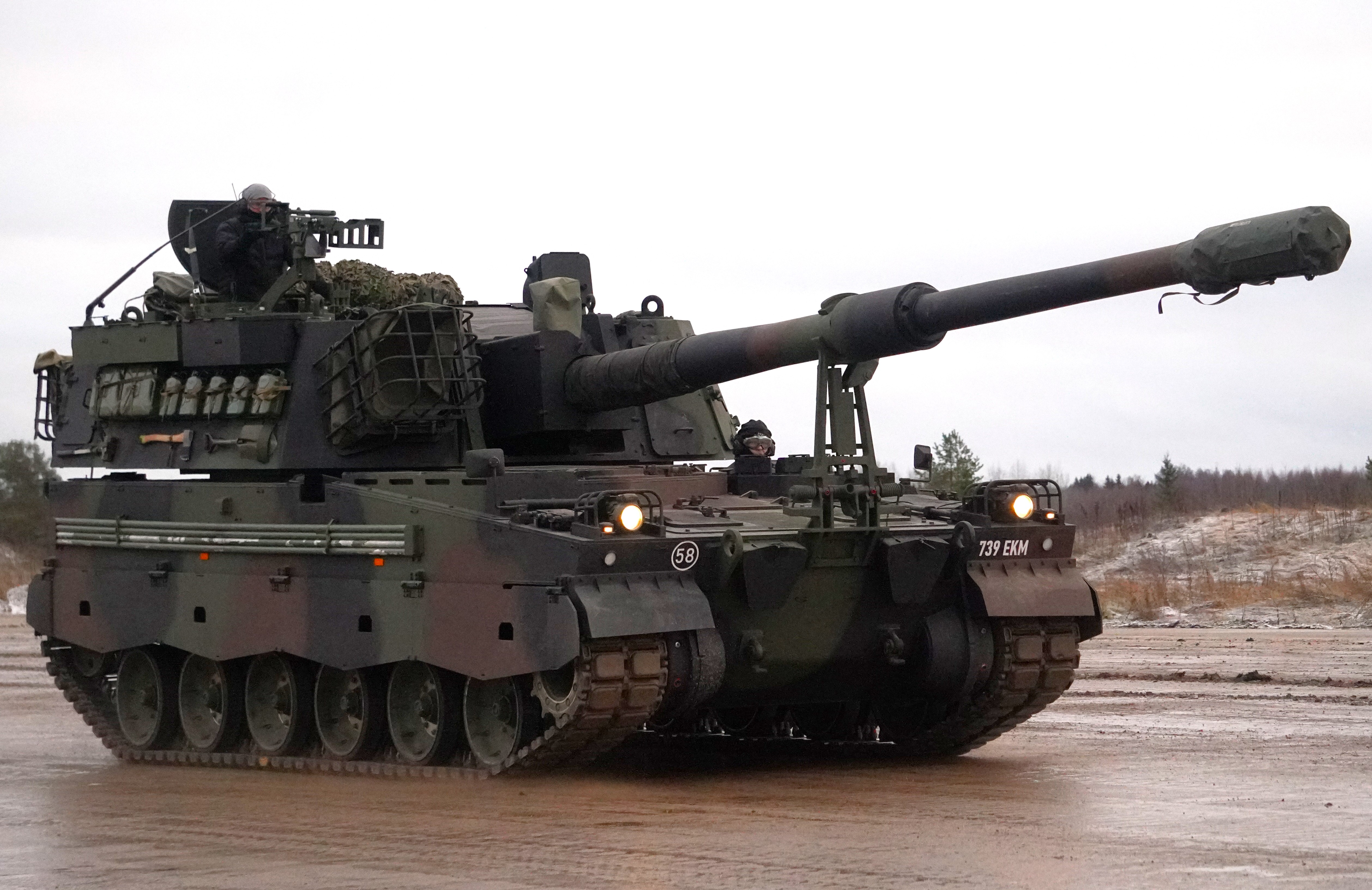
K9EST Kõu during maneuver training.

To reduce the cost per unit for both nations, Finland invited Estonia to jointly procure the K9. Under this arrangement, Finland provided test data on the K9 to Estonia, with approval from South Korea. In February 2017, Estonian military officials visited South Korea for price negotiations.

In June 2018, Rauno Sirk, the director of the Estonian military procurement agency, announced that Estonia would buy K9 Thunder howitzers. Hanwha Land Systems was to supply 12 used K9s for €46 million, which would cover maintenance, parts and training, as in the contract with Finland. In October 2019, the Estonian Ministry of Defense announced that it would exercise the option to purchase 6 additional K9s under the terms of this contract, at an estimated cost of €20 million.

In August 2021, the Estonian Centre for Defense Investment (RKIK) signed a €4.6 million contract with Hanwha Defense and Go Craft to modernize 24 K9EST Kõu, hinting at purchasing 6 more for its inventory. The upgrade involves communication systems, a FCS, painting, fire suppression system, and electronics.

In September 2022, it was reported that Estonia had purchased 24 vehicles in total. In October, the Estonian defense minister stated that Estonia would procure 12 additional K9s, bringing the total number up to 36 units. In November 2022, Go Craft opened Estonia's first private military workshop, and will start upgrading K9s. In January 2023, Estonia ordered 12 vehicles for €36 million, which will be delivered before 2026. The first Estonian edition by Go Craft was rolled out in February 2023.

=== Australia ===
AS9 Huntsman
- Place of origin: South Korea; Australia

Service history
- In service: 2025–present

Production history
- Designer: Samsung Techwin; Hanwha Defense; Hanwha Aerospace
- Designed: 2010–2012; 2020–2024
- Manufacturer: Hanwha Aerospace (2023–2024); Hanwha Defence Australia (2024–present)
- Produced: 2023–present

Specifications
- Mass: 52 t (51 long tons; 57 short tons), combat
- Length: Overall: 12.4 m (40 ft 8 in)
- Maximum firing range: 40 km (M982, guided)
- Sights: Safran MINEO DFSS
- Armor: Bisalloy armour steel Spall liner Plasan add-on armor
- Secondary armament: Pintle Mount 5.56 mm or 7.62 mm RWS 5.56 mm, 7.62 mm, 12.7 mm, or 40 mm
- Maximum speed: 60 km/h (37 mph)

In June 2005 in Australia, the defense ministers of the two nations held a meeting and discussed trading opportunities involving K9 Thunder and Australian 5-inch naval gun ammunition. In August 2009, it was reported that the consortium of Samsung Techwin and Raytheon Australia had the upper hand for Australia's Land 17 artillery replacement program by becoming a sole bidder, as KMW, the manufacturer of the competing Panzerhaubitze 2000, had not provided the detailed offering proposal that Australia requested.

The K9 was sent to Australia, and was evaluated by the Australian military starting in April 2010. The test included firing M982 Excalibur, a requirement which the K9 satisfied. The Australian variant AS9 was expected to feature a NATO standard fire-control system, the BMS-F (Battlefield Management System – Fires), the RWS (Remote Weapon System), and anti-tank mine protection. The hydropneumatic suspension was enhanced to support its increased weight.

In June 2010, the K9 became the preferred bidder for the LAND 17 program. The project budget was redirected for restoration due to the floods in Queensland in 2011, which led to the cancelation of the project in May 2012. In May 2019, in the lead-up to the 2019 Federal Election, the Prime Minister of Australia, Scott Morrison, announced that 30 K9 howitzers and associated support equipment, including ten K10 ammunition resupply vehicles, would be acquired for the ADF. No time frame was given for the purchase.

In September 2020, the Minister for Defense, Linda Reynolds, announced a request for tender to locally build 30 K9s under the Land 8116 Phase 1 Protected Mobility Fires requirement. The sole-source request for tender will be released to the preferred supplier, Hanwha Defense Australia, to build and maintain 30 K9s and 15 K10s, as well as their supporting systems. These will be built at Hanwha Defense Australia's Geelong facility. Australian variant AS9 Huntsman is based on Norwegian K9 VIDAR. It will retain the options offered in 2010 with up-to-date modifications.

In December 2021, the Capability Acquisition and Sustainment Group (CASG) of Australia and Hanwha Defense Australia signed a formal contract of producing 30 AS9s and 15 AS10 AARVs under license at Hanwha Defense Australia facility in Geelong, Victoria; the facility, which is included in the contract, will begin its construction in Q2 2022. The CASG and the DAPA also signed an MOU for defense cooperation between the two countries. The estimated value of the deal is $788 million, and manufacturing is expected to start in Q4 2024.

In February 2022, Hanwha Defense Australia made a selection of site of 150,000 m^{2}, which includes 32,000 m^{2} manufacturing facility, 1.5 km long track, and various test and R&D sites, for its first overseas factory named H-ACE (Hanwha Armoured Vehicle Centre of Excellence) at Geelong, which will create 300 jobs for local specialists. Construction began on 8 April, and is expected to take 2 years to complete.

In March 2022, Hanwha Defense signed a $67 million deal with Norwegian firm Kongsberg Gruppen for the installation of C4 for Australian vehicles. Kongsberg is expected to supply Integrated Combat Solution (ICS) as well as ODIN fire support systems via Kongsberg Australia. On 19 July, Hanwha Systems signed a contract with Hanwha Defense Australia to supply HUMS (Health and Usage Monitoring System) and Situational Awareness System (SAS) for AS9s and AS10s at a cost of 20.8 billion KRW.

In October 2022, Hanwha signed a $5 million deal with Safran to supply 32 MINEO DFSS for direct firing capability. In January 2023, Hanwha signed a $3.5 million contract with a German company AirSense Analytics to supply CBRN system for the vehicles.

In April 2023, Australia withdrew from Land 8116 Phase 2, a repeating order equal to Phase 1 in volume, as the new government decided to focus on M142 HIMARS, air, and naval assets.

In May 2023, Israeli firm Plasan completed the protection test for the program.

Production of AS9 and AS10 began in June 2023. In July, Australian army conducted tests on ammunition compatibility at the Agency for Defense Development test center in South Korea. In August, another Israeli company Epsilor was selected to supply NATO standard 6T Li-ion batteries for the howitzer.

On 28 March 2024, Hanwha Aerospace announced the beginning of assembly of two AS9s and one AS10 in Changwon. The remaining 28 AS9s and 14 AS10s will be built at H-ACE in Australia.

On 23 August 2024, Hanwha Aerospace invited Korean and Australian government officials for an opening ceremony of H-ACE. The factory will start mass production of AS9 and AS10 in that year and deliver all vehicles to the Australian Army by 2027.

In December 2024, Hanwha Aerospace delivered two AS9 and one AS10 to Hanwha Defence Australia, and the Australian military received them in January 2025.

=== Egypt ===
In 2010, the K9 was evaluated by the Egyptian military to replace its aging artillery fleet. The deal was delayed when the Egyptian government requested a reduction on technology transfer fees, which would have required the South Korean government's approval. The negotiations ended as regional instability due to the Arab Spring caused the Egyptian government to postpone the project indefinitely.

In April 2017, it was reported that Hanwha Techwin was again in negotiations with Egypt to export the K9 Thunder. A K9 howitzer was sent to Egypt in July and was test-fired at a range located west of Cairo in August, along with competitors such as the French CAESAR, Russian 2S35 Koalitsiya-SV, and Chinese PLZ-45. During the test, the K9 hit a target ship approaching to the shore, successfully performing an anti-access/area denial simulation against enemy ships for the Egyptian Navy.

In October 2021, the two nations discussed the sale of the K9 Thunder. The estimated value of the deal was $2 billion, including training of technicians. In the same month, the Egyptian minister of military production visited Hanwha Defense and Hyundai WIA facility to see the manufacturing process of the K9 Thunder and K2 Black Panther respectively. The two parties, including Egyptian president Abdel Fattah el-Sisi, met again at the EDEX 2021 exposition to discuss the export of the howitzer. Egypt was reportedly looking to produce the howitzer under license.

In February 2022, South Korea's Defense Acquisition Program Administration (DAPA) announced that Hanwha Defense had signed a $1.6 billion K9 Thunder export contract at Egypt's Artillery House, attended by Egypt's Ministry of National Defense and key officials from both countries. Egypt also signed a loan contract with South Korea. According to DAPA, the deal provided for the production of 200 K9A1EGY and 100 K10EGY in Egypt, including technology transfer. An unknown number of the earliest vehicles in the series were to be produced in South Korea and delivered to the Egyptian Army and the Egyptian Navy. On 25 February, two more contracts involving parts purchase and assembly were signed at the Military Factory 200, a state-owned Egyptian arms manufacturer.

The production of the first K9A1EGY was expected in Q4 2022, with armor steel provided by Bisalloy Steels. The first batch was to be delivered to Egypt until 2024, while the rest will be produced in Egypt with a localization rate of 50%. Egypt is expecting to increase localization to 67% in five years. On 22 October 2022, Hanwha Defense signed a contract with Arab International Optronics to transfer automatic fire control system (AFCS) and other substantial technologies. In May 2023, despite the turmoil on Australian Land 8116 Phase 2, Hanwha Aerospace placed a significant order with Bisalloy Steels for Egyptian program. At a military parade on 25 October 2023, the Egyptian Army unveiled the K9A1EGY in service with the 4th Armored Division.

On 1 July 2024, media reported that the exact number of exports is 216 K9A1EGY, 39 K10, and 51 K11. Previously, Egypt received K9A1 and K10 vehicles with 1,000 horsepower Korean-made SMV1000 engines for testing purposes.

On 5 October 2024, Arab Defense reported that the Ministry of Military Production announced local manufacturing of the SMV1000 engine by the state-owned Helwan Casting Company, also known as Military Factory 9. In addition, Egypt is working with Hanwha Aerospace in transferring manufacturing technology and installing production lines. The Military 200 will be the main manufacturer, and the Military 100 will produce the CN98 cannon and armored steel. Moreover, Egypt plans to become the regional center to export the K9 Thunder system to African and Arab countries, and the Minister of Military Production confirmed negotiations with a number of countries.

=== Romania ===
On 23 September 2022, Romanian Minister of National Defense Vasile Dîncu visited South Korea and signed a letter of intent to strengthen defense cooperation. On 26 September, Romanian media reported that the military was interested in purchasing K9 Thunder and K2 Black Panther. Besides the K9 howitzers, Romania also expressed interest in the K239 Chunmoo multiple rocket launcher and the K21 infantry fighting vehicle. On 6 February 2023, Hanwha Aerospace and Romarm signed a memorandum of understanding for Romanian production of powders, explosives and other ground military systems.

In July, it was reported that Romania planned to acquire 54 (3 systems of 18) K9 Thunders. Romania also discussed the possibility of license producing some parts locally with Hanwha Aerospace. One Romanian commentator, retired general Virgil Bălăceanu, argued that the K9 acquisition was part of a broader shift back to tracked and away from wheeled vehicles in military doctrine, motivated by the observed importance of all-terrain mobility in combat during the Russian invasion of Ukraine. A second stage of the program, however, includes the acquisition of two systems consisting of 18 wheeled howitzers each intended to equip the lighter Vânători de munte units.

The contract bid for the tracked systems started on 29 July 2023, and three companies participated: BMC Savunma Sanayi with the T-155 Firtina, Krauss-Maffei Wegmann with the Panzerhaubitze 2000, and Hanwha with the K9 Thunder. Of the three participants, only Hanwha progressed to the second phase of the bid, which involved negotiations regarding the technical and financial proposal. The second phase was completed in April 2024, though no final contract was signed.

On 19 June 2024, Romanian Defense Minister Angel Tîlvăr finally decided to introduce 54 K9s worth ₩1.3 trillion ($920 million) during an official meeting with South Korean Defense Minister Shin Won-sik, who is visiting Romania. The Romanian version is called K9 Tunet and will have the "most modern technical specifications" of the K9 according to Peter Bae, the vice president of Hanwha Aerospace Europe. The first 18 vehicles will be completely built at the Changwon factory in Korea while the rest will be assembled in Romania.

On 9 July 2024, Hanwha Aerospace signed the ₩1.3 trillion contract with the Romanian Ministry of Defense to supply 54 K9s and 36 K10s, including ammunition and support equipment packages. Hanwha will deliver the vehicle from 2027 in cooperation with a local defense company in Romania.

Hanwha plans to build the local production factory in Petrești, Dâmbovița County. Named the Hanwha Armoured Vehicle Centre of Excellence (H-ACE) Europe, the facility will be the first of its kind in Europe. With an area of 180,000 m^{2}, the factory will also feature testing facilities, a driving test track and advanced assembly lines. The construction began in February 2026. Meanwhile, Hanwha will deliver 18 K9s and 12 K10s from South Korea by autumn 2026. All vehicles will be delivered in three batches over a period of five years.

=== Vietnam ===
The negotiation for K9 Thunder began when Nguyễn Xuân Phúc, the president of Vietnam, visited South Korea for the 30th anniversary of diplomatic ties in 2022.

In March 2023, Vietnam's highest military figure Phan Văn Giang and other officials showed interests in the K9 by visiting ROKA K9 operator unit and had discussion with Hanwha Aerospace on the potential K9 procurement for VPA.

In April 2024, it was reported that the Vietnam Ministry of National Defence has officially outlined the K9 procurement plan to its South Korean counterpart, with Korean officials willingly support the deal. 108 units was mentioned as the potential number.

On 27 July 2025, Hanwha Aerospace announced that 20 K9s will be delivered to Korea Trade-Investment Promotion Agency (KOTRA) as the program is signed between two governments, and all export processes for delivery of systems and vehicles will be carried out through intergovernmental transactions (G2G) through KOTRA. The amount of the contract is ₩351,758,967,000, which excludes MRO. Vietnam confirmed the purchase on 11 August during Tô Lâm's visit to South Korea.

=== Failed bids ===
==== Denmark ====
The K9 Thunder participated in a bid against Nexter Systems' CAESAR 8x8 and Soltam Systems ATMOS 2000. In March 2017, the Danish military announced it had selected the competing CAESAR 8x8 instead.

In January 2023, Denmark requested Hanwha Aerospace, Nexter Systems, and Lockheed Martin to submit a proposal to fill up the gap created by the donation of entire fleet of CAESAR 8x8 to Ukraine, which Lockheed Martin refused by offering a high cost. However, Denmark leveraged the situation to make ongoing negotiations in favor of Elbit Systems. On 25 January, Denmark made an agreement with Elbit Systems to purchase ATMOS 2000 and PULS (Precise and Universal Launching System), and signed the contract in March without notifying anything to Hanwha and Nexter despite Denmark being the requester.

==== United Arab Emirates ====
The UAE failed to acquire K9s due to German arms restrictions on the use of the MT 881 Ka-500 diesel engines, according to a South Korean MOFA official.

==== United Kingdom ====
In September 2021, Hanwha Defense launched Team Thunder joined by Leonardo UK (navigation, FCS, electronics), Pearson Engineering (manufacturing), Horstman (suspension), and Soucy Defense (track) to participate in the Mobile Fires Platform (MFP) program, starting in late 2023 to replace Britain's AS90 with a K9A2 variant. The team expanded as Lockheed Martin UK (turret & autoloader) joined Team Thunder in March 2022. The K9A2 was first revealed in the United Kingdom during Defense Vehicle Dynamics 2022 at UTAC Millbrook Proving Ground in September 2022.

In March 2023, the United Kingdom purchased 14 Archers from Swedish inventory to fill the gap after transferring 32 AS90s to Ukraine. Archer is one of the competitors of the MFP.

British Ministry of Defense requested the Team Thunder to conduct tests on CRT with K9A2 technology demonstrator.

On 24 April 2024, the UK announced its selection of the RCH 155 for the British Army's Mobile Fires Platform programme, as a successor for the AS-90. The vehicles will be built in both Germany and the UK with over 100 UK-based suppliers manufacturing components. The platform will consist of the Remote-Controlled Howitzer 155mm (RCH 155) weapon module fitted to the rear half of the Boxer mechanised infantry vehicle (MIV) and will be in service with the Royal Artillery by the end of the decade.

== Variants and upgrades ==
- XK9: experimental prototype. 2 built
- K9 Thunder: the first-production variant for the Republic of Korea Armed Forces
  - T-155 Firtina (Storm): Turkish variant of the K9. Manufactured by Turkish Land Forces with subsystems from South Korea. The turret is modified to store 30 ammunition instead of 32 while increasing hull stored ammunition from 16 to 18. The vehicle has APU installed, but lacks panoramic scope for manual firing
    - Gürhan: hybrid engine test vehicle of the T-155
    - T-155 Firtina 2: Turkish upgrade of the T-155 Firtina
- K9 PIP (Product Improvement Program): K9 upgrade plan by South Korea, noticeably adding APU and better FCS. The upgrade later evolved to the K9A1 with more modifications.
  - AS9 "Aussie Thunder": offered Australian variant for the LAND 17 program. It featured enhanced FCS, BMS-F, RWS, anti-tank mine protection, and suspension upgrade to support increased weight.
  - PK9: a modified K9 chassis used to produce Polish AHS Krab self-propelled howitzer. License produced by Huta Stalowa Wola.
  - K9 Vajra-T (Lightning): Indian variant of the K9. Manufactured by Larsen & Toubro under license with 50% Indian components. It is customized for desert and alpine operations, and is the first variant to equip Safran MINEO DFSS, a dedicated gunner's sight for direct firing capability similar to main battle tanks.
  - K9FIN Moukari (Sledge-hammer): Finnish variant of the K9 transferred from the Republic of Korea Army inventory after overhaul and upgrades. Finnish modifications were performed by Millog.
  - K9EST Kõu (Thunder): Estonian variant of the K9 transferred from the Republic of Korea Army inventory after overhaul and upgrades. Estonian modifications were performed by Go Craft.
  - K9A1: First enhanced variant for the Republic of Korea Armed Forces, and is in service since 2018. All K9s operated by South Korea will be upgraded to A1 or future variant by 2030.
    - K9 VIDAR (versatile indirect artillery system) (Batch I): Norwegian variant of the K9A1 with Norwegian subsystems and increased protection by installing spall liner. Uses Safran MINEO DFSS for direct firing.
      - K9 VIDAR (Batch II): second production batch of the K9 VIDAR. It has visible changes such as driver's optics.
      - AS9 Huntsman: Australian variant of the K9 VIDAR with additional armor package and enhanced suspension. New hull design is similar to the AS21 Redback.
        - K9 Tunet: Romanian variant, will feature the "most modern technical specifications" of the K9. No further information available.
    - K9A1EGY: Egyptian variant of the K9A1. Will be produced under license in Egypt.
    - K9PL (Batch I): Polish variant of the K9A1. Equipped with the Polish network system and fire control system. First 48 secondhand vehicles are known as K9GF.
      - K9PL (Batch II): enhanced variant of the Batch I with 13 additional systems.
- K9A2: second enhanced variant for the Republic of Korea Armed Forces. 1 prototype built and shown to the public in 2022, and is in development. Also known as K9A2 Block-I to differentiate from 58 caliber variant.
  - K9A2 Block-II: 155 mm 58 caliber variant of K9A2. Proposal stage only.
  - K9MH/XM1776: combines the CN98 155 mm/52-caliber gun, a fully automated artillery module derived from the K9A2, and a heavy 8×8 wheeled chassis in a new artillery system optimized for operational mobility.
- K9A3: fully automated and unmanned K9A2. Under development.

- K10 ARV (ammunition resupply vehicle): automatic resupplying vehicle for the K9 based on the same platform
  - K10 VIDAR (versatile indirect artillery system): Norwegian variant of the K10
  - K10EGY: Egyptian variant of the K10
  - K10 AARV (armored ammunition resupply vehicle): enhanced protection variant of the K10 ARV
    - AS10: Australian variant of the K10 AARV – similar configuration to the AS9
    - AS10C2: suggested protected command & control post variant based on the AS10

- K11 FDCV (fire direction control vehicle): fire direction control vehicle based on the K10
  - K11EGY: Egyptian variant of the K11 with anti-ship mission capability added
- K11A1: enhanced variant of the K11. It remotely operates up to three K9A3 howitzers and is armed with the RCWS, anti-air missile launchers, and additional armor plate for mine protection.

== Operators ==
A map of operators of the K9 Thunder or its variants

=== Current operators ===
Australia – 6 AS9 Huntsman and 1 AS10 AARV delivered as of August 2026.

- Batch I: Two AS9 and one AS10 produced in South Korea.
- Batch II: 28 AS9 and 14 AS10 produced in Australia.

Egypt – At least 6 K9A1EGYs, 1 K10EGY, and 1 K11 delivered as of December 2025.

- Egypt placed an order for 216 K9A1EGY, 39 K10EGY, and 51 K11 in February 2022. Production starts in 2022 Q4 at Hanwha Defense in South Korea.

Estonia – 30 K9EST Kõu in service in the Estonian Land Forces as of November 2025. 6 more on order. 24 modified as of July 2024.

- Estonia placed an order for 12 used K9 with an option for 12 additional systems in June 2018. Estonia exercised an option for 6 additional howitzers in October 2019. Deliveries began in 2020. Estonia received a total of 30 vehicles as of November 2025.

Finland – 96 K9FIN Moukari in service in the Finnish Army as of 2025. All (96) purchased vehicles are scheduled for modification by 2030.

- Finland placed an order for 48 used K9s with an option for 48 additional systems in March 2017. 10 additional units were ordered in 2021 and 2022. 38 more ordered in 2022, using full option contract signed in 2017.
- Finland signed another deal worth 940 billion won (546 million euros) to purchase additional 112 K9 self-propelled howitzers from South Korea in April 2026.

India – 100 K9 Vajra-T in service in the Indian Army, with 100 more on order, and 335 approved for purchase.

- Batch I: 10 Vajra-T produced in South Korea. 90 Produced in India.
- Batch II: 100 Vajra-T being produced in India.
- Batch III: 335 Vajra-T to be produced in India.

Norway – 28 K9 VIDAR and 14 K10 VIDAR in service in the Norwegian Army as of February 2025.

- Batch I: 24 K9 VIDARs and 6 K10 VIDARs, to replace the M109A3GNM, with an option for another 24 K9 and additional K10. First deliveries took place in 2019.
- Batch II: 4 K9 VIDARs and 8 K10 VIDARs were ordered in November 2022.
- Batch III: 24 K9 VIDARs and unknown number of K10s was signed in September 2025.

Poland – 168 (December 2025) PK9 produced for AHS Krab and 218 (December 2025) K9PL (Batch I) were delivered for the Polish Land Forces.

- PK9: 120 will be produced as part of the AHS Krab program. 24 were built in Korea, and 96 are produced under license in Poland. 2 ordered in 2020. 48 additional Krabs were ordered by Poland, and 54 were ordered by Ukraine in 2022. 96 ordered in December 2024.
- K9PL: Poland ordered 212 K9PL (B1) in August 2022. Another 6 K9PL (B1) and 146 K9PL (B2) ordered in December 2023. All vehicles are expected to be delivered by 2027.

South Korea – An estimated 1,036 K9/K9A1 and 450 K10 are in service in the Republic of Korea Army and the Republic of Korea Marine Corps as of November 2025.

- K9: 1,136 produced (1998–2017, Batch I-X). In process of upgrading to K9A1.
- K9A1: 74 (estimate) new production (2018–2019, Batch XI). At least 200 confirmed upgraded as of February 2022 by Army CMD out of 600 planned by 2027. 174 K9s from the ROKA inventory were upgraded to K9A1 then sold to foreign nations as of November 2025.
- K10: At least 450 (lower estimate) produced (2006–2019, Batch I-VI). (Note: The Republic of Korea Armed Forces does not report the exact number of vehicles in possession. However, based on the press release by STX Engine on 9 August 2017, a total of 2,100 engines were either delivered or being produced, and 333 pieces among those went to Turkey and Poland. Therefore, 1,767 engines were used for K9 Batch I-X (approx 1,136) plus replacements and reserves, which results an estimated 450 (if 2017 Indian and Korean order is included) to 550 engines were used for K10 Batch I-V. 450 is the minimum estimate, which excludes Batch VI production.)
- K9A2: To be upgraded from K9 after 2027.
- The Republic of Korea Army plans to produce 889 K9A3s to replace aging K55A1s.

Romania – 1 K9 Tunet delivered as of April 2026. K-AIC participant.

- On 10 July 2024, Hanwha Aerospace signed a ₩1.3 trillion contract with the Romanian Ministry of Defense to supply 54 K9 Tunet self-propelled howitzers and 36 K10 ARVs, including ammunition and support equipment packages. The first 18 howitzers and 12 ammunition resupply vehicles will be delivered by autumn 2026.

Turkey – 280 T-155 Firtina I in service in the Turkish Land Forces.

- The Turkish Land Forces produced 281 T-155 Firtina I. Turkey originally sought to manufacture 350 (280 for domestic use and 70 for exports) by 2011. Germany's veto on export of Korean licensed MTU engines via Turkey prevented the export of T-155 as well.
- 140 T-155 Firtina II (new generation) have been ordered by the Turkish Army, and deliveries started in January 2021 with 3 Firtina II used for the trials, 6 more were delivered in January 2023.

=== Future operators ===
Spain

- Spain signed a memorandum of understanding with Hanwha for the procurement of up to 128 K9, 120 K10, 21 (potentially X/K12 developed jointly with FFG) recovery vehicles, and 11 K11 C2 vehicles with a budget of €4.55 billion (U.S. $5.3 billion).

United States

- At AUSA 2024, the US military mentioned its interest for a wheeled howitzer under the "mobile tactical cannon" capability. Several self-propelled howitzers will be evaluated, among which K9A2, the Archer, the RCH 155 on two vehicles - the Piranha 10×10 and the Boxer, and the SIGMA 155 from Elbit Systems. The MArG-52 later joined the competition. The system will be selected in 2026, and a contract for a certain number of cannons is planned for 2027. The systems mentioned include the Archer and the RCH 155. On August 18, 2026, Hanwha Defense USA announced that it had won a U.S. Army contract to provide six prototype K9 Mobile Howitzers (K9MH) variant, with an option for an additional 12, for the Army's Mobile Tactical Cannon program. Hanwha will establish an integration and test facility in Opelika, Alabama, as part of its U.S. production and support plans. It was officially designated as XM1776 on October 13, 2026 at the Association of the United States Army 2026.

Vietnam – Contract signed. K-AIC participant.

- Up to 108 units to replace older 122 mm, 152 mm and 155 mm artillery units currently in service. The deal between Hanwha Aerospace and the Vietnamese government, signed in January 2025, involves the acquisition of approximately 20 units of the K9A1 Thunder self-propelled howitzer for an estimated $300 million. This is the first time Vietnam has purchased weaponry from South Korea. The agreement goes beyond a simple arms sale, as it includes technology transfers, officer training, and joint military exercises. The deal is a crucial step in Vietnam's military modernization efforts, which aim to move away from its dependence on aging Soviet-era equipment and diversify its defense partnerships.

=== K9 User Club ===
Since 2022, users of the K9 howitzer have held an annual conference consisting of three working group sessions: operation, education, and maintenance. Military officials from participating countries are expected to share their various experiences and expertise gained during K9 operations, as well as to discuss optimal methods for operating the howitzer. Additionally, representatives from the defence industry partners of K9, both from member and non-member countries, attended the meeting to present advanced technologies and explore potential cooperation. The goal is to operate the howitzer at maximum efficiency and to create synergy within the defence industry through collaboration.

K9 User Club conferences
Year	Host	Participating members	Observers
2022	South Korea	Australia, Estonia, Finland, Norway	
2023	Norway	Australia, Estonia, Finland, Poland, South Korea	Canada
2024	Finland	Australia, Estonia, Norway, Poland, South Korea	United States
2025	Poland	Australia, Estonia, Finland, Norway, Romania, South Korea	Sweden, United States
2026	Estonia	Australia, Finland, Norway, Poland, Romania, South Korea	Spain, Sweden, United States
2027	Australia		

=== Potential operators ===
Canada – In evaluation

- Korea has offered the K9 for the Canadian Army's artillery modernization project.

Czech Republic

- A Czech delegation, which included former Prime Minister Jan Fischer, visited Hyundai Rotem, Hanwha Aerospace, and Doosan Enerbility from November 28-30, 2024. At Hyundai Rotem, they reviewed the custom design and manufacturing capabilities for South Korea's high-speed rail technology as well as the production lines for K2 tanks and armored vehicles. The delegation toured the manufacturing processes for major defense equipment at Hanwha Aerospace, including the K9 self-propelled howitzer and the K10 ammunition resupply vehicle.
- The Czech Republic's Ministry of Defense has threatened to halt payments for 62 Caesar 8x8 howitzers purchased from the French defense firm KNDS. According to a letter from Chief Armaments Director Lubor Koudelka, the Czech Army is concerned that KNDS has repeatedly failed to meet critical performance standards.

Iraq

- On March 26, 2025, A delegation from the Iraqi Artillery, headed by Major General Walid Khalid, toured a Hanwha factory in South Korea to gain insights into its operations. The group received an in-depth briefing on the K9 artillery system, along with information on the K10 ammunition loading vehicle and the K11 command and fire control vehicle. The commander of the Iraqi artillery corps emphasized some of the characteristics and capabilities that the artillery requires to be present in order to increase the artillery corps' capabilities.

Qatar

- Qatar has dispatched soldiers to K-AIC (Korea-Army International Course), an international training program organized by the ROK Armed Forces, to participate in K2 and K9 operational training courses.

Sweden – In evaluation

- In 2025, the Swedish Army expressed interest in acquiring tracked self-propelled artillery systems, specifically the South Korean K9 Thunder, to complement its existing wheeled Archer artillery. The motivation stems from operational challenges in subarctic terrain, such as deep snow and limited road infrastructure, particularly in northern Finland where Sweden may support NATO defense efforts. Tracked systems like the K9 offer superior mobility in such environments. The Army aims to establish two battalions equipped with approximately 36 K9 units, aligning with similar acquisitions by Finland and Norway to enhance interoperability and logistics within the Nordic defense cooperation.

=== Acquisition table ===
Operators (December 2025)	Orders	K9; Firtina I	K9A1; AHS Krab; Firtina II	K9A2; K9MH	Losses	In service	Note
(South Korea) Republic of Korea Army and Marine Corps	K9 (I-X); 1,136	1,136 - 374 - A (-B)	—	—	—	762 - A	Batch I-X: 1,136 K9s. Upgrades in progress.
(South Korea) Republic of Korea Army and Marine Corps	K9A1 (XI); 74 (-180)	—	74 + 374 + A - 174 (-6)	—	—	274 + A	Batch XI: 74 K9A1s. 174 transferred. A: Unrevealed numbers (after Feb 2022), est. 600 total planned by 2027.
(South Korea) Republic of Korea Army and Marine Corps	K9A2	—	—	(+B)	—	0	B: To be upgraded from K9, after 2027.
(Turkey) Turkish Land Forces	Firtina I 281	281	—	—	1	280	281 T-155 delivered. 1 demolished in Syria.
(Turkey) Turkish Land Forces	Firtina II; 140	—	13 (+127)	—	—	13	
(Poland) Polish Land Forces	PK9 (I-IV); 266 (-54)	—	24 + 72 - 54 18 (+152)	—	—	42 18	Batch I: 24 produced in Korea. Batch II: 96; 54 donated. Upgraded PK9 since 97th Polish unit (151st total production). Batch III: 48 PK9s. Batch IV: 96 PK9s.
(Poland) Polish Land Forces	K9PL (I); 48 + 170	—	48 + 170 (-218)	—	—	218	Batch I: 48 transferred from the ROKA (K9GF), and 170 new built. All to be upgraded to K9PL (II).
(Poland) Polish Land Forces	K9PL (II); 146	—	0 (+146) (+218)	—	—	0	Batch II: 146 K9PLs.
(Finland) Finnish Army	Moukari (I-III); 208	—	96 → 48 (+160)	—	—	96	Batch I: 48 K9A1s transferred from the ROKA. Batch II: 48 upgraded K9A1s from the ROKA. Batch III: 112 upgraded K9A1s from the ROKA.
(India) Indian Army	Vajra-T (I-III); 535	—	10 + 90 (+100)	(+335)	—	100	Batch I: 100 K9A1s. First 10 produced in Korea. Batch II: 100 K9A1s. Batch III: 335 K9A2s.
(Norway) Norwegian Army	VIDAR (I-III); 52	—	28 (+24)	—	—	28	Batch I: 24 K9A1s with 6 K10s. Batch II: 4 K9A1s with 8 K10s. Batch III: 24 K9A1s.
(Estonia) Estonian Land Forces	Kõu (I-II); 36	—	30 → 24 (+6) → (+12)	—	—	30	Batch I: 24 K9A1s transferred from the ROKA. Batch II: 12 upgraded K9A1s from the ROKA.
(Australia) Australian Army	AS9 (I-II); 30	—	2 (+28)	—	—	2	Batch I: 2 AS9s and 1 AS10 produced in Korea. Batch II: 28 AS9s and 14 AS10s.
(Egypt) Egyptian Army and Navy	K9A1EGY; 216	—	6 (+6) (+204)	—	—	6	Batch I: 216 K9A1s with 39 K10s and 51 K11s.
(Ukraine) Ukrainian Ground Forces	PK9 (I-II); 54 + 54	—	54 + 54	—	36	72	Batch I: 54 PK9s donated by the Polish Land Forces. Batch II: 54 PK9s. At least 36 destroyed and 6 damaged by Russian military.
(Romania) Romanian Land Forces	Tunet (I-III); 54	—	18 (+36)	—	—	1	Batch I: 18 K9A1s and 12 K10s produced in Korea. Batch II: 18 K9A1s with 12 K10s. Batch III: 18 K9A1s with 12 K10s.
People's Army of Vietnam	K9A1; 20	—	(+20)	—	—	0	Batch I: 20 K9A1s.
(Spain) Spanish Armed Forces	K9A1; 129	—	(+129)	—	—	0	Batch I: 129 K9A1s with 120 K10s.
United States Army	XM1776 (I-II); 9	—	—	1 (+8)	—	1	Batch I: 6 K9MHs. Batch II: 3 K9MHs.
In service	Total new orders 2,839	1,043 - A (-B)	935 + A (+861)	(+B)	37	1,942	A: K9A1 upgraded from K9 for the ROK. B: K9A2 upgraded from K9 for the ROK.
In service	Total new orders 2,839	Total acquired: 1,978; To be manufactured: 861			37	1,942	A: K9A1 upgraded from K9 for the ROK. B: K9A2 upgraded from K9 for the ROK.

Legend of the colored numbers in the table:

Systems assembled and produced in South Korea
Systems assembled or produced outside of South Korea
2nd hand sold/transferred [ - ] and bought/received [ + ]
System upgraded, one variant to the other [ - ] / [ + ]

== See also ==
Related development

- T-155 Firtina – (Turkey)
- AHS Krab – (Poland)
- K10 ARV – (South Korea)

Vehicle of comparable role, performance, and era

- 2S35 Koalitsiya-SV – (Russia)
- AS-90 – (United Kingdom)
- M109A6 – (United States)
- M1299 – (United States)
- PLZ-05 – (China)
- PLZ-45 – (China)
- Panzerhaubitze 2000 – (Germany)
- SSPH Primus – (Singapore)
- Type 99 – (Japan)
