= K10 ammunition resupply vehicle =

South Korean tracked logistics

K10 ARV
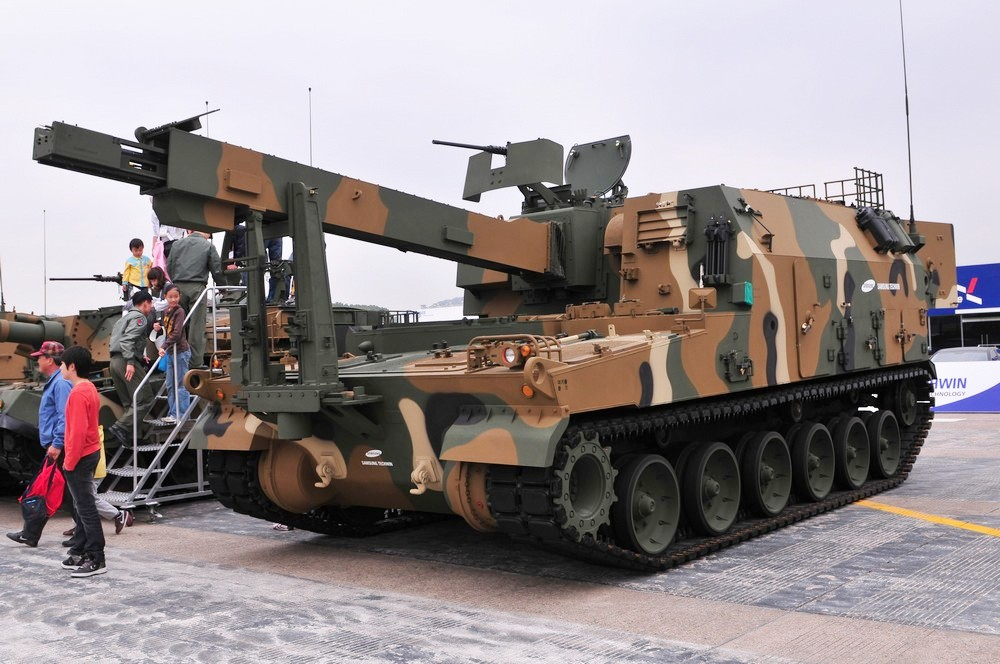
- Type: Ammunition resupply vehicle
- Place of origin: South Korea

Service history
- In service: 2006–present

Production history
- Designer: Samsung Techwin; Agency for Defense Development; Defense Agency for Technology and Quality
- Designed: 2002-2005
- Manufacturer: Hanwha Defense (Now Hanwha Aerospace)
- Unit cost: 2.68 billion KRW
- Produced: 2005–present
- Variants: K10 VIDAR; K10 AARV; AS10; AS10C2; K11 FDCV

Specifications
- Mass: Combat weight: 47 metric tons (46 long tons; 52 short tons)
- Crew: 3
- Engine: STX Engine/MTU Friedrichshafen MT881Ka-500 8-cylinder water-cooled diesel engine
- Payload capacity: 104 x 155 mm projectiles + 504 charges
- Drive: Tracked
- Transmission: SNT Dynamics/Allison Transmission X1100-5A3; 4 forward, 2 reverse
- Maximum speed: 67 km/h (42 mph)

The K10 ammunition resupply vehicle (ARV) is an automatic ammunition resupply vehicle based on the chassis of K9 Thunder, sharing most of the components and characteristics. IFS concept study started in November 1998 by Samsung Aerospace Industries and Pusan National University. Its design began in February 2002 by Samsung Techwin (previously Samsung Aerospace Industries), the Agency for Defense Development, and the DTaQ (Defense Agency for Technology and Quality), The army declared its completion in October 2005. The first vehicle rolled out in November 2006, with a price tag of 2.68 billion KRW. It was assigned to the 1st Artillery Brigade of the Republic of Korea Army. South Korea became the first nation to operate such type of military equipment.

The vehicle has a combat weight of 47 metric tons (46 long tons; 52 short tons), and can support a K9 team by carrying and resupplying 104 shells of 155 mm artillery ammunition and 504 units of charges under heavy fire. The vehicle is operated by a 3-person crew, requiring only one loader by applying fully automated control system. It transfers ammunition at a maximum speed of 12 rounds/min. It takes 37 minutes to fully load, and 28 minutes to empty the K10. It is often called the briquette car by military and defense industry officials.

The K10 AARV (armored ammunition resupply vehicle) is an enhanced protection variant of the K10 ARV. The first of its kind will be produced in Australia as the AS10.

The K11 FDCV is designed for the Egyptian military to provide command and control, reconnaissance, and communication for armored vehicles. The vehicle is based on K10, and has a high mobility.

== Variants ==
- K10 ARV (ammunition resupply vehicle): baseline automatic resupplying vehicle for K9 using the same chassis
  - K10 VIDAR (versatile indirect artillery system): Norwegian variant of the K10
  - K10 AARV (armored ammunition resupply vehicle): enhanced protection variant of K10 ARV
    - AS10: Australian variant of the K10 AARV; similar configuration to AS9
    - AS10C2: suggested protected command & control post variant based on AS10
- K11 FDCV (fire direction control vehicle): fire direction control vehicle based on K10
- POYRAZ: Turkish variant per tech transfer in T-155 Fırtına project. It has an auxiliary power unit, which the K10 ARV lacks, that allows the vehicle's crew to use electronics and communication systems, and to run an ammunition transfer system economically without the main engines being turned on. The ARV can carry up to 96 155 mm shells and is able to transfer 48 shells in 20 minutes. It has a range of 360 km.

== Operators ==
=== Current operators ===
Australia

- Australian Army - 1 AS10 AARV in service, 14 on order.

Norway

- Norwegian Army - 6 K10 VIDAR in service, 8 on order.

South Korea

- Republic of Korea Army and Republic of Korea Marine Corps - estimated 450 K10 are in service.

Turkey

- Turkish Land Forces - 71 POYRAZ

=== Future operators ===
Egypt

- Egyptian Army and Egyptian Navy - undisclosed amount of K10 and K11 ordered.

Romania

- Romanian Land Forces - 36 K10 on order.

== See also ==
Related development

- K9 Thunder

Vehicle of comparable role and configuration

- M992 field artillery ammunition supply vehicle
