= Poongsan Corporation =

South Korean company

- Native name: 주식회사 풍산
- Type: Public
- Traded as: KRX: 103140
- Industry: Defense; Metalworking
- Founded: 22 October 1968; 58 years ago
- Founder: Ryu Chan-woo
- Headquarters: Poongsan Bldg., 23, Chungjeong-ro, Seodaemun-gu, Seoul, South Korea
- Area served: Worldwide
- Key people: Ryu Jin (President & CEO)
- Products: Bi-metallic coins; Copper alloy processing products; Non-ferrous metal processing products; Precision forging products; Sporting and military ammunition
- Revenue: ▼ ₩4.1253 trillion (2023)
- Operating income: ▼ ₩228.6 billion (2023)
- Net income: ▼ ₩156.4 billion (2023)
- Total assets: ▲ ₩3.6606 trillion (2023)
- Total equity: ▲ ₩1.9660 trillion (2023)
- Owner: Poongsan Holdings (38.01%); National Pension Service (11.43%); Treasury stocks (2.53%); Other (0.2%)
- Number of employees: 3,469
- Parent: Poongsan Holdings
- Subsidiaries: PMC Ammunition Inc (USA)
- Website: Official website in English; Official website in Korean

- Poongsan Corporation
- Hangul: 풍산
- Hanja: 豊山
- RR: Pungsan
- MR: P'ungsan

Poongsan Corporation (Korean: 풍산) is a South Korean manufacturer of copper and alloy materials, ammunition and precision forging products founded in 1968. The company's main business areas are non-ferrous metal processing, such as bi-metallic coins and copper alloy products, which account for 70% of sales, and it also manufactures various military ammunition, gunpowder, and propellants. As of 2023, bimetallic coin products produced in Poongsan are exported to more than 70 countries and account for more than 50% of the global coin blank market.

== History ==
=== Non-ferrous metal industry ===
The Poongsan was established as Poongsan Metal Industry Co., Ltd. (Korean: 풍산금속공업; Hanja: 豊山金屬工業; RR: Pungsan Geumsok Gongeop) in October 1968, and began producing copper alloy products after completing the Bupyeong plant in 1969. The company began supplying brass coin blanks to Korea Minting and Security Printing Corporation in 1970, and in 1973, it entered the export market by winning a contract to supply coin blanks worth $3.5 million to Taiwan.

Starting with the first overseas supply, in 1985, it won a contract to supply 7,500 tons of coin blanks to India. By the late 1980s, coin blanks produced in Poongsan had been supplied to 30 countries, and manufactured commemorative coins for the 1986 Asian Games and the 1988 Seoul Olympics.

In the 1990s, the company developed its own bimetallic coin for euro currency made of copper alloy materials and began supplying it to the Netherlands and Italy in 2001.

The company's revenue in the coin blank market has been declining annually since 2013 due to the decline in the use of currency with the spread of electronic payment systems.

=== Defense industry ===
In 1970, it was designated as one of the five key companies for South Korea's industrialization policy and became the first private company to enter the defense industry. Later, in 1973, the Angang Ammunition Plant was completed in Gyeongju, Gyeongsangbuk-do, and it was also South Korea's first defense industry facility.

As a result of accelerating the industrialization of import substitution by research and development from 1973, in the late 1970s, all kinds of small, medium, and large-caliber rounds used in the Korean military began to be produced, and the localization rate of parts was 95 percent.

In 1982, after acquiring the 1st armory in Busan, it established a subsidiary, PMC, to produce various military and sports rounds based on small-caliber ammunition manufacturing technology.

Under an agreement with the South Korean government, the United States reportedly imported a total of 600,000 155 mm rounds from the South Korean military and Poongsan from 2022 to 2023 and provided them to Ukraine to cover the Ukrainian military's scarce ammunition inventory.

The impact of the Russo-Ukrainian war has sent demand and prices for military ammunition soaring, and exports of various large-caliber rounds abroad boosted sales in the company's defense division in 2023.

In August 2024, Poongsan reportedly asked the Ministry of Defense and the Defense Acquisition Program Administration to approve the export to export 81 mm mortar shells to Lebanon. Later, in October 2024, the Ministry of Defense and Defense Acquisition Program Administration expressed their position that ammunition exports would be possible if the lot number and country of origin information were removed and a non-disclosure contract was signed.

== Businesses ==
=== Non-ferrous meterial ===
Copper applications are Poongsan's main area of expertise. The company produces copper and copper alloy sheets and strips, tubes, rods, and wires for use in various industries. Poongsan is one of the world's largest suppliers of coin blanks. It was Korea's sole coin manufacturer in 1970, and it first exported coin blanks to Taiwan in 1973, then to other countries, including the EU and the U.S.

=== Defence ===
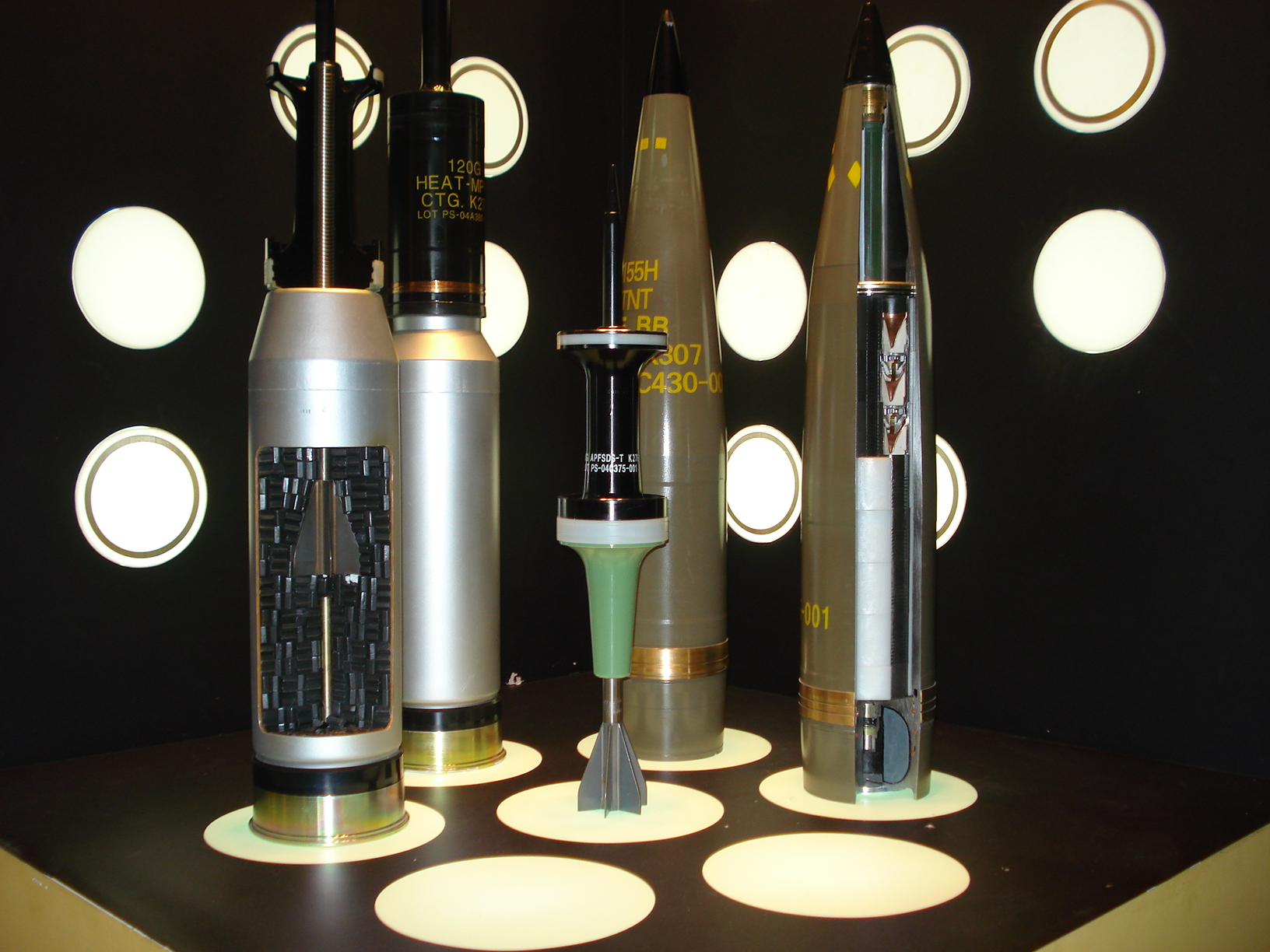
Poongsan ammunition

Poongsan produces a variety of ammunition types, such as 5.56-millimeter rifle bullets, 155 mm howitzer shells, anti-aircraft shells, mortar shells, tank shells, and naval artillery shells. The U.S. is Poongsan's largest ammunition export destination. The Middle East is a major market and also exports to Europe.

=== PMC Ammunition ===
PMC Ammunition, or Precision Made Cartridges, is manufactured in South Korea by the Poongsan Corporation (ISO certified) which produces cartridges ranging from small arms ammunition to large howitzer rounds for military and law enforcement, as well as civilian ammunition for consumers.

== Products ==
- 5.56×45mm NATO
- 105×617mmR
- 120×570mm NATO

== See also ==
- List of military headstamps
