= T-72 operators and variants =

T-72
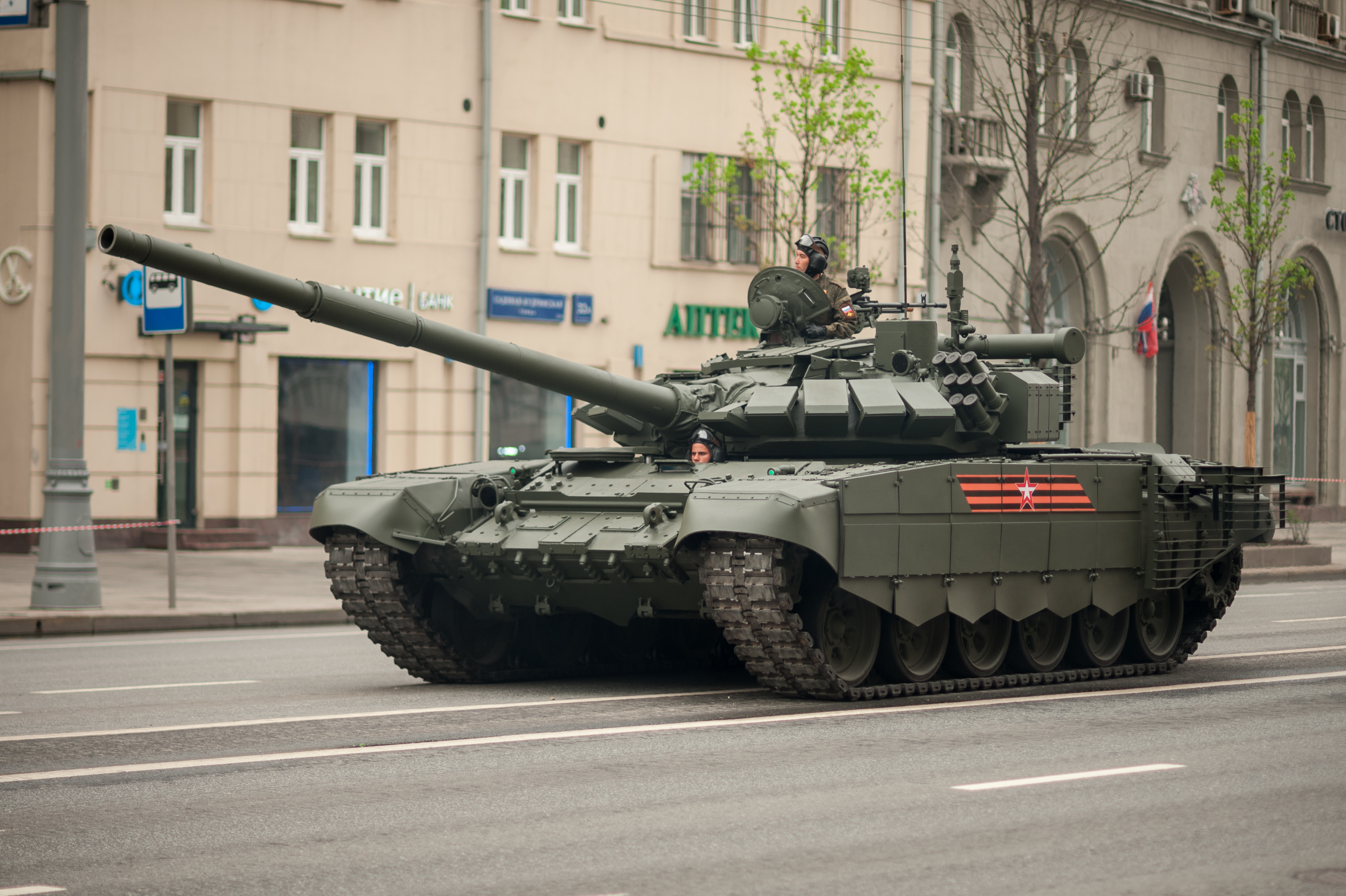
- A T-72B3 in Moscow 2018
- Type: Main battle tank
- Place of origin: Soviet Union

Service history
- In service: 1973–present

Production history
- Designer: Kartsev-Venediktov
- Designed: 1967–73
- Manufacturer: Uralvagonzavod
- Produced: 1973–present
- No. built: approx. 25,000

The T-72 is a Soviet-designed main battle tank that entered production in 1973. It replaced the T-54/55 series as the workhorse of Soviet tank forces (while the T-64 and T-80 served as the Soviet high-technology tanks with faster autoloaders, better mobility and armor). In front-line Russian service, T-72s are being upgraded or augmented by the T-90, itself a modernized version of the T-72B. The T-72 has been exported and produced in many countries.

== Operators ==
=== Current operators ===
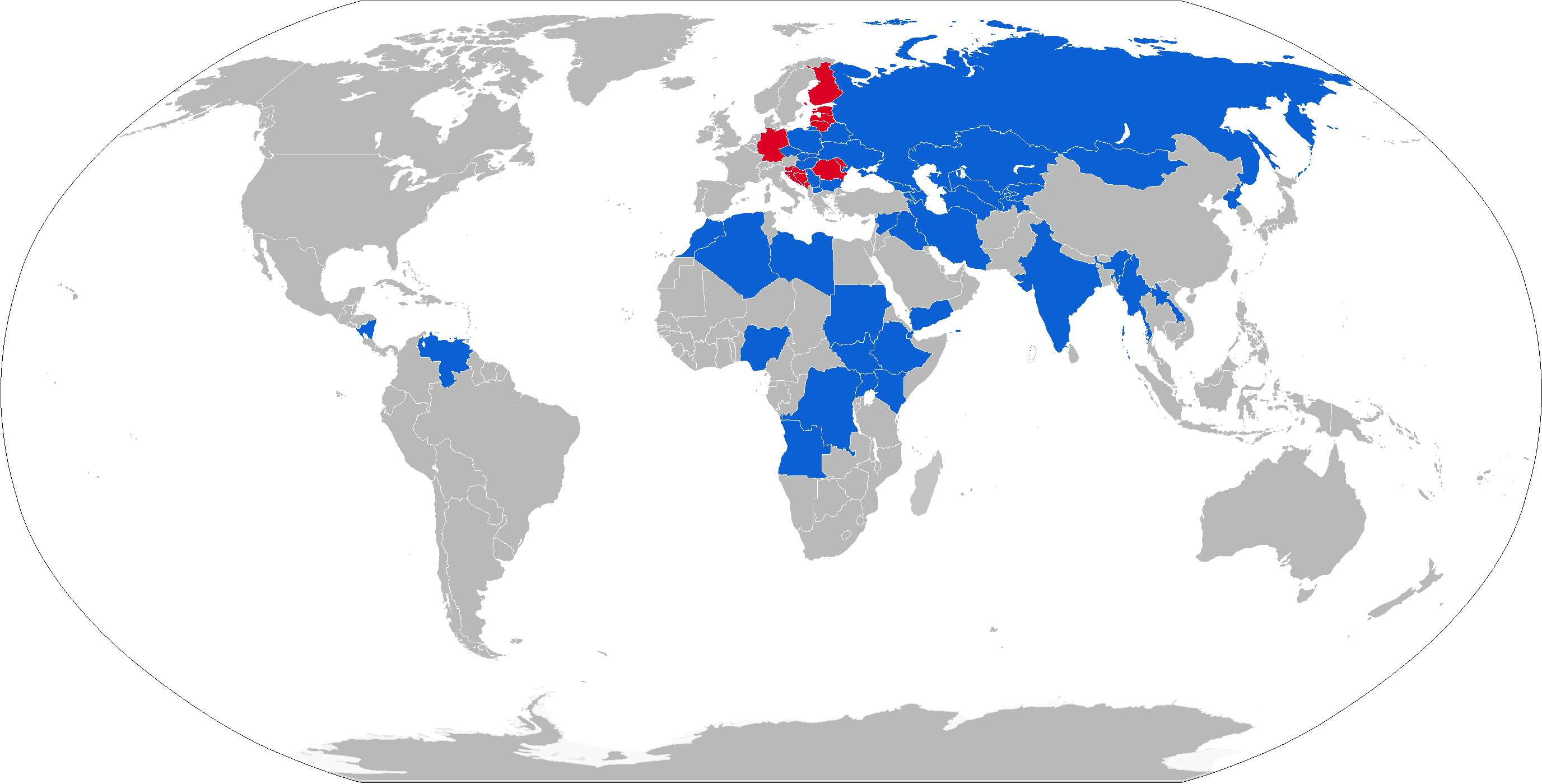
Operators Current Former

- Algeria – 325 T-72M1/M1M as of 2025.
- Angola – 50 T-72M1 as of 2023.
- Armenia – 100 T-72A, T-72B, T-72B3M as of 2025.
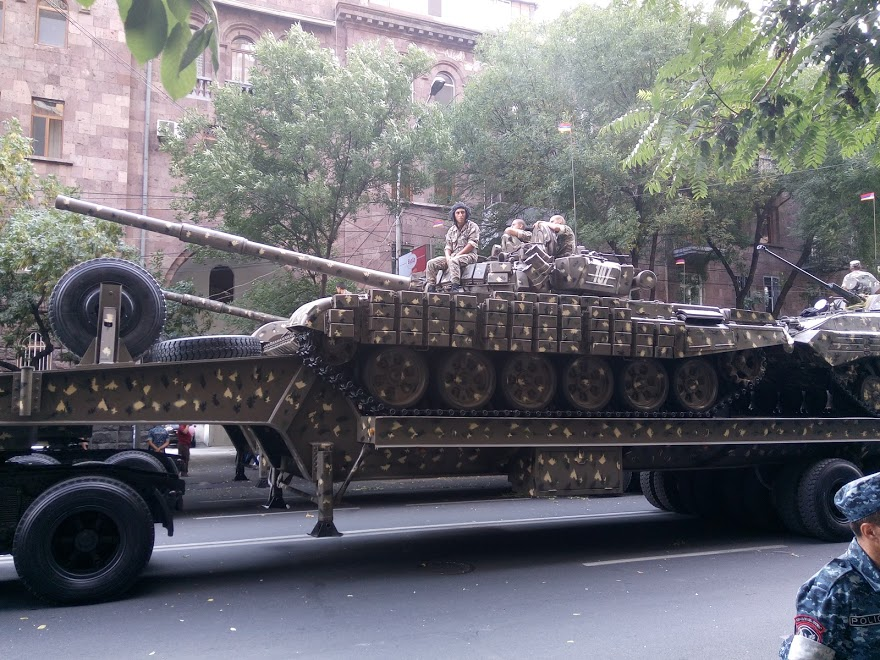
  Armenian Army T-72B during a military parade in Yerevan.
- Azerbaijan – ~405 T-72A, T-72AV, T-72B, and T-72SIM2 as of 2025.
- Belarus – 477 T-72B and 20 T-72B3 mod. 2016 as of 2025. Various T-72 modifications in reserve.
- Bulgaria – 90 T-72M1/M in service as of 2025.
- Croatia – 45 M-84A4 Sniper, which is an improved variant of the T-72M, as of 2025 awaiting replacement with the Leopard 2A8. 30 M-84A4 were be donated to Ukraine in 2025.
- Ethiopia – 100 T-72B/UA1 in service as of 2025. 50 bought from Yemen and 171 T-72UA1 vehicles reportedly ordered from Ukraine in 2011.
- Georgia –140 T-72B/B1/SIM1 in service as of 2025. Upgraded T-72 SIMs were upgraded in Georgia with assistance of Israel.
- Hungary – 44 T-72M1 in service as of 2025.
- India – 2,418 T-72M1 in service as of 2025.
- Iran – 480 T-72S in service as of 2025.
- Iraq - 178 T-72M/M1 in service as of 2009. Some T-72S MBTs in service with the PMF. Some T-72s have been upgraded and modernized by Iran with Rakhsh kits.
  - Kurdistan − < 63. Entered service for the Peshmerga after 1991.
- Kazakhstan – 350 T-72BA in service as of 2025.
- Kyrgyzstan – 150 in service as of 2025.
- Laos – 31 T-72B1MS in service as of 2025.
- Malaysia – 48 PT-91M in service as of 2025. Delivered by Poland (which is an improved variant of the T-72M1).
- Morocco – 40 T-72B and 47 T-72EA in service as of 2025.
- Mongolia –100 T-72A in service as of 2026.100 delivered.
- Myanmar – T-72S in service as of 2025. 300 received from Ukraine between 2000 and 2008
- Nicaragua – 20 T-72B1MS in service as of 2025.
- Nigeria – 10 T-72AV and 31 T-72M1 in service as of 2025.
- Poland – 201 PT-91 Twardy, which is an improved variant of the T-72M1, as of 2025. 382 T-72 and 232 PT-91 as of 2019. 2008 – 586 T-72M1 and T-72M1D, 135 T-72M1Z (T-72M1 upgraded to PT-91 standard), and 98 PT-91 in service 2006, 2007 – 597, 2005 – 644, 2004 – 649
- Russia – 700 T-72A/B/BA and 470 T-72B3 in active service. 488 T-72A and 99 T-72B/BA in store as of 2025. 1100 T-72B3, 550 T-72B3M, and more than 1000 T-72B in operation in 2022, 4800 variants of the T-72B in total. As of February 2023, the Russian Army operates 400 T-72B/BA, 500 T-72B3, and 250 T-72B3M tanks; the Russian Naval Infantry operates 170 T-72B/B3/B3Ms; the Russian Airborne Forces operates 50 T-72B3/B3M; while the 1st Army Corps and 2nd Army Corps operates some T-72A and T-72B tanks. 10,000 T-72 tanks of all variants in different conditions in storage.
- Serbia – 30 T-72B1MS and 195 M-84, which is an improved variant of the T-72M, as of 2025.
- Slovakia – 30 T-72M1, still in service in 2025.
- South Sudan – 80 T-72AV in service as of 2025. 96-101 units delivered in two shipments from Ukraine: first, 32 T-72 on the MV Faina in 2009, and second, 67 T-72 in 20XX. 2 T-72 tanks were destroyed during the Heglig Crisis.
- Sudan – 70 T-72AV as of 2023.
- South Ossetia – Reported
- Syrian Democratic Forces − Reported.
- Tajikistan – 28 T-72 Ural/A/AV/B and 3 T-72B1 in service as of 2025.
- Turkmenistan – 650 T-72 and T-72UMG in service as of 2025.
- Uganda – 40 T-72A and 10 T-72B in service as of 2025.
- Ukraine – 550 T-72 and 18 PT-91 Twardy in service as of 2025. In January 2014, Ukraine had 600 T-72 tanks all in storage. They were returned to active service since the War in Donbas, and several were captured and pressed into service during the 2022 Russian invasion of Ukraine, while others were donated by NATO members such as Poland and Czech Republic.
  - Russian separatist forces in Donbas
- Uzbekistan – 70 T-72 in service as of 2025.
- Venezuela – 92 T-72B1 in service as of 2025. Delivered in 2009–2012 from Russia. In June 2012, Russia and Venezuela agreed on deal for 100 more T-72.
- Yemen – 39 in 2003.
  - Houthis

=== Evaluation / aggressor training ===
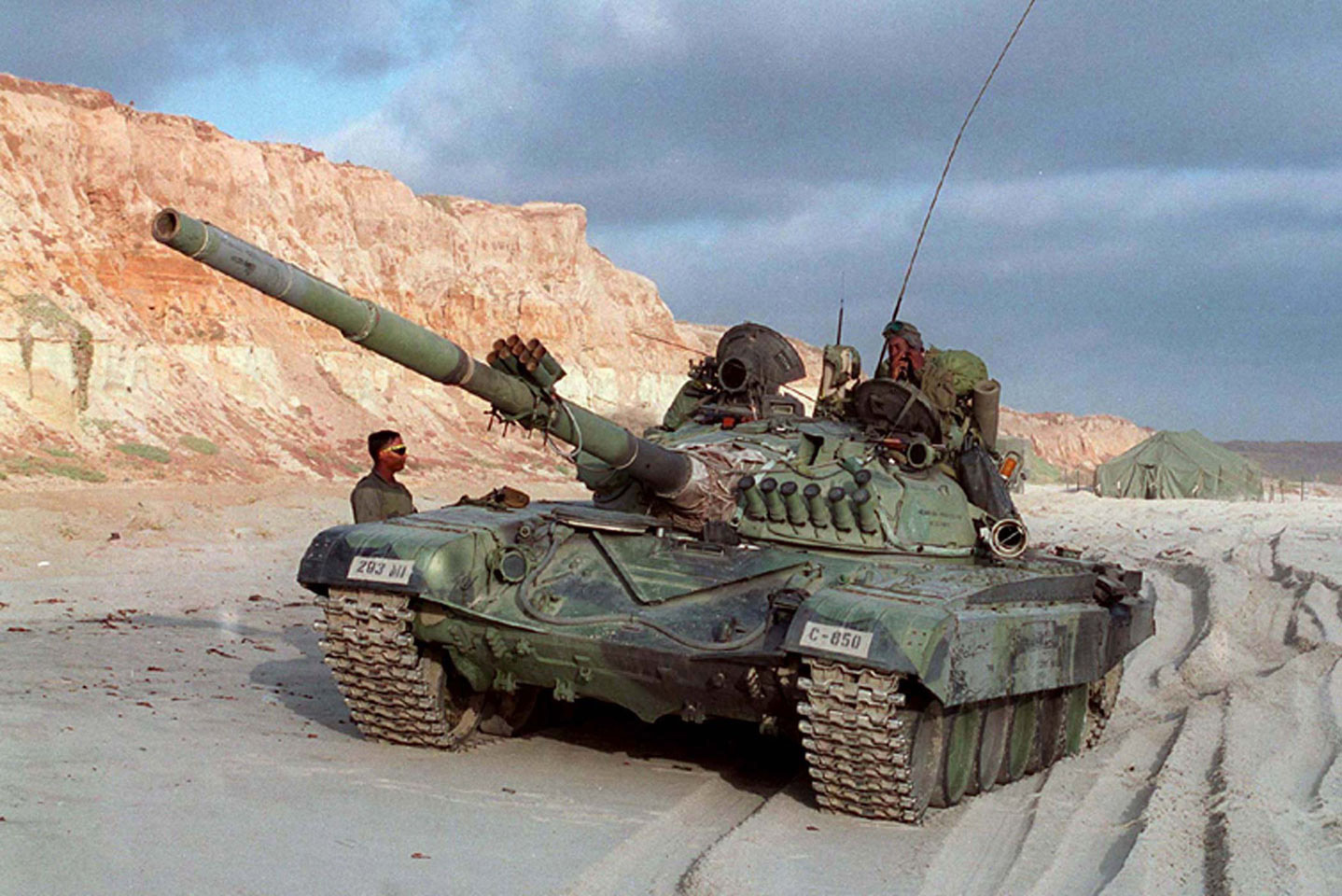
T-72M1 used by the 3rd Amphibious Assault Battalion, 1st Marine Division of US Marines at Camp Pendleton during Kernel Blitz 1997 exercise

- Australia – 1 donated by Germany to Australian Army for evaluation.
- Canada – Former East German tanks received at the end of the Cold War for OPFOR training. Out of service by 2000.
- China – 1 obtained from the exchange of industrial machinery in Romania for scientific research, which is called "Type 64". And as of 2023, a domestically modernized variant equipped with a new turret—reportedly intended for export to third countries—has also been spotted in China.
- South Korea – Used for aggressor training. Its presence was considered classified but released into public after army's invitation events.
- North Korea – 1 received from Iran in 1980s.
- Sweden – Acquired 8 former East German T-72s in 1991 primarily to evaluate Soviet armour. One has been preserved, while others are used as targets.
- United States – 90

=== Former operators ===
- Republic of Artsakh − ~20 T-72AV/B and 1 T-72SIM2 as of February 2023, seized by Azerbaijan following the 2023 Azerbaijani offensive in Nagorno-Karabakh.
- Chechen Republic of Ichkeria
- Democratic Republic of the Congo – 100 T-72AV delivered by Ukraine in 2010.
- Czech Republic – 30 T-72M4CZ in service as of 2025, but phased out in December that year as deep refurbishment was impracticable. 50 T-72M1s were donated to Ukraine between 2022 and 2023. Later all usable T-72M1 tanks were donated to Ukraine (last T-72M1s left Czechia in Spring 2025).
- Czechoslovakia – About 1,700 T-72/T-72M/T-72M1s were produced between 1981 and 1990. The Czechoslovak army had 815 T-72s in 1991. All were passed on to the successor states in 1993:
1. Czech Republic – 543
2. Slovakia – 272
- Ex-East German T-72s
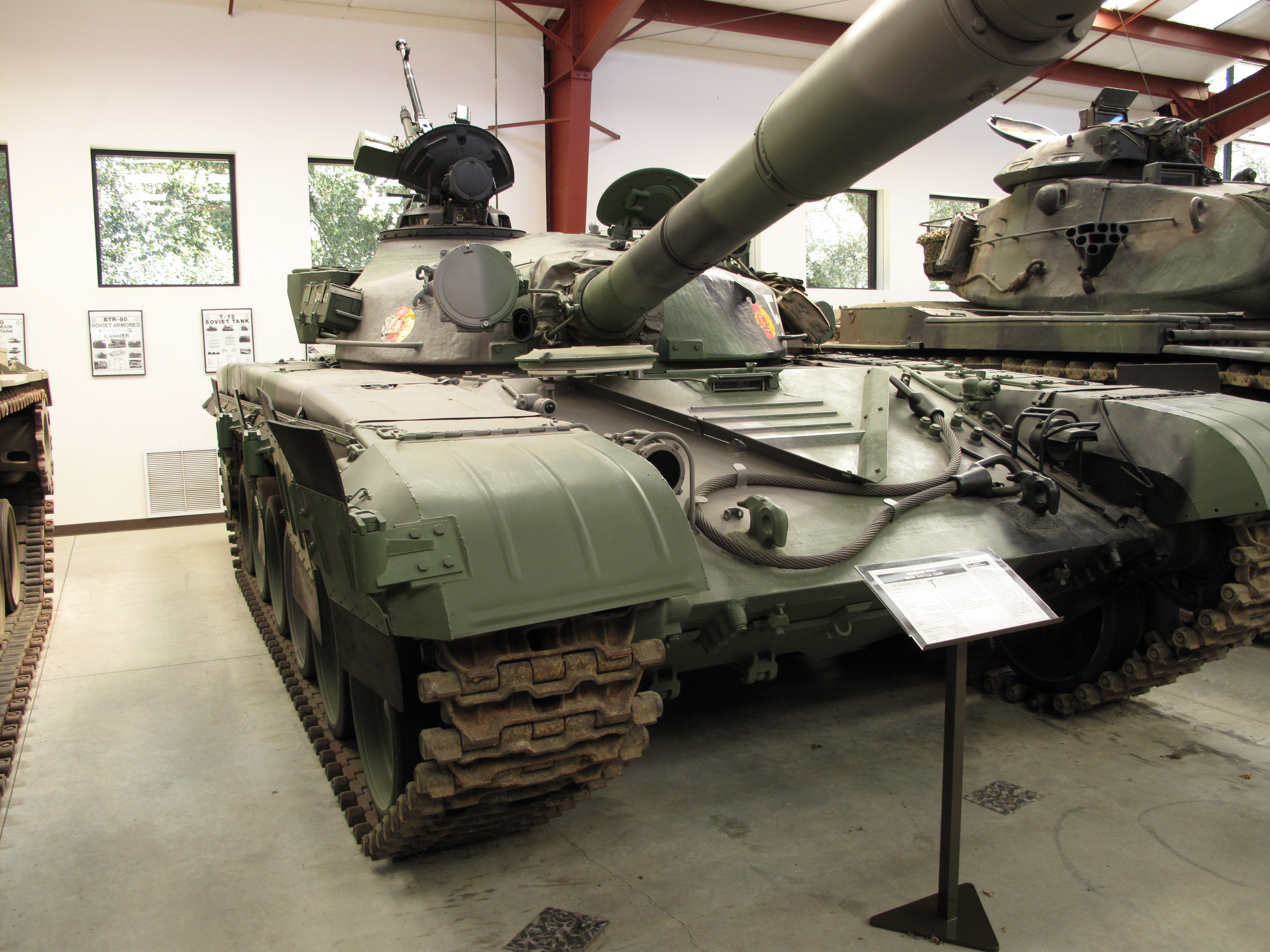
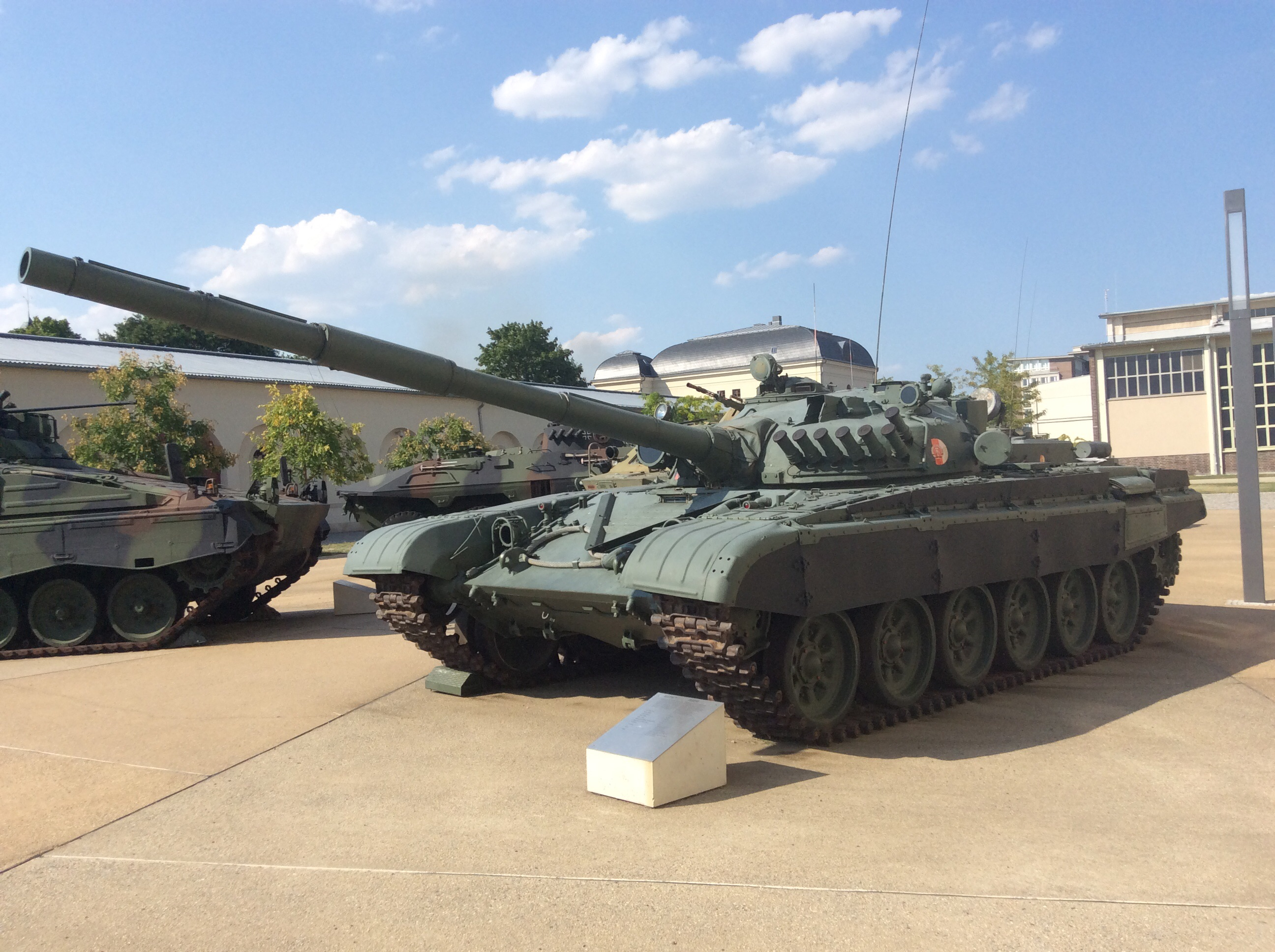
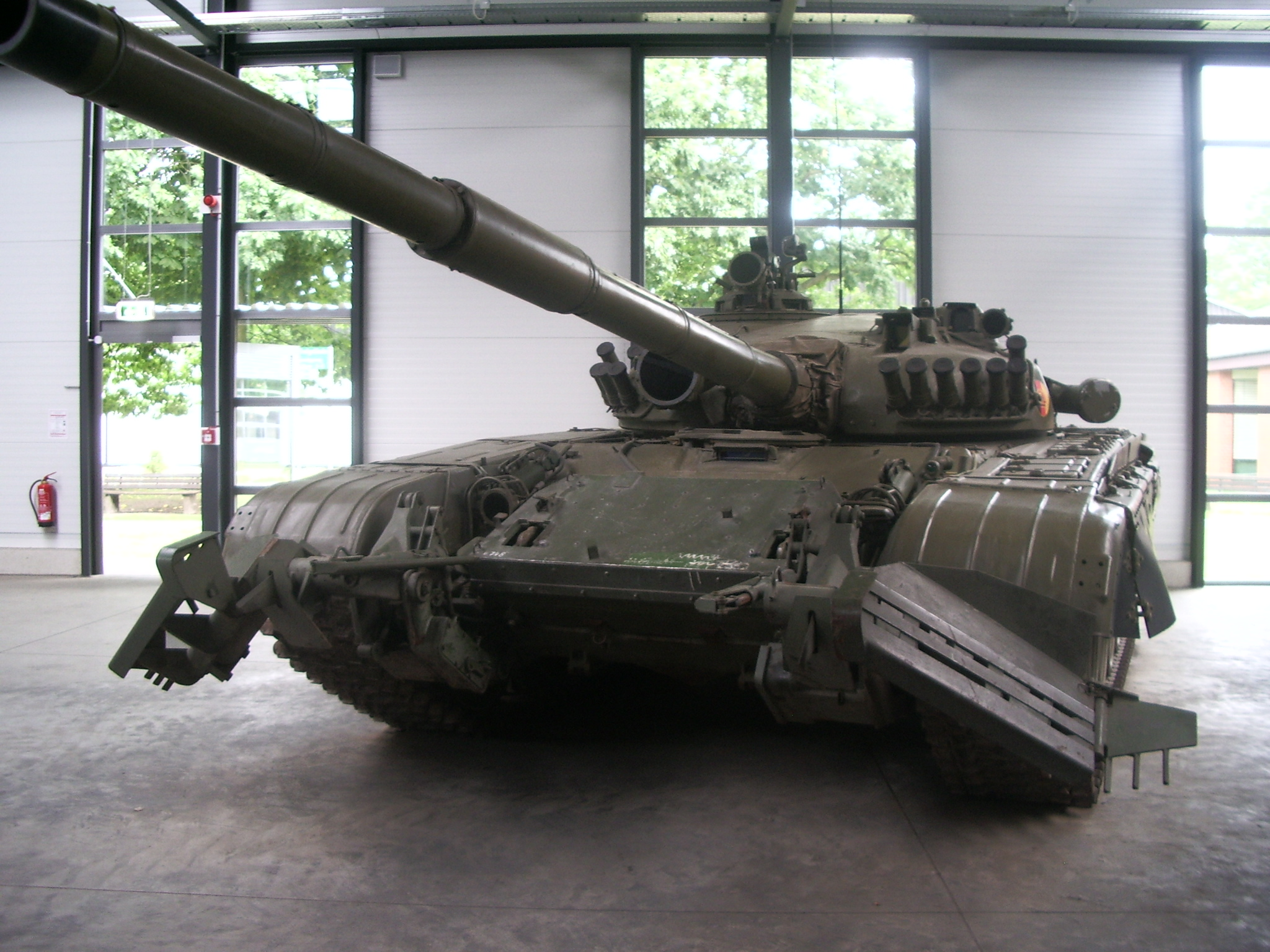
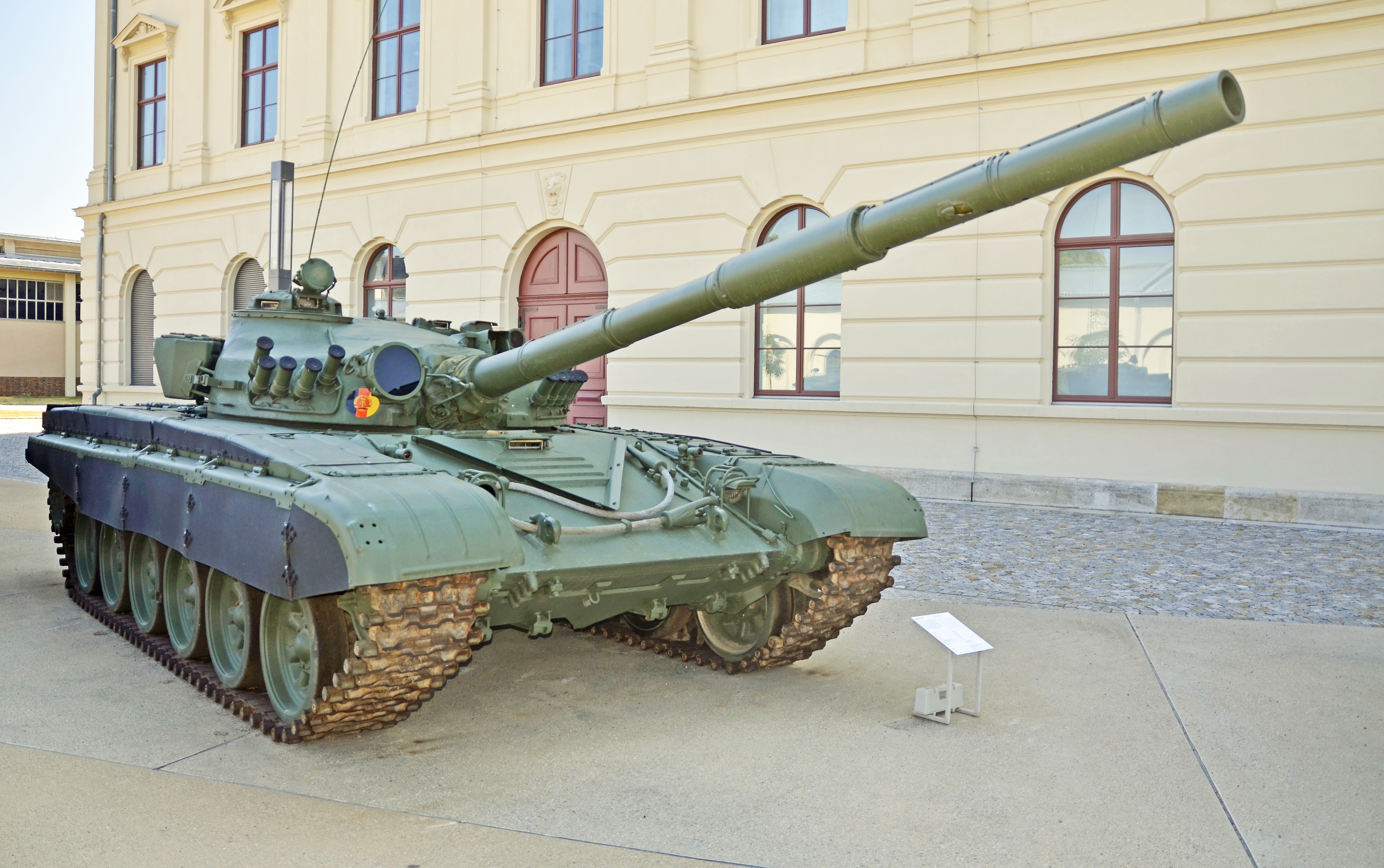
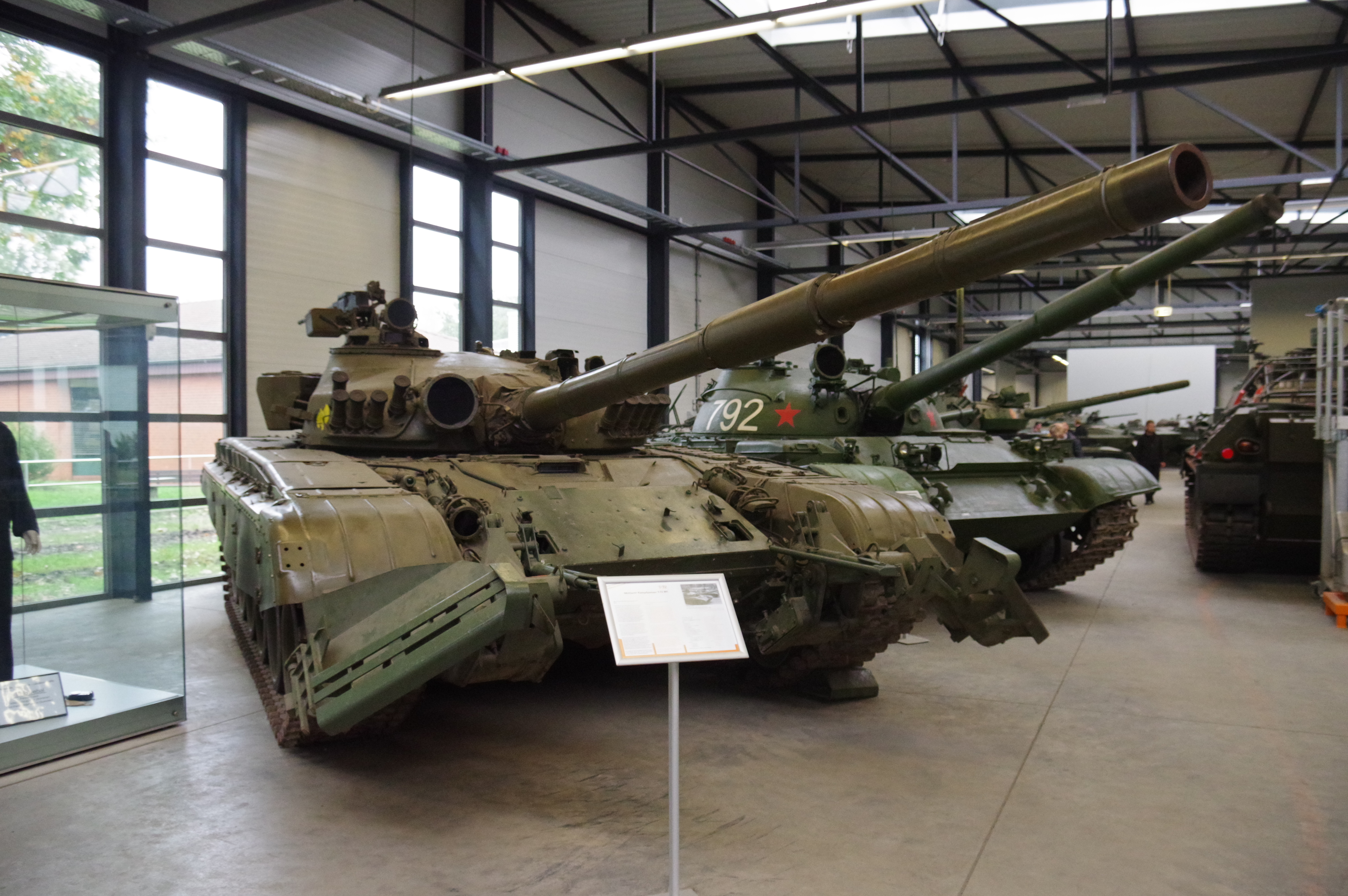
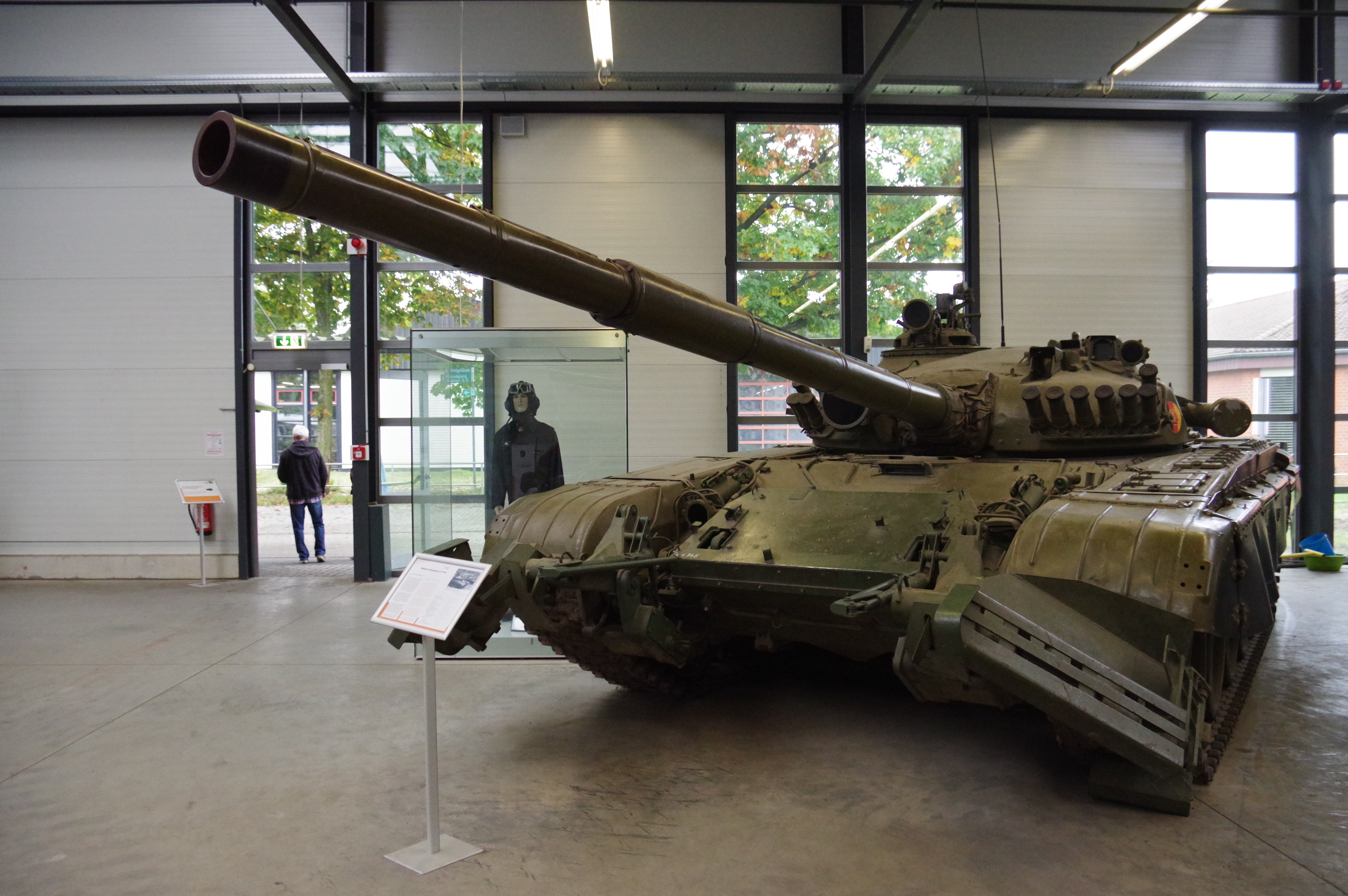
  East Germany – 35 T-72s (from USSR), 219 T-72s (from Poland and Czechoslovakia), 31 T-72Ms (from USSR), 162 T-72Ms (from Poland and Czechoslovakia) and 136 T-72M1s. 135 T-72S were ordered but none delivered before reunification. 75 T-72s were fitted with additional hull armour. Passed on to the unified German state
1. Germany – 549 tanks taken from the GDR's army, all scrapped, sold to other countries or given to museums.
- Eritrea – At least 1 captured in Eritrean-Ethiopian War. Current status unknown.
- Finland – Some 160–170 T-72M1s. About 70 T-72M1s (one armoured brigade) were bought from the Soviet Union and were delivered in 1984, 1985–1988 and 1990. A further 97 T-72M1s (including a small number of command versions T-72M1K and T-72M1K1) were bought from German surplus stocks in 1992–1994. All withdrawn from service in 2006. Scrapped in Jyväskylä or sold as spares to the Czech Republic. At least two Finnish T-72s are still in working order and have been used in showcases.
- Islamic State in Iraq and the Levant – Several were captured from the Syrian army.
- Kenya – 33 T-72M1 possibly ordered by South Sudan from Ukraine, but seized by Kenya after being held ransom en route by Somali pirates in 2008. Returned later to South Sudan.
- Libya – 150 in 2003.
- North Macedonia – 30 T-72A and 1 T-72AK delivered from Ukraine in 1999. All tanks were donated to Ukraine in June 2022.
- Romania – 31 T-72Ms were bought from the USSR, and received between 1978 and 1979. Withdrawn from service (in long-term storage), 28 tanks are for sale (23 of them need repairs and five are operational).

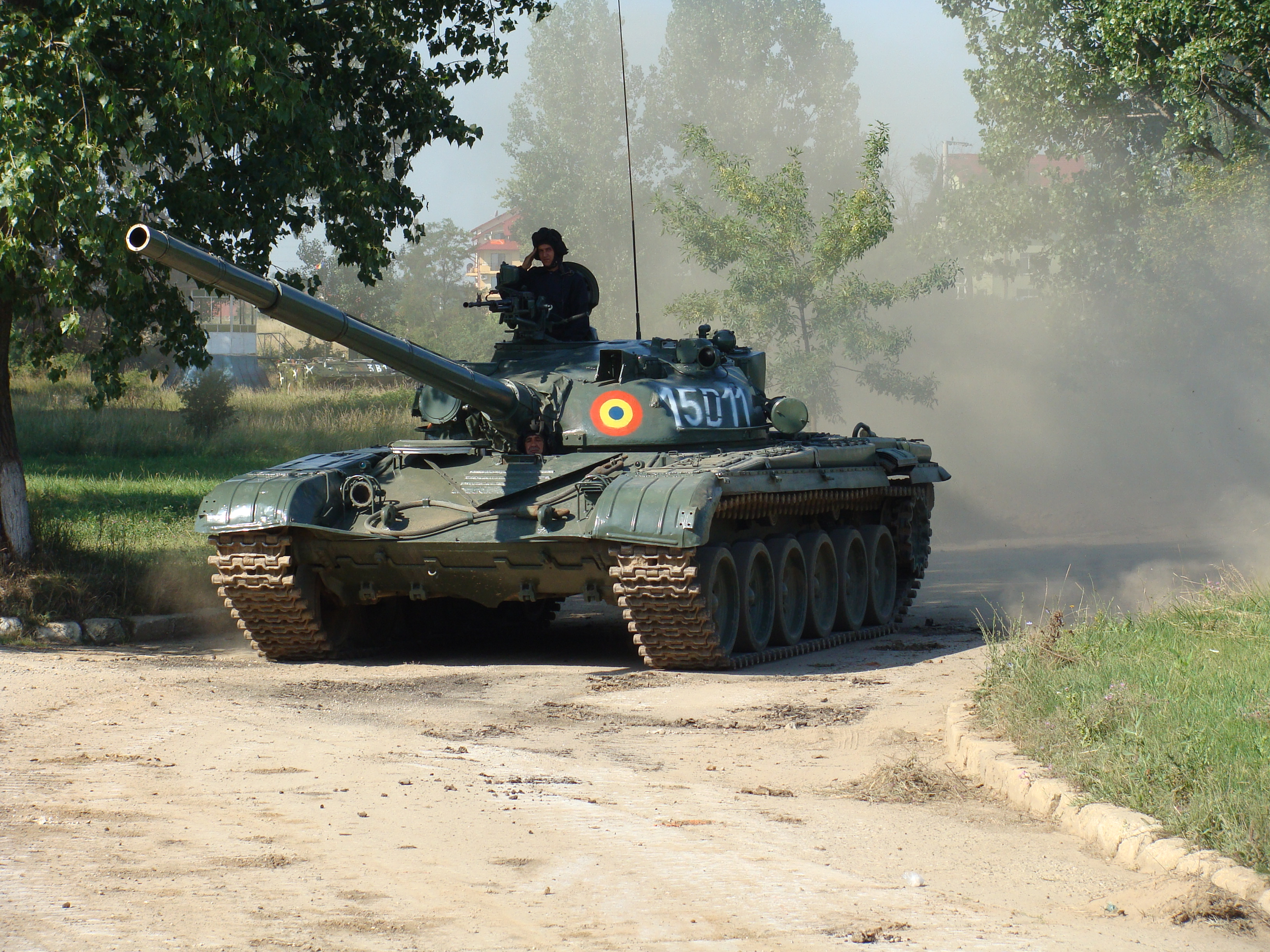
Ex-Romanian T-72M.

- Sierra Leone – In 1994 Sierra Leone acquired two T-72s from Poland via Ukraine (the vehicles were previously in Polish service). Another unspecified number of ex-Polish tanks was delivered to Sierra Leone in 1997 also via Ukraine (these vehicles also previously served with Poland).
- Syria – 1991 – 650 T-72A, T-72AV, T-72AVS, T-72S, T-72M, T-72M1, T-72M1M, T-72M1S, T-72B obr. 1989, T-72B3, T-72 Adra (a domestically improved version of the T-72M1 featuring slat and spaced armor, with later versions also including the "Sarab" active protection system.) and T-72 Shafrah
- Soviet Union – Passed on to successor states:
1. Russia – 10,284
2. Belarus – 1,797
3. Ukraine – 1,044
4. Turkmenistan – 702
5. Kazakhstan – As of 2026 has 350 in storage
6. Azerbaijan – 325
7. Armenia – 246
8. Georgia – 219
9. Kyrgyzstan – 150
10. Tajikistan – As of 2026 38
11. Uzbekistan – Exact Unknown, Estimates show 70-100
12. Lithuania – 398 all units transferred to Russia in 1993
13. Latvia – 114, all units transferred to Russia in 1994
14. Moldova – 0, no Soviet divisions stationed in Moldova fielded T-72s
- Tigray Defense Forces − Surrendered to the Ethiopian forces in the aftermath of the Tigray War.
- Yugoslavia – Bought approximately 18 T-72Ms from the USSR and 72 from Czechoslovakia, later developed the improved M-84.

== Failed bids ==
- Indonesia – Interest was expressed in obtaining multiple T-72 units to serve as the army's main battle tank, but the Leopard 2 was ultimately chosen as the main battle tank of the Indonesian National Armed Forces; one Indian Army T-72 that had been prepared to be sold to Indonesia was instead purchased by Russia in 2024.

== Variants ==
=== Soviet Union and Russia ===
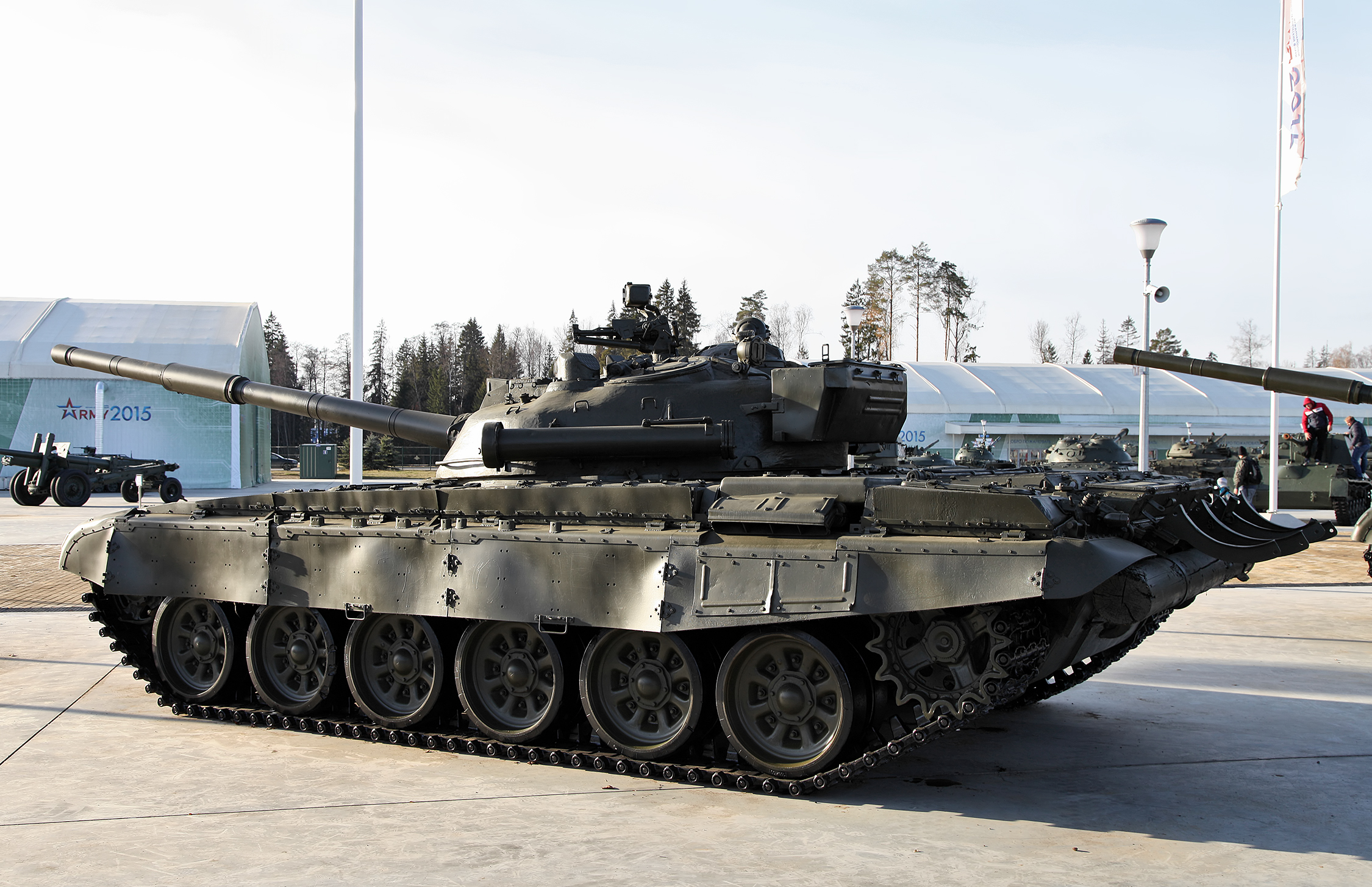
Early T-72 in profile.

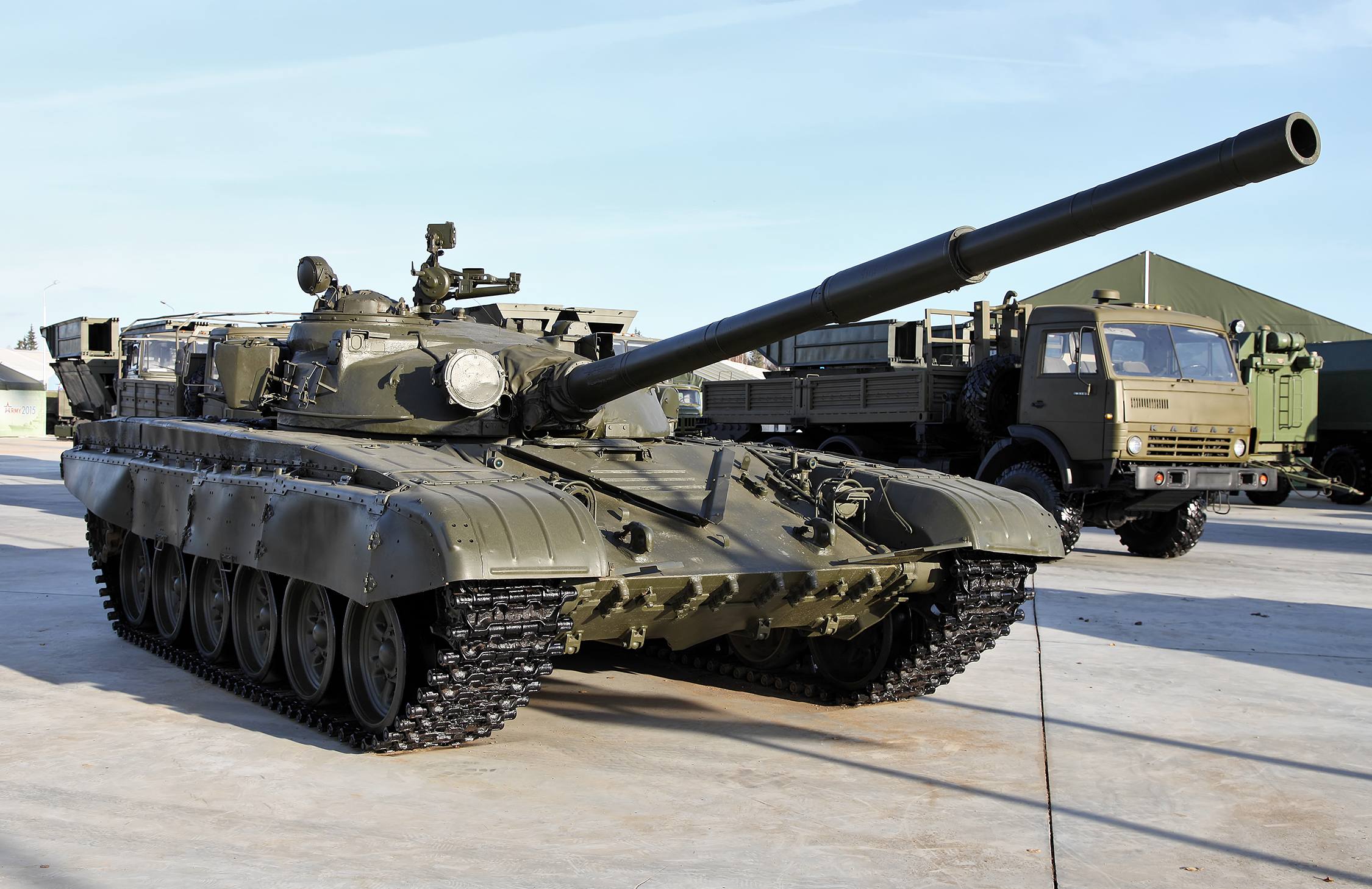
Early upgrade of T-72 Ural

The T-72 was designed and first built in the Soviet Union.

- T-72 "Ural" (Ob'yekt 172M) (1973): Original version, armed with the 125 mm D-81TM smoothbore tank gun. Unlike the later versions it had the searchlight mounted on left. It also had flipper-type armour panels. It had the TPD-2-49 coincidence rangefinder optical sight protruding from its turret.

- T-72K: Command version of the T-72 "Ural" with an additional R-130M radio. Company command versions were fitted with two additional R-123M/R-173 radios and also carried a 10 m telescopic mast. Battalion and regiment command versions were fitted with two additional R-123M/R-173 radios and the R-130M that used the 10 m mast when it was erected. In NATO code, the T-72K was represented by three different designations: T-72K1, T-72K2 and T-72K3 which represented the company command version, battalion command version and regiment command version.
- Robot-2: Remote controlled T-72 "Ural".
- Ob'yekt 172-2M "Buffalo": Modernization of the T-72 made in the early 1970s. The angle of the front armour slope was changed to 30 degrees. 100% metal side skirts protecting sides of the hull, added armour screens protecting the turret, ammunition storage increased to 45 rounds, modified suspension, added smoke grenade dischargers (SGDs), engine power boosted to 840 hp (630 kW).
- T-72 "Ural-1" (Ob'yekt 172M1) (1976): new 2A46 main gun, new armour on the turret.

- T-72A (Ob'yekt 172M-1) (1979): An improved version of the basic T-72 "Ural". Large numbers of early-production T-72 "Ural" models were modernized in the 1980s. Searchlight has been placed on the right-hand side of turret, blanking off the TPD-2-49 coincidence optical rangefinder and replaced by the TPD-K1 laser rangefinder, added plastic armour track skirts covering the upper part of the suspension with separate panels protecting the sides of the fuel and stowage panniers instead of the flipper-type armor panels used on the T-72 "Ural", the turret front and top being heavily reinforced with composite armour better known by its US codename – "Dolly Parton", an electronic fire control system, MB smoke grenade launchers, flipper armour mount on front mudguards, internal changes, and a slight weight increase.

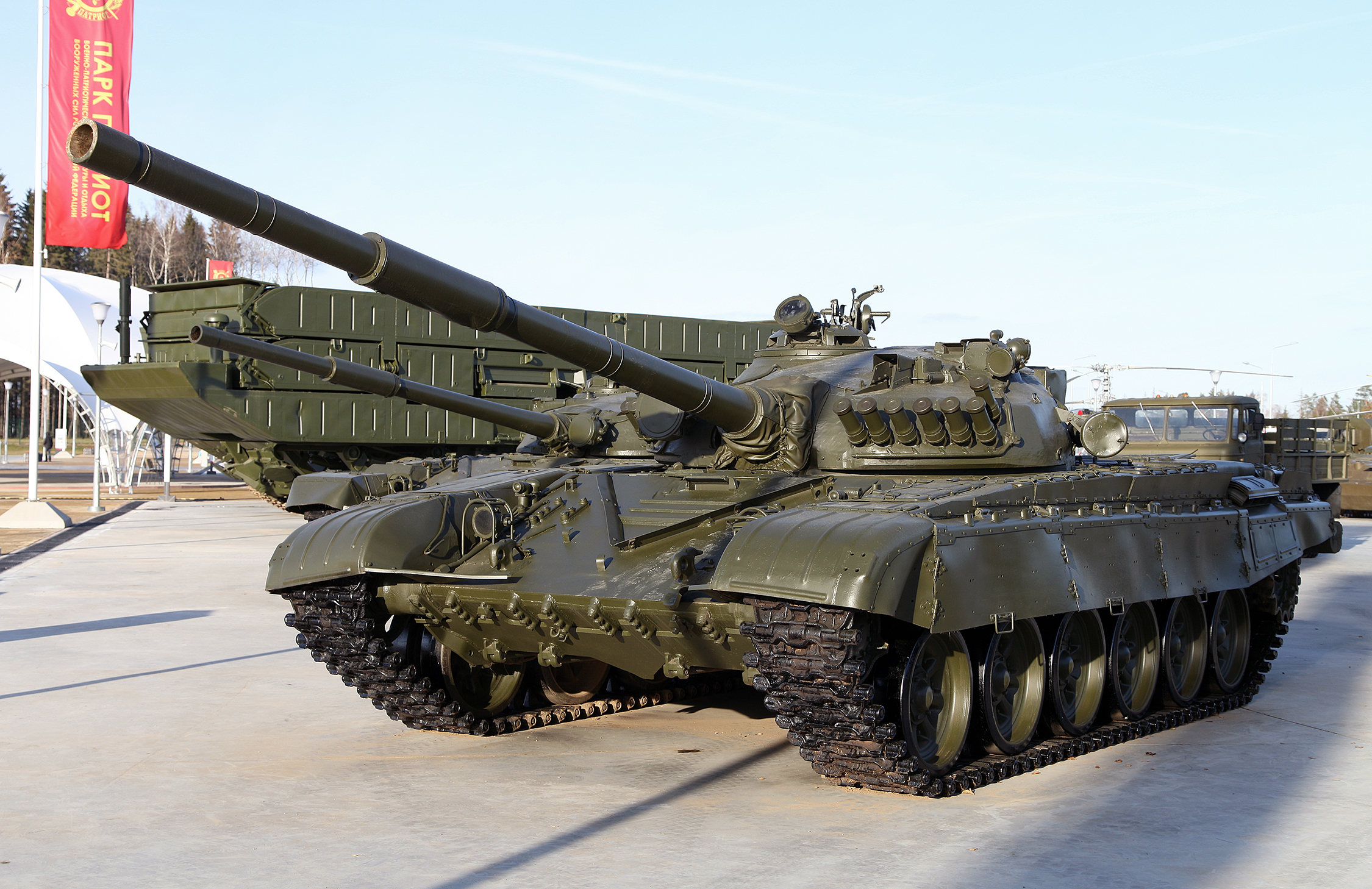
T-72A

- T-72A obr.1982g: Additional glacis armour with thickness of 16 mm of high resistance steel.
- T-72A obr.1984g: Late production with new turret, new gunner night sight 1K13-49, new engine. Smoke launchers on the turret side.
- T-72AK (Ob'yekt 176K): Command version of the T-72A. In NATO code T-72AK was represented by three different designations: T-72AK1, T-72AK2 and T-72AK3, which represented the respective command versions for companies, battalions and regiments.
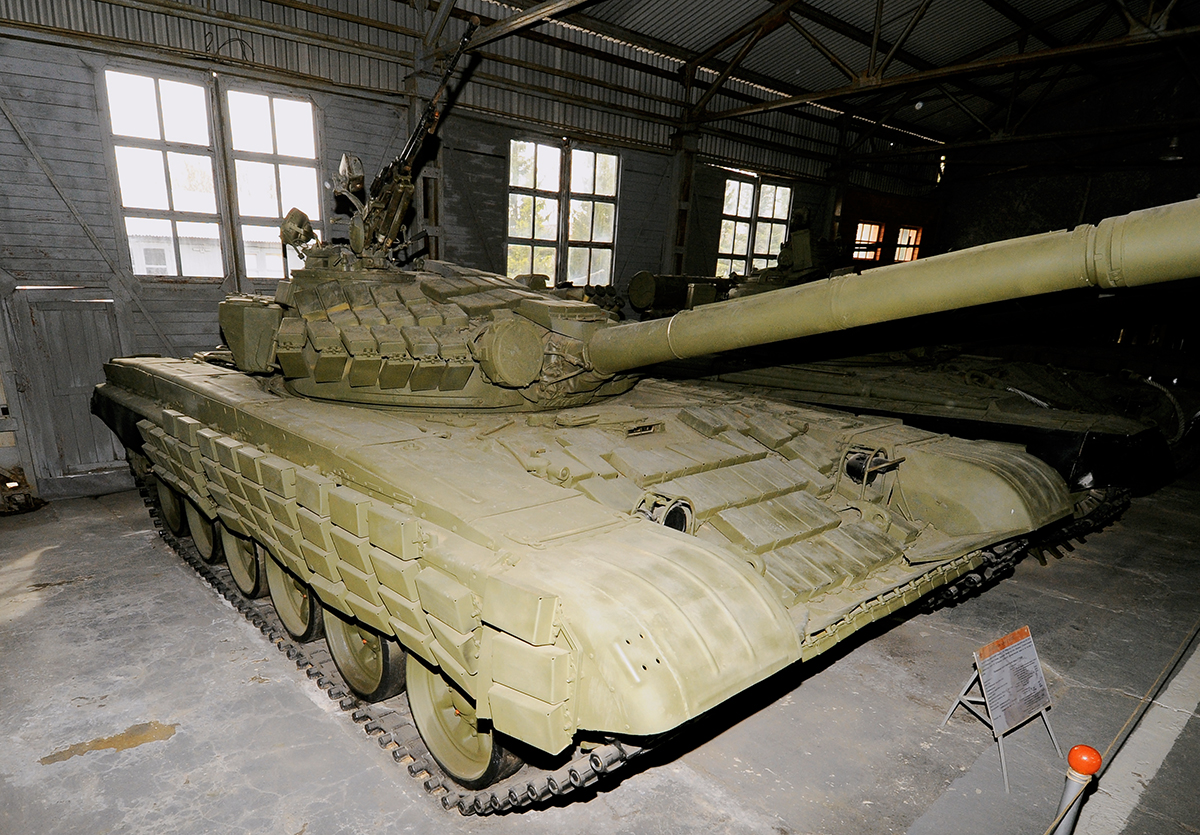
- T-72AV
  T-72AV: ("V" for vzryvnoi – explosive) model with Kontakt-1 explosive reactive armour fitted to hull front and turret.

- T-72M (Ob'yekt 172M-E2, Ob'yekt 172M-E3, Ob'yekt 172M-E4): Soviet export version, similar to the T-72A but with thinner armour and 125 mm D-81T smoothbore tank gun with 44 rounds. It was sold to Iraq and to Syria and was also built in Poland by Bumar-Łabędy. and Czechoslovakia.

- T-72MK (T-72M(K)): Export version of T-72AK. It is a command vehicle for battalion commanders and has additional radio equipment, including the R-130M radio, AB-1-P/30-M1-U generator and a TNA-3 navigation system. The main external difference is a 10 m telescopic antenna stowed under the rear of the stowage box during travel. An additional antenna base for this telescopic antenna is mounted on the left side of the turret. Because of the additional equipment, the number of rounds for the 125 mm tank gun had to be lowered from 44 to 38. In NATO code, the T-72MK was represented by three different designations: T-72MK1, T-72MK2 and T-72MK3, which represented the respective command versions for companies, battalions and regiments.

- T-72M-E (Ob'yekt 172M-E): Soviet export version armed with the 125 mm D-81T smoothbore tank gun with 44 rounds.

- T-72M fitted with a French 155 mm F1 turret for trials in India.
- T-72M fitted with a British 155 mm Vickers T6 turret for trials in India.

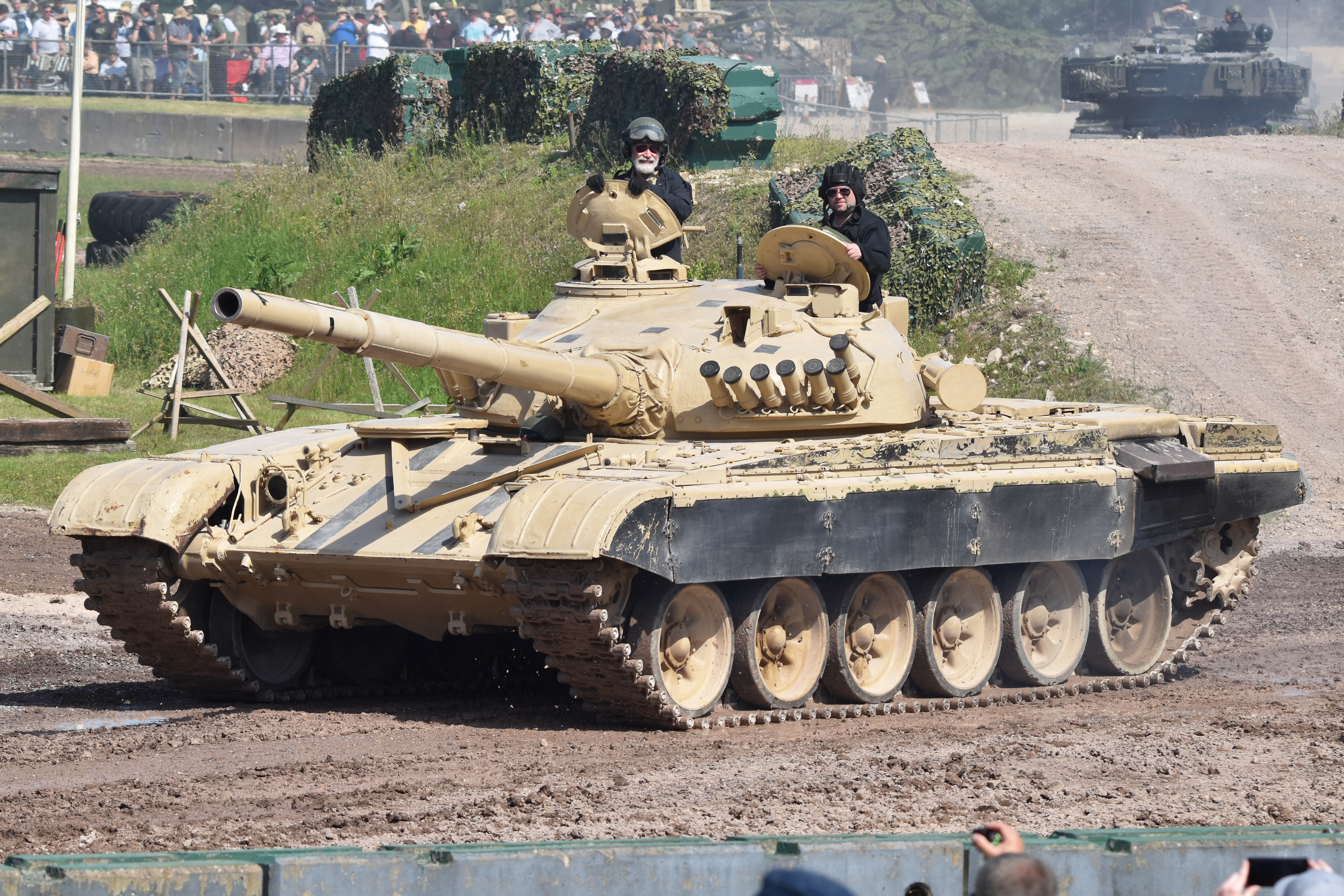
T-72M1

- T-72M1 (Ob'yekt 172M-E5, Ob'yekt 172M-E6): Soviet export version, with thicker armour and similar to T-72A obr.1979g. It is also fitted with 7+5 smoke grenade dischargers on turret front. It was also built in Poland and ex-Czechoslovakia.

- T-72M1K: Commander's variant with additional radios.
- T-72M1V: T-72M1 with Kontakt-1 explosive reactive armour ("V" for vzryvnoi – explosive).

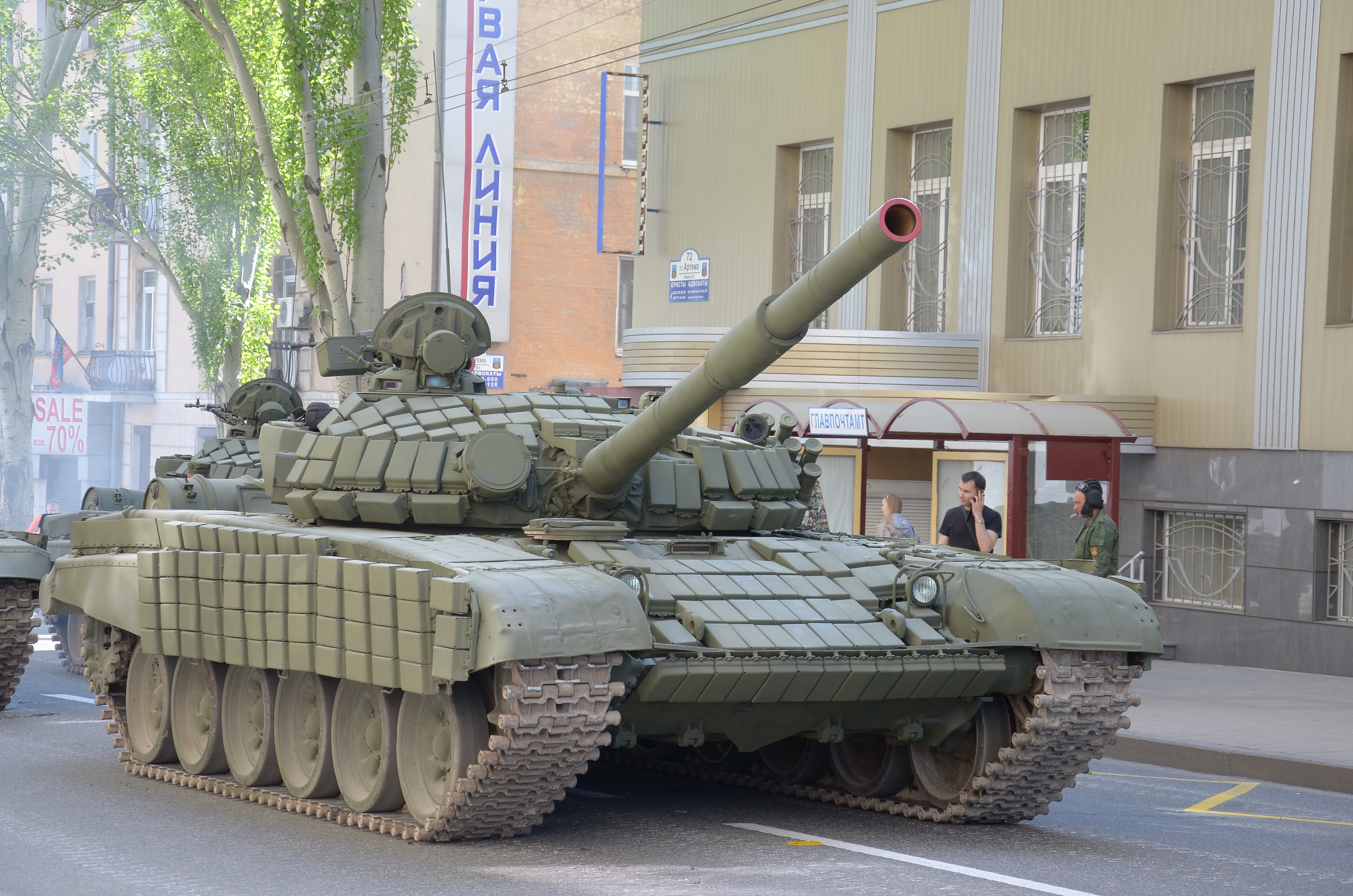
T-72B

- T-72S "Shilden" (T-72M1M1, Ob'yekt 172M-E8): T-72B export version with only 155 ERA bricks, simplified NBC system, no anti-radiation lining etc.

- T-72B (Ob'yekt 184) (NATO code: SMT M1988): (1985) (SMT – Soviet Medium Tank) Equipped with the new 2A46M main gun with a new 2E42-2 stabilisation system. There is a much improved version of 1A40-1 fire control system, a 1K13-49 gunner's sight, which allows the use of 9M119 Svir gun-launched anti-tank guided missile. Thicker armour, 20 mm of appliqué armour on the front of the hull, front and top of the turret were heavily reinforced with composite armour better known by its US codename "Super Dolly Parton". New V-84-1 engine with 840 hp (626 kW). On early models, the smoke dischargers were mounted on the turret front (as on the T-72A), later they were grouped on the left side of the turret to prepare for the installation of ERA bricks.

- T-72BK (Ob'yekt 184K): Command version of the T-72B, recognisable by having multiple radio antennas and a radio mast stowage under the rear turret bin.

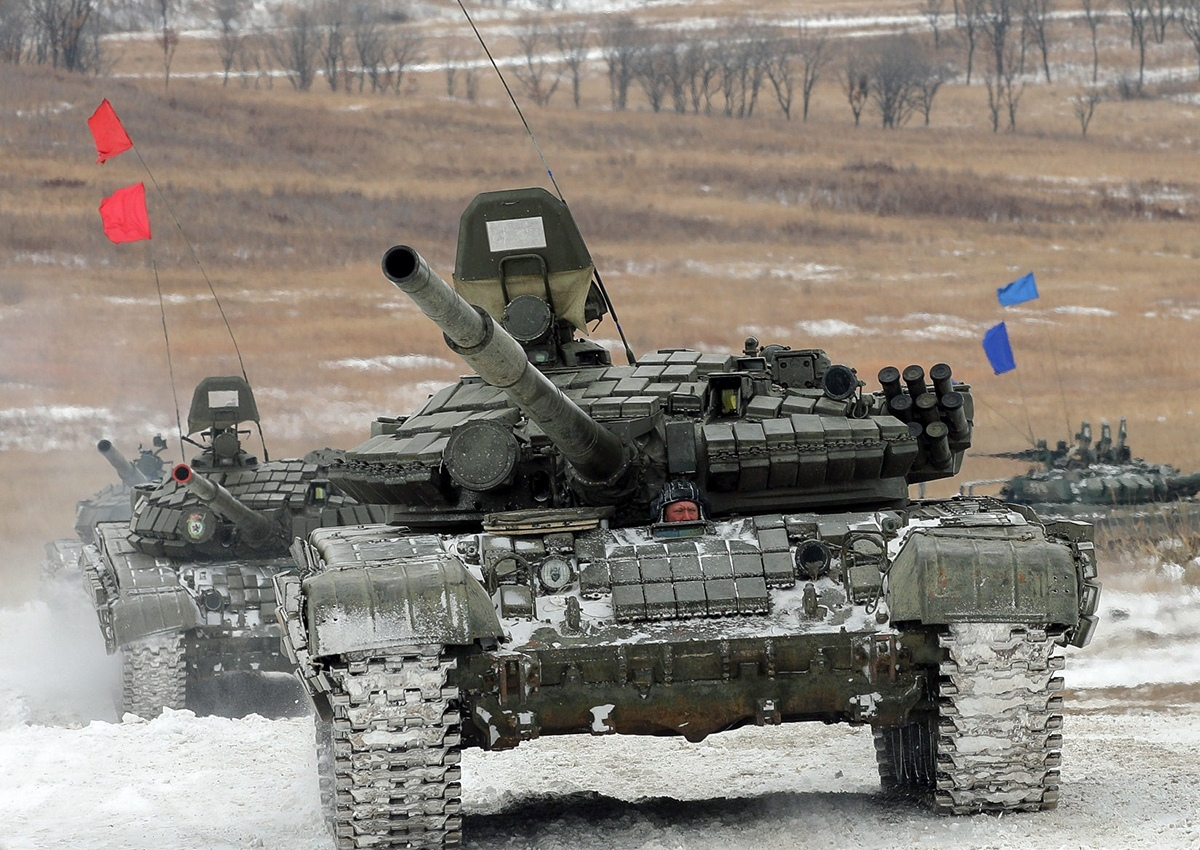
T-72AV with 2 T-72B and a T-72B3 in the background

- T-72BA (Ob'yekt 184A/A1): this designation is used to refer to several models of late T-72B, stripped down, refurbished and upgraded with certain core components at Uralvagonzavod between 1998 and 2005. There are several features common to all upgraded T-72BA models; front of the turret and front of the hull reinforced with Kontakt-5 ERA, the frontal floor plate reinforced against mines, the driver's seat is now suspended from the ceiling instead of being fixed to the floor and the driver's station has a new steering system as well as a new TVN-5 night sight. These tanks are equipped with the V-84MS engine using an upgraded exhaust system and newly developed twin-pin tracks (used on the T-90A). The upgrade also included the integration of a DWE-BS wind sensor whose mast is located on the rear, left part of turret and which feeds information into the 1A40 fire control system automatically. Tanks upgraded after the year 2000 received an improved 1A40-01M fire control system which makes use of a TBV digital ballistic computer. The tanks can also fire the 9M119M Refleks laser-guided anti-tank missile through the use of a 1K13-49 sight. The most recent T-72BA tanks made in 2005 feature the latest iteration of the 1A40 FCS, designated 1A40-M2. While the upgraded tanks retained the original 2A46M main gun, more importantly, they received a much improved 2E42-4 stabilization system which significantly improved accuracy – especially during firing on the move. Approximately 750 tanks were upgraded to the T-72BA standard.

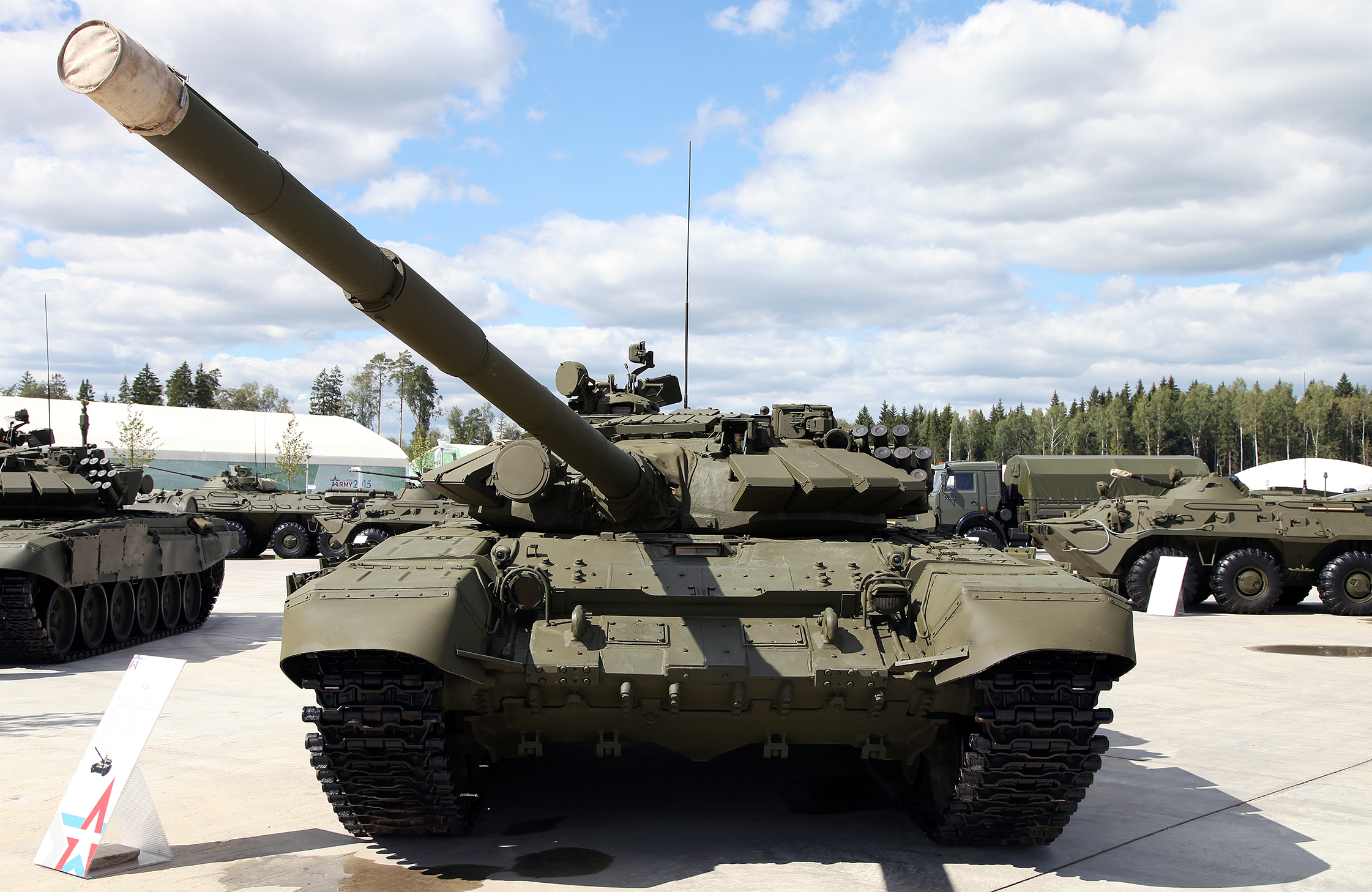
T-72B obr.1989 with Kontakt-5 ERA.

- T-72B1 (Ob'yekt 184-1): T-72B without the 9K120 missile system.

- T-72B1K (Ob'yekt 184K-1): Command version of the T-72B1.

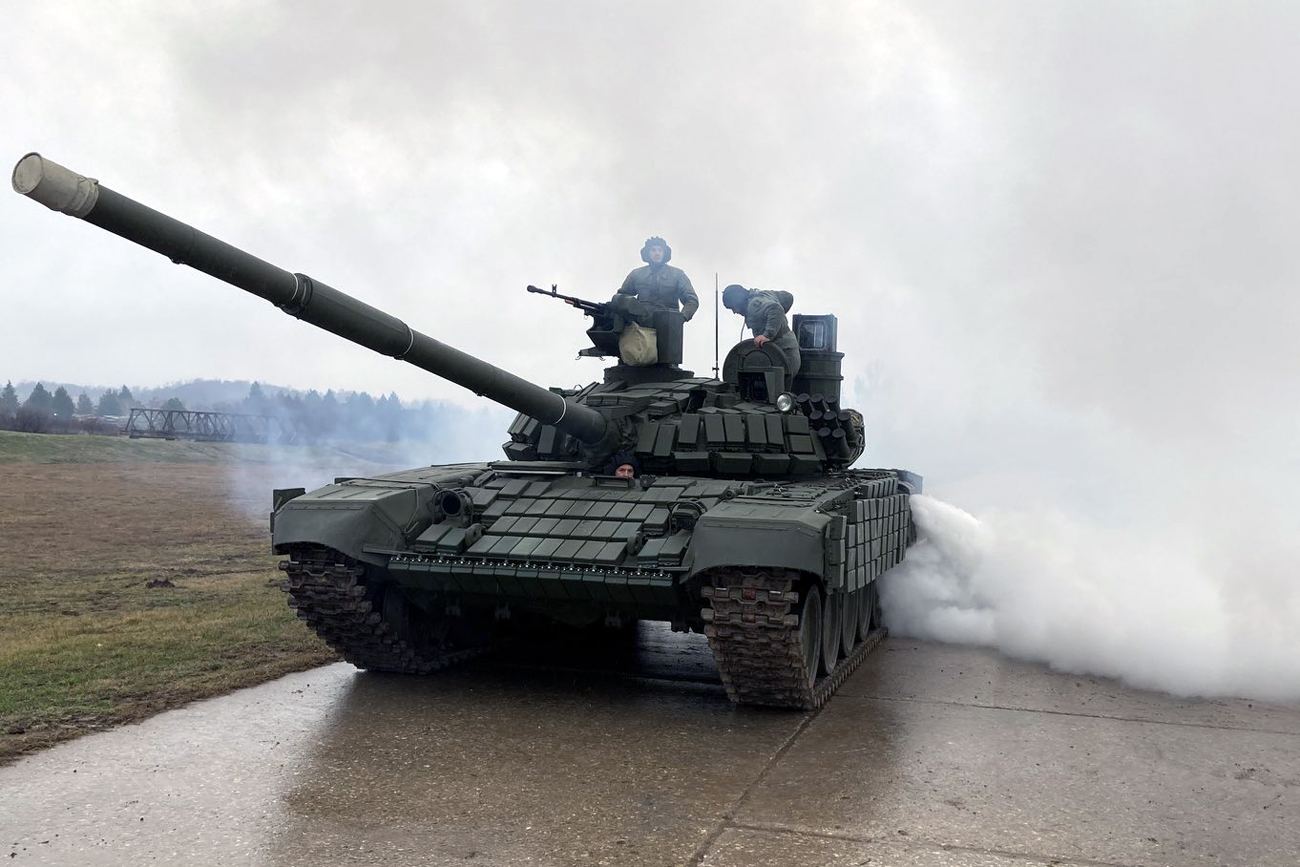
Serbian T-72B1MS "White Eagle"

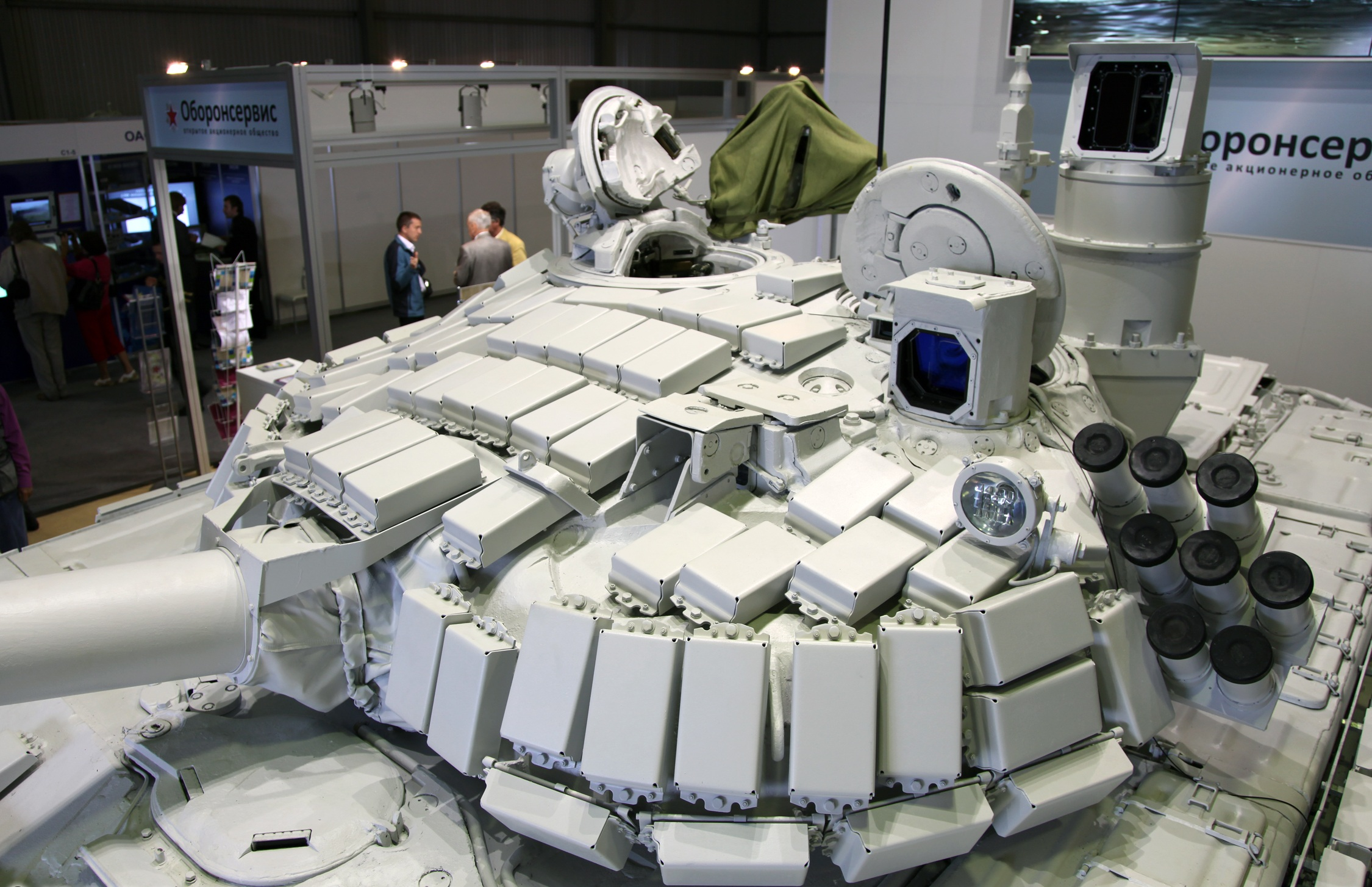
T-72B1MS "White Eagle" technology demonstrator; clearly visible are "Eagle's Eye" panoramic sight and Sosna-U gunner sight.

- T-72B1MS "White Eagle"(Ob'yekt 184-1MS): T-72B1 modernized by the 61st armour repair factory (today part of the Uralvagonzavod group), first unveiled at the Engineering Technologies 2012 forum, painted all white, hence the unofficial nickname "White Eagle". The protection of the tank is unchanged, with the Kontakt-1 explosive reactive armour being retained, and the cannon is unchanged. A modernised V-84MS engine is installed, but its power output is the same as the older one. An auxiliary power unit is added. The electronics are heavily upgraded, including a rear camera for the driver, a GPS/GLONASS navigation system, a "Falcon's Eye" third generation panoramic thermal sight for the commander, a Sosna-U thermal gunner sight, an automatic target-tracking system, a chassis management system, a meteorological mast, and the capability to use 9M119 Svir/Refleks barrel-launched ATGMs. Lastly, a Kord remotely controlled AA machine gun is added. These improvements increase the weight from 44.1 to 47.3 tonnes. Currently (2019) in service with Laos, Nicaragua and Serbia

- T-72B obr.1989g: T-72B equipped with advanced Kontakt-5 explosive reactive armour, composite armour in sides of turret as well. Often called T-72BM or T-72B(M) but this is not correct. NATO code: SMT M1990.
- T-72B obr.1990g: Additionally fitted with new FCS, crosswind sensor and sometimes V-92S2 engine.

- T-72B obr.1990g with an improved commander's cupola with a larger sight.

- T-72B2 Rogatka obr.2006g (Ob'yekt 184M) (also referred to as T-72BM in documents): T-72B upgrade proposal code-named Rogatka. First shown at the 2006 Russian Arms Expo, it was equipped with a new fire-control system including a Sosna-U thermal sight, and a new 125 mm 2A46M-5 main gun. The autoloader was replaced with the model found on the T-90A, and allowed for the use of longer, more modern ammunition. A new V-92S2 1,000 hp diesel engine was added. The new Relikt third-generation ERA replaced the Kontakt-5 ERA on the front of the tank, while slat armour was added on the flanks. TShU-1-11 laser warning receivers were placed on the turret front. The prototype was shown equipped with the Nakidka camouflage kit. The price of this modernisation was deemed too high, and it was not serially produced. However, some of its features were used in the T-72B3 modernisation package.

- T-90 (Ob'yekt 188) – A further development of the T-72, incorporating many features of the heavier, more complex T-80. It was first called upgraded T-72B(Усовершенствованный танк Т-72Б)

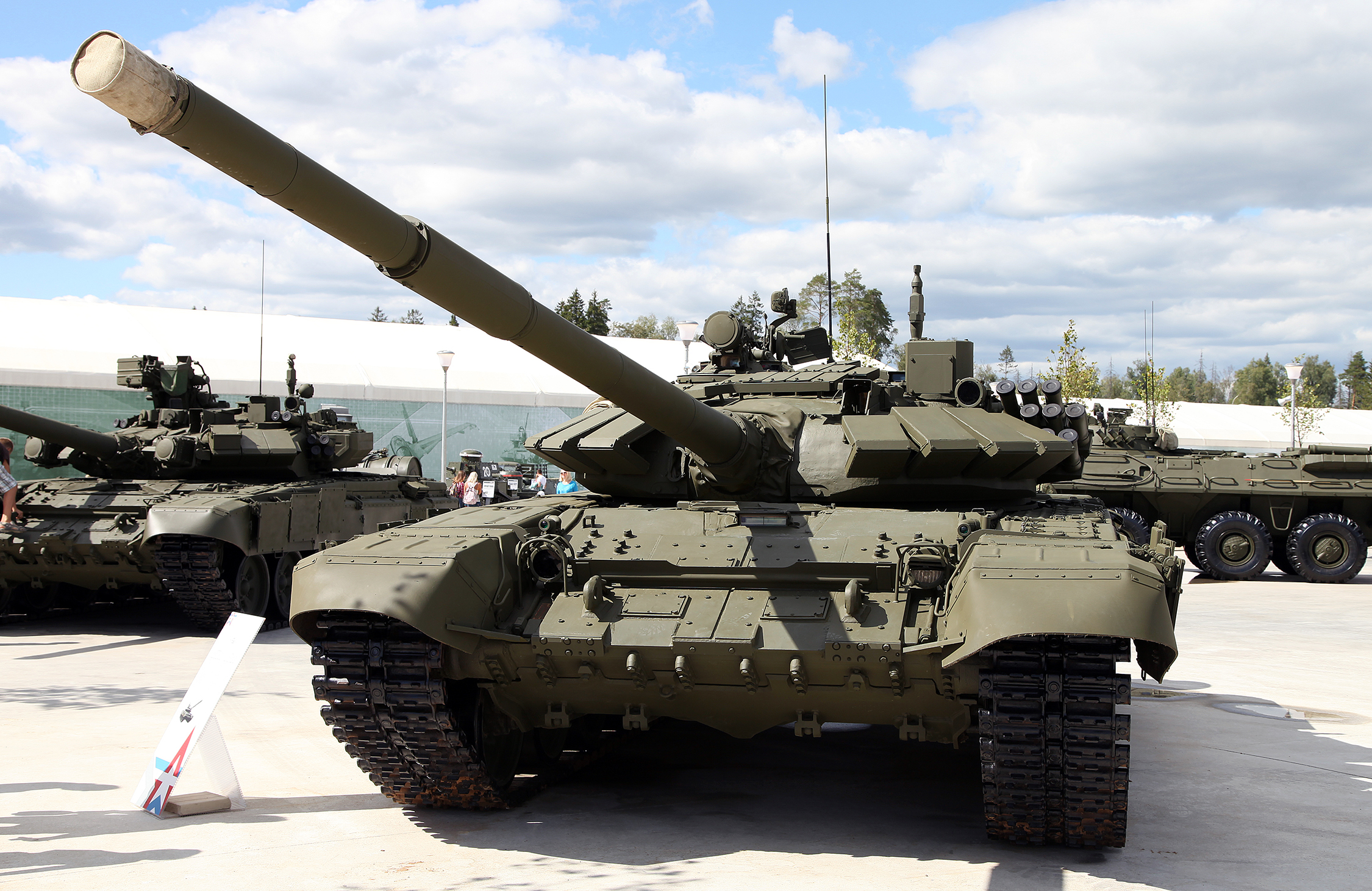
The recent T-72B3 in Russian service. Most obvious is the new Sosna-U multi-spectral panoramic sight.

- T-72B3 (Ob'yekt 184-M3): this upgrade was initiated in 2010 using old stocks of T-72B tanks held in reserve. The purpose was to upgrade old T-72s to use the same gun, ammunition, ATGM, ERA etc. as the new T-90A tanks to simplify supply lines. In addition to performing a general overhaul of every vehicle, all tanks were equipped with the more powerful V-92S2 engines and a new steering system in the driver's compartment, and older tracks were replaced with the new universal, twin-pin design. The upgrade program focuses mainly on the implementation of a new fire control system. The tank commander retains an upgraded version of the legacy TKN-3MK sight, which is a passive device with a range of only 600 m at night. The commander also has a separate monitor that displays thermal imagery from the gunner's main sight, and a new turret control panel. The gunner has the new PNM Sosna-U panoramic multi-spectral sensor, which replaced the 1K13 night vision in its mounting; the 1A40-4 FCS with TPD-K1 sight is retained, but as part of the auxiliary sighting system to complement the newer system. The Sosna-U is a multi-channel, panoramic sight stabilized in both vertical and horizontal axes with a built-in laser rangefinder and command guidance module, used with 9M119M missiles. The main advantage of the Sosna-U is the Thales Catherine-FC thermal imager, which extends the detection range of a tank-sized target to 10,500 m and the identification range to 3,300 m in both day and night conditions and all weathers. The T-72B3 series vehicles also received the new 2A46M-2 main gun which is reportedly equivalent to the Rheinmetall Rh120 L/44 cannon. The gun-laying and stabilization drives were also replaced by the new 2E42-4 system, and the AZ ammunition auto-loader was modified to accommodate newer generations of 125 mm smoothbore anti-tank ammunition: Vant (depleted uranium) and Mango (tungsten) rounds. There is also a new 9K119 Refleks system, used to launch 9M119 Refleks ATGM through the gun barrel. The B3 upgrade includes a new explosion- and fire-suppression system and an advanced VHF radio system designated R-168-25U-2 AKVEDUK. The variant entered service on 19 October 2012. It was first delivered to the 20th Field Army in summer 2013, and to its Armored Guards Brigade in October 2013. About 2,000 such tanks were in service as of 2020. The cost to upgrade a T-72 to the T-72B3 standard was around 52 million rubles in 2013.

- T-72B3 obr.2014: a special version of the T-72B3, first seen during the 2014 edition of the Tank Biathlon competition. The most notable upgrades are the stabilized, panoramic, independent PK-PAN commander sight with integrated thermal viewer and a V-92S2 1,000 hp engine.

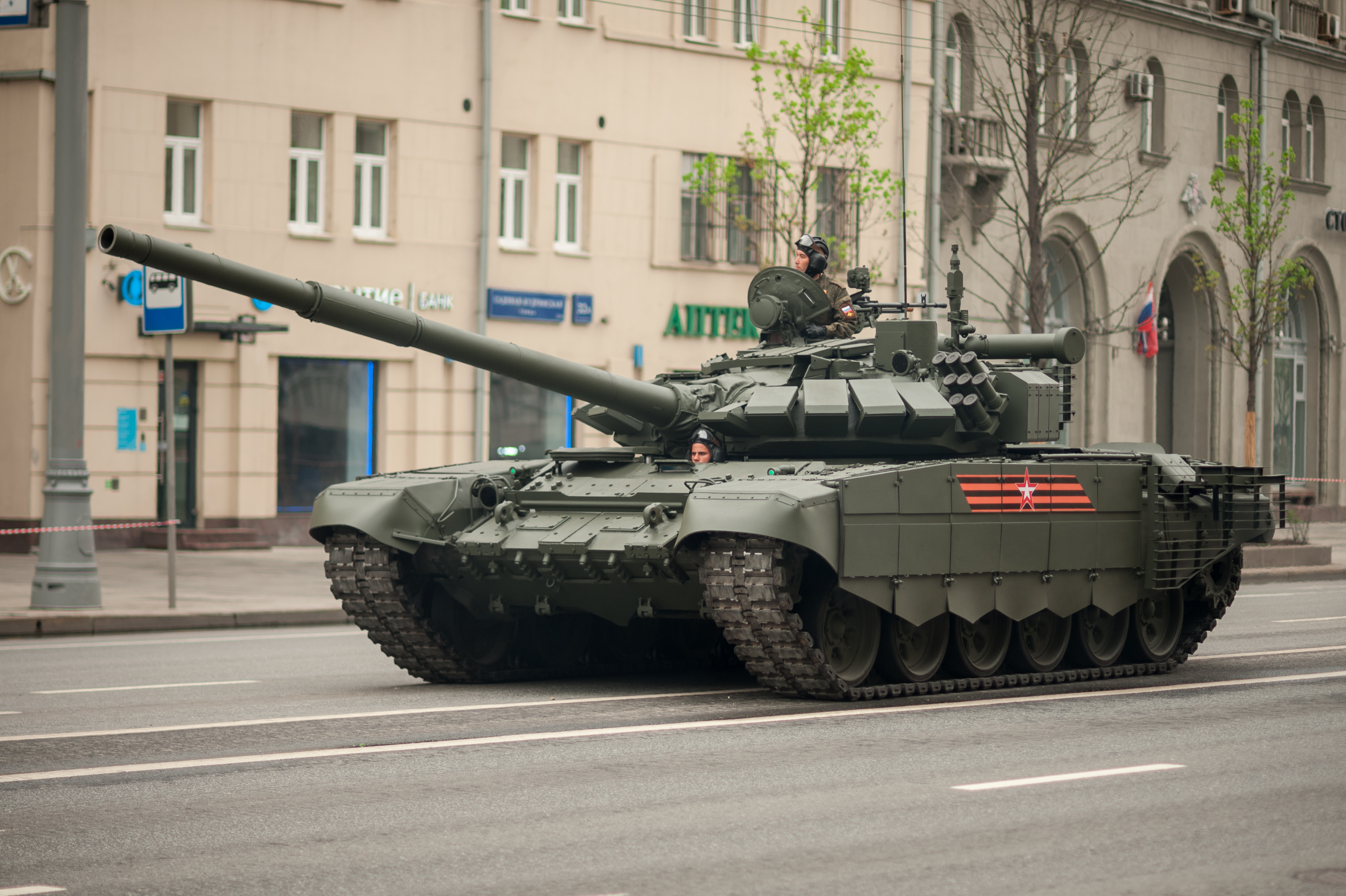
T-72B3M obr.2016

- T-72B3M obr.2016: a further upgrade of the T-72B3, produced since 2016 by overhauling and upgrading old T-72B tanks from storage. The purpose was to use the same gun, ammunition, ATGM, ERA etc. as the T-90 M tank to simplify supply lines. There is a new gun 2A46M-5 with new anti-tank ammunition Svinets-1 (tungsten) and Svinets-2 (depleted uranium). New 2E58 gun stabilizer is responsible for improved aiming time. 9K119M Refleks-M system is used to launch 9M119M Invar (also called Reflex-M) ATGM through gun barrel. New PK-PAN panoramic commander sight with thermal vision only seen on a limited number of vehicles while all the rest are using older TKN-3MK commander's sight. Retained Sosna-U gunner's sight and crosswind sensor. New Kalina fire control system, although in simplified form. There is new radio communication equipment as well as GLONASS satellite navigation. Driver is using older TVN-5 periscope with additional display from rear view camera. The automotive performance of the tank was improved with a more powerful V-92S2F engine rated at 1,130 hp (830 kW) coupled to an automatic transmission system and improved drivetrain. Protection is improved by Relikt new generation ERA mounted on sides of both hull and turret, while cage armor was added to the rear. Kontakt-5 ERA is retained over the frontal arc and turret top. There is also increased protection against AT land mines. The Russian Defense Ministry ordered several hundred T-72B3M tanks, and received the first twenty in early 2017. The cost to upgrade a T-72 to the T-72B3 obr.2016 standard was around 78.9 million rubles in 2016.

- T-72B3A (2016): Previously described model T-72B3M obr. 2016 with Arena-M active protection system (APS) and Nakidka thermal tarp.
- Unmanned version of T-72B3M is (as of December 2018) under development.

- T-72B3M obr.2022: It is the most recent upgrade of the T-72B3, based on combat experience gained during the 2022 Russian invasion of Ukraine. New TKN-3TP commander`s sight with thermal vision (range 3000 m) is installed. New TVK-2 driver's dual channel sight (night vision 250 m). The tank is fitted with the same armament as the previous obr. 2016 model, however its protection has been enhanced. Previously, the back of the turret was without any additional protection and now there are metal boxes with Relikt explosive reactive armour (ERA). Lower parts of the turret are covered by a metal net designed to improve protection against rocket-propelled grenades, similar to that of the T-90M. Additional Kontakt-5 blocks installed right and left of the gun mantlet as well as on the turret top. The void in ERA coverage caused by the smoke grenade dischargers on the turret is now protected by Kontakt-1 ERA. Lower frontal hull plate is now covered with Kontakt-1 ERA. Relikt ERA plates are covering entire length of the chassis, fender/idler area and also attached to cage armor over engine compartment. Mechanism to open the armored protection panel for the Sosna-U sighting system is added, replacing the previous configuration which used bolts that had to be unscrewed manually before combat. Due to shortages, some tanks received a simpler 1PN96MT-02 thermal imaging sight instead of the Sosna-U multichannel stabilized sight.

- T-72B3M obr.2023: Modification to T-72B3M Obr. 2022, replacing side and rear slat armor with new ERA arrays. It is fitted with a standard roof armor cage. By the fall of 2023, Sosna-U sight shortages were resolved and became standard issue.

- T-72B3M obr.2024: Modification to T-72B3M Obr. 2023, with additional rubber and fabric screens on the rear of the turret.

- T-72B1 obr. 2023: mobilization model, produced by overhauling and upgrading existing 30+ years old T-72B and T-72BA tanks during regular maintenance in armor repair plants. The purpose was to unify different models in order to simplify supply lines. There is a brand new dual channel TKN-3TP commander's sight with thermal vision range 3000 m. New 1PN96MT-02 gunner's sight (thermal vision range 3500 m, laser rangefinder, ballistic computer) coupled with the old TPD-K1 sight (day channel, ATGM guidance, laser rangefinder 4000 m). Combination of Kontakt-5, 4S24 and Relikt ERA all-around vehicle copied from T-72B3M obr.2022. Anti-RPG net below the turret. These vehicles were made without crosswind sensor and Sosna-U sight because of increased production during the war. Everything else was upgraded to the level of basic T-72B3 (main gun 2A46M-2, gun stabilizer 2E42-4, fire control system 1A40-4, driver's sight TVN-5, steering system, twin-pin tracks, 1000 hp engine, frontal floor plate reinforced against mines, driver seat suspended from the ceiling).

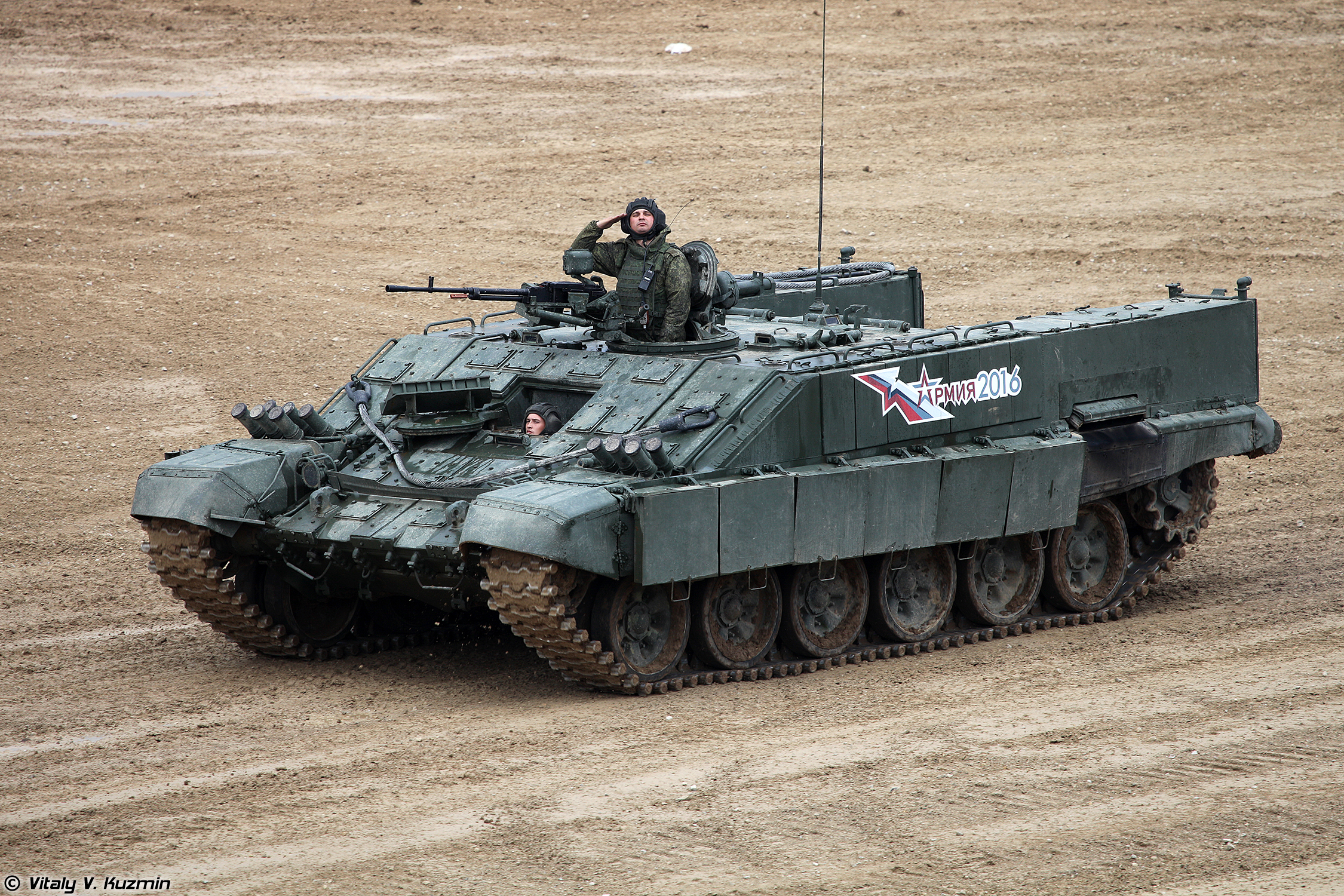
BMO-T

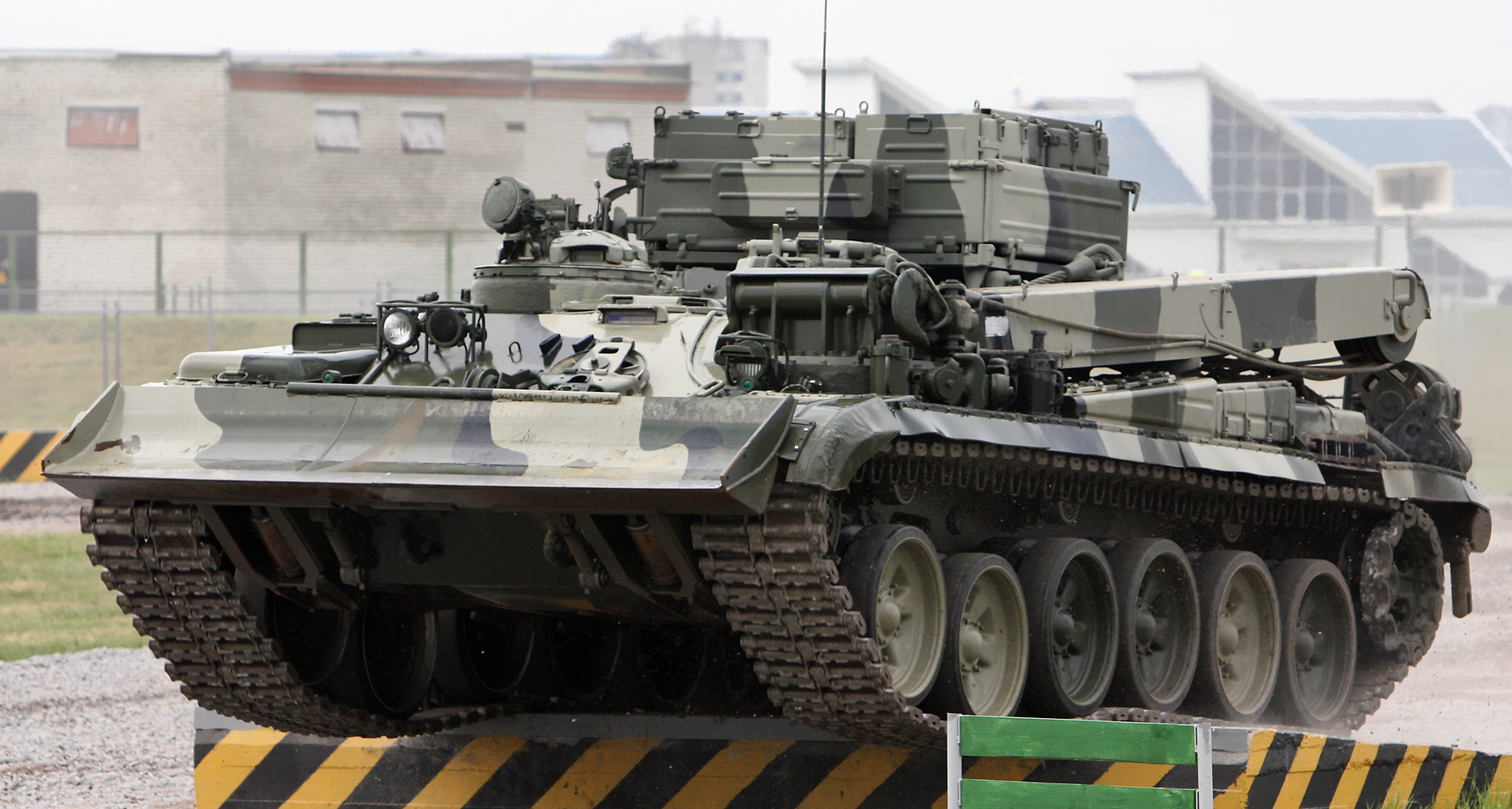
BREM-1

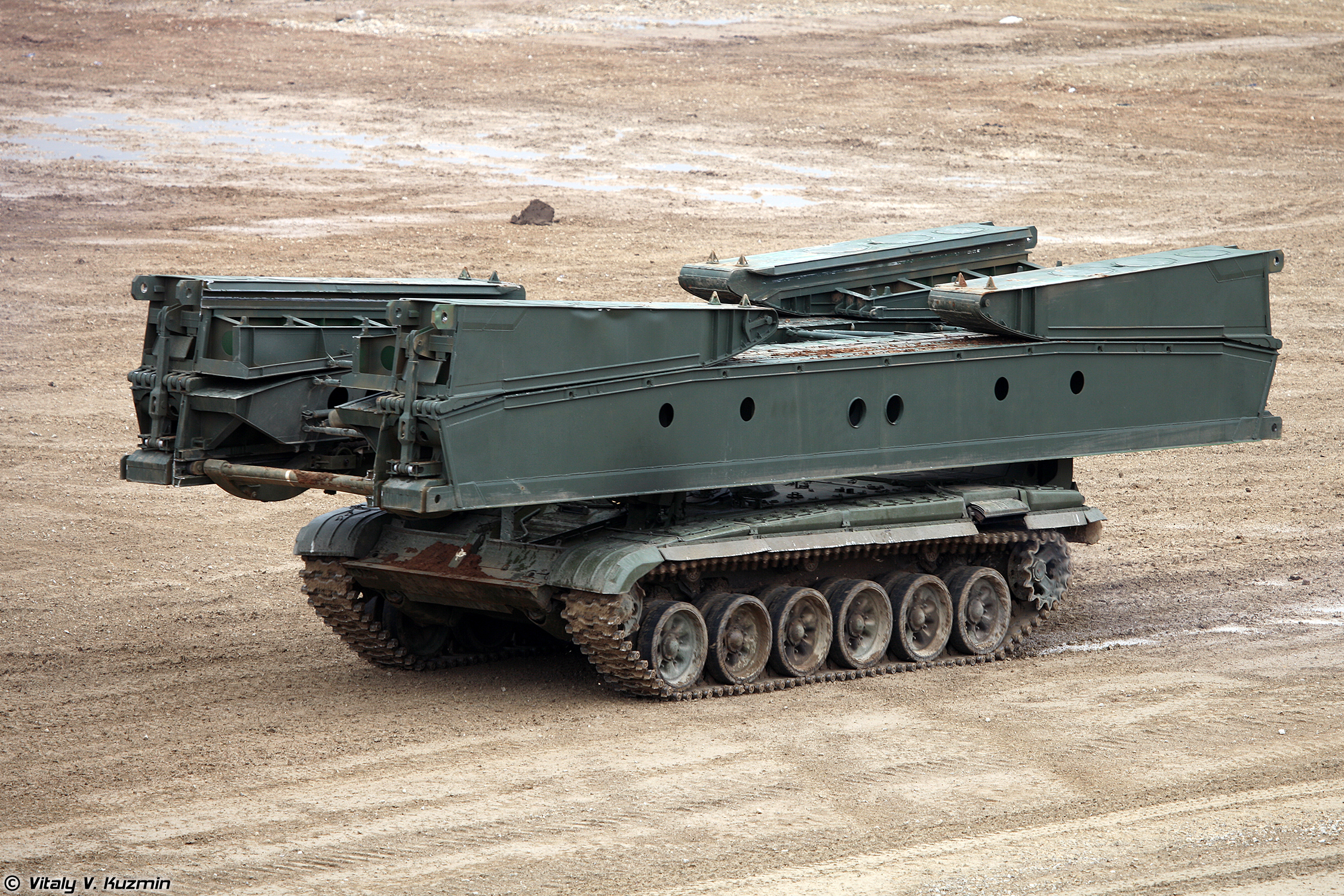
MTU-72

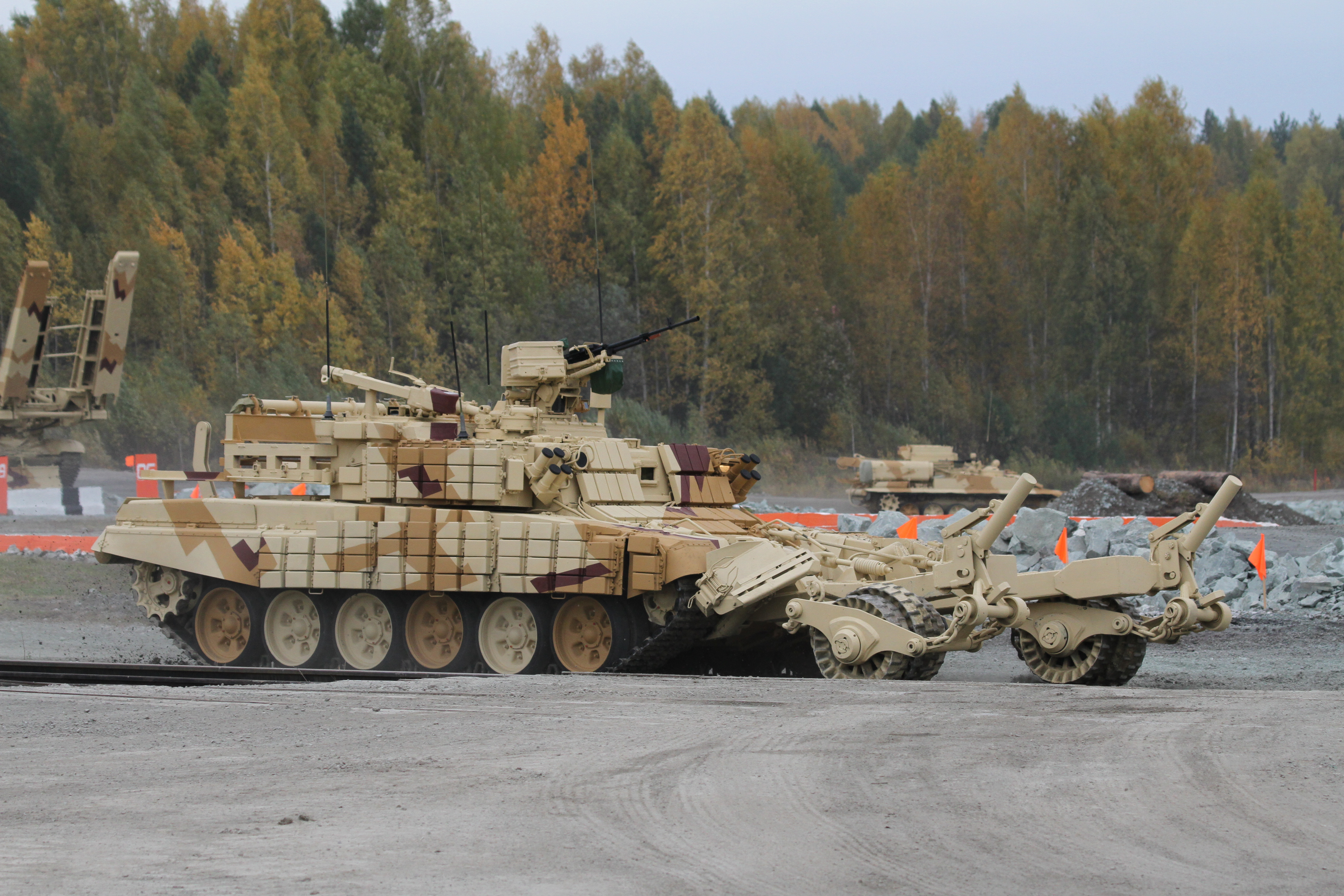
BMR-3M

- BMO-T (Boyevaya Mashina Ognemyochikov) – A transport vehicle for flamethrower-squads armed with RPO launchers. Entered service in 2001.
- BMPT (Ob'yekt 199) – Heavy convoy and close tank support vehicle (Boyevaya Mashina Podderzhki Tankov). All new turret armed with 2 × 30 mm 2A42 autocannons (500 rounds), 4 × 9M1201 Ataka-T ATGM and 7.62 mm PKT MG (2,000 rounds). It can be also fitted with 2 × AGS-30 automatic grenade launchers. Features new fire control system with thermal sights and a ballistic computer. Reinforced with 3rd generation "Relikt" ERA on the frontal armor and both sides of hull and turret, slat (cage) armor in the rear. It is equipped with Agat-MR night vision devices, an NBC detection and protection system. There is 902A "Tucha" 81 mm smoke grenade launcher array on each side of the turret and "Shtora-1" active protection system. When the screening system warns the crew of laser tracking, a smoke screen is created by the launch of grenades. The vehicle can be fitted with either the KMT-8 or the EMT mine clearing system. The term BMP-T that is very often found is not correct.
- TOS-1 – Large box-type multi-barrel rocket launcher with 30 tubes that replaces turret.
- TZM-T – Reloading vehicle for the TOS-1 mobile multi-barrel rocket launcher.
- BREM-1 (Bronirovannaya Remonto-Evakuatsionna Mashina) – Armoured recovery vehicle with a hydraulic crane with capacity of 12 tonnes mounted at the front of the hull on the left side. It also has a main winch with capacity of 25 tons which can be increased to 100 tonnes, auxiliary winch, hydraulically operated dozer/stabilizing blade at the front of the hull, towing equipment and a complete range of tools and recovery equipment.
- IMR-2 (Inzhenernaya Mashina Razgrashdeniya) – Combat engineering vehicle (CEV). It has a telescoping crane arm which can lift between 5 and 11 metric tons and utilizes a pincers for uprooting trees. Pivoted at the front of the vehicle is a dozer blade that can be used in a V-configuration or as a straight dozer blade. When not required it is raised clear of the ground. On the vehicle's rear, a mine-clearing system is mounted.

- IMR-2M1 – Simplified model without the mine-clearing system. Entered service in 1987.
- IMR-2M2 – Improved version that is better suited for operations in dangerous situations, for example in contaminated areas. It entered service in 1990 and has a modified crane arm with bucket instead off the pincers.
- IMR-2MA – Latest version with bigger operator's cabin armed with a 12.7 mm machine gun NSV.

- Klin-1 – Remote controlled IMR-2.

- MTU-72 (Ob'yekt 632) (Tankovyj Mostoukladchik) – bridge layer based on T-72 chassis. The overall layout and operating method of the system are similar to those of the MTU-20 and MTU bridgelayers. The bridge, when laid, has an overall length of 20 meters. The bridge has a maximum capacity of 50,000 kg, is 3.3 meters wide, and can span a gap of 18 m. By itself, the bridge weighs 6400 kg. The time required to lay the bridge is 3 minutes, and 8 minutes for retrieval.
- BMR-3 (Bronirovannaja Mashina Razminirovanija) – Mine clearing vehicle.
- RKhM-7 "Berloga-1" (Razvedivatel'naya Khimicheskaya Mashina) – NBC reconnaissance vehicle without turret and with fixed superstructure.
- Tsar Mangal (a.k.a. Turtle Tank), a makeshift armored vehicle with improvised armor and anti-drone protection, equipped with demining rollers. The first specimen was based on T-72.

=== Azerbaijan ===
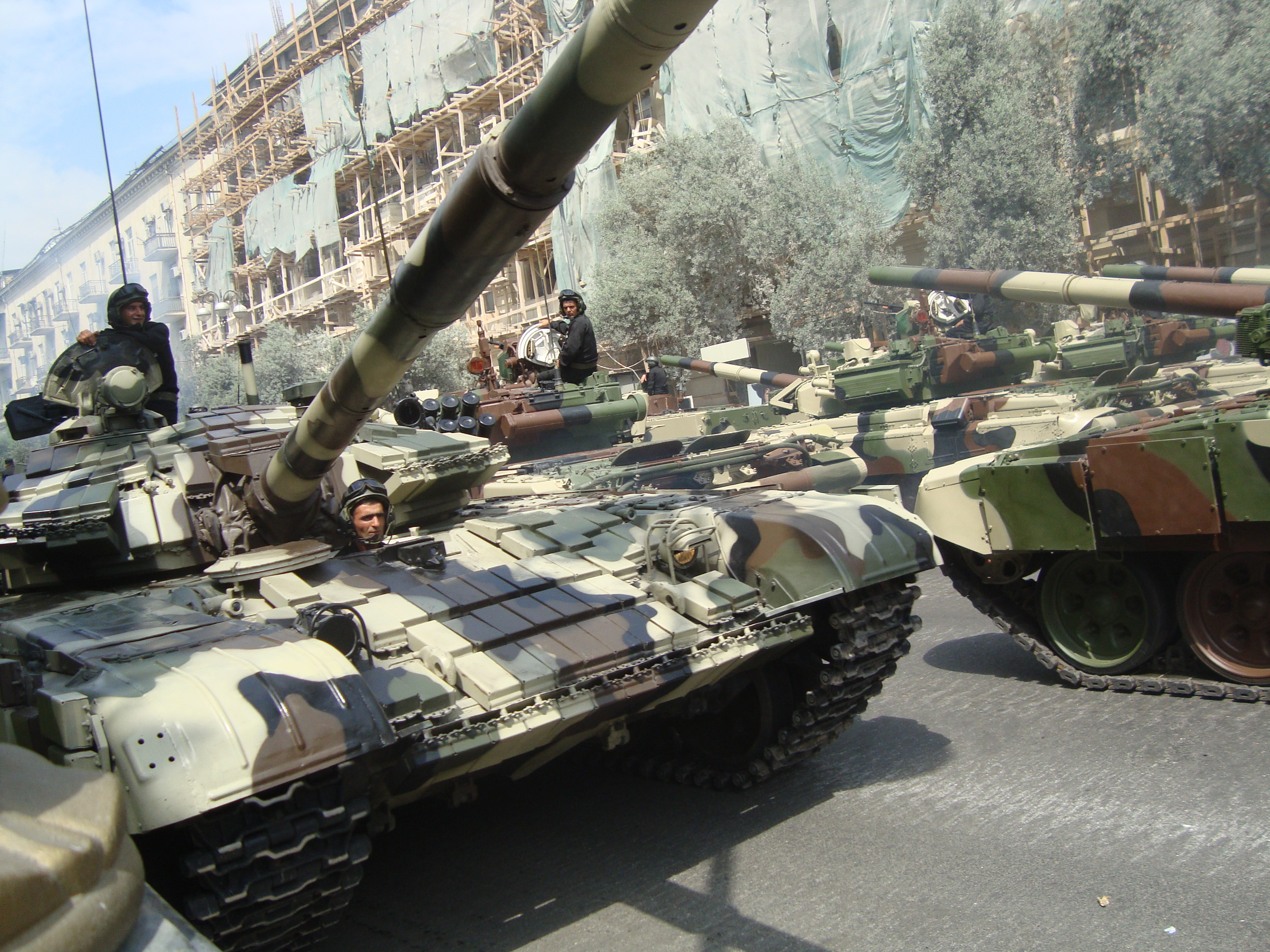
Azerbaijani T-72 Aslan.

- T-72A Aslan - Modernizated option of the T-72 by Azerbaijani Ministry of Defence Industry developed by the Israeli company Elbit Systems. The tank is equipped with a computerized control system, a GPS-based navigation system, a “friend or foe” determination system, thermal imagers for the commander and gunner, and a mounted remote sensing system.

=== Belarus ===
- T-72BM2 - Modernization of the T-72B. Deliveries started in April 2026 and continue.

=== Bulgaria ===
- T-72M2 – New night vision and thermal devices, anti-radiation cladding, rubber side skirts, C4I and IR suppression coating.
- T-72M1 Mod. 2022 – T-72M1 modernised with Elbit's Thermal Imaging Fire Control System, giving the gunner 3rd generation+ thermal imaging capabilities along with a new laser range finder capable of lasing up to 9 km away. The system also includes a battlefield management system, four laser warning receives, a new fire control system with a metrological sensor, new thermal sleeve for the 2A46 125 mm gun, and thermal night time cameras for the driver. The T-72M1 Mod. 2022 is also one of the few T-72s to receive an auxiliary power unit (APU) that allows the tank to have a "silent watch" capability, allowing it to operate all its system with the engine turned off to save fuel and reduce the tank's thermal emissions and acoustic signature. The tank was modernised locally at "Terem - Khan Krum" EOOD in Targovishte.

=== Croatia ===
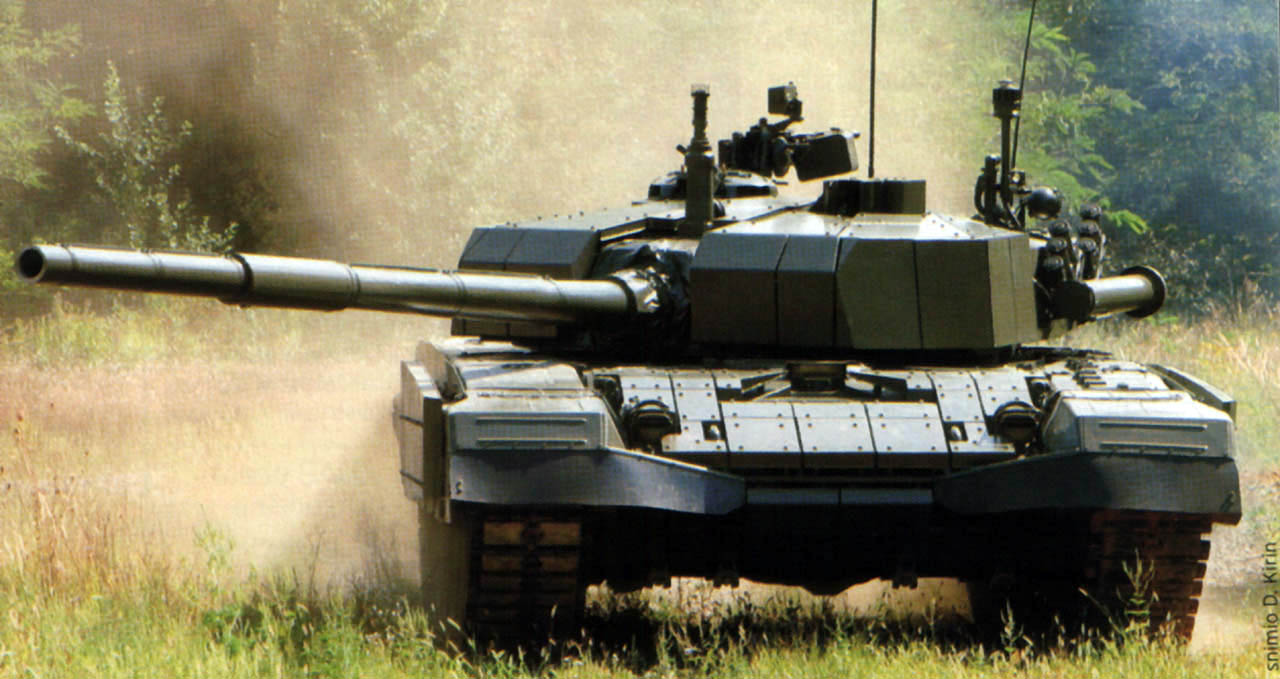
A Croatian Army M-95 Degman

- M-84A – The M-84 is a Yugoslav third generation main battle tank, based on the Soviet T-72, produced in Croatian Đuro Đaković specijalna vozila.
- M-84D – Proposed upgrade of the M-84A4 with technology developed for M-95 Degman prototype.
- M-95 Degman – 3rd generation prototype tank based on the Yugoslav M-91 Vihor prototype.

=== Czechoslovakia ===
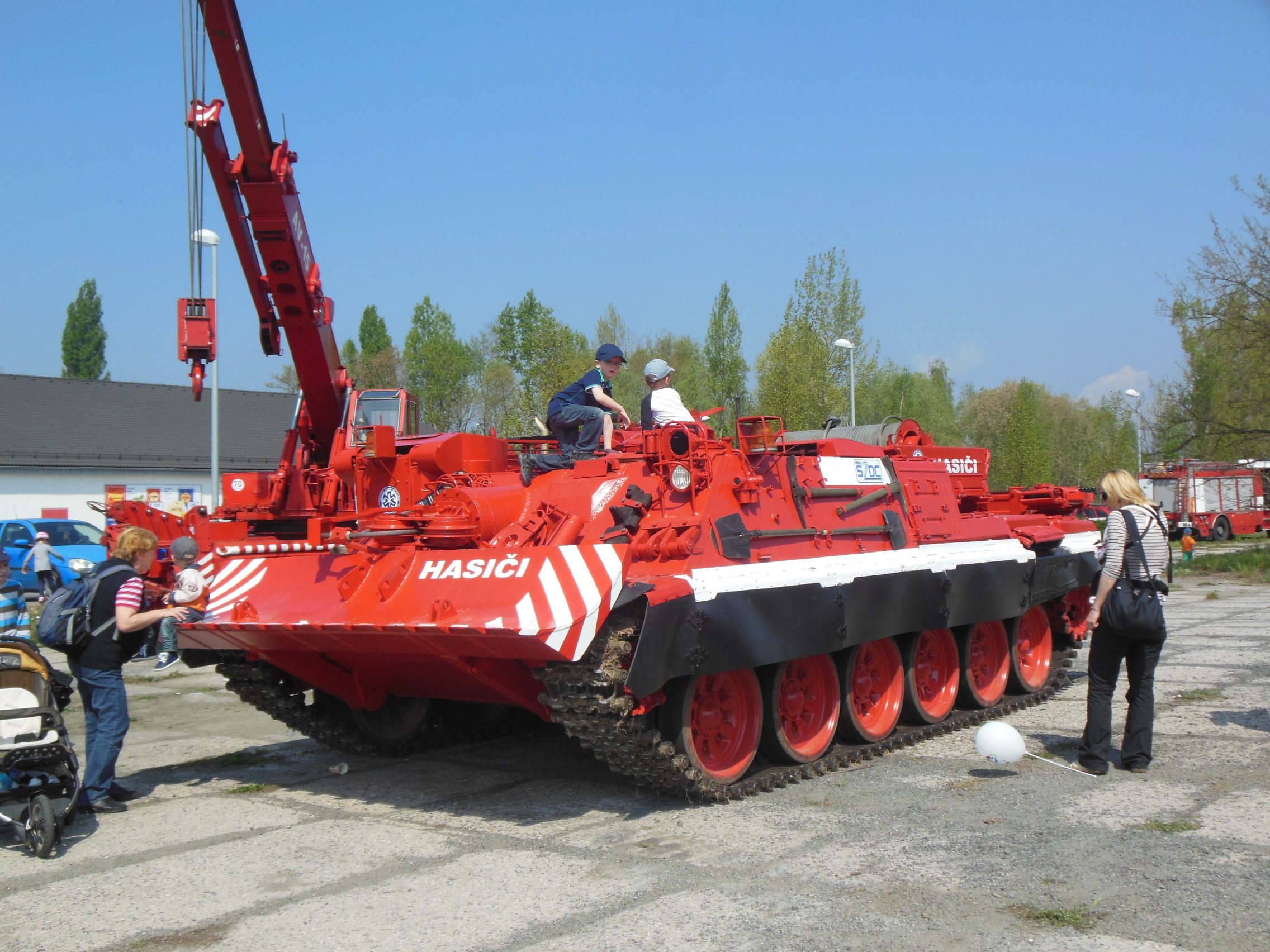
VT-72B in firefighting services

- T-72M (Ob'yekt 172M-E3) (1985) – This model was built under licence by ZŤS Martin (nowadays Slovakia). In Western sources it is often referred to as T-72G which might be the designator for the version exported to the Middle East. In the late 1980s the tanks produced for the Czechoslovak army and for export as well were fitted with some improvements from the Soviet T-72A programme, including rubber side skirts (instead of "gill armour") and 902B "Tucha" smoke grenade launchers.

- T-72M1 (Ob'yekt 172M-E5) (1986) – This export version of the T-72A was also built by ZŤS. An external difference with the Soviet original is the reduced number of KMT mounts on the lower glacis plate.
- VT-72 (BRAM-72) (vyprošťovací tank) – Czechoslovak armoured recovery vehicle (ARV) based on T-72 chassis.

- VT-72B (BRAM-72B) – Czechoslovak ARV based on BREM-1 with dozer blade with prominent rams mounted on the front of the vehicle, hydraulic crane on the right side of vehicle and a large built-up superstructure at the front of the hull with a large tackle block in front of it.

=== Czech Republic ===
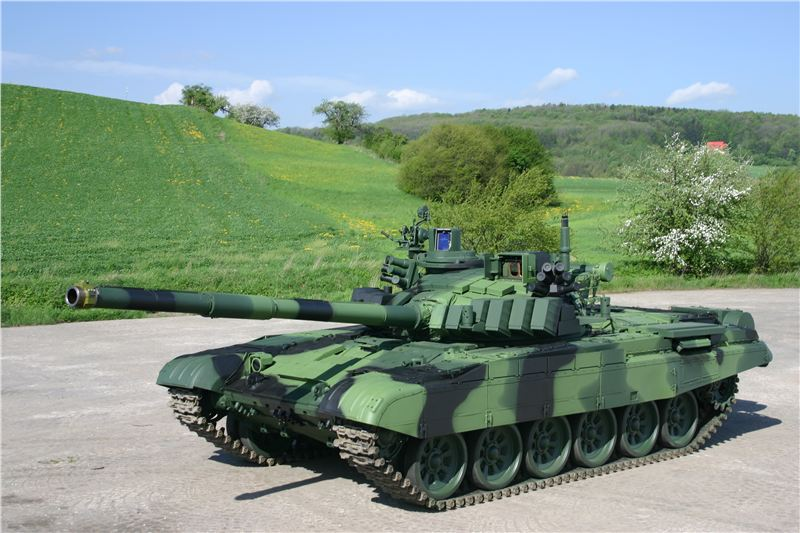
T-72M4 CZ

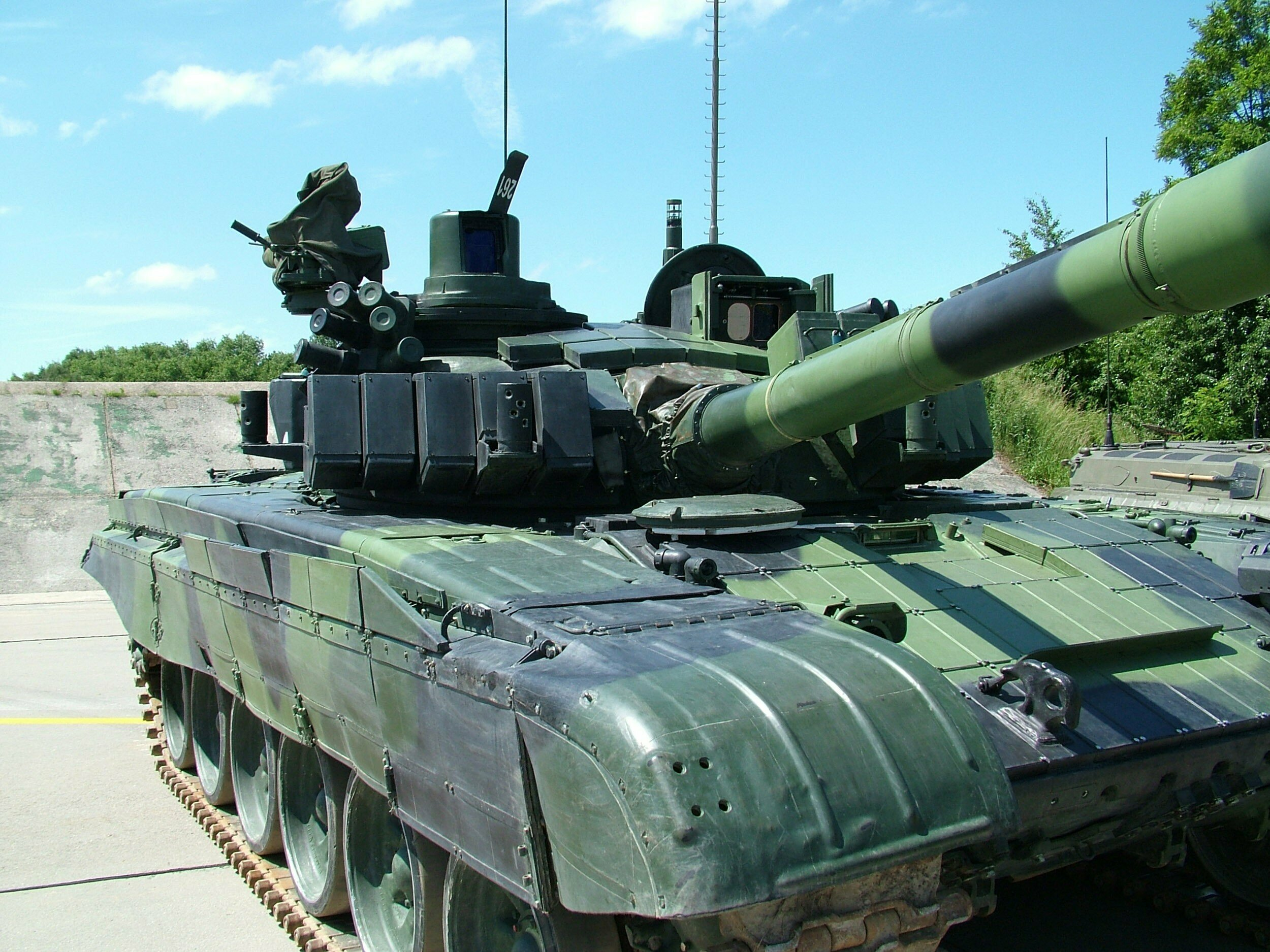
The Czech upgrade features the TURMS-T fire-control system which provides full "hunter-killer" capability.

These variants are not new builds, but upgrades of a large number of otherwise obsolete T-72 version hulls.

- T-72M4 CZ (2003) – Comprehensive upgrade of every aspect of the T-72M1 resulting in a tank that only superficially resembles the precursor, intended to remedy T-72's failures learned during the Gulf War. The automotive performance was enhanced with a Perkins CV12-1000 1,000 hp (740 kW) water-cooled diesel engine coupled to a Nimda XTG-411-6 automatic transmission. All drive train work was done by the Israeli firm Nimda and involved minor modifications of the tank's hull and the driver's compartment. The upgrade added new Czech-manufactured Dyna-72 ERA for protection against HEAT and kinetic rounds impacting the frontal aspects of the turret and hull, and against top-attack ATGMs and sub-munitions with ERA tiles covering the turret roof. Survivability is enhanced with the Polish-made Obra laser warning system integrated with a series of DGO-1 smoke grenade dischargers on each side of turret, a Deugra fire suppression system, REDA NBC suite and electromagnetic mine plow. The most important improvement in firepower comes from the use of the Galileo Avionica TURMS-T computerized FCS (similar to that used on the C1 Ariete) which enables a "hunter-killer" mode of operation; the commander has a panoramic day/night sight with built-in laser rangefinder and Attila thermal camera and can engage targets independently, while the gunner has his own primary sight with thermal channel. The FCS has sensors that correct for thermal distortion of the barrel, the temperature of the ammunition propellant, meteorological conditions, totaling 22 sensor clusters installed at several points on the turret. A new 125/EPpSV-97 APFSDS round was developed for use with the new tank which can defeat 540 mm of RHA at 2,000 m. The Czech tanks were also equipped with a rear-view camera, a new intercom, navigational system, the DITA 72/97B auto-diagnostic system and improvements to the suspension due to the increase in the weight of the T-72M4 CZ by 4 tonnes. Curiously, the obsolete 2A46 main gun was retained as was the original 2E28M stabilization system, which was modestly upgraded with new hydraulic drives and gyroscopic sensors, resulting in only marginal improvements in first-hit probability despite the sophisticated and expensive TURMS-T FCS. The published probability of hitting a stationary target on the move is said to be between 65 and 75% with the first fired round. In comparison, the Leopard 2A4 from the mid-1980s can achieve a first round hit probability on the move of 75-85% at 2,000 m and as high as 90% with a skilled crew. The original tender called for an order of 350 tanks, which was downgraded to 140 in the face of dwindling defense budgets and finally amounted to a commitment for only 35 tanks to be upgraded to the T-72M4 CZ standard. One of the reasons for this drastic reduction was due to the escalating unit cost of the upgrade — from an initial estimate of US$3.7M—and closing on a final cost of US$5.2M per tank.

- VT-72M4 – Modernized VT-72 (BREM-72) ARV with T-72M4CZ upgrades including the power pack and communications upgrades.

- T-72 Scarab, also known as T-72-4 (2017) – modernization of the T-72M1 by Czech company Excalibur Army, introduced in 2019. This version offers several modernization packages depending on buyer's preferences. These include increased armour protection, better power pack, better protection against WMDs, modern optical and targeting systems, remote control of the external 12.7 mm machine gun, new fire-control system, modern communications system, new fire protection system and more.
- T-72 Avenger, also known as T-72EA (2022) – modernization of the T-72 (various versions) to 3rd-generation standard by Excalibur Army which includes:
  - New opto-electronic devices and an upgraded night vision block for all three crew members from company Optics trade, which significantly improve night vision capabilities and resolution. It uses a laser rangefinder to increase the probability of a first round hit, an improved thermal sight with ballistic computer, an upgraded commander's sight and an upgraded driver's sight. The night vision systems operate fully in passive mode without the use of infrared lights.
  - Increased ballistic protection with most vulnerable parts covered with reactive armour, significantly increasing the tank's protection against RPGs and HEAT ammunition. The reactive armour added to the tank is the equivalent of 400 millimetres of rolled armour when hit by a warhead. In total, the tank is equipped with 196 boxes of reactive armour.
  - Significantly improved mobility due to an upgraded power pack with increased engine power to 840 hp and increased acceleration dynamics.
  - Complete modernization of driver's position with a new digital dashboard. New internal and external communication systems, digital radio enabling encrypted communication. New fire protection system. Periscopic sights with anti-laser protection.

=== East Germany ===
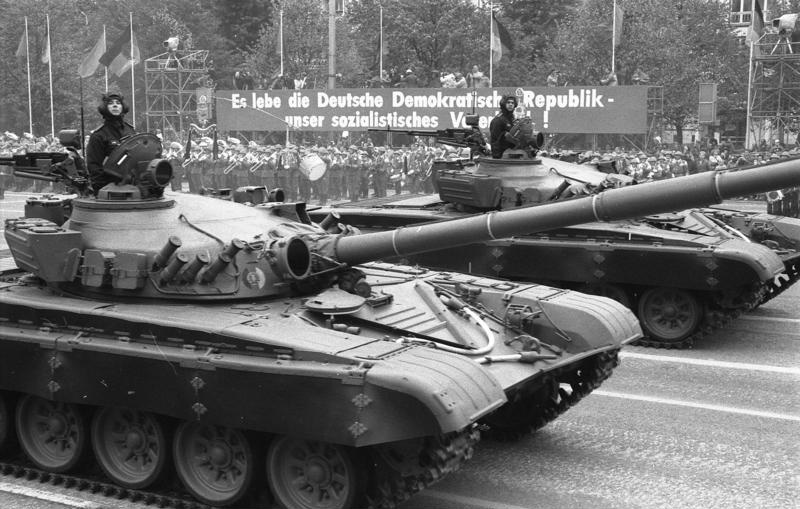
T-72Ms on parade in East Berlin, 1988

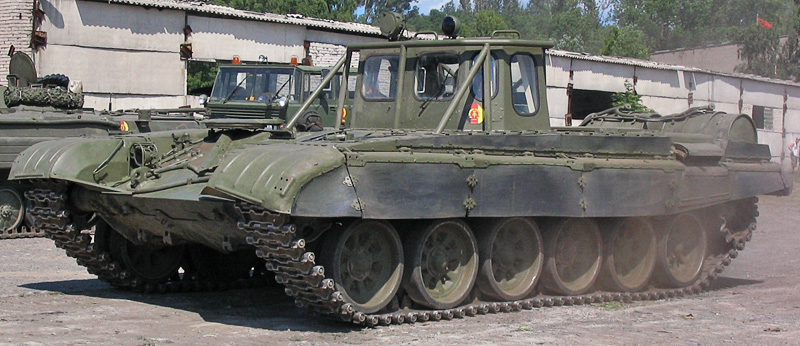
FAB 172M driver training vehicle

- T-72M – This designator was not only used for the standard T-72M, but also for 75 basic T-72s that were upgraded by RWN in 1986. These tanks (Kampfpanzer) were fitted with rubber side skirts, smoke grenade launchers "Tucha" and the additional 16 mm steel plate on the upper glacis plate.
- T-72M "Übergangsversion" – East German army designator for 23 late-production T-72Ms from Poland, fitted with the additional hull armour. Delivered in 1986.
- T-72(K) and T-72(K1) – East German army designators for command tanks (Führungspanzer).
- T-72TK – East German designation for VT-72B (BRAM-72B). The vehicle was planned to enter service with NVA in 1990, but only one was actually handed over to IB-9 (Instandsetzungsbatallion 9) at Drögeheide (Torgelow). Two others were still in Grossenhain (Central tank workshop near Dresden) on 3 October 1990. At this place the tanks got fitted with relevant NVA kit and the cranes were tested/certified.
- BLP 72 (Brückenlegepanzer) – The East-German army had plans to develop a new bridgelayer tank that should have been ready for series production from 1987 but after several difficulties the project was canceled.
- FAB 172M or FAP 172U (Fahrausbildungspanzer) – Driver training vehicle. Three vehicles were made by using the chassis of the cancelled BLP 72 project.

=== Georgia ===
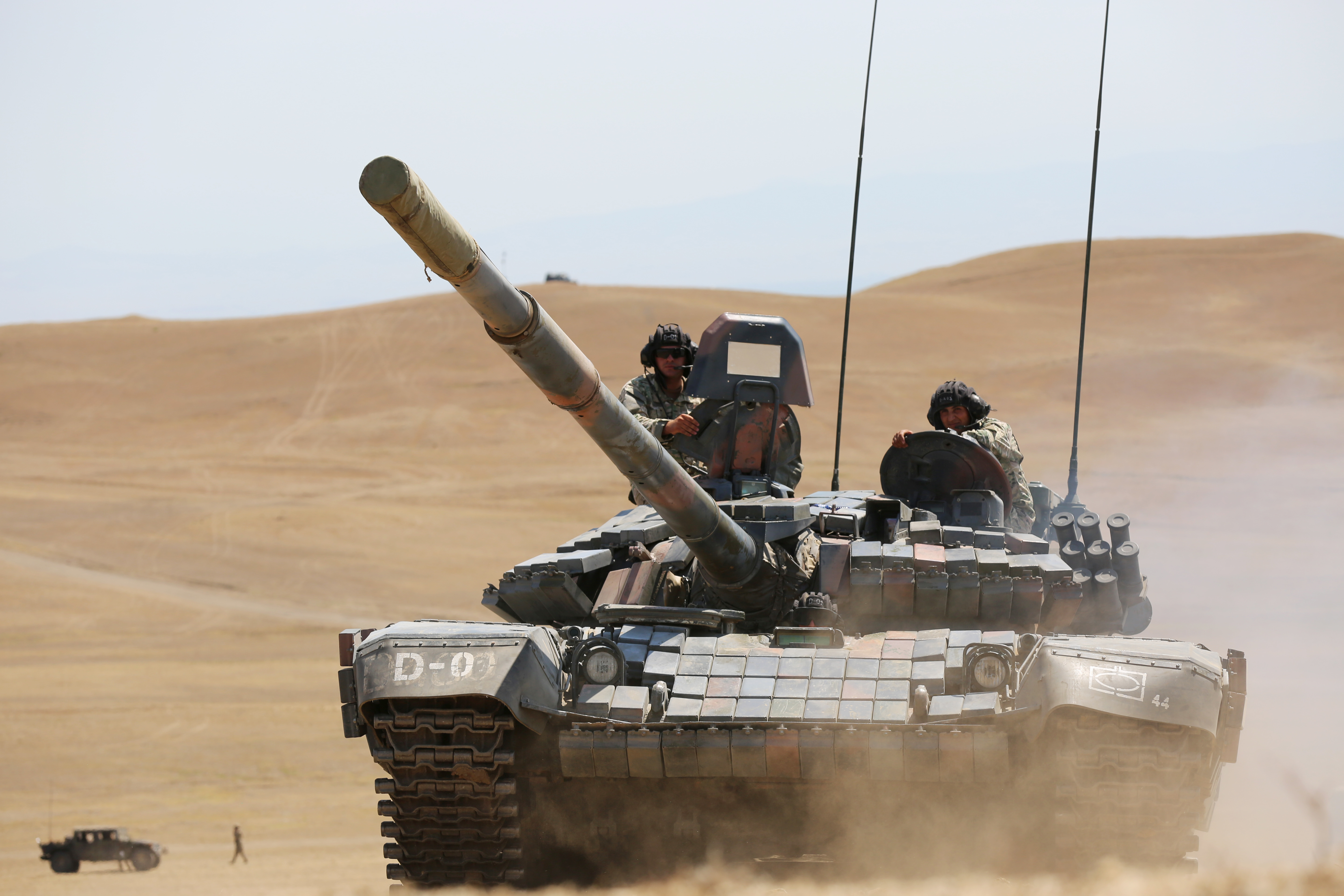
A Georgian T-72 SIM-1

- T-72 SIM-1 – Increased implementation of K-1 reactive and K-5 passive armor. New FALCON command and control system, GPS navigation system and Polish SKO-1T DRAWA-T fire control system with thermal imager and laser rangefinder (from PT-91 Twardy). It has also a friend-or-foe recognition system.

=== India ===
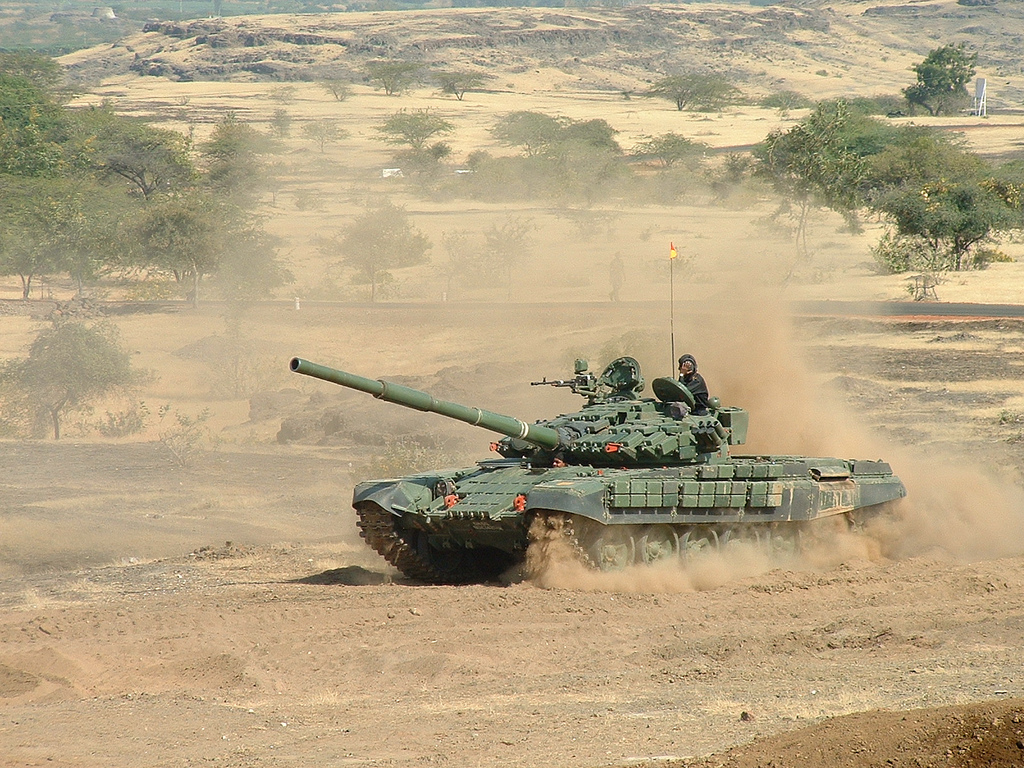
Ajeya MK2

By the late 1970s, Indian Army HQ had decided to acquire new-generation replacements for its UK-origin fleet of Centurion and Vijayanta MBTs (based on the Vickers MBT), and consequently, paper evaluations concerning the firepower and mobility characteristics of the two principal contenders being offered for full in-country production— French-origin AMX-40 and the British-origin Chieftain 800 — were conducted by the Indian Army. By early 1980, the Army chose the 43-tonne AMX-40 MBT, which was still in its design-stage. It was to be powered by a 1,100 hp Poyaud V12X 12-cylinder diesel engine coupled with a LSG-3000 automatic power shift transmission built by RENK Aktiengesellschaft of Germany offering a power-to-weight ratio of 25.6 hp/tonne, and armed with a 120 mm smoothbore cannon. However, AMX-40 had only marginal protection by the standards of 1980's. After the General elections in 1980, Prime Minister Indira Gandhi requested additional evaluation, including MBTs from the USSR, following which the Soviet Union's Ministry of Foreign Economic Relations (which after 1991 morphed into Oboronexport, then Rosoboronservice and ultimately Rosoboronexport State Corp) made a formal offer to India's Ministry of Defence (MoD) for supplying the 37-tonne T-72M Ob'yekt 172M-E4 MBT off-the-shelf, and according an approval for licensed-production of the 41.5-tonne T-72M-1982 Ob'yekt 172M-E6 to the MoD-owned Heavy Vehicles Factory (HVF) in Avadi. By early 1981, two T-72Ms—powered by a 780 hp diesel engine, armed with 125 mm 2A46M smoothbore gun and offering a power-to-weight ratio of 20 hp/tonne, were subjected to an exhaustive series of in-country firepower and mobility trials by the Army. After review of trial results, T-72M and T-72-1982 (powered by a Model V-84MS four-stroke 12-cylinder multi-fuel engine developing 840 hp and offering a power-to-weight ratio of 18.8 hp/tone) were selected as Army's future MBTs. Throughout the 1980s, India continued to induct T-72 tanks followed by a licensed production line in Heavy Vehicles Factory (HVF) in Avadi, India since 1984.

Request for information was issued in November 2023 to upgrade around 1,000 tanks with new engines, fire control system & other modern systems at ₹2,300 crore (equivalent to ₹25 billion or US$270 million in 2026) (US$270 million). A contract was signed with Rosoboronexport to procure 1,000 bhp engines in March 2025 at a cost of $248 million. A total of 1,000 engines are to be procured under the contract of which 200 engines to be directly imported, 800 to be assembled by Heavy Vehicles Factory from completely knocked down and semi knocked down kits. Procurement under 'Buy & Make' category.

On 18 September, the Indian Army's 512 Army Base Workshop in Pune completed the Pilot Overhaul of the Armoured Recovery Vehicle (ARV) VT-72B under its Project Lotus. The project is being undertaken by the Corps of Electronics and Mechanical Engineers in collaboration with an engineering team from the industry partner Airbornics Defence and Space (ADSL), a subsidiary of the JCBL Group. The procedure included the complete dismantling of the vehicle, replacing critical components, and repairing or substituting Major Unit Assemblies (MUAs).

On 27 February 2026, it was reported that the Indian Army has fitted 96 tanks of its T-72 fleet with the Thermo Imaging Fire Control System (TIFCS), an Indo-Israeli technology. The system also cleared the firing validation trials between November and December 2025 before induction. The upgrade was executed by the Alpha-Exec Defence & Aerospace Systems Pvt Ltd, a joint venture of Alpha Defence and Elbit Systems. The contract was signed in 2023.

On 21 September 2026, Ministry of Defence signed a contract with an Indian firm, Accurate Industrial Controls for procurement of Auxiliary Power Units (APUs) for T-72 and T-90 tanks at the cost of ₹586 crore (US$63 million).

The Indian Army has operated and tested several variants of the T-72, including:

- Ajeya MK1 (lit. 'Unconquerable') – Indian version of the T-72M1. In parallel with buying various T-72M off-the-shelf from the Soviet Union, India also launched its domestic production at Heavy Vehicles Factory.
- Ajeya MK2 – Indian version of the T-72M1 with ERA and banks of 6 smoke grenade-launchers on each side.
- Combat Improved Ajeya (Not to be confused with Ajeya MK2) - For a rather long time the Indian Army did not intend to modernize its T-72 tanks since it was relying on their own tank project, the Arjun. However, the Arjun program had been undergoing difficulties. As a result, they adopted the Operation Rhino plan aimed at re-equipping 1,500 T-72M1 tanks. The upgrade program provides for installation of a Polish SKO-1T DRAWA-T fire control system/thermal imager supplied by the Polish PCO/Cenzin (from PT-91 Twardy), DRDO explosive reactive armour, a navigation system from Israel's Tamam, German Litef or South African RDI, a locally developed laser illumination warning system, new radios manufactured by Tadiran or GES Marconi and an improved NBC protection system will be fitted. The tank is planned to be powered by a 1,000 hp (750 kW) S-1000 engine made by the Polish firm PZL-Wola (also from PT-91 Twardy). It is also upgraded with new fire detection and suppression systems and laser warning systems on either side of the turret. Indian sources often say that 1,800–2,000 T-72M1 tanks will be upgraded top to bottom while the rest will undergo only partial improvement.
- Tank EX – Indian integration of the Arjun turret onto the T-72 hull, Prototype only. Did not enter production as it was rejected by the Indian Army.

=== Iran ===
- Raad-2 - Iranian 155 mm self-propelled howitzer based on the T-72 hull.
- T-72M Rakhsh - Iranian T-72M upgrade, equipped with a variant of Kontakt-5 ERA among many upgrades.

=== Iraq ===
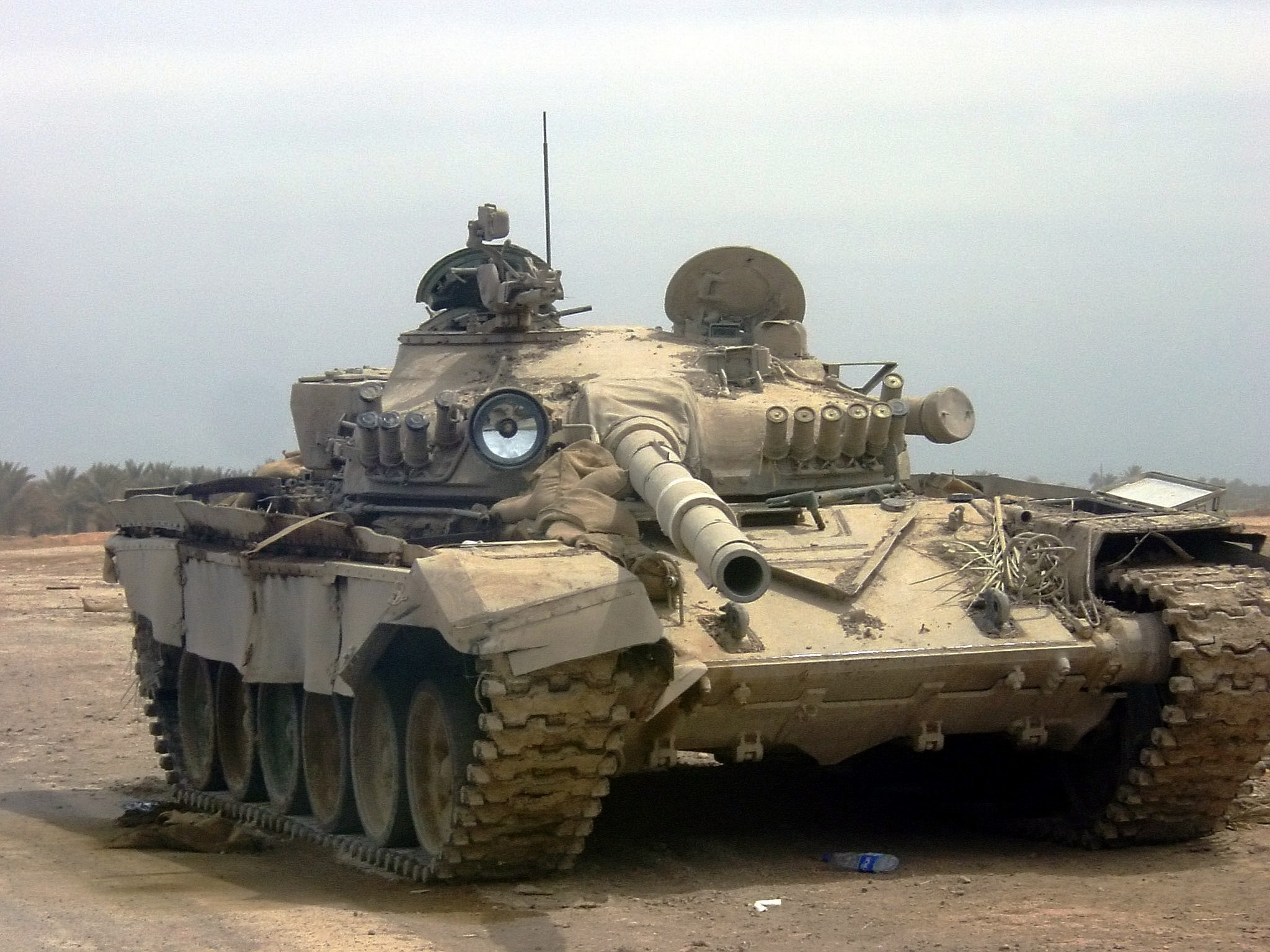
T-72 Asad Babil abandoned near Baghdad, April 2003

- T-72 Saddam – T-72M modified by Iraq to suit local conditions. Some of the suspension shock absorbers were removed and a searchlight on the right-hand-side of the main armament was added.
- Lion of Babylon (Asad Babil) – Iraqi-assembled version of the T-72M1.

=== Poland ===
- T-72M/T-72M1 –Licensed, standard T-72 models produced in Poland

- T-72M (Ob'yekt 172M-E3) – This export version of the T-72 was built under licence by Bumar-Łabędy in Gliwice starting in 1982. Like Soviet tanks, the Polish T-72M was initially fitted with "gill" armour; later the tanks were upgraded with rubber side skirts and 902W Tucha smoke grenade launchers. Late production models have an additional 16 mm steel plate welded on the upper glacis plate, like in the T-72M1.
- T-72M1 (Ob'yekt 172M-E5) – This export version of the T-72A was also built under licence in Poland since 1983. The most obvious external difference relative to Soviet analogs is the reduced number of KMT mounting points on the lower hull glacis plate. It is the first version to feature ceramic sand bars "kwartz" rods in the turret cavity and 16 mm (0.63 in) High Hardness Steel appliqué armor on upper glacis.
- T-72M1D – Polish designation for T-72M1K.
- T-72M1R – Modification of T-72M1.
- Jaguar: When Polish production of the T-72 started in 1982, the Poles considered upgrading them and the first domestic T-72 upgrade program was launched by the Institute of Armament and Equipment of the Polish Army. The project was code-named Jaguar since that was the designation under which the Soviet Union transferred the technical data package for the T-72. The Jaguar was never more than a concept.
- Wilk: Beginning in 1986, the Polish T-72 Wilk project was instituted to allow tank repair plants to upgrade T-72 tanks within their own facilities. In particular, it was proposed that the Soviet-made Volna fire control system be replaced by the Czechoslovak-made Kladivo FCS or by the Polish SKO-1 Mérida, which was originally designed for T-55AM "Merida". Besides the new FCS, the Radomka passive night vision devices were installed in the driver's compartment, as was the Liswarta night sight, Obra laser illumination warning system, Tellur anti-laser smoke grenade launchers, solid or modular metal side skirts and the Polish-developed Erawa-1 or Erawa-2 explosive reactive armour was also fitted. This program was further developed and led to the PT-91.

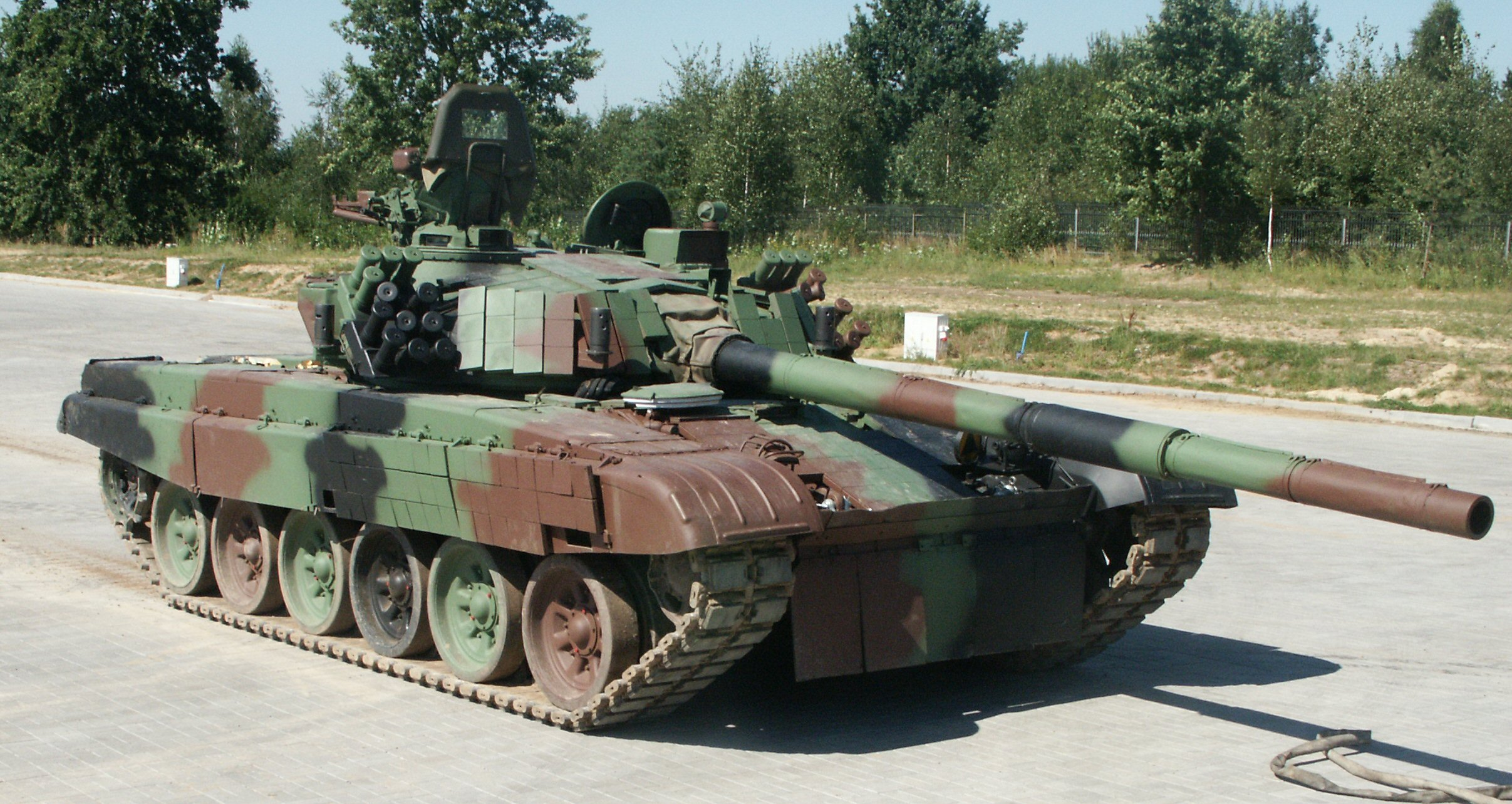
PT-91 Twardy in Polish service.

- PT-91 Twardy – A Polish main battle tank based on T-72M1 developed sometime between the late 1980s and early 1990s and involving use of a new digital fire-control system, newly developed ERA and an uprated powerplant. This formed the basis for a whole line of derivative vehicles. PT-91 was a result of previous T-72 upgrade programs.
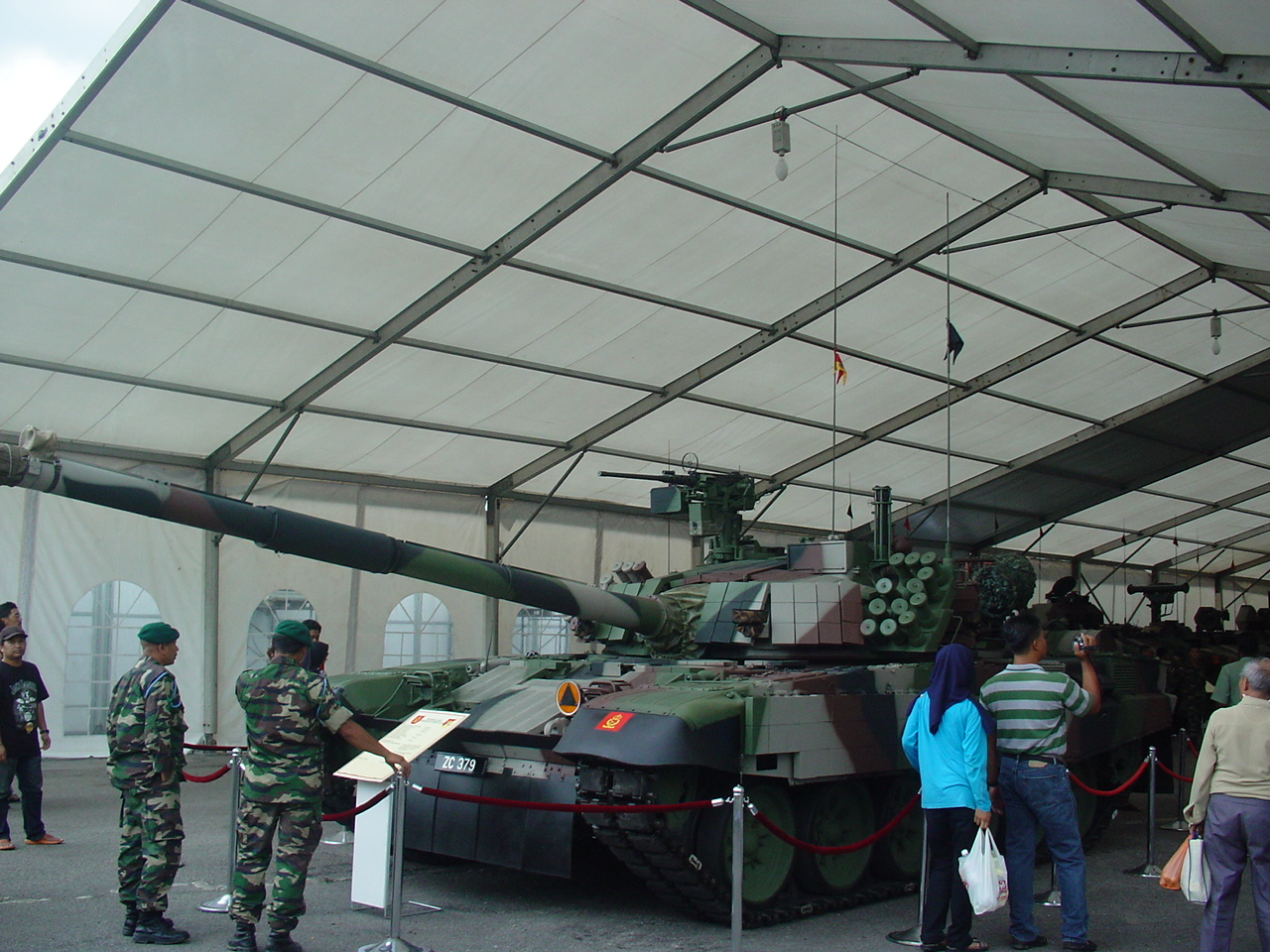
  - Malaysian PT-91M Pendekar
    PT-91M Pendekar – Production export variant for Malaysia with Sagem Savan-15 fire control system, a new 1,000 hp powerpack with Renk automatic transmission bringing its top speed to 70 km/h. Its main gun have been changed to a ZTS 2A46MS 125 mm gun, a 7.62 mm FN MAG coaxial machine gun and a 12.7 mm FN Browning M2 HB AA machine gun. This variant is also equipped with Sagem panoramic sight, a Sagem laser gyro inertial navigation system, turret stabilisation system, Obra-3 laser-warning system, integrated with 81 mm smoke grenade launchers, CBRN warning and protection system, Thales communication systems. ERAWA 2 Explosive Reactive Armour, and German-made tank tracks (Diehl Defence). Two prototypes made (renamed PT-91E and PT-91Ex), 48 serial PT-91M Pendekar vehicles produced 2007–2009.
- WZT-3 – ARV based on the T-72M. It is armed with a 12.7 mm (1/2 in) machine-gun fitted to the commander's hatch. Standard equipment includes: crane with telescopic jib that can lift a maximum load of fifteen tonnes, front-mounted stabilizing dozer blade, main and secondary winches.

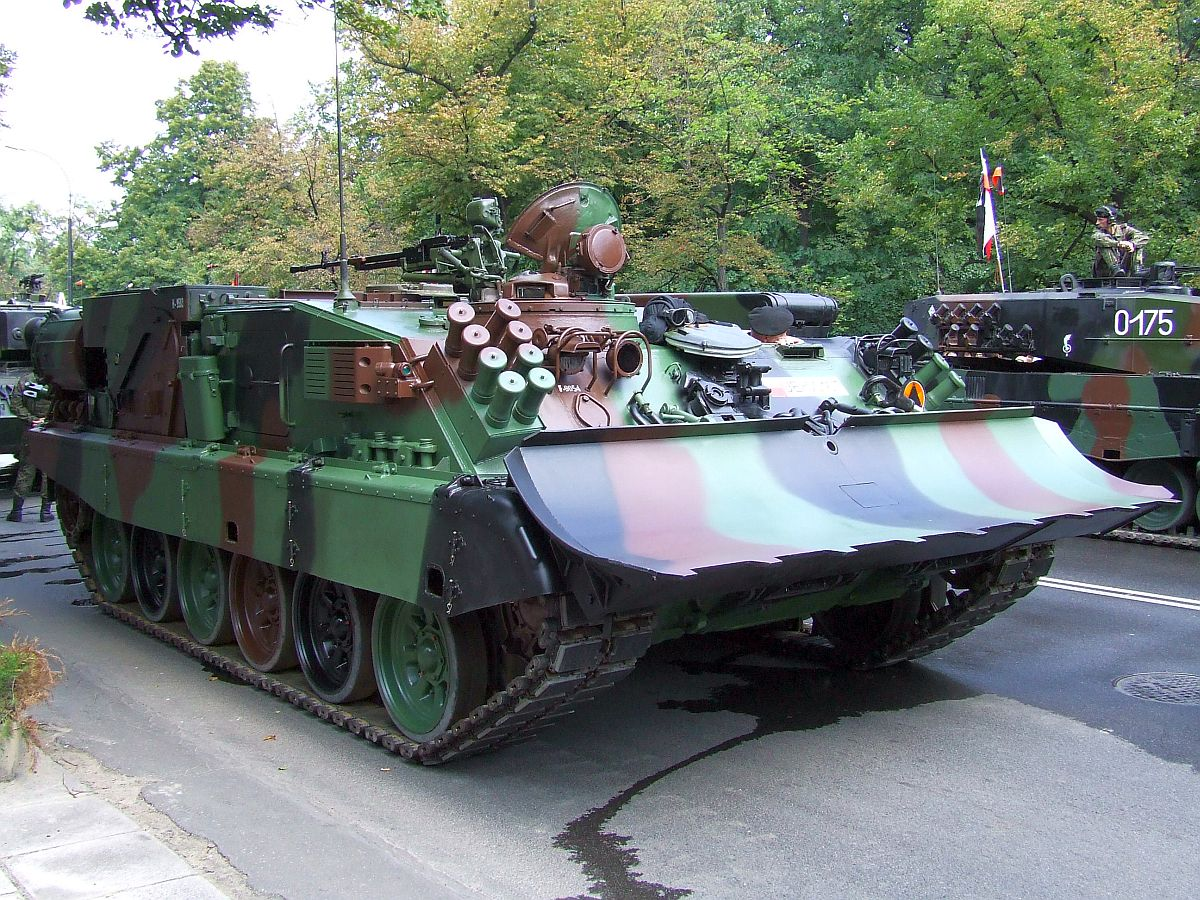
WZT-3M ARV

- WZT-3M – A PT-91 based variant for Polish Army
- M-84AI – A M-84A based variant, made on licence in Yugoslavia – 15 vehicles for Kuwait
- ARV-3 – A T-72 based variant for Indian Army – 352 vehicles made

- MID Bizon-S – engineering tank based on the PT-91 tank hull

- MID-M – A PT-91M based variant for Malaysian Army
- WZT-4 – Armoured recovery vehicle, PT-91M based variant for Malaysian Army (technically this vehicle is closely related to MID-M, not the WZT-3)

- SJ-09 – Polish driver training vehicle. The turret has been replaced by a flat-plate cabin with dummy gun barrel. Polish army uses T-72 based vehicles, Malaysian Army has one based on PT-91M.
- PZA Loara – SPAAG prototype based on the T-72 chassis.

=== Romania ===
- TR-125 – Romanian prototype tank based on T-72 with extra armour, new FCS, new gun, modified suspension and more powerful diesel engine. A reverse engineered vehicle, it was larger in dimensions than the T-72. Its name stands for Tanc Românesc 125 ("Romanian Tank 125"), with "125" indicating the gun caliber of 125 mm.

=== Serbia ===
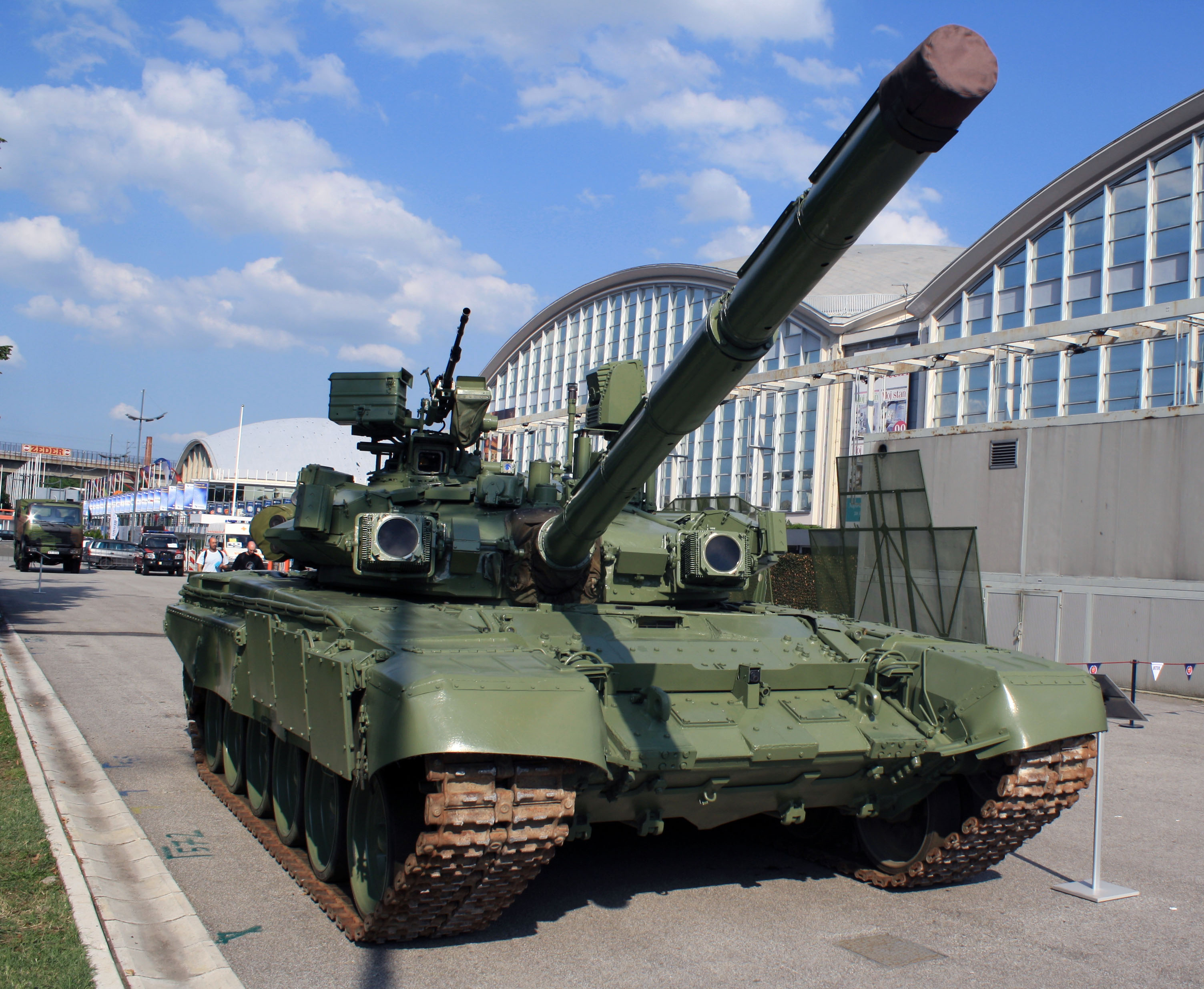
Serbian modernized tank M-84AS

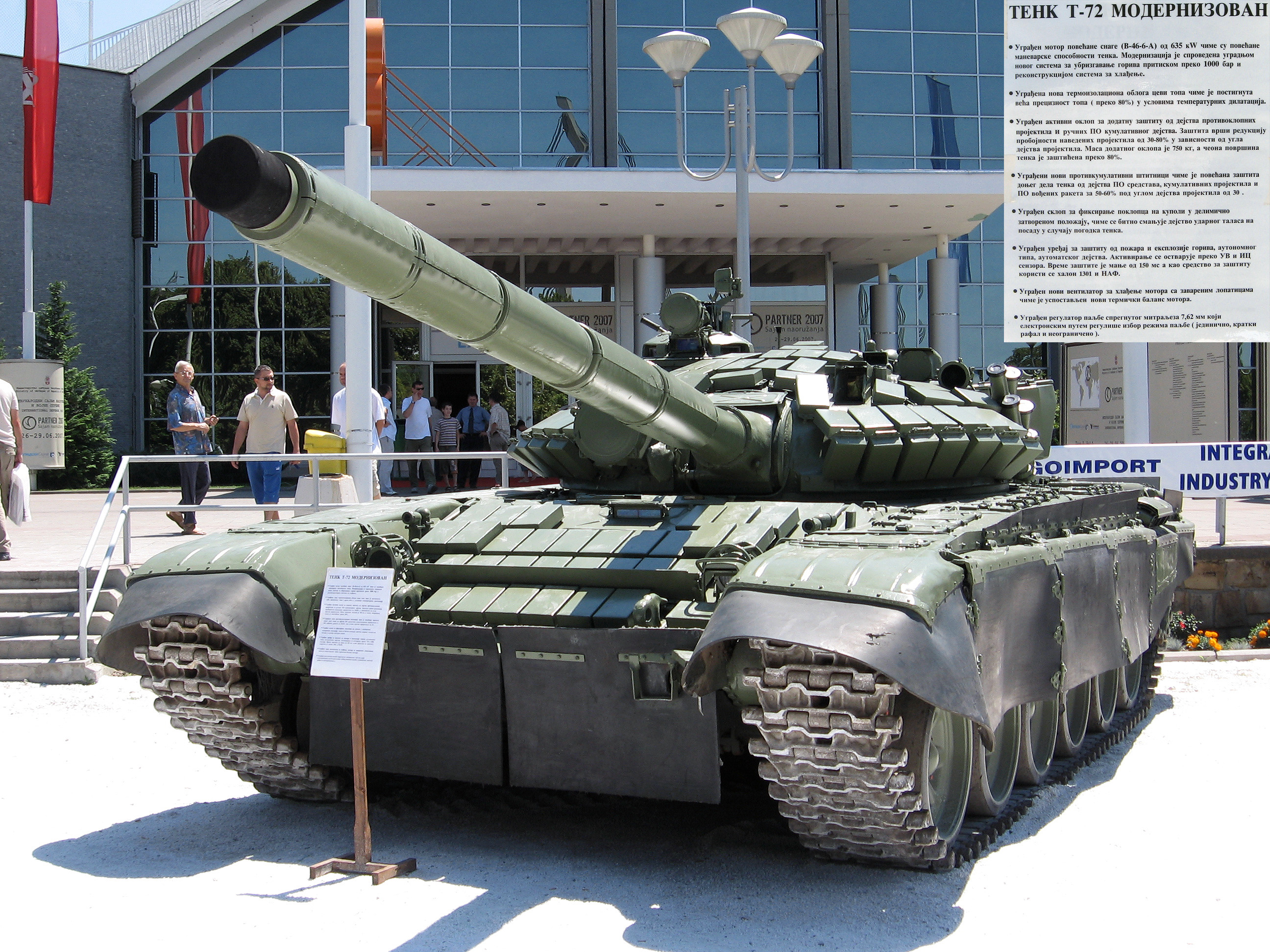
Serbian upgraded T-72 featuring reactive armour

- Yugoimport T-72 modernization package – Upgraded engine, communication gear and ERA.
- M-84AS – Is a prototype tank using an M-84A tank modernized to T-90 level by Yugoimport SDPR.
- M-84AS1 – Is a substantially modernized version of the M-84 main battle tank
- M-84AI – Armoured recovery vehicle created from the chassis of a M-84A. Completed with the help of Polish experts, resulting in a vehicle similar to the WZT-3. Standard equipment includes: A TD-50 crane, front-mounted stabilizing dozer blade, main and secondary winches.

=== Slovakia ===
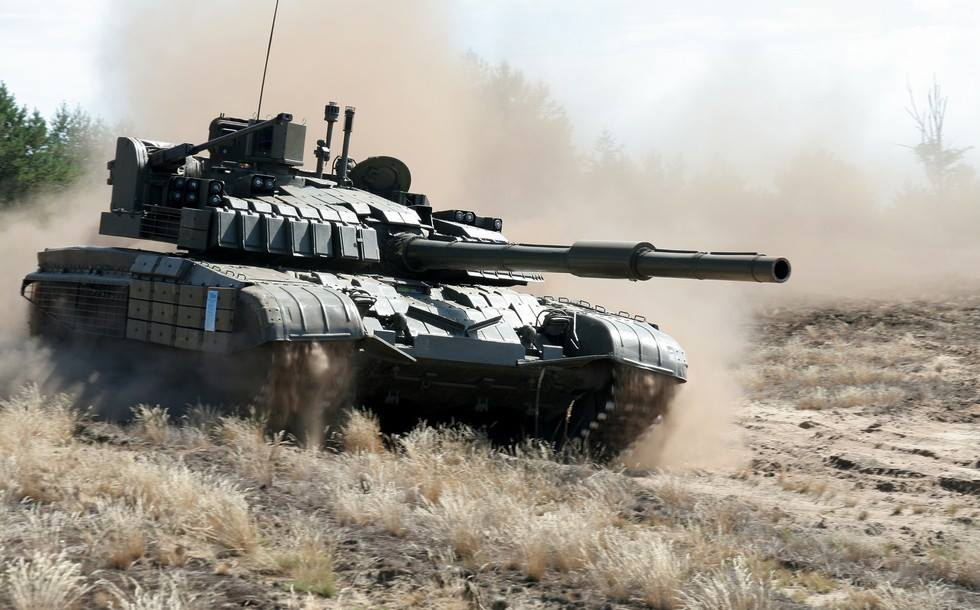
Slovak T-72M2

- T-72M1A – T-72M1 upgraded with suspension of the driver's seat from hull roof, DSM 16.1 engine monitoring system, ERA armour package around the turret with a flat front section, fire detection and suppression system, improved transmission, improved hull floor protection, laser Detection Warning System, modified electrical harness, PNK-72 driver's night sight, SGS-72A commanders stabilized passive sight, gunner's sight with a large head with two section door, S12U diesel engine, Slovenian EFCS3-72A fire control system and MB smoke grenade dischargers on the each side of the turret. It also has two external sensor rod mounts on turret roof.
- T-72M2 Moderna – Slovak modernization. Development was completed but never entered serial production.
- VT-72C – Improved VT-72B produced since 1999 for India. It is fitted with a more powerful Polish S-12U diesel engine and has a modified interior.
- VT-72Ž – Combat engineer tank. Similar to the VT-72B but with a modified telescopic arm with bucket.
- MT-72 – Slovak scissors-type bridge based on T-72 chassis. When deployed the bridge is 20 m long and will span a gap of 18 m. It is capable of carrying loads of up to 50 tonnes.
- Himalaya – Essentially a Zuzana 155 mm (45 calibers) gun installed on a modified T-72M1 chassis. (The first prototype of which was completed by ZTS Špeciál in December 1992)

=== South Africa ===
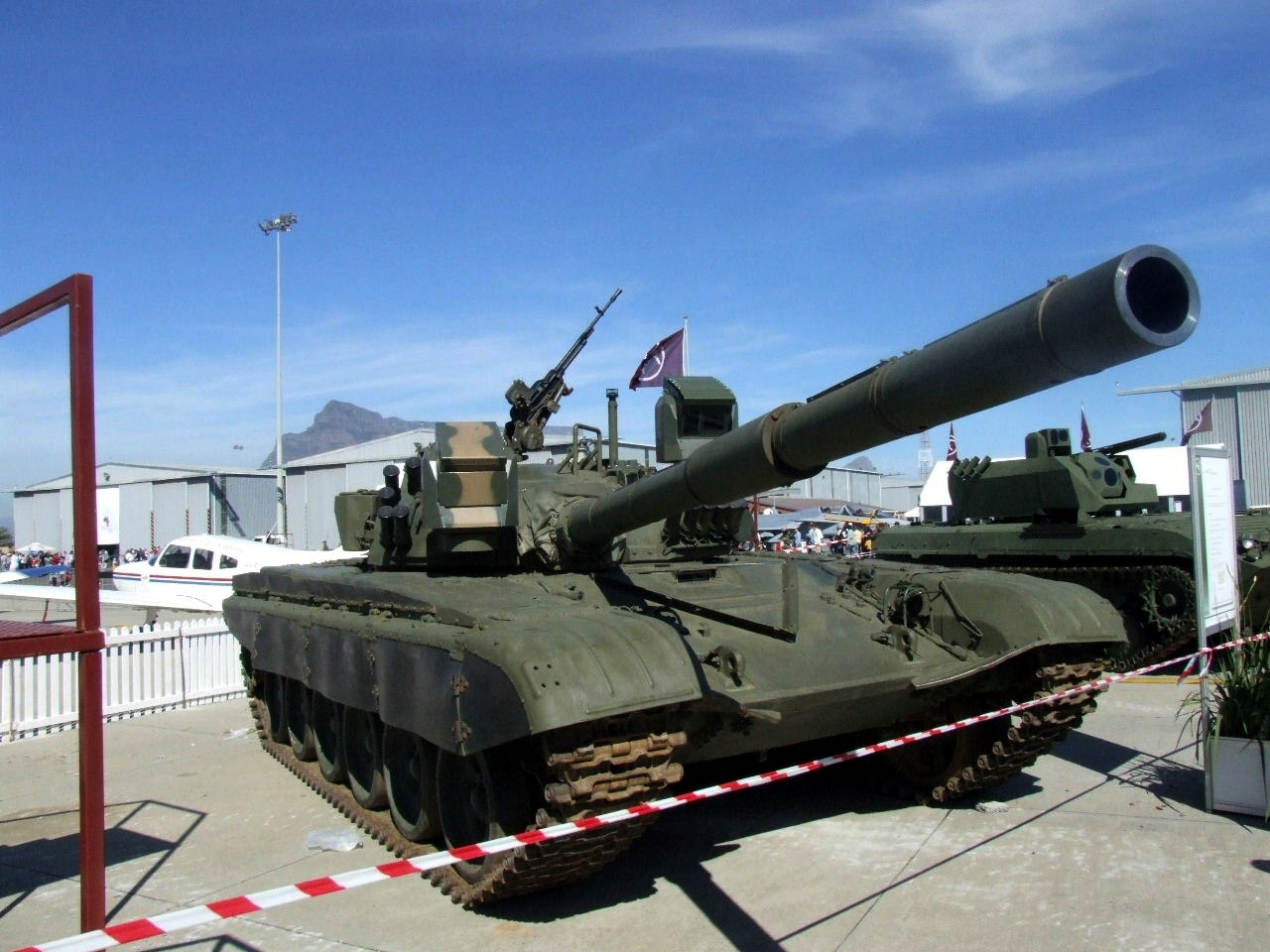
T-72 ATE/IST "Tiger" taken by Bob Adams, 24th September 2006 and Uploaded by Russavia

SADF T-72 ATE "Tiger" side profile

- T-72 "Tiger" – The modernization package from Lyttelton Engineering Works included two large sights installed on the front of the turret, South Africa got 2 T-72s from Poland as part of Operation Carbenet in 1990 to test the strengths and weaknesses of the T-72 so that South Africa could counter it, in the end they made the T-72 IST "Tiger" and T-72/35. South Africa also offered a self-propelled artillery conversion for existing T-72s, rearming the chassis with a turret adopted from the G6 howitzer which would be named the "T-72M1 (T6)". The T-72 Tiger offers an advanced Fire Control System (FCS) that uses Thermal devices, an Auto tracking system, a Laser Warning receiver and a Laser Rangfinder.

SADF T-72 ZA-35 side profile

- T-72/35 aka "T-72 (ZA-35)" – Was a T-72M1 that the SADF got from Poland for Operation Carbenet, trials took place between March 5th and May 18th 1990 and they started testing the T-72 to discover the strengths and weaknesses of the tank to see how it compared to current South African Tanks (And most likely the research was used in the development of the TTD), later after trials it was fitted with a ZA-35 turret instead of the normal turret by Kentron (Now Denel) for conducting more experiments on the T-72 Chassis.

SADF T-72 T6 side profile

- T-72M1 (T6) aka "T-72 G6" Was a T-72 rearmed after South Africa acquired T-72M1 tanks from Poland for Operation Carbenet developing 3 Different systems with them, the T-72/35, T-72 IST "Tiger" and the T-72M1 (T6), it was a technology demonstrator made to see if the new T6 conversion of the G6 turret could be used on a T-72 hull eventually proving that the T6 modular version of the G6 turret could be placed on just about anything, it had a 155mm gun same as the G6.

=== Syria ===
- T-72A/M1 - Syrian unmarked modernization. Instead of the TPN-3-49, the T-72 tanks are equipped with thermal imaging sights designated as "Viper-72", locally produced. The maximum range of the sight is up to 4 kilometers. The sight is made of foreign components since 2018.
- T-72 Adra – Syrian upgrade featuring slat and spaced armour as extra protection against HEAT.
- T-72 Shafrah – Syrian upgrade featuring brackets placed on the tank's turret, which have a number of angled plates welded onto them. Some tanks have sideskirts (most appear to at least have sideskirt mounts consisting of two metal beams above road-wheels), which follow a similar pattern, but the welded plates are not angled. Armor plates are made of RHA (1.5 mm – 2 mm).
- T-72M1S – Syrian-Italian upgrade with the addition of the Galileo Avionica TURMS-T computerised FCS, including infrared cameras, improved gun stabilisation, stabilised sights for the gunner and the commander, and capability to launch 9M119 Refleks ATGMs. 124 T-72M1s and T-72AVs were upgraded to this standard between 2015 and 2018. Very few of the upgraded T-72AVs retained their explosive reactive armour after being upgraded.
- Golan-1000 – A rocket system which carries three massive 500 mm rounds, each packed with 500 kg of high-explosive fragmentation ammunition. Built on a T-72 tank chassis, the rocket system has been in use with the Syrian Army since May 2018.

=== Ukraine ===
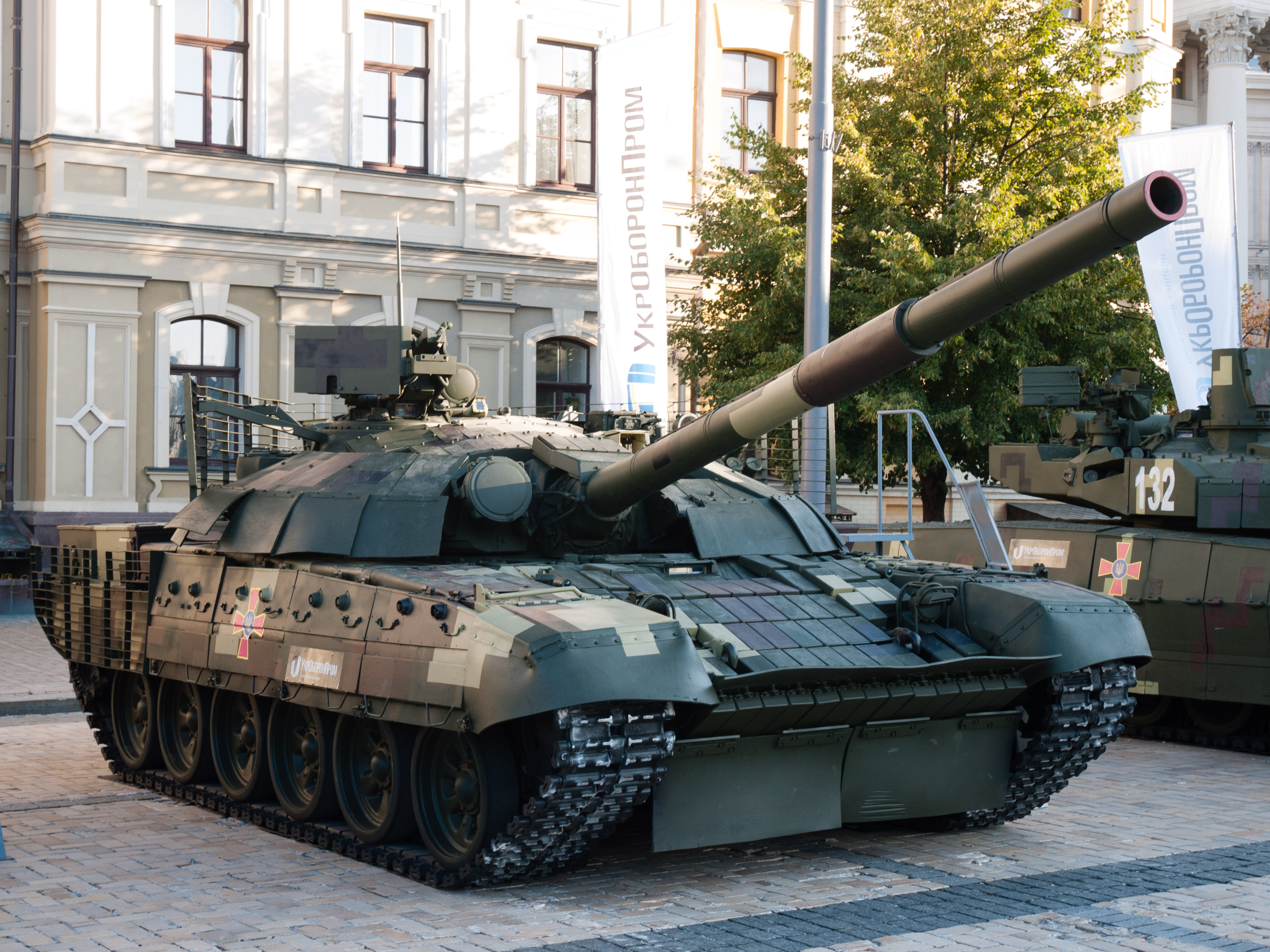
T-72AMT of the Ukrainian Army.

During the Russo-Ukrainian War's invasion by Russia phase from 2022 onward Ukrainian forces have used captured Russian tanks, including T-72s.

- T-72AM "Banan"– unveiled in 1992, the first Ukrainian T-72A upgrade covered extensively with early-generation Kontakt-1 ERA tiles (V-shaped array around the sides of the turret and an array on side skirts). It is powered by the 6TD-1 or 6TD-2 diesel engine (1,250 hp) from the T-84 and features additional smoke grenade launchers.
- T-72AG – Kharkiv Morozov Machine Building Design Bureau (KMDB) modernization package aimed at improving the automotive and firepower capabilities of the tank with components mostly derived from the T-80UD program, including an improved 6TD-1 engine rated at 1,000 hp or 1,200 hp (881 kW) 6TD-2, new drivetrain components from the T-80UD, an improved engine cooling system, turbocharger and air filter. These upgrades improve upon the T-72B tank's mobility and bring the upgraded vehicle up to par with the T-80UD. Further improvements were made to the fire-control system, which is now an adaptation of the 1A45 Irtysh system, with 1G46 day sight, TKN-4S, TPN-4 or TPN-4 Buran-Catherine night sights (the latter equipped with thermal viewer) which also enables the use of 9M119M Invar laser-guided missiles launched from the main gun. The tank turret was covered in Kontakt-5 ERA tiles and the main gun was upgraded to the newer 2A46M1 variant, and coupled with a significantly more precise 2E42M main gun stabilization system. However, with most of the tank's components reliant upon the T-80UD, this variant has not had any export success.
- T-72MP – This modernization package was unveiled in 1997 by KMDB and includes an improved 6TD-1 engine, Kontakt-5 or Nizh ERA, a modern fire suppression system and an advanced Sagem SAVAN 15MP fire-control system with the multi-channel thermal SAVAN 15MP (gunner) and panoramic SFIM VS580 (commander) sights. But the capabilities of the FCS were not fully utilized since the tank retained the obsolete 2E42-2 stabilization system and 2A46M main gun. The upgrade is offered jointly with Sagem of France, and PSP Bohemia of the Czech Republic.
- T-72-120 – KMDB main armament package first offered in 1999 with the T-72AG and T-72MP upgrades, which includes an auto-loaded KBM-2 120 mm main gun, developed with the French-based GIAT Industries and capable of firing NATO-standard ammunition or ATGMs. This upgrade includes a new 2E42-M stabilizer and a new auto-loader system housed in the redesigned turret bustle and similar to that used in the Leclerc main battle tank with a capacity of 20 single fixed rounds and further 20 stored in the hull in place of the legacy AZ auto-loading mechanism. The high costs involved with such an extensive modification have thus far driven away potential buyers.
- T-72UA1 – A relatively simple upgrade developed for smaller defense budgets of the nations of the developing world, but one that has seen commercial success. The original V-46 engine was replaced with a newer 5TDFMA two-stroke diesel making 1,050 hp (775 kW) and fitted with an enhanced cooling system for use in tropical environments, which allows the tank to be operated for extended periods at temperatures exceeding 55 °C. The tank was also equipped with an EA-10-2 APU with an output of 10 kW, allowing the vehicle's systems to be fully powered when stationary without running the main engine, thus drastically reducing fuel consumption. An air conditioner remains optional. Protection is enhanced with the use of Nizh ERA tiles on the turret while retaining the Kontakt-1 tiles on the hull (however Nizh tiles are compatible with Kontakt-1 mounting points and can be retrofitted). The main gun, stabilizer and FCS remain unchanged compared to the T-72B. Ethiopia purchased the T-72UA1 with 72 tanks delivered in 2011 and 99 in 2012. The Ukrainian army became a customer in 2014 in response to an immediate need following the eruption of the War in Donbass. It is believed that less than 30 vehicles were ordered.
- T-72E – Upgraded version of the T-72B ("E" stands for "Export") showed at IDEX 2011 and developed together with the T-64E. The hull front and sides are protected by Kontakt-1 ERA tiles, while the turret front, sides (sides' frontal part) and top are homogeneously protected by Nizh armor. The engine is upgraded, it is a 5TDFMA-1 multi-fuel diesel engine, developing 1050 hp. The tank features also air conditioning, day-and-night sighting system with integrated laser rangefinder and ATGM capability. The weight is 42.7 t, giving the tank a power/weight ratio of 24,6 hp/t.
- BMT-72 – Ukrainian T-72 upgrade. The unique compact design of the Ukrainian-developed BMT-72 power pack, based on that of the T-84, made it possible not only to considerably increase the power capabilities of the vehicle, but also to introduce into the vehicle design a troop compartment. The troop compartment is located between the fighting compartment and the power pack compartment. In the troop compartment roof there is a set of three hatches in slightly raised portion of the hull roof behind turret that allow the troops to get in or dismount the vehicle. There are also steps on the end of each catwalk at rear of vehicle. The main visual difference between BMT-72 and T-72 is a seventh pair of roadwheels.

- T-72AMT Obr.2022 Mobilization Model with new TPN1-49-23UM night sight and no "Luna" infrared searchlight. Standard T-72 open-type machine gun mount installation and standard T-72 tracks with a sequential hinges system.

- BTS-5B – Ukrainian version of the BREM-1.
- T-72UMG Variant operated by Turkmenistan

=== Yugoslavia ===
- M-84 – Indigenous main battle tank based on the T-72M but with several upgrades.
- M-84A – Improved version based on the T-72M1, with new SUV-M-84 computerized fire-control system, including the DNNS-2 gunner's day/night sight, with independent stabilization in two planes and integral Laser rangefinder. Other upgrades include a stronger 1,000 hp engine.

- M-84AK – Command version of M-84A fitted with land navigation equipment.

- M-84AB – Export version of M-84A. About 150 were exported to Kuwait.

- M-84ABK – Command version of M-84AB fitted with land navigation equipment.
- M-84ABN – Navigation version of M-84AB fitted with extensive communication equipments, land navigation equipment, and a generator for the command role.
