= T-84 =

BM Oplot zr. 1999/2000
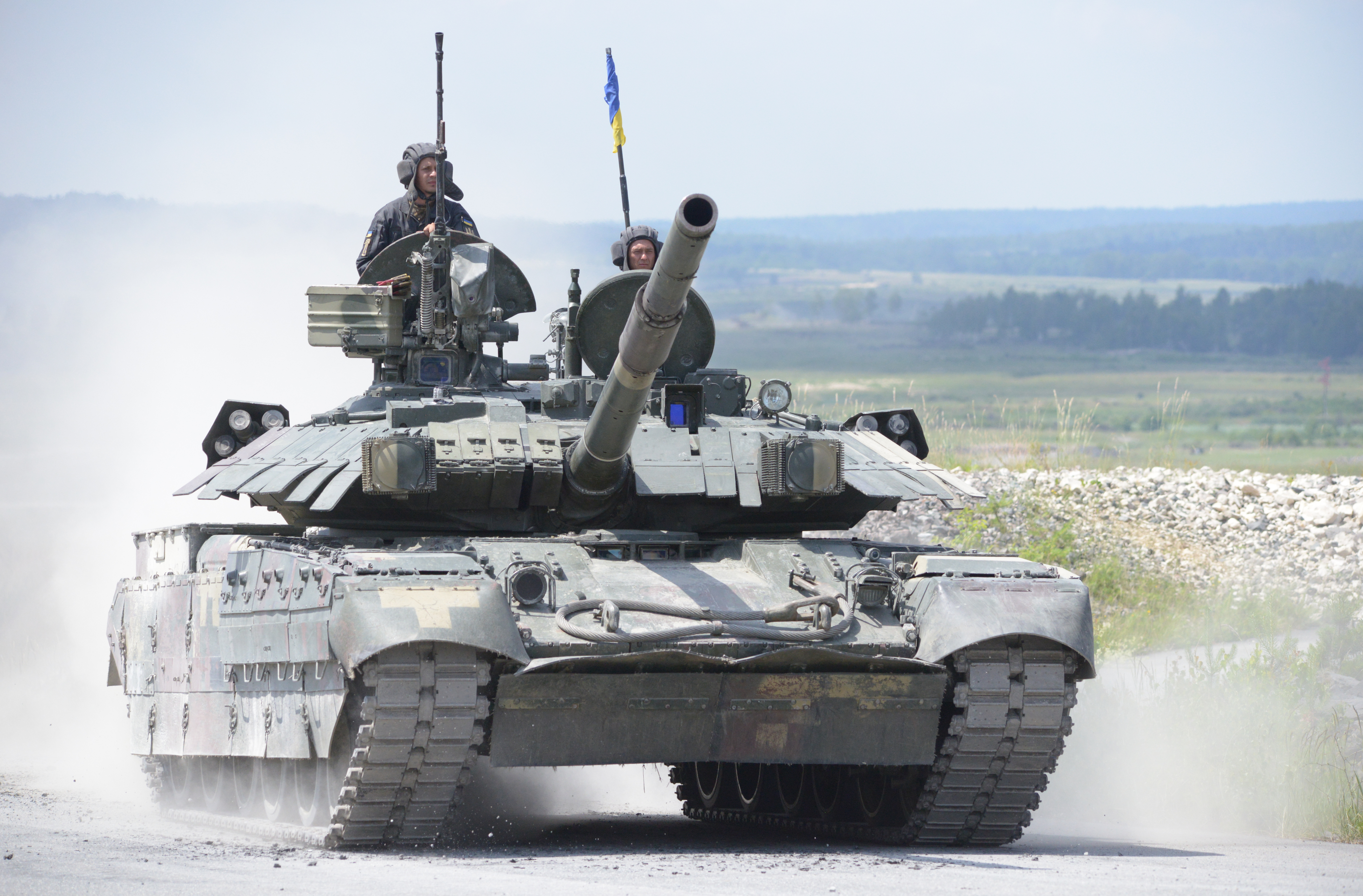
- An Oplot in 2018
- Type: Main battle tank
- Place of origin: Soviet Union / Ukraine

Service history
- In service: 1999–present
- Used by: Armed Forces of Ukraine
- Wars: Russo-Ukrainian War; War in Donbas; Russian invasion of Ukraine; 2025 Cambodia‒Thailand conflict

Production history
- Designer: KMDB
- Designed: 1975–1994
- Manufacturer: Malyshev Factory
- Produced: 1991–2001

Specifications (T-80)
- Mass: 46 tonnes
- Length: 7.086 m (23 ft 3 in)
- Width: 3.775 m (12 ft 5 in)
- Height: 2.215 m (7 ft 3 in)
- Crew: 3
- Elevation: +13°, -6°
- Armour: Steel, composite, ERA
- Main armament: 125 mm smoothbore KBA-3 cannon (43 rds) or 120 mm KBA-2 smoothbore gun for Yatagan vehicle (40 rds)
- Secondary armament: 7.62 mm KT-7.62 coaxial machine gun 12.7 mm KT-12.7 anti-aircraft machine gun
- Engine: KMDB 6TD-2E 6-cylinder diesel 16.3 litre 1,200 hp (890 kW)
- Power/weight: 26 hp/tonne
- Suspension: Torsion bars, hydraulic dampers
- Ground clearance: 0.515 m (1 ft 8.3 in)
- Fuel capacity: 1,300 L (290 imp gal; 340 US gal)
- Operational range: 540 km (340 mi)
- Maximum speed: 65 km/h (40 mph) – 70 km/h (43 mph)

BM Oplot zr. 2008/2009
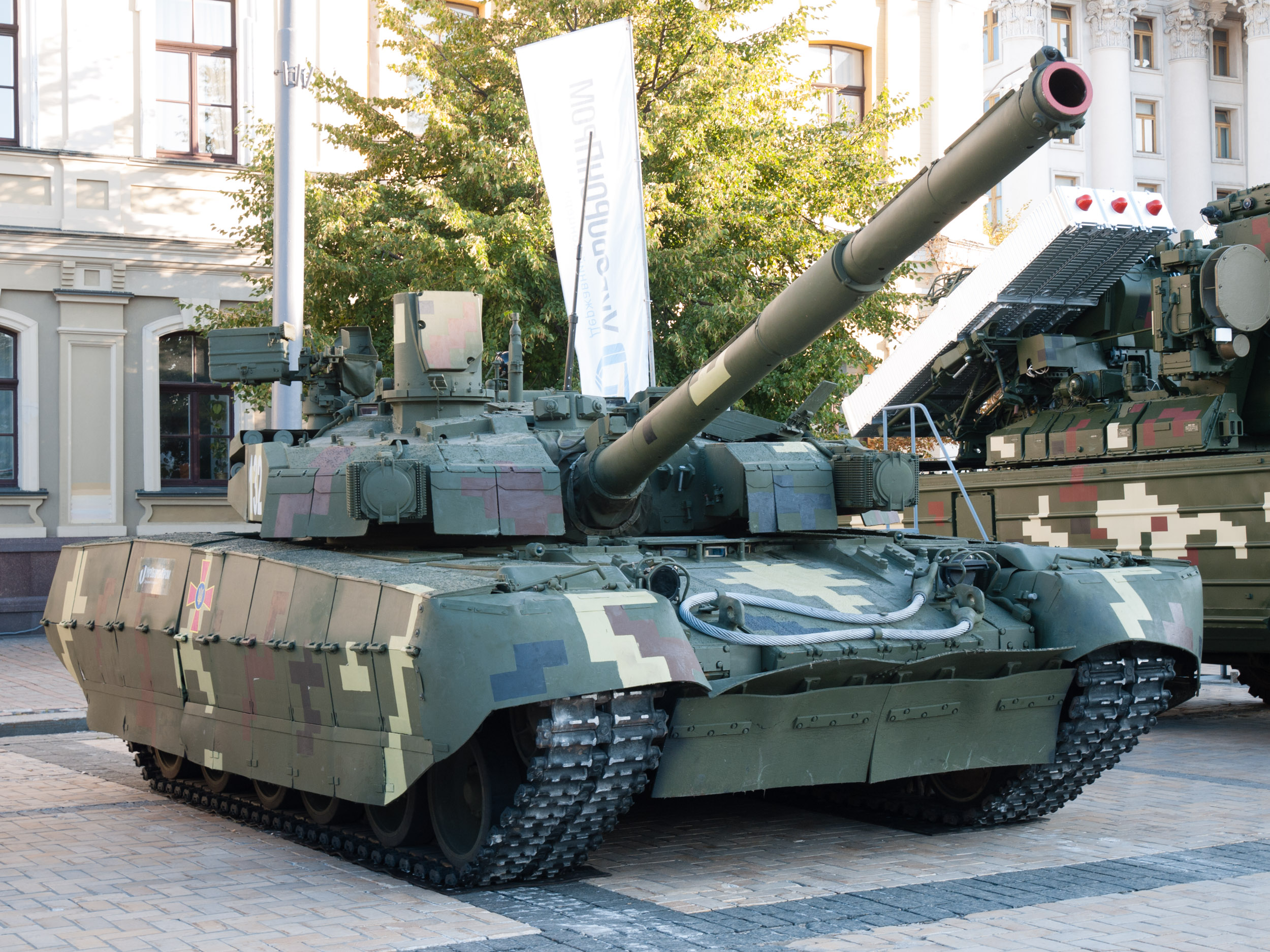
- A BM Oplot main battle tank, Kyiv, Ukraine, 2018
- Place of origin: Ukraine

Service history
- In service: 2009–present
- Used by: Ukraine; Thailand

Specifications
- Mass: 51 tonnes
- Length: 7.075 m (23 ft 3 in)
- Width: 3.400 m (11 ft 2 in)
- Height: 2.800 m (9 ft 2 in)
- Armor: Modular composite, ERA, APS
- Main armament: 125 mm smoothbore KBA-3 cannon with 46 rounds
- Engine: KMDB 6TD-2E opposed piston 6-cylinder (12 pistons) diesel (1,200 hp) or theoretical mounting of the KMDB 6TD-4 opposed piston 6-cylinder diesel (1,500 hp)
- Power/weight: 24.7 hp/t (6TD-2E); 30 hp/t (6TD-4)
- Transmission: Automatic
- Suspension: Torsion bar
- Ground clearance: 0.50 m (1 ft 8 in)
- Fuel capacity: 1,140 litres (250 imp gal; 300 US gal)
- Operational range: 500 km (310 mi)
- Maximum speed: Road 70 km/h (43 mph); Off-road: 45 km/h (28 mph)

The T-84 is a Ukrainian main battle tank (MBT), based on the Soviet T-80 MBT introduced in 1976, specifically the diesel engine version: T-80UD. The T-84 was first built in 1994 and 10 vehicles entered service in the Ukrainian Armed Forces in 1999 under the name BM Oplot. Its high-performance opposed-piston engine makes it a fast tank, comparable to other modern MBTs with a power-to-weight ratio of about 26 horsepower per tonne (19 kW/t).

The BM Oplot zr. 2008 and 2009 is an advanced version incorporating an armoured ammunition compartment in a new turret bustle (this was not part of the autoloader system, but extra ammunition for when replenishment is needed). Few of these vehicles were made, with them being used for parades and showcases heavily. The T-84-120 Yatagan is a prototype model intended for export, mounting a 120 mm gun able to fire NATO-standard tank ammunition and anti-tank guided missiles.

== Development history ==
After the adoption of the T-80 tank, the Soviets began improving its design. The disadvantages of the gas-turbine engine were readily apparent, and so several design projects were initiated to adopt a diesel alternative.

=== Development of the T-80UD ===
Leningrad Kirov Plant (LKZ) began work in 1975 with a diesel 2V16 1500 hp engine on a T-80B chassis. This was designated the Ob. 219RD. Work was not completed until 1983. The design bureau at Omsk Transport Engineering Design Bureau developed a test bed, called the Ob. 644, powered by the V-46-6 of the T-72. Further work on these was not continued, as the main focus at the time was on the gas-turbine engine favored by Defence Minister Dmitry Ustinov.

In 1975, Kharkiv Morozov Machine Building Design Bureau (KMDB) began work on the Object (Ob.) 278, a T-80 powered by a 6TD 1000 hp diesel engine developed for the improved T-64 and T-74 (Ob. 450). This quickly became outclassed by the Ob. 476, and so lost favor. The Ob. 478M was a more sophisticated model than the Ob. 478. Improvements included the Sistema fire control system, Shatter active protection system, and a 1,500 hp diesel engine. This too was abandoned as it was considered too costly.

After the death of Ustinov in 1984, the strength of the design bureau of the LKZ began to weaken and the Ministry of Defense started to think seriously about equipping the T-80 tanks with diesel engines.

In September 1985, the government approved the development start of a diesel-powered T-80U. Five prototypes of the Ob. 478B with the 6TD engine were produced by year's end. Prototypes of a less sophisticated model, called Ob. 478A, were built for comparison. The government approved production of the Ob. 478B in 1986. The Soviet Army noted problems with the tank, and full-scale production was delayed to make changes. The Soviet Army also opposed a plan to name the tank the T-84, as KMDB had originally envisioned, because it would draw attention to the fact that the Soviets were operating four tanks (T-64, T-72, T-80 and T-84) with more or less similar characteristics. The Central Committee settled the debate, siding with the Army. It was subsequently adopted into service as the T-80UD.

The T-80UD was first deployed to the 4th Guards Tank Division and the 2nd Guards Motor Rifle Division. It was first publicly shown at the 1990 Moscow Victory Day Parade, then later in the 1991 Soviet coup d'état attempt.

=== Development of the T-84 ===
KMDB developed a welded turret to replace cast turrets, which were no longer made in Ukraine after the breakup of the Soviet Union. A T-80UD with this turret, Ob. 478BK, was completed in 1995. Ukraine delivered 175 Ob. 478BE to Pakistan by 1999. The Ob. 478D with Aynet fire control system and Buran night sight was trialed. Pilots of the Ob. 478DU and Ob. 478DU2 were also produced. One prototype appeared at International Defence Exhibition (IDEX) in 1995 as the "T-84 Supertank." An Ob. 478DM appeared at IDEX 1999 as the T-84M. The Ob. 478DU4 gave rise to the T-84 Oplot, which was marketed to Turkey. The 125 mm caliber gun was replaced with a 120 mm one able to fire NATO ammunition, and designated the T-84-120. This was marketed to Turkey as the Yatagan, and was trialed there in 2000.

The Ukrainian government eventually made good on its promise to buy the T-84 for the Ukrainian Army. Ten T-84Ms were delivered from 2001 to 2003. Ukraine was forced to sell off four of these to the United States when it struggled to finance the tanks.

=== Development of the T-84-120 ===
The T-84-120 Yatagan was developed in 2000 in Kharkiv to NATO standards for the Turkish tender for a new MBT. The tank featured a 120mm smooth bore gun that was capable of firing AT-11 Sniper ATGMs, a reloading mechanism and blow-out panels. The Yatagan was also equipped with communications equipment from the French Thomson company, an FN Herstal machine gun, automatic transmission, a 6TD-2 diesel engine with 1200hp and FCS taken from Oplot. In total, three 120mm guns of different designs were tested on the tank. The T-84-120 Yatagan also participated in the Kyiv parade. The current condition of the tank is unknown.

== Design ==
The T-84's outstanding feature is a 26 hp/t power-to-weight ratio. It is also designed to perform well in hot climates, and includes an air-conditioned crew compartment (operating temperature range is claimed to be −40 to 55 °C).

The BM Oplot is a further development of the prior T-84 Oplot. The tank has a conventional layout with the driver's compartment at the front, fighting compartment in the middle and engine at the rear, accommodating a crew of three.

The driver sitting in the centre is provided with a single-piece hatch cover that opens to the right. The commander on the right and the gunner on the left have single-piece hatches.

The tank has a length of 9.7 m (including the forward-facing gun), a width of 3.4 m without removable side skirts, and a height of 2.8 m. The combat weight of the tank is 51 tons.

=== Armament ===
The Oplot is armed with a smoothbore 125 mm KBA-3 cannon, a KT-7.62 (PKT) coaxial machine gun and a KT-12.7 anti-aircraft machine gun. The main gun is fed by a loading system equipped with conveyor, automatic loader, and control system. The ammunition includes high explosive fragmentation (HE-FRAG), armour-piercing fin-stabilized discarding sabot (APFSDS) kinetic energy penetrator, and high-explosive anti-tank (HEAT).

The main gun can also fire a laser-guided missile against armoured ground vehicles and hovering helicopters within the range of 5,000m. The missile can be fired on the move against travelling targets. A tandem-charge warhead fitted on the missile can defeat targets equipped with explosive reactive armour (ERA) and advanced spaced armour.

The Oplot has 46 rounds of ammunition for the main gun, of which 28 rounds are placed in the automatic loader. Other ammunition types carried are 1,250 rounds for KT-7.62 machine gun, 450 rounds for KT-12.7 machine gun and 450 rounds for AKS Assault rifle.

=== Fire control ===
The vehicle has three forward-facing periscopes in front of the driver's cupola. The centre periscope can be replaced with a night driving device.

The fire control system includes a gunner's day sight, PNK-6 commander's panoramic sighting system, PTT-2 thermal imaging sight, anti-aircraft sight and anti-aircraft machine gun control system. Detection range of targets for thermal sighting system is up to 8 km.

The tank is also equipped with LIO-V ballistic computer, armament stabiliser and other systems.

The advanced fire-control system enables the gunner or commander to lay and fire the main armament on the move. The stationary and moving targets can be hit with a high first round hit probability.

=== Protection ===
The protection system includes multilayer passive armour, Duplet explosive reactive armour (ERA), Zaslin Active Protection System, Varta optronic countermeasures system and other tank protection means.

Built-in new generation Duplet anti-tandem-charge warhead ERA protects against APFSDS, HESH and HEAT rounds.

Duplet improves protection against:

- Hand anti-tank grenades, hand-held, and stationary grenade launchers and recoilless guns (including ammunition with tandem-charge warheads)
- Anti-tank guided missiles (ATGMs) of TOW-2, MILAN, and Shturm-S type
- HEAT projectiles fired by 125 mm tank smoothbore guns
- APFSDS projectiles fired by 125 mm and 120 mm tank guns

Both sides of the driver's compartment are fitted with ERA panels for extended protection. The hull sides are hinged with large rubber skirts to withstand the attacks of man-portable anti-tank weapons. The modular ERA package can be easily replaced or upgraded as needed by future requirements.

The Oplot features a Varta optronic countermeasures system for deceiving incoming missiles and anti-tank guided weapons. The system integrates laser warning sensors, infra-red jammer, and smoke or aerosol screen laying system. The optronic countermeasure system can:

- confuse the guidance systems of ATGMs by emitting laser jamming covering the horizontal plane of ±18° relative to the main gun tube and ±2° in the vertical plane
- jam ATGM guidance systems that use laser guidance illumination of targets, semi-automatic laser guided homing projectiles, and artillery systems equipped with laser range-finders by activating the remote fast-deploying aerosol screens in a sector of ±45° relative to the main gun tube

Crew's collective protection system protects the crew and interior equipment against effects of nuclear explosions, radioactive substances, toxic agents, biological warfare agents, and detects and suppresses fires in the compartments of crew and power pack.

The Oplot tank can withstand an explosion of up to 10 kg trinitrotoluene (TNT) under the tank track and up to 4 kg TNT under the driver's compartment. The vehicle has overpressure-type NBC protection system and can be fitted with track mine-clearing systems.

Due to the collapse of Soviet Union, the Malyshev Factory was no longer able to obtain ceramic armour modules from Russia and only the initial batch of T-84 were produced with such. Instead, later batches of T-84's composite armour is composed of special purpose rubber sandwiched between steel and alloy plates. The exact difference in performance between the new and prior armor is unknown and depends on the performance of dynamic armor.

=== Engine and mobility ===
BM Oplot is powered by a 6TD-2E 6-cylinder turbocharged liquid-cooled engine, which delivers 1,200 horsepower (895 kW). It is improved and more environmentally friendly version of the prior 6TD-2 diesel engine, used on the T-84 MBT. The tank could also be powered by a more powerful 6TD-3 diesel, developing 1,500 horsepower (1,119 kW). Both engines could use diesel, jet engine fuel, petrol or any mixtures of them.

The engine provides a maximum on-road speed of 70 kilometres per hour (43 mph) and a range of 500 kilometres (311 mi) with added fuel tanks. The tank is also equipped with a diesel-electric auxiliary power unit 10 kilowatts (13 hp) to supply power to onboard systems when the main engine is off.

BM Oplot is equipped with torsion bar suspension. Either side of the six dual rubber-tyred road wheels are provided with idler at forward, drive sprocket at the rear, and track support rollers.

The first, second and sixth road wheel stations are fitted with hydraulic shock absorbers. The tank can negotiate a gradient of 32° and side slope of 25°. Equally, the tank can ford a water depth of 5m using deep water fording equipment.

== Variants ==
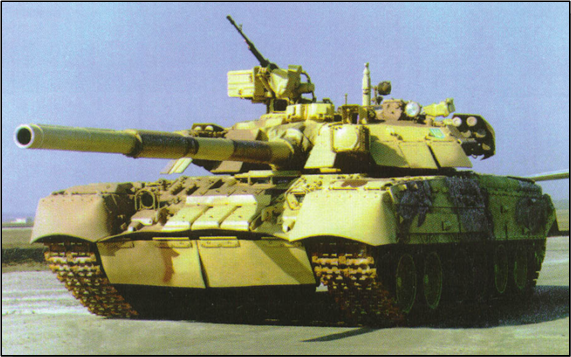
An early model T-84 tank, whose appearance is near-identical to the T-80UD. Later versions have reactive armour integrated more smoothly with the hull.

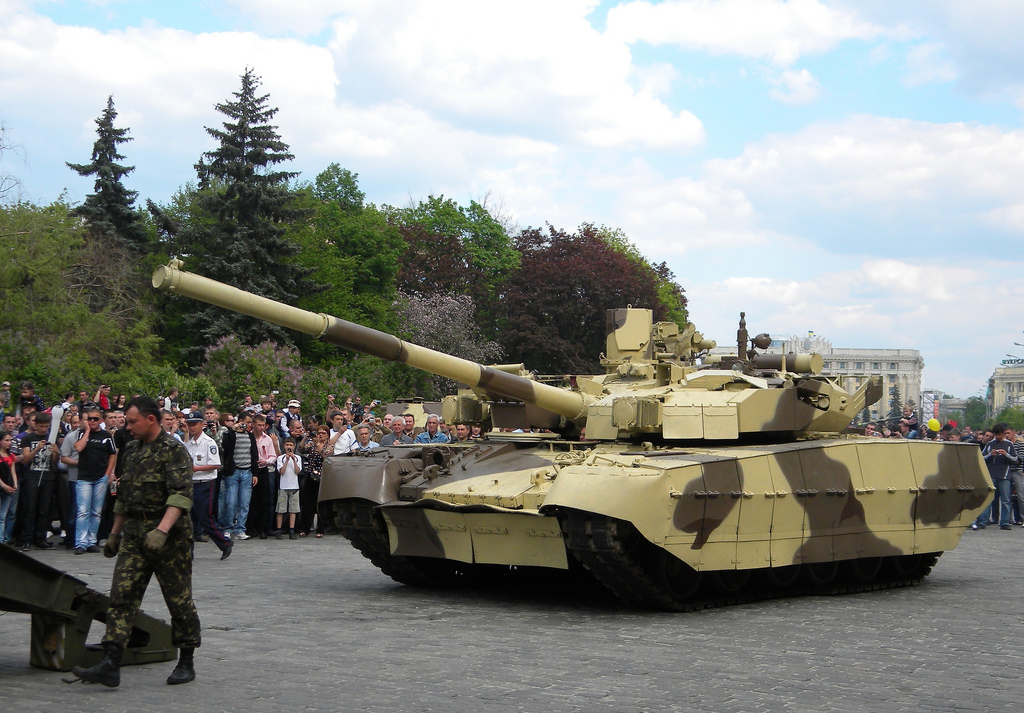
A BM Oplot guided onto a tank transporter

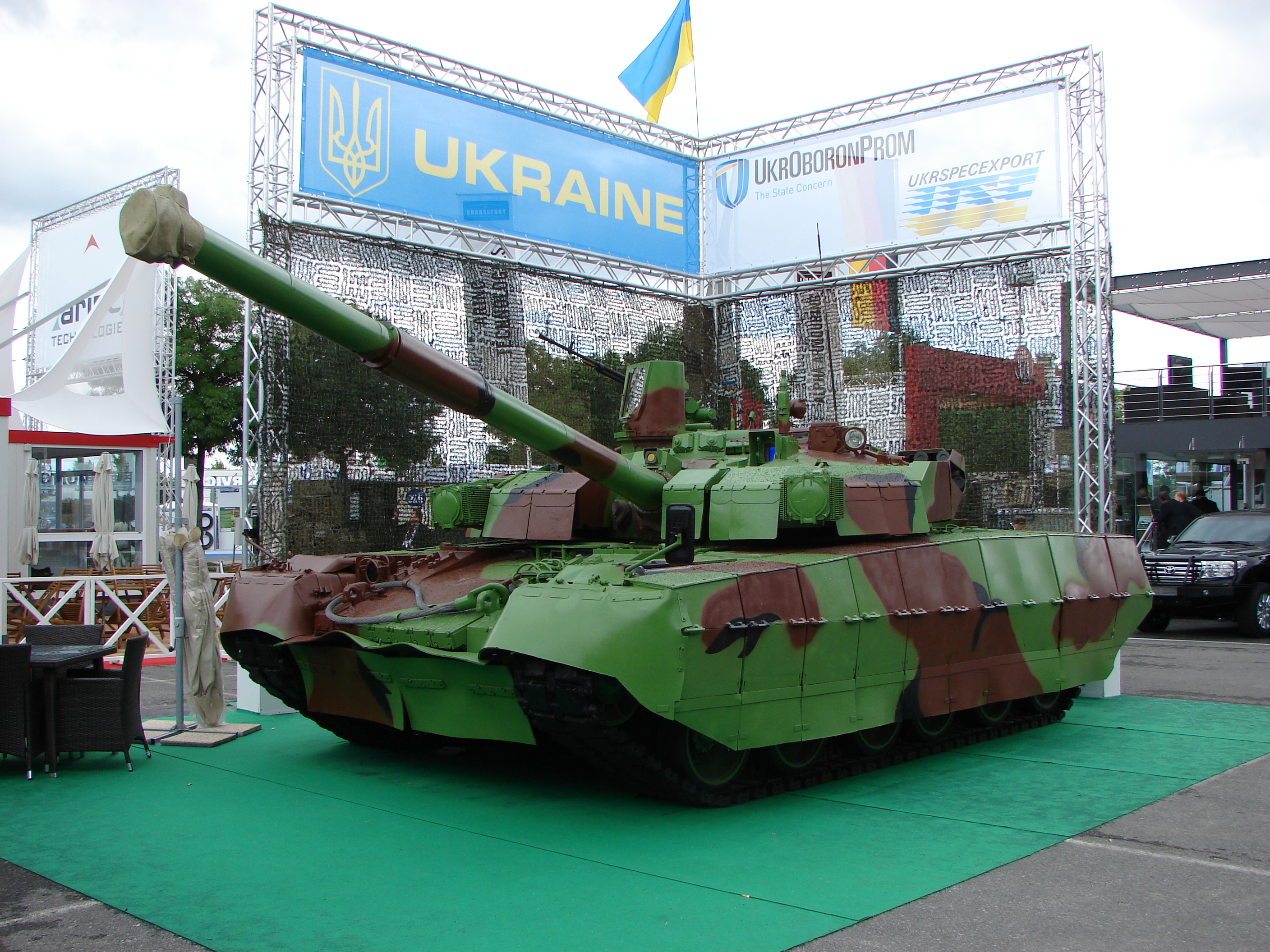
A BM Oplot at Eurosatory 2012

Object 478
Prototype.

Object 478M
Improvements included the Sistema fire control system, Shater active protection system, and a 1500 hp diesel engine from the Transdizel engine design bureau.

Object 478A Comparison model.
A simplified Object 478B.

T-80UD (Object 478B)
See T-80UD.

T-80UD (Object 478BE)
T-80UD for export to Pakistan.
T-80UD (Object 478BE-1)

Variant of the 478BE with a welded turret.

T-80UD (Object 478BEM)
More similar to the T-84 variants but was designated as T-80UD. Made for export to the US for testing in 2004. Included an auxiliary power unit (APU). Did not include Shtora-1.
Object 478BEM-1

Included Drozd-1 active protection system (APS). Three built.

Object 478BEM-2

Included air conditioning. One built.

T-80UD (Object 478D)
Featured a new 1200 hp 6TD-2 engine.

T-80UD (Object 478DU)
Object 478D with a T-64 suspension. Prototype trialled by Ukraine and Pakistan.

T-80UD (Object 478DU1)
Object 478D with traditional heavy rubber rollers in its suspension. Trialled by Pakistan prior to purchase of the Object 478BE and BE-1.

T-84 (Object 478DU2)
One of the various prototypes for the T-84. Featured a welded turret with integrated reactive armor. Smoke grenades were moved from the front of the turret onto the top rear part. This smoke launcher configuration was kept for the T-84 after this. Manufactured in 1992. Trialled in spring 1995 by Pakistan.

T-84 (Object 478DU4)
One of the various prototypes for the T-84. Featured new reactive armor on the sideskirts and an APU. Manufactured in 1999.

T-84 (Object 478DU5)
One of the various prototypes for the T-84. Included an air conditioner. Participated in Turkish trials.

T-84 (Object 478DU8)
One of the various prototypes for the T-84. Made for Malaysian trials. Track width was extended to 600 mm.

BM Oplot zr. 1999 and zr. 2000 (Object 478DU9)
The first serially produced T-84 variant. It features a new welded turret and Varta active protection system, similar to the Shtora-1 countermeasures suite, new electronics, Ukrainian produced version of the 2A46M-1 known as the KBA-3, new armor, and the 1,200 hp (895 kW) 6TD-2E diesel engine. In 2004, the Object 478DU9 was renamed to BM Oplot instead of T-84. Due to this, there are now several correct names, with T-84 referring specifically only to the earlier models of the vehicle and BM Oplot and BM Oplot zr (model) 1999 and 2000 being more proper names.

BM Oplot zr. 2008 and zr. 2009 (Object 478DU9-1)

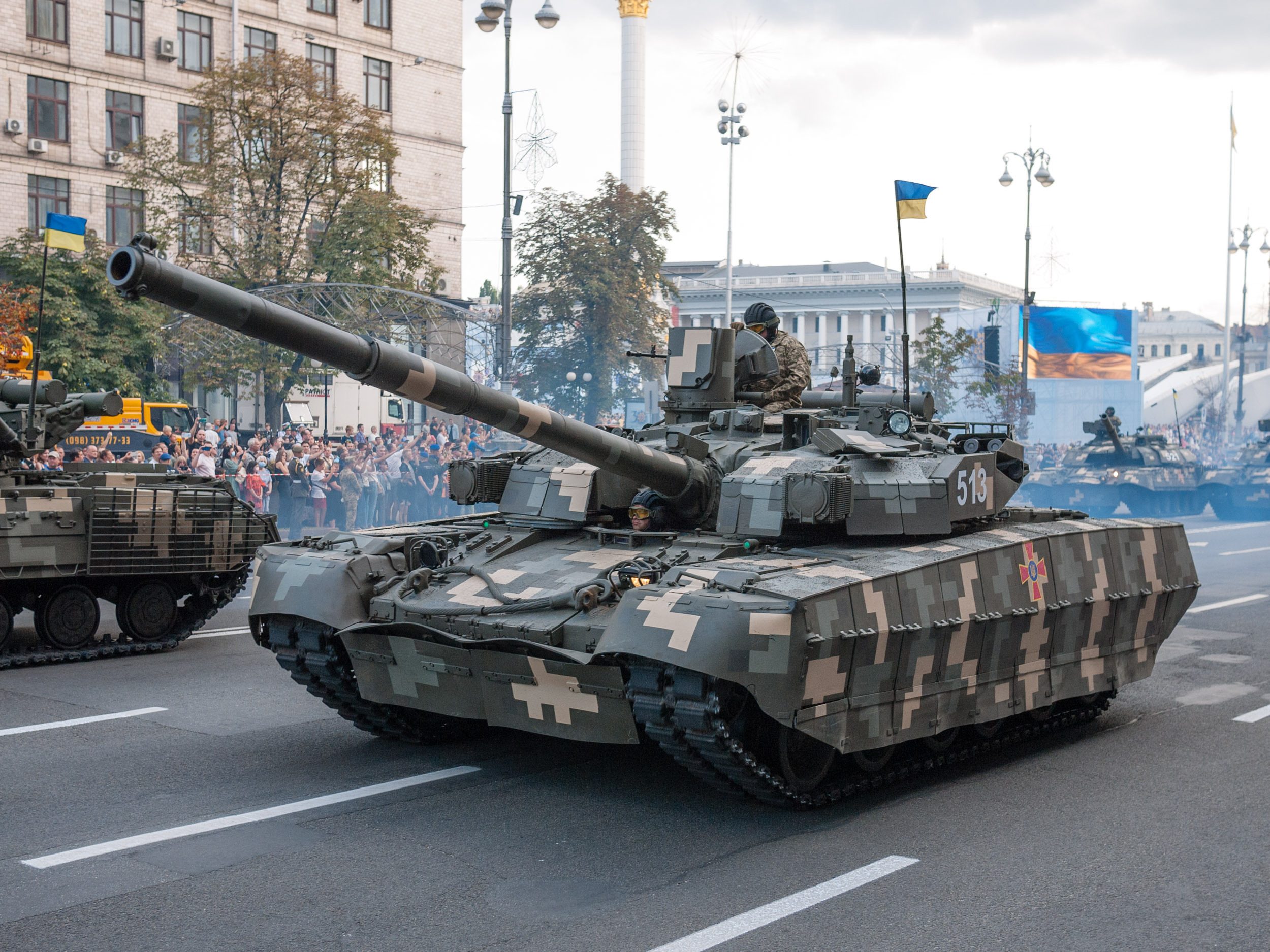
A BM Oplot model 2009

Colloquially known as Oplot-M; The newest and most sophisticated version of the T-84 is an upgraded version of the "T-84 Oplot" mounting more advanced armor, new electronics, and more. One visible feature is the new PNK-6 panoramic tank sight.

Oplot-T (Object 478DU9-T)
"BM Oplot-T" is an export version for Thailand. It has some minor modifications to meet local requirements, such as different radio, air conditioner and so on. Thailand ordered 49 of these tanks. Originally it was planned that all of them would be delivered by 2014. However, due to the Russo-Ukrainian war, the delivery was postponed to and completed in 2018.

Oplot-P
BM Oplot-P was a variant of the T-84 MBT based on the requirements of the Pakistan Armed forces. It featured a different armour layout as well as lighter ERA and a 360-degree thermal panoramic commanders sight.

Object 478DU10
Proposal for a more advanced variant of the BM Oplot (Object 478DU9-1). Object 478DU10 was also dubbed Oplot-2M. It was built in 2021, when a new Oplot tank was produced at the Malyshev Plant by order of Ukrspecexport, a state owned Ukrainian company part of Ukroboronprom. There were few differences between Oplot-2M/Object 478DU10 and the BM Oplot model 2009, though the main one stated by the general director of the tank plant, Vasyl Krylas, was that the vehicle was made cheaper to produce thanks to the manufacturers willing to supply parts at almost building cost while not sacrificing performance. The Oplot-2M was used for the celebration of Ukrainian independence day of 30 years, as well as to show to potential buyers, such as Egypt. The tank was later sold to a customer in the United States.

T-84-120 Yatagan (Object 478N)

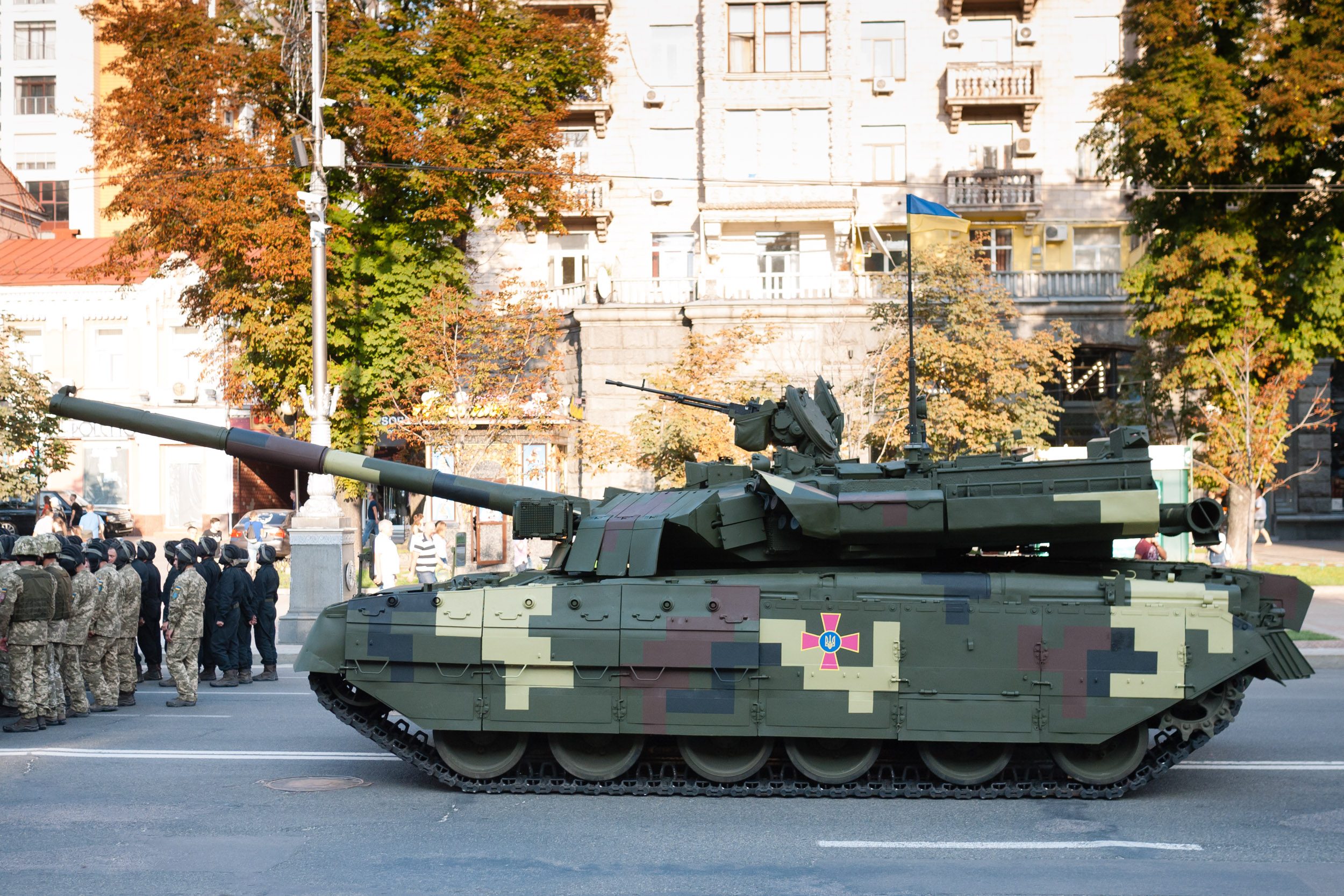
A T-84-120 Yatagan prototype.

A prototype version of Oplot tailored for evaluation by the Turkish Army (prototype designation, KERN2-120). Mounts a 120 mm main gun which fires both 120 mm NATO rounds (like the M829 DU series) and a special 120 mm version of the AT-11 Sniper ATGM. Most significantly, the Yatagan features a completely redesigned "Cassette style" bustle mounted autoloader, similar to the ones used on Leclerc and K2 Black Panther, replacing the Soviet-era carousel autoloader. This redesign allows all ammunition in the ready-rack to be separated from the crew and equipped with blowout panels, features considered standard for NATO MBTs. It also has automated gear shifting in place of a mechanical gear selector, driver's T-bar control replacing tiller bars, air conditioning, and projectile muzzle velocity sensor, and differences in the fire control system, communications, etc.
Object 478N1

Planned production variant of the T-84-120

BREM-84 Atlet (Object 478BP)
Armoured recovery vehicle based on the T-84 Oplot chassis.

BREM-T
Armoured recovery vehicle based on the T-84 Oplot-T chassis.

BMU-84
Armoured vehicle-launched bridge.

BTMP-84
Heavy infantry fighting vehicle prototype based on the T-84 Oplot tank, with lengthened hull, an extra pair of road wheels, and a rear compartment for five infantrymen.

== Service history ==
=== Ukraine ===
The first T-84 prototype vehicle rolled out in 1994, and in the same year it was decided to build several more vehicles. They were subjected to extensive company and army trials. After successful completion of the extensive trials programme in the late 1990s the T-84 entered service with the Ukrainian Army in 1999.

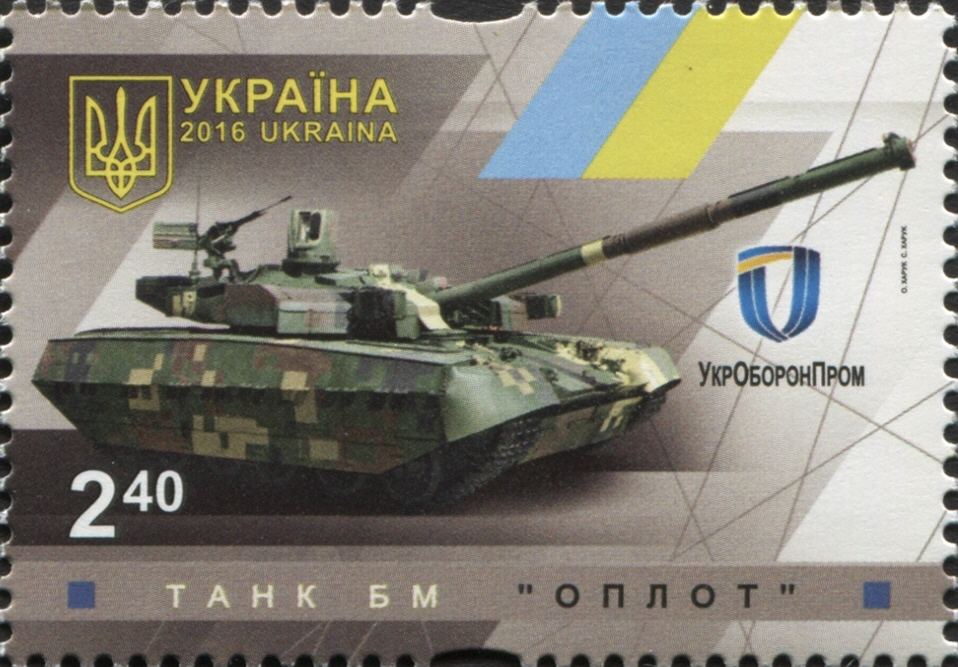
A Ukrainian stamp depicting the BM Oplot.

During the Russian invasion of Ukraine, at least one T-84 was deployed with the 3rd Tank Brigade in Donbas, near Barvinkove and Slovyansk. T-84 tanks were believed to be deployed with the 14th Mechanized Brigade in Donbas.

=== Thailand ===
In March 2011, the Royal Thai Army placed an order for 49 Oplot-T to replace its fleet of aging M41A3 Walker Bulldog light tanks. In September 2011, the Malyshev Plant announced plans to produce the first batch of five Oplot-T tanks for the Thai Army by the end of the year. Under the contract, the Ukrainian company will make 49 tanks worth over US$200 million.

The government approved 7.155 billion baht to purchase the first 49 Oplot tanks to be assigned to several units: the 2nd Cavalry battalion (Royal Guard at Fort Chakrabongse, Prachinburi), the 4th Cavalry battalion (Royal Guard at Kiakkai, Bangkok), the 8th Cavalry battalion (Fort Suranari, Nakhon Ratchasima), and the 9th Cavalry battalion (Fort Ekathotsarot, Phitsanuloke).

In April 2017, it was reported that following the delayed deliveries from this tank, the Royal Thai Army was expected to decline the remainder of the sale and acquired the Chinese VT-4 main battle tank instead of the Ukrainian tank, due to the long term delivery schedule. The signed order for 49 units had to be completed by the month of January, 2017, it was reported that other deliveries may not be expected.

A 26 March 2018 press release by Ukroboronprom stated that the 2011 contract for supplying Oplot-T tanks to Thailand had successfully completed and that the last party of tanks had passed checks by the customers and would be sent to the buyer in the near future.

During the 2025 Cambodia–Thailand clashes, Royal Thai Army T-84 Oplots saw combat during an attack at Boeung Trakoan on the Thai-Cambodia border. A video published by the Thai side showed T-84 Oplots attacking a Cambodian customs office/casino den.

== Operators ==
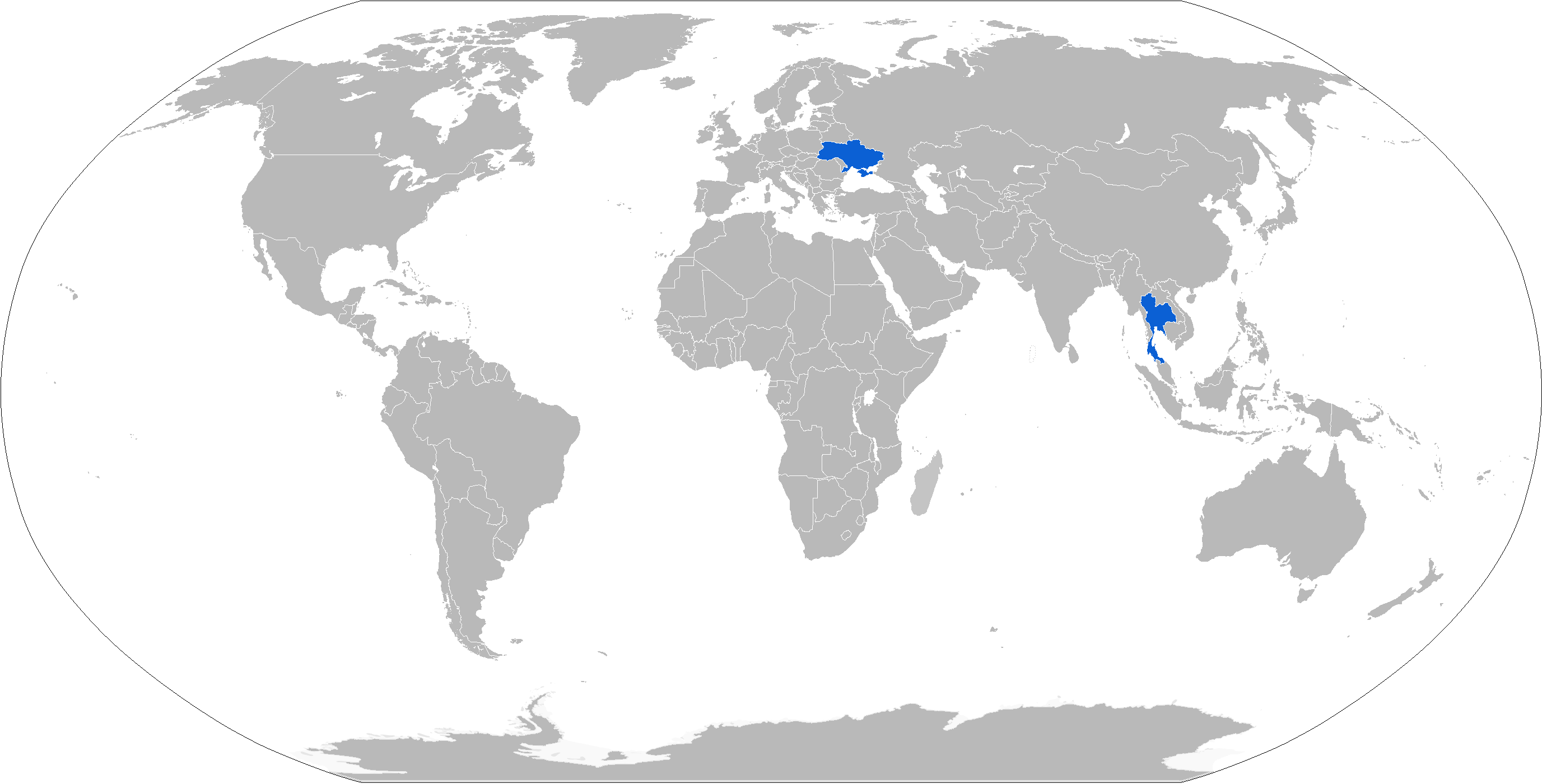
A map of T-84 operators in blue

=== Current operators ===
- Ukraine

The Ukrainian Ground Forces reportedly had 6 T-84 in service as of 2021, but the current number is unknown. Battlefield footage published in early 2023 indicates least one of the tanks was possibly damaged by a Russian-made ZALA Lancet drone.

On May 12, 2023, Defense Minister Reznikov drove an Oplot at a training ground in Kharkiv Oblast and subsequently announced that the Armed forces of Ukraine would order an unspecified number of Oplots.

- Thailand

According to The Military Balance 2019, Thailand had acquired 49 Oplot-T(Object 478DU9-T) main battle tanks.

=== Evaluation-only operators ===
- United States

5 total:
- 3 Object 478BEM1- A modified version of Object 478DU9 (Service Oplots also known as BM Oplot zr. 1999 and 2000) that had the IRCM replaced with smoke grenades and the Drozd hard kill active protection system installed. One of these vehicles was spotted during transport in May 2025.
- 1 Object 478BEM2- Similar to the above vehicle, the main difference was having an air conditioner instead of the Drozd active protection system. Pictures of it during thermal tests have surfaced from 2021. Both it and the above vehicles are commonly referred to as T-80UDs.
- 1 BM Oplot-T (Object 478DU9-T) - This vehicle was sold to the United States in 2021.

=== Failed bids ===
- Azerbaijan

In January 2011, Azerbaijan showed interest in the Oplot main battle tank. The Defense Ministry of Ukraine has long been holding negotiations on this issue. In June 2013, it has been made public that Azerbaijan had instead purchased 100 Russian T-90 tanks, in a series of rearmament deals worth $4 billion with Russia.

- Malaysia

The T-84 Yatagan was offered to the Malaysian Army in 2002. But the contract was lost to the Polish PT-91.

- Peru

In 2009, Peru reportedly tested the Oplot tank, but the government of Alan Garcia later decided to acquire test examples of the Chinese MBT-2000 in late 2010, only to have the government of his successor, Ollanta Humala, abandon the purchase in early 2012 to seek other alternatives. In May 2013, the T-84 was reported to be part of comparative tests to be conducted by Peru. The T-84 competed against the T-90S, the M1A1 Abrams, the Leopard 2A4 and A6, and the T-64 also offered by Ukraine. By September 2013, only the T-84, T-90S, Russian T-80, and M1A1 Abrams were still competing. Ultimately no decision to order was reached, and South Korean built K2 Black Panther tanks were ordered in 2025.

- Pakistan

In 2017, Ukraine was in talks with Pakistan for the potential sale of 100 Oplot tanks. Though Pakistan evaluated the Oplot in 2015-2017, it selected the VT-4 main battle tank instead. However later on, Heavy Industries Taxila and Ukrspecexport signed a MoU worth $600 million to upgrade the existing fleet of Pakistan's T-80UD MBTs possibly to Oplot-M standard.

== Gallery ==
Object 478 at National Museum of the History of Ukraine in the Second World War, Kyiv:

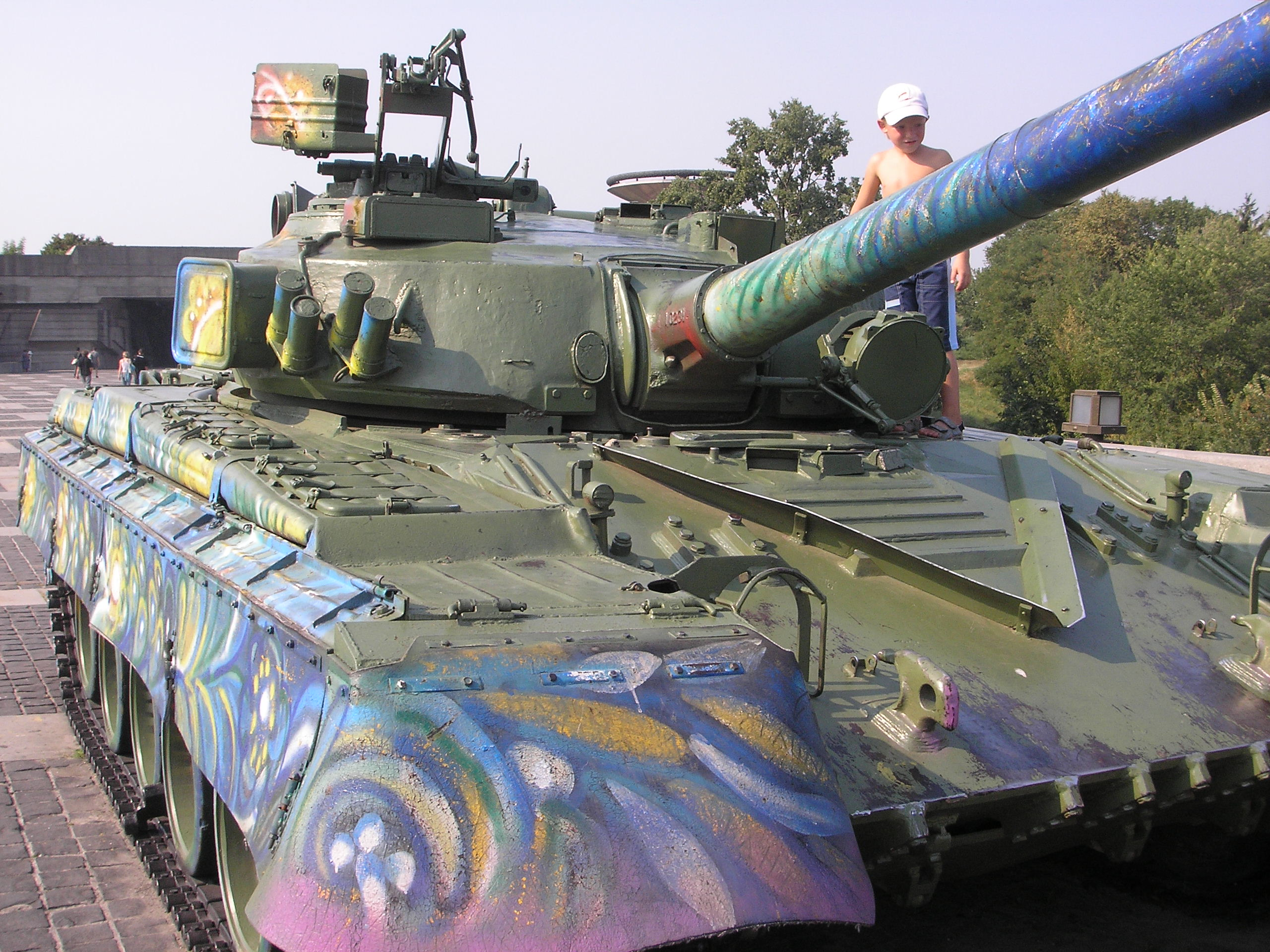

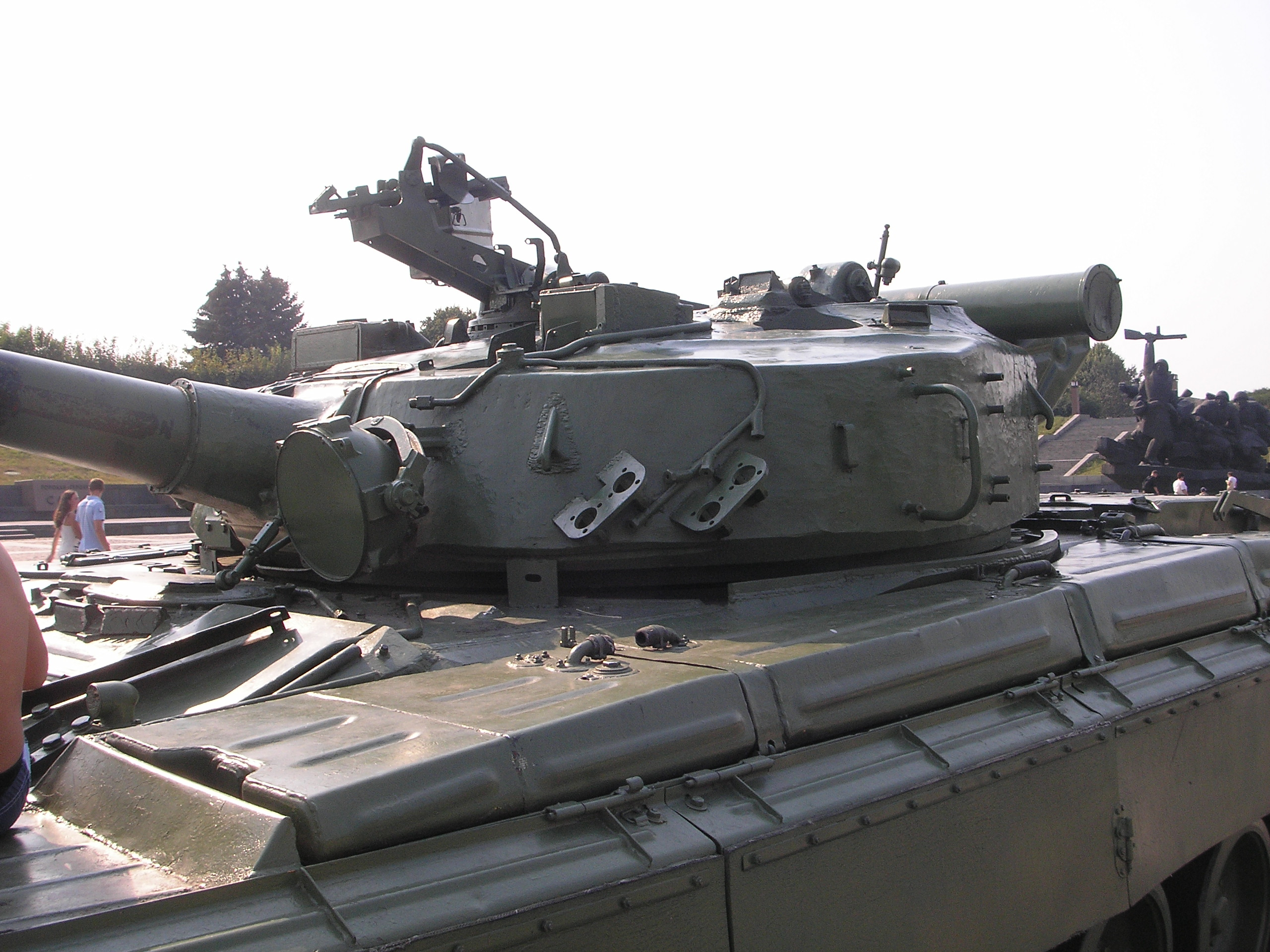

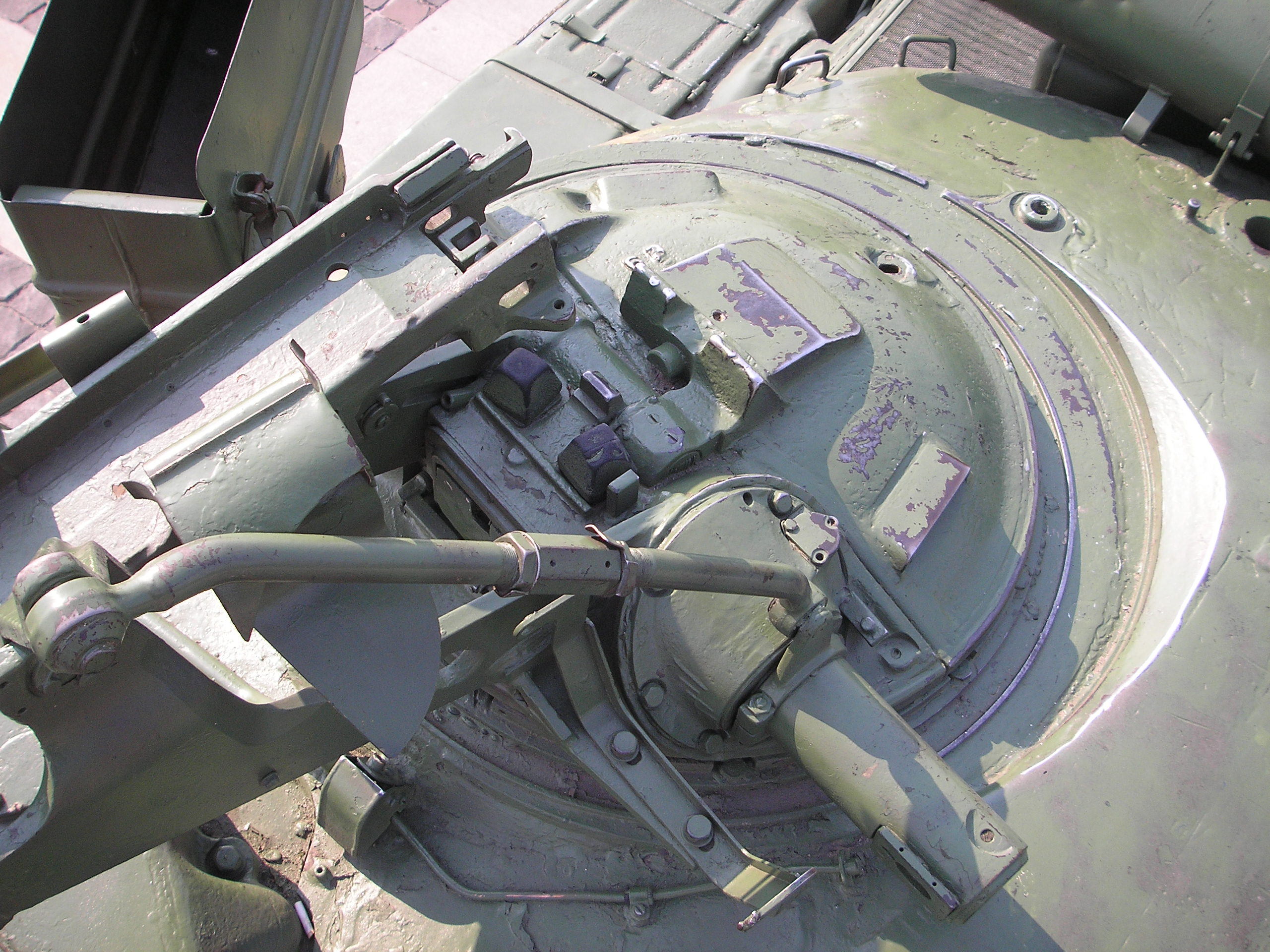

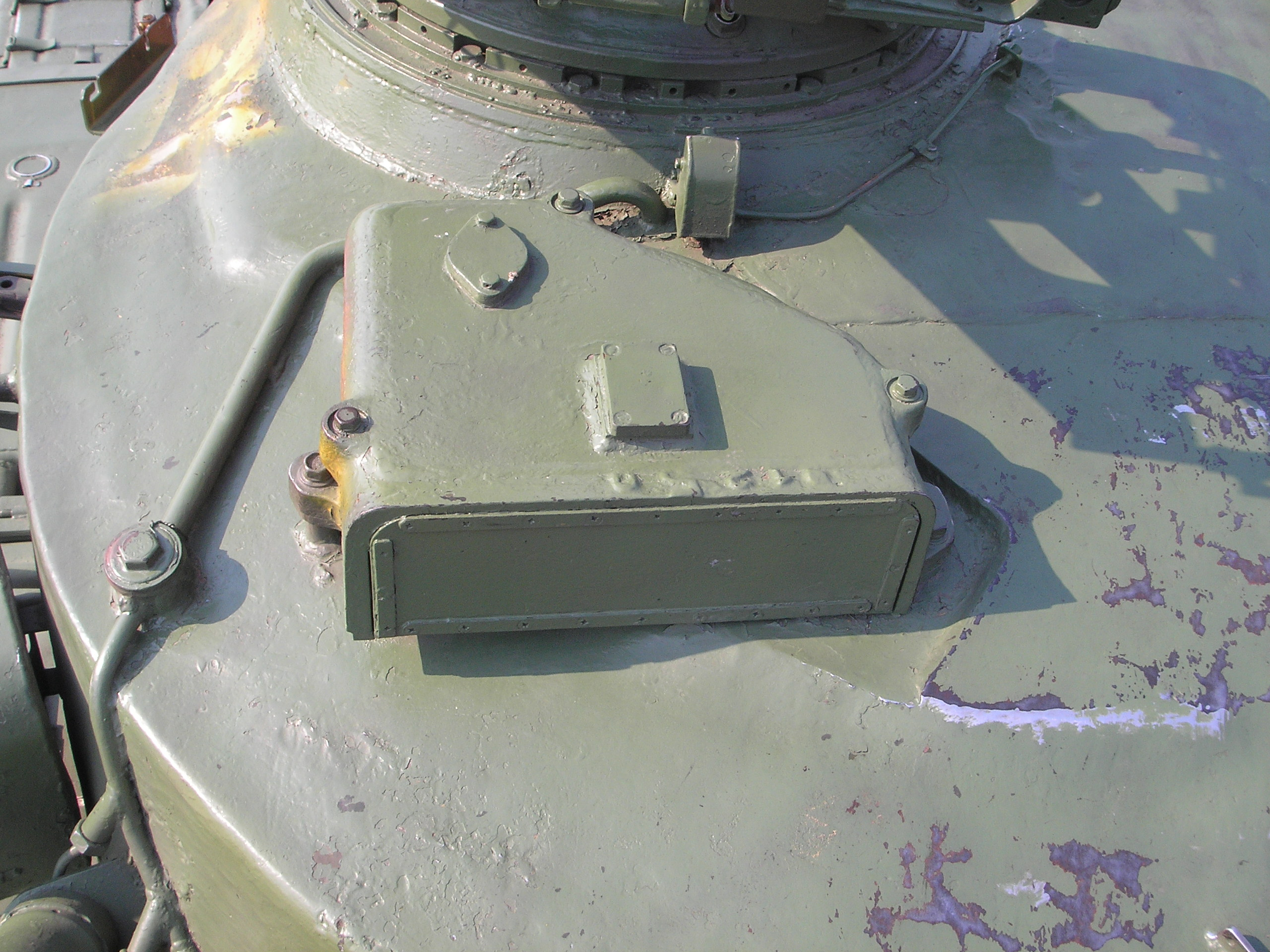

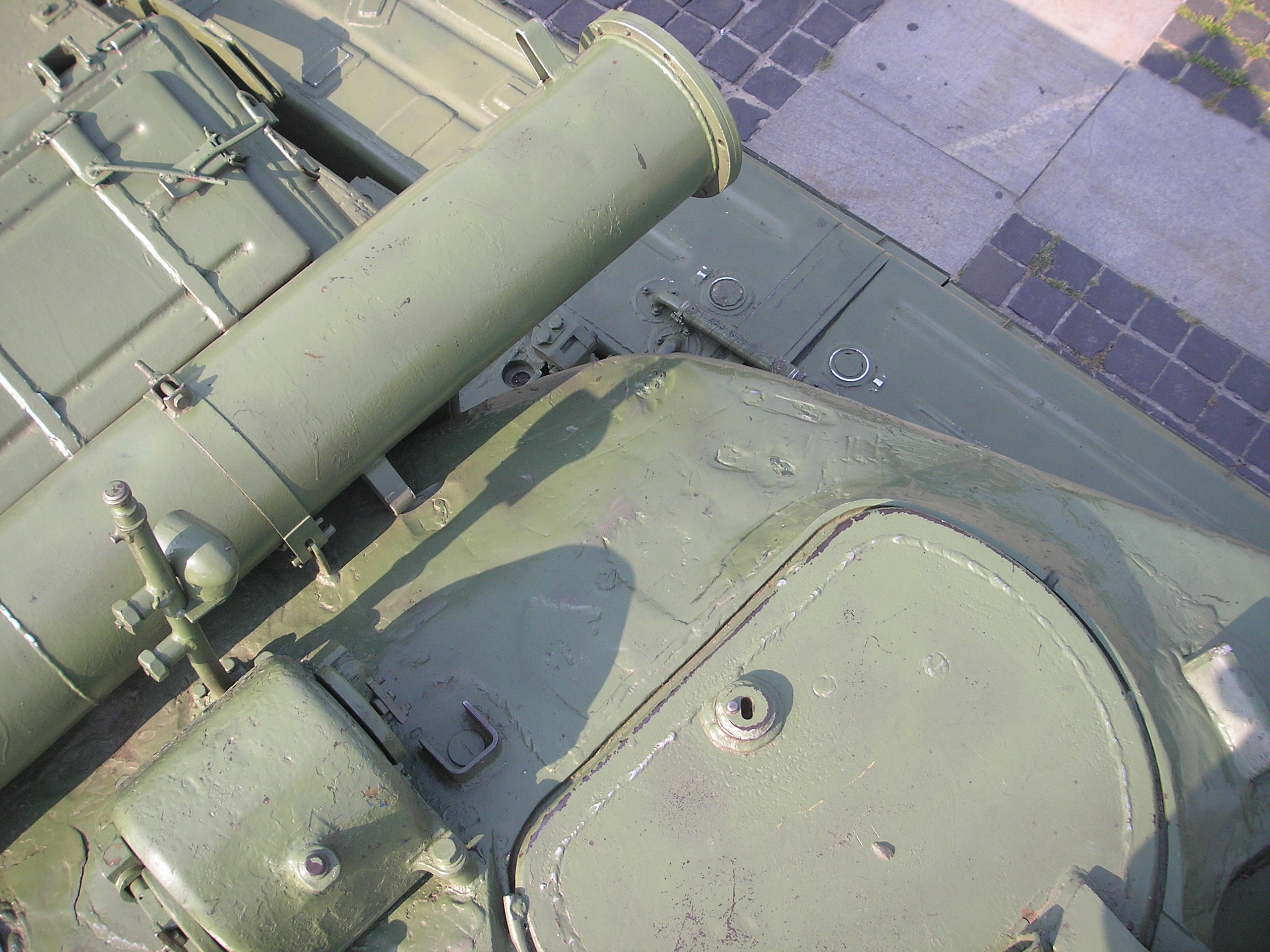

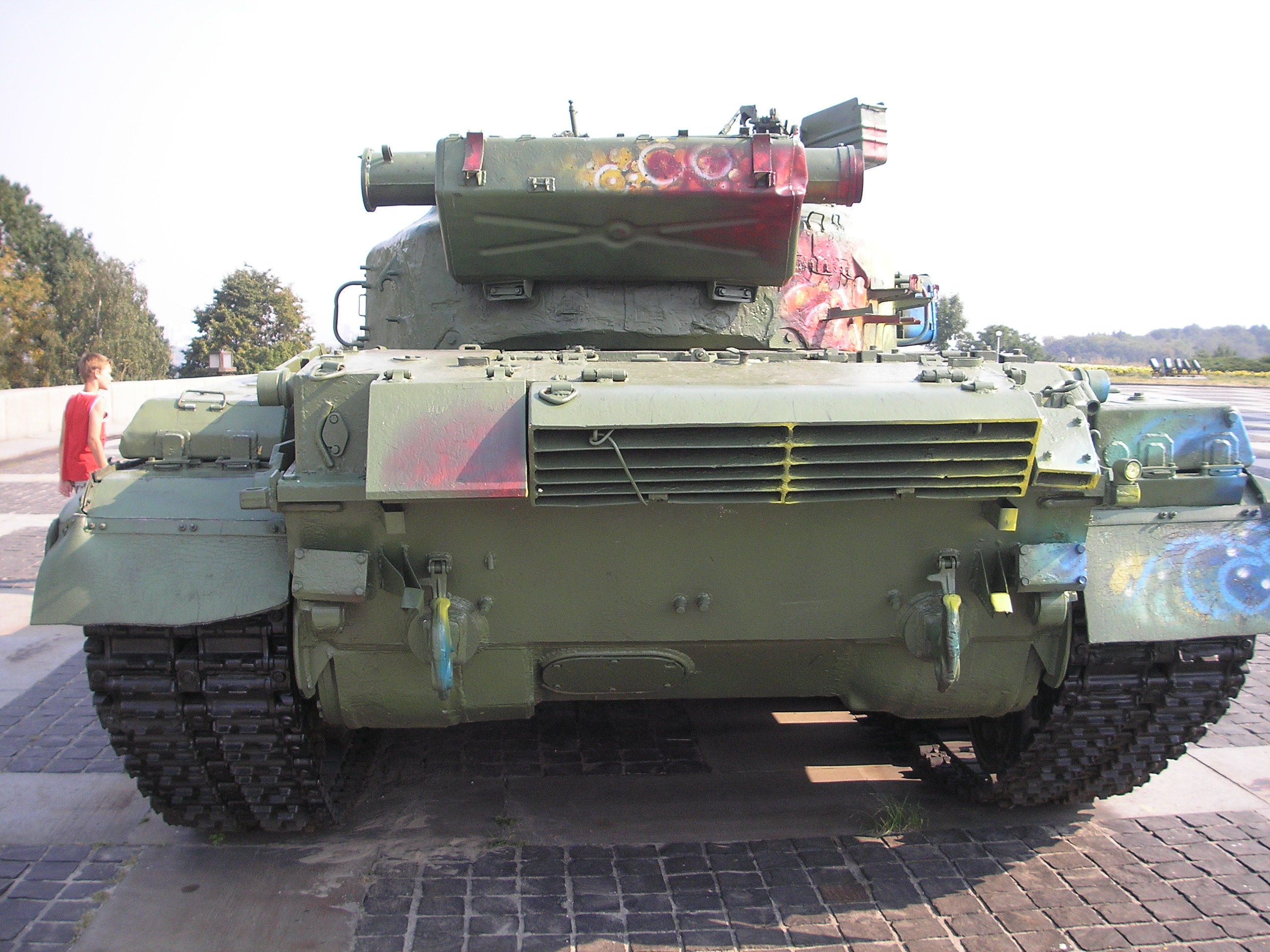

== See also ==
- PT-91M
- M-84AS
- M-95 Degman
- Karrar
- T-72M4CZ
- T-80BVM
- T-90
- Type 99 tank
- TR-125
- T-72 tanks in Iraqi service

== Sources ==
- Zaloga, Steven J.; Markov, David (2000). Russia's T-80U Main Battle Tank. Hong Kong: Concord Publications. ISBN 962-361-656-2.
- Zaloga, Steven J. (17 February 2009). T-80 Standard Tank: The Soviet Army's Last Armored Champion. Osprey Publishing, New Vanguard. ISBN 978-1-84603-244-8.
