= M-84D =

M84D
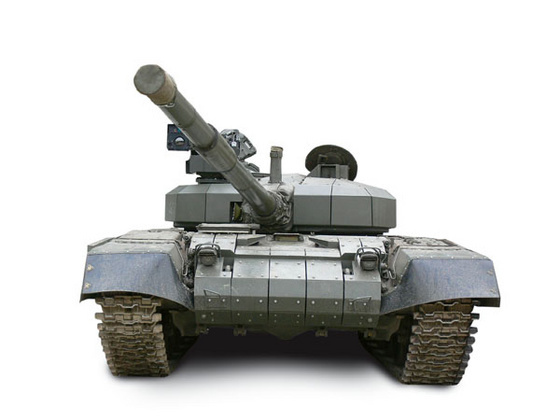
- M-84D Main Battle Tank
- Type: Main battle tank
- Place of origin: Croatia

Production history
- Manufacturer: Đuro Đaković specijalna vozila d.d.
- No. built: +2 prototypes

Specifications
- Mass: 45 tonnes without reactive armour, 48.5 tonnes
- Length: 10.1 m (33 ft 2 in)
- Width: 3.6 m (11 ft 10 in)
- Height: 2.2 m (7 ft 3 in)
- Crew: 3 (commander, driver and gunner)
- Armor: Composite armour plus Reactive armour
- Main armament: 125mm 2A46M5 smoothbore gun (42 shells, 22 in automatic loader)
- Secondary armament: Kongsberg Protector (RWS)
- Engine: 12-cyl. diesel 1,000 hp (750 kW)
- Power/weight: 27 hp/tonne
- Transmission: two gear-boxes with side transmission in gear-box axes
- Suspension: independent, with torsion bars, 6 hydraulic dampers, 6 road wheels and 3 return rollers per side
- Ground clearance: 428 mm (16.9 in)
- Operational range: 700 km (430 mi)
- Maximum speed: 70 km/h (43 mph)
- Steering system: hydraulic

The Croatian M-84D, also known as the M-84A5 (D), is a proposed upgrade variant of existing M-84 tanks, originally developed in Yugoslavia, with improvements to engine, armor, armament and electronics.

== Description ==
The M-84D is equipped with a new 1,200 hp (895 kW) engine and new RRAK ERA armour. It can carry either a Rafael Samson or a Kongsberg Protector (RWS) Remote Controlled Weapon Station, and has a new Omega ballistic computer (Slovenian Fotona-made digital ballistic computer). It has an electric cupola, giving it ability to fire at multiple targets in fast sequence, and a new SDZ defence suite protects the crew from biological, chemical and nuclear strikes.

The M-84D night vision capability is provided by advanced thermal imaging sensors and cameras providing the tank with night fighting capability as well as ability to see through fog, in shade, and during a storm, i.e. greatly reduced visibility. It is equipped with the latest Racal communication suite, which now comes as standard on all new M84D and M84A4 tanks. The M-84A4 and M-84D have an operational range of 700 km and a maximum speed of 65 km/h. Improvements and new auto loader have increased efficiency by 15%, meaning 9 shells per minute instead of 8 shells per minute.

The M-84D is a second version of the upgraded tanks. It has also chains on the back of the tank to protect the engine and has SLAT armour around the ammunition to prevent an ATG or a shell from hitting it. M-84D received few additional upgrades, turret basket was added to provide extra space for extra ammunition and to provide increased armour protection. Turret basket has additional slat armour, which adds additional armour to the exterior of the tank. M84D and M84A4 are to receive 12.7mm Kongsberg Protector Remote Weapon Stations which are to be integrated on to all M84D and M84A4 tanks. M-84D will also feature LIRD-4B - Laser irradiation detector and warner and LAHAT anti tank missiles.

== Difference between the M-95 Degman and M-84D ==
The M-84D is a direct successor of the M-84A4, while the M-95 Degman is a revision of a project codenamed M-90 Vihor (which had two prototypes built). M-90 Vihor was a Yugoslav prototype, made by cooperation of 30 companies from all Yugoslav republics. At the emergence of civil war and break-up of Yugoslavia, Croatian authorities seized two prototypes, which have been renamed to M-95 Degman, after the war ended. While the first prototype was fully assembled (though missing some electronics and loading system), the second prototype had only its body assembled. After the war, the second prototype was assembled with derived turret, new tracks produced by Diehl (who also produce tracks for the German Leopard 2) and some electronic upgrades.

M-95 Degman (M-90 Vihor) prototypes will most probably remain as prototypes since its turret caster Slovenske Železarne destroyed molds for its turret. Also most of documentation is held by the Serbian Military Institute of Technology, and neither Croatia nor Serbia is financially capable of funding completion of this project.

== Potential clients ==
- Croatia: Croatian Army 16 M-84A4 tanks were to be upgraded to the M-84A5 (D) standard by the end of 2016, but there are no plans for future acquisition. 0 M84A4 were upgraded to M84D standard as of 2024.
- Kuwait: The Kuwaiti Army planned modernization of 149 Kuwaiti M84AB tanks to M-84D standard, but as of April 2011 this deal has been stalled since 2007. Order was canceled. M84 To be replaced By T90MS.

== Similar tanks ==
- M-95 Degman
