= 2A46 125 mm gun =

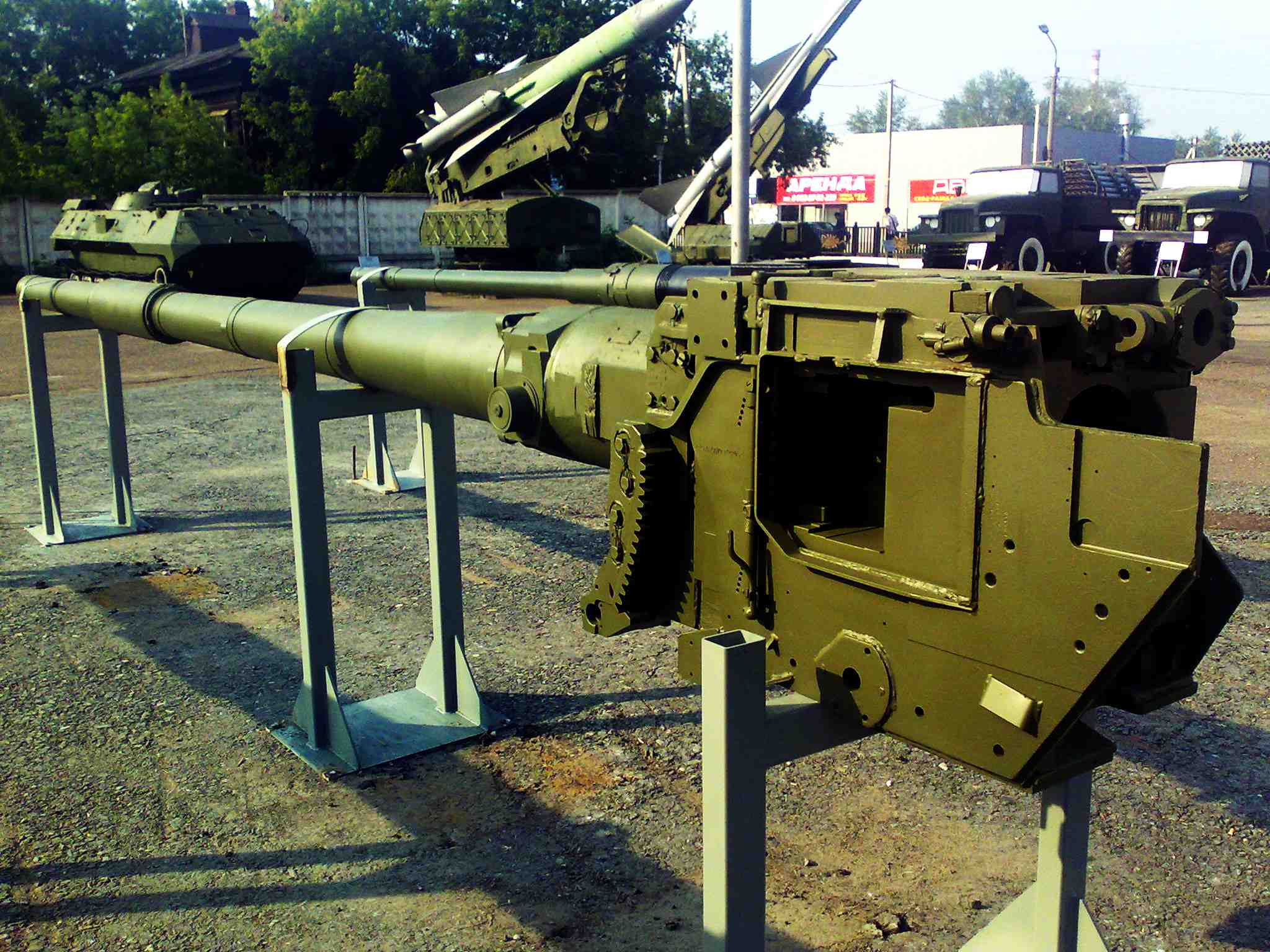
- 2A46M-1 in Motovilikha Plants museum
- Type: Smoothbore tank gun
- Place of origin: Soviet Union

Service history
- In service: Since 1970

Production history
- Designer: Spetstekhnika Design Bureau
- Produced: 1970–present

Specifications
- Mass: 2A46: 2,675 kg 2A46M: 2,400 kg
- Length: 2A46: 6,350 mm 2A46M: 6,381 mm
- Barrel length: 6,000 mm L48
- Caliber: 125 mm (4.9 in)
- Muzzle velocity: APFSDS: 1,715-1,800 m/s HEAT: 905-950 m/s HE: 760 m/s
- Effective firing range: APFSDS / HEAT: 3,000 m HE: 4,000 m ATGM: 5,000 m

The 2A46 (also called D-81TM) is a 125 mm/L48 smoothbore cannon of Soviet origin used in several main battle tanks. It was designed by OKB-9 (Artillery Plant No. 9) in Yekaterinburg.

== Description ==
It was developed by the Spetstekhnika Design Bureau in Ekaterinburg in the 1960s originally for the T-64 tank. They were subsequently manufactured at Artillery Plant No. 9 in Ekaterinburg and Motovilikha in Perm. Other variations include 2A46M, 2A46M-1, 2A46M-2, 2A46M-4, 2A46M-5, and Ukrainian KBA-3 and Chinese ZPT-98.

The 2A46 can fire armour-piercing fin-stabilised discarding sabot (APFSDS), high-explosive anti-tank (HEAT) and high-explosive fragmentation (HEF) projectiles. The ammunition for the 2A46 gun is in two pieces: the projectile is loaded first, followed by a separate propellant charge.

The early versions of the 2A46 suffered from a relatively short barrel life, but this was rectified on the 2A46M-1 version. Depending on the version it offers 510.0 MPa (73,970 psi) or from the 2A46M-1 650.0 MPa (94,270 psi) P_{max} chamber pressure.

The Ukrainian KBA-3 guns are based on the 2A46 gun. In addition, the Chinese ZPT-98 is based on 2A46M imported from Russia's T-72 or T-80.

== Projectiles ==
Projectile specifications for 2A46 and 2A46M; Note: There are different ways to measure penetration value. NATO uses the 50% (This means that 50% of the projectile had to go through the plate), while the Soviet/Russia standard is higher (80% had to go through). According to authorities like Paul Lakowski, the difference in performance can reach as much as 8%
Round index	Projectile index	Charge index	Round weight, kg	Projectile weight, kg	Charge weight, kg	Penetration, mm/deg (Note: Standard RHA plates at 2000 m)
APFSDS Rounds (Soviet Union/Russia)
3VBM3	3BM9/3BM10	4Zh40	19.6	5.67	5.0/5.0+3.4	245 mm/0°, 140 mm/60° @ 2 km
3VBM6	3BM12/3BM13	4Zh40	19.6	5.67	5.0/5.0+3.4	380 mm/0°, 140 mm/60° @ 2 km
3VBM7	3BM15/3BM16	4Zh40	20.0	5.9	5.0/5.0+3.4	400 mm/0°, 150 mm/60° @ 2 km
3VBM8	3BM17/3BM18	4Zh40	20.0	5.9	5,0/5,0+3,4	265 mm/0°, 150 mm/60° @ 2 km
3VBM9	3BM22/3BM23	4Zh40	20.2	6.55	5,0/5,0+3,4	420 mm/0°, 170 mm/60° @ 2 km
3VBM11	3BM26/3BM27	4Zh63	20.43	7.05	5.3/5.3+2.9	410 mm/0°, 200 mm/60° @ 2 km
3VBM12	3BM29/3BM30			6.55		360 mm /0°, 210 mm/60° @ 2 km
3VBM13	3BM32/3BM38	4Zh63	20.55	7.05	5.3/5.3+2.9	395 mm/0°, 230 mm/60° @ 2 km
3VBM17	3BM42/3BM44 ("Mango")	4Zh63	20.4	7.05	5.3/5.3+2.9	450 mm/0°, 230 mm/60° @ 2 km
—-	3BM44-2 (“Mango-2”)					480 mm/0°, 280 mm/60° @ 2 km
3VBM19	3BM42M/3BM44M ("Lekalo")	4Zh63	20.4	7.05	5.3/5.3+2.9
3VBM20	3BM46/3BM48 ("Svinets")	4Zh63	20.4	7.05	5.3/5.3+2.9	495 mm/0°, 290 mm/60° @ 2 km
3VBM22	3BM59 ("Svinets-1")			8.8		315 mm/60° @ 2 km
3VBM23	3BM60 ("Svinets-2")			8.1		300 mm/60° @ 2 km
Other APFSDS rounds
TAPNA (Note: Slovak domestic round)			20.0	7.15	5.5/5.5+3.3	540 mm/0°, 270 mm/60° @ 2 km
ZPS Pronit (Note: Polish variant)		4Zh63			5.855/5.855+3.0	430 mm/0°, 250 mm/60° @ 2 km
125-I (Note: Chinese variant)			23.0	7.37		430 mm/0°, 250 mm/60° @ 2 km
125-II / DTW-125			23.0	7.44		515 mm/0°, 300 mm/60° @ 2 km
125-III / DTC10-125						330 mm/60° @ 2 km
HEAT Rounds
3VBK7	3BK12(M)	4Zh40	29.0	19.0	5.0	220/60°
3VBK10	3BK14(M)	4Zh40	29.0	19.0	5.0	220/60°
3VBK16	3BK18(M)	4Zh40	29.0	19.0	5.0	260/60°
3VBK17	3BK21B	4Zh52	29.0	19.0	10.0	260/60°
3VBK25	3BK29(M)	4Zh52	28.4	18.4	10.0	300/60°
3VBK27	3BK31			19.0		350/60° (Note: ERA armor.)
125-mm HEAT (Note: Bulgarian variant)				19.0		200/60°
125-mm HEAT-T (Note: Iranian variant)			33.0	23.0	10,0
125-mm HEAT-T				19.5		200/60°
M88 (Note: Yugoslavian variant)
HE Rounds
3VOF22	3OF19	4Zh40	33.0	23.0	5.0	—
3VOF36	3OF26	4Zh40	33.0	23.0	5.0	—
Practice HEAT Rounds
3VP5	3P11	4Zh40	29.0	19.0	5.0
Practice APFSDS Rounds
3VP6	3P31/3P35	4Zh40	19.5	5.2	5.0/5.0+4.3	—
Practice HE Rounds
3VP24	3P23	4Zh40	33.0	23.0	5.0	—
Training Rounds
3VPU4	3PU12	4PU105	19.1	9.6		—
3VPU5	3PU13	4PU105	28.5	19.0		—
3VPU6	3PU14	4PU105	32.5	23.0		—
Inert	—	4Kh33	—	—	13	—
Guided weapons for 2A46-2, 2A46M and their variants
ATGMs
	9M112	9D129	33.2			250/60°
	9M112M					300/60°
	9M112M2		31.1	24		300..350/60°
	9M124		33.6	27.9		450/60°
3UBK14	9M119	9Kh949	23.3	16.5	7.1	325..375/60°
	Sokol-1	4Zh63		23.0	5.3	350/60°
Explosive ATGMs
3UBK14F	9M119F	9Kh949	23.6	16.5	7.1	—
3UBK14F1	9M119F1	9Kh949	23.3	16.5	6.8	—
Guided weapons for 2A46M and its variants
3UBK20	9M119M	9Kh949	24.3	17.2	7.1	325..375/60°
3UBK20M	9M119M1	9Kh949	24.3	17.2	7.1	425..450/60°
AP projectiles for 2A46M-5
3VBM22	3BM59	4Zh96				540/0° @ 2 km
3VBM23	3BM60	4Zh96				515/0° @ 2 km
???	3BM69
???	3BM70

== Variants ==
=== Soviet Union and Russia ===
- 2A46 (1963): Used on T-64, T-64A and T-72. Basic model, connected to either AZ-172 or MZ-610 autoloaders with 2E23 or 2E28 hydroelectric gun stabilisers that both utilise the TPD FCS, with BV-72 or BV-64 mechanical ballistic calculators, that can fire 3BM15 APFSDS, 3OF19 HE-FRAG-FS or 3BK14 HEAT-FS.
- 2A46-1 (1976): Used on T-72A. Connected to AZ-172 electromechanical autoloader and the 2E28M2 gun stabiliser that utilises the TPD-K digitised FCS that can fire 3BM22 Zakolka, 3BM26 Nadezhda-R and 3BM29 Nadphil-2 APFSDS, 3OF26 HE-FRAG-FS or 3BK18 HEAT-FS.
- 2A46-2 (1973): Used on T-64B and T-80. The first "modern gun" of the series, with basic barrel sensors fitted for the 1A33 digital FCS with the 1V517 8x bit digital ballistic computer, connected to MZ-640 hydromechanical autoloaders and 2E26 or 2E28 hydroelectric gun stabilizers and can fire 3BM22 Zakolka, 3BM26 Nadezhda-R and 3BM29 Nadphil-2 APFSDS, 3OF26 HE-FRAG-FS or 3BK18 HEAT-FS as well as radio guided 3UBK12 Kobra GLATGM.
- 2A46M (1983): Used on T-72B. Mobilization model of the 2A46M-1, made for fast build T-72Bs to allow firing of more advanced munitions without added fire control additions for better accuracy. Added a thermal sleeve and connected to 1A40-1 digitised FCS with a 1V510 4x bit digital ballistic computer utilising the AZ-184 digitally controlled electromechanical autoloader and the 2E42 digitally assisted hydroelectric gun stabiliser and can fire 3BM42 Mango and 3BM32 Vant APFSDS, 3OF26 HE-FRAG-FS, 3BK29 Breyk HEAT-FS and 3UBK14 Svir GLATGM.
- 2A46M-1 (1983): Used on T-64BV, T-80BV and T-80U. The first real modernization, with more sophisticated gun and barrel sensors being added, a muzzle reference system would not be added as it's thought that by designers that internal position and temperature sensors combined with a thermal sleeve would be enough for enhanced accuracy, whilst long range shooting was dealt with the guided gun launched ATGMs. Improved barrel sensors that connect to 1A45 and 1A33-1 digital FCS with the 1V528 16x bit digital ballistic computer connected to MZ-643 digitally controlled hydromechanical autoloader and the 2E42M1 digitally assisted hydroelectric gun stabiliser and can fire 3BM42 Mango and 3BM32 Vant APFSDS, 3OF26 HE-FRAG-FS, 3BK29 Breyk HEAT-FS and 3UBK14 Svir GLATGM. (said to be the first Rh-120 analogue)
- 2A46M-2 (1989): Used on T-72S, T-72BA, T-72B3 and T-90 tanks. A simple upgrade. Allows for firing of 3BM48 Svinets APFSDS and the 3Sh7 Voron Anti Personnel Canister and is connected to the 1A40-2, 1A40-M2, 1A40-4 and 1A45T fully digital FCS utilising the 1V528 16x bit, 1V558 32x bit, Sosna-U 32x bit and 1V528-1 32x bit digital ballistic computers, all connected to the AZ-184 digitally controlled electromechanical autoloader and the 2E42-4 digitally assisted hydroelectric gun stabiliser and can fire laser guided 3UBK14M Refleks.
- 2A46M-3 (1990): Used on T-80UK and T-80UM. Allows for firing of 3BM48 Svinets APFSDS and the 3Sh7 Voron Anti Personnel Canister and is connected to the 1A45M and 1A45T fully digital FCS utilising the 1V528 16x bit and 1V528-2 32x bit digital ballistic computers using the MZ-643 digitally controlled hydromechanical autoloader and the 2E42-4 digitally assisted hydroelectric gun stabiliser and can fire laser guided 3UBK14M Refleks.
- 2A46M-4 (1995): Used on T-80BVM and Object 640. A more substantial upgrade with complete overhaul of internal sensors and barrel, with more durable materials used to greatly increase MPa. Utilises the 1A33-4 fully digital FCS with the Sosna-U 32x bit digital ballistic computer utilising the MZ-643A fully digitally assisted hydromechanical autoloader and the 2E42-4 digitally assisted hydroelectric or the 2E58 fully digital electromechanical gun stabiliser and allows for firing of 3BM44M Lekalko, 3BM59 Svinets-1 and 3BM60 Svinets-2 APFSDS, 3BK31 Start HEAT-FS, 3Sh8 Ainet Anti Personnel Canister, 3OF26M HE-FRAG-FS and laser guided 3UBK20 Invar, along with more sophisticated connections for 1A33-4 FCS.
- 2A46M-5 (1999): Used on T-90A, T-72M1M and T-72B3M. A more substantial upgrade with complete overhaul of internal sensors and barrel, with more durable materials used to greatly increase MPa. Utilises the 1A45T, 1A48 and 1A40-4 fully digital FCS using the 1V528-1, 1V558 and Sosna-U 32x bit digital ballistic computers all connected to the AZ-184A fully digital electromechanical autoloader and the 2E42-4 digitally assisted hydroelectric or the 2E58 fully digital electromechanical gun stabiliser and allows for firing of 3BM44M Lekalko, 3BM59 Svinets-1 and 3BM60 Svinets-2 APFSDS, 3BK31 Start HEAT-FS, 3Sh8 Ainet Anti Personnel Canister, 3OF26M HE-FRAG-FS and laser guided 3UBK20 Invar, along with more sophisticated connections for 1A45T, 1A48 or 1A40-4 FCS.
- 2A46M-1M (2016): Used on T-90M (2A82-1M offshoot, Utilises the Kalina/Proryv-3 all digital FCS (Armata downgrade for T-90M) with a 64x bit digital ballistic computer connected to AZ-185M2 fully digital electromechanical autoloader with the 2E58 fully digital electromechanical gun stabiliser, with advanced barrel sensors for the Kalina/Proryv-3 FCS and a dynamic MRS on top for firing 3BM69 Vacuum-2 and 3BM70 Vacuum-1 at long range with an added ammunition data link to fire the programmable 3VOF128 Telnik round)
- 2A82-1M (2014): Used on T-14 Armata. A Generational leap, completely new gun with the addition of a ammunition data link for programmable firings, sensors that allow the firing of radar and IR guided gun missiles and lastly a dynamic MRS for the firing of long range APFSDS and reducing the need for more regular boresighting, utilises the Kalina-Armata all digital FCS using the 1V577 64x bit digital ballistic computer connected to AZ-185 fully digital electromechanical autoloader with the 2E60 fully digital electromechanical gun stabiliser, can fire the 3BM69 Vacuum-2 and 3BM70 Vacuum-1 APFSDS, 3VOF128 Telnik Programmable MultiRole round, can also fire radar guided 3UBK21 Sprinter and infrared homing 3UBK25 Sokol-V)

=== China ===
- ZPT-98: Used on Type 96. Thermal sleeve with barrel sensors for FCS.
- ZPT-98A: Used on Type 99. Modern gun with modern sensors and a static MRS for long range APFSDS.

=== Ukraine ===
- KBA-3: Used on T-84. 2A46M-1 analogue.

=== Slovakia ===
- 2A46MS: Modernized version of the 2A46 that was designed for the T-72M2 Moderna to increase it's efficiency and accuracy. The gun maintains the same mechanical interface as the original 2A46 gun. The increase in accuracy was achieved by redesigning the breech block of the gun to make it more symmetrical, decreasing the resistance of the recoil brake while the round is getting fired from the barrel, shifting the axis of the recoil brake below the barrel axis on the sighting plane, and by using two opposing barrel blocks and adjusting their position relative to the barrel axis. All of these improvements resulted in an increase in first hit probability by 23%. While the T-72M2 Moderna never entered serial production, the gun achieved some minor export success with it being adopted on the PT-91M Pendekar.

== Tanks using the 2A46 ==
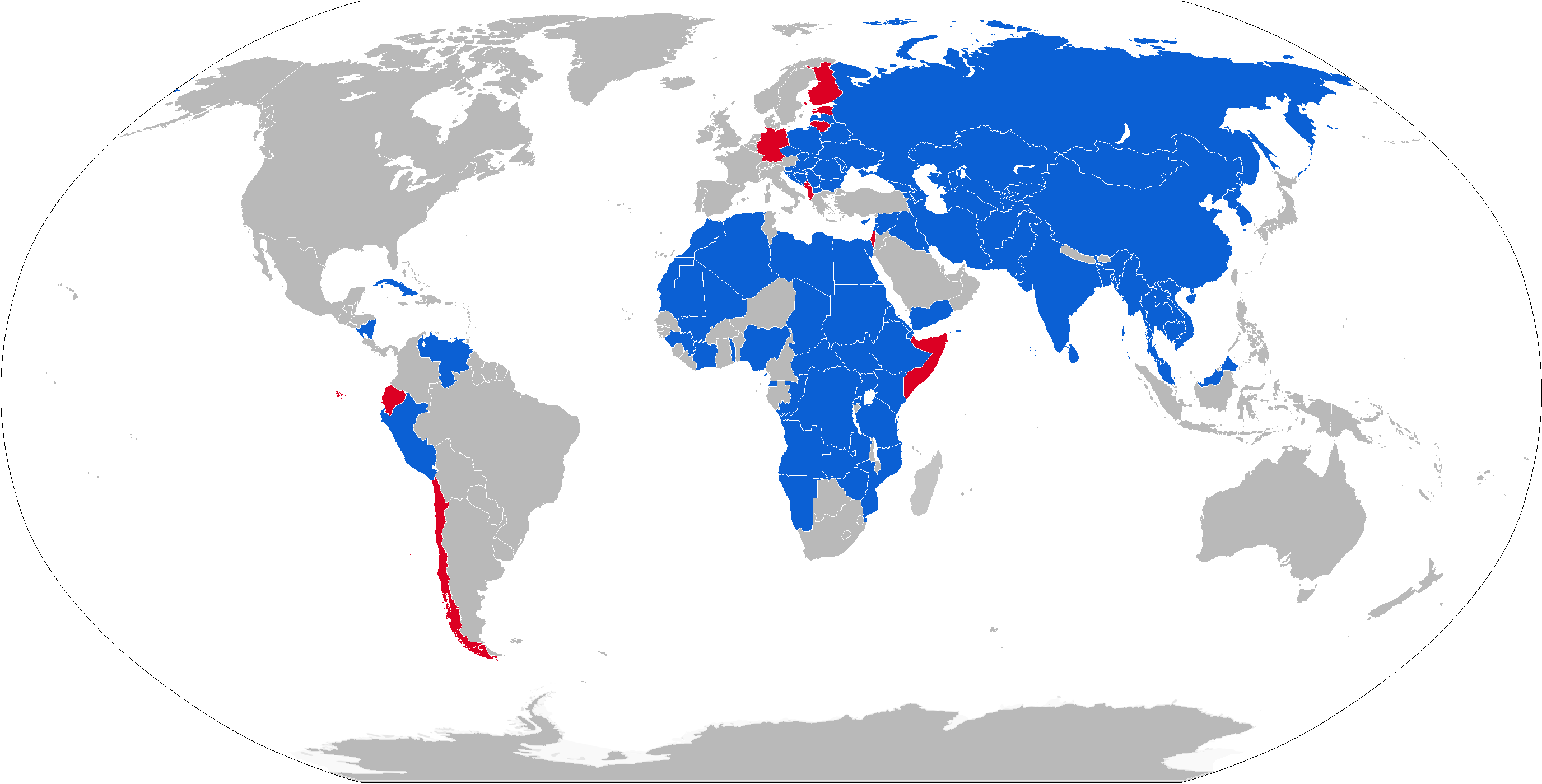
Map with 2A46 operators in blue with former operators in red

The 2A46 has been used in numerous tanks, almost exclusively Soviet/Russian designs or foreign derivatives:

- Armenia
  - T-72A
  - T-72B
  - T-90S
- Azerbaijan
  - T-72A
  - T-72B
  - T-72AV
  - T-72 "Aslan"
  - T-90S
- Bangladesh
  - Type 59G(BD) Durjoy
- China
  - Type 96B
  - Type 99
- Croatia
  - M-95 Degman
  - M-84D
- Cyprus
  - T-80U
  - T-80UK
- Czech Republic
  - T-72M4CZ
  - T-72M1
- Georgia
  - T-72SIM1
- Iran
  - Zulfiqar
  - Karrar
- Iraq
  - Asad Babil tank
- South Korea
  - T-80U
  - T-80UK
- North Korea
  - Chonma-ho V (Ma)
  - Pokpung-Ho II & III
- Malaysia
  - PT-91M Pendekar
- Poland
  - PT-91 Twardy
- Socialist Republic of Romania
  - TR-125
- Russia
  - T-90
  - T-80
  - T-72
  - T-67 (125 mm gun-armed T-62)
  - T-64 (after T-64A variant)
  - T-55M6
  - Obyekt 640/Black Eagle
- Serbia
  - M-84AS
- Syria
  - T-90
  - T-72
- Thailand
  - T-84
  - VT-4
- Ukraine
  - T-84
  - T-64
  - T-80
  - T-72
- Vietnam
  - T-90S
  - T-90SK
- Yugoslavia
  - M-84

== See also ==
- 125 mm smoothbore ammunition
- 2A45 Sprut – Soviet towed 125 mm anti-tank gun
- 2A82-1M – New Russian 125-mm equivalent, developed by Uralvagonzavod in 2014.

=== Weapons of comparable role, performance and era ===
- L11A5 120 mm rifled gun: British rifled equivalent, developed by Royal Armament Research and Development Establishment (RARDE) in 1957.
- Rheinmetall 120 mm gun: German equivalent, developed by Rheinmetall in 1974.
- CN120-25 120 mm gun: French equivalent, developed by Établissement d'Études et de Fabrication d'Armements de Bourges (EFAB) in 1979.
- EXP-28M1 120 mm rifled tank gun: Experimental British weapon of the late 1970s/early 1980s. Was to have equipped the MBT-80.
- CN120-26 120 mm gun: French equivalent, developed by EFAB in 1980s.
- IMI 120 mm gun: Israeli equivalent, developed by Israeli Military Industries in 1988.
- OTO Breda 120 mm gun: Italian equivalent, developed by OTO Melara in 1988.
- L30A1 120 mm rifled gun: British rifled equivalent, developed by ROF Nottingham in 1989.
- JSW 120 mm gun: Japanese equivalent, developed by Japan Steel Works in 2008.
- CN08 120 mm gun: South Korean equivalent, developed by Agency for Defense Development (ADD) and WIA in 2008.
- MKE 120 mm tank gun: Turkish equivalent, developed by Otokar and Hyundai WIA in 2016.

== Sources ==
- "Vasiliy Fofanov's Modern Russian Armour Page". Vasiliy Fofanov's Modern Russian Armour Page.
