= Zulfiqar (tank) =

Iranian battle tank

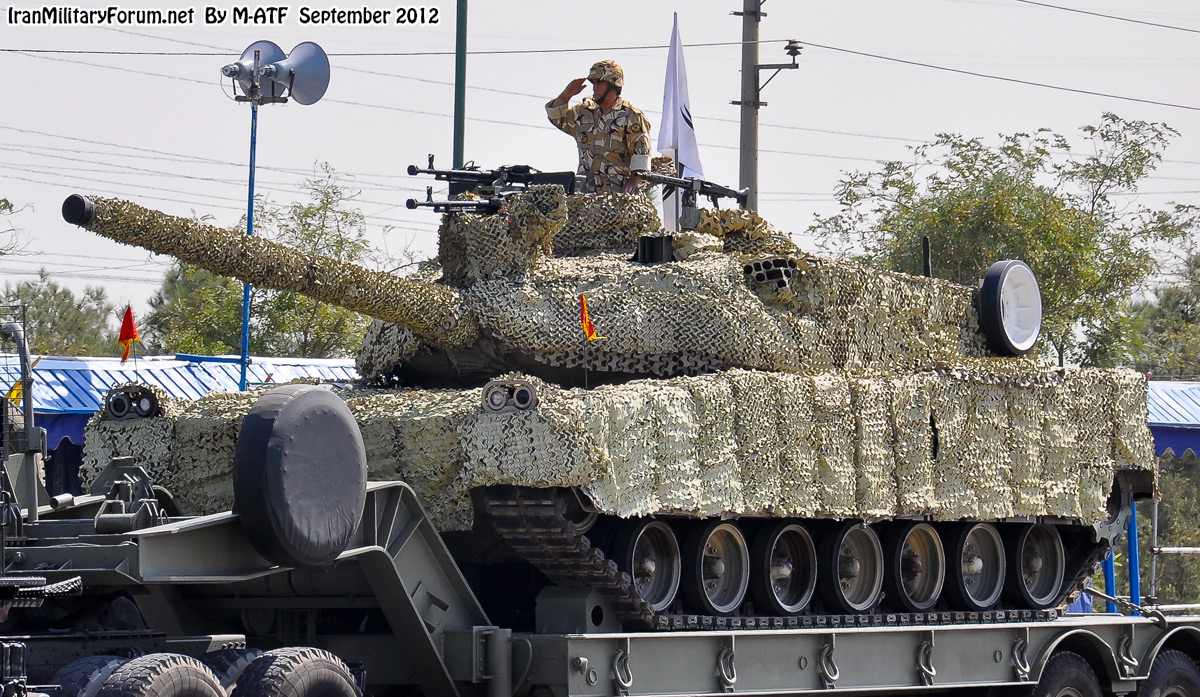
- Zulfiqar 3.
- Type: Main battle tank
- Place of origin: Iran

Service history
- Used by: Islamic Republic of Iran

Production history
- Designer: Research and Self-Sufficiency Jihad Organization of Islamic Republic of Iran Ground Force
- Designed: 1993 – Zulfiqar-1 2012 – Zulfiqar-3
- Manufacturer: Shahid Kolah Dooz Industrial Complex
- Produced: 1996–present
- No. built: ~400 Zulfiqar-1 in 2022 750 Zulfiqar-3
- Variants: Zulfiqar 1, Zulfiqar 2, Zulfiqar 3

Specifications (Zulfiqar 3)
- Mass: 52 tonnes
- Length: 9.20 m (30 ft 2 in)
- Width: 3.6 m (11 ft 10 in)
- Height: 2.5 m (8 ft 2 in)
- Crew: 3
- Armor: composite armour
- Main armament: 2A46 125 mm gun
- Secondary armament: 12.7 mm and 7.62 mm machine guns
- Engine: 12-cyl. diesel Zulfiqar 1: 780 hp (630 kW) Zulfiqar 3: AVDS-1790 1000 hp
- Power/weight: 21.7 hp/ton (Zulfiqar 1),17.85 hp/ton (zulfiqar 3)
- Transmission: 6-gear SPAT 1200 automatic transmission
- Suspension: torsion-bar
- Operational range: 450 km (280 mi)
- Maximum speed: 70 km/h (43 mph)

Zulfiqar (Persian: ذوالفقار) is an Iranian main battle tank, conceived by Brigadier General Mir-Younes Masoumzadeh, deputy ground force commander for research and self-sufficiency of the armed forces. It is named after Zulfiqar, the legendary sword of Ali, the first imam. It's also known as Zolfaqar.

The test prototypes of the tank were evaluated in 1993. Six semi-industrial prototypes of the tank were produced and tested in 1997.

== Design specifications ==
=== Features ===
The tank has a distinctive box-shaped, steel-welded turret of local design. The Zulfiqar is believed to be developed from major components of the Soviet T-72 and American M48 and M60 tanks. The suspension is modelled on the M48 /M60 Patton tanks supplied to Iran by the U.S. The SPAT 1200 transmission also seems to be a local development of that of the M60. Zulfiqar-1's combat weight has been reported to be 36 tonnes with a 780 hp diesel engine; giving the tank a 21.7 hp per ton ratio. Some sources see resemblances between the Zulfiqar design and the Brazilian prototype Osório.

The Zulfiqar is operated by a crew of three personnel. The automatic loader is believed to be the same one from the T-72 tank.

On 25 October 2016, Iran had successfully tested an active protection system on the Zulfiqar, based on pulse-doppler and phased-array radar systems equipped with four arms systems that can cover a full 360-degrees of sight.

=== Armament ===
The tank is armed with the smoothbore gun 2A46 derived from that of the T-72, which is fitted with a fume extractor. Its secondary armament consists of a 7.62 mm coaxial and a 12.7 mm machine gun. For the Zulfiqar/T-72 fleet, the Ammunition Group of the Iranian Defense Industries Organization mass-produces a standard high explosive 23 kilograms (51 lb) propellant charge which fires the 3 kg warhead at a muzzle velocity of 850 metres per second (2,800 ft/s).

The Zulfiqar-1 uses the Slovenian EFCS-3 fire control system, the same model used on the Type 72Z ("Safir-74"), providing 'fire-on-the-move' technology. The Zulfiqar allegedly mounts a laser-warning pod on the turret. Its design enables the tank to use an Iranian-made package of reactive armor.

== Production ==
In April 1997 Acting Commander of the Ground Forces of the Iranian Army, Lieutenant General Mohammad Reza Ashtiani announced that the mass production of Zulfiqar tanks, which began in 1996, was still in progress. He stated that the manufacture of 520 different kinds of tank parts, 600 artillery parts, repair of 500 tanks and armored vehicles have been carried out. In late July 1997 Iranian President Hashemi Rafsanjani formally inaugurated a production line for the domestically manufactured Zulfiqar main battle tanks and Boragh tracked armoured personnel carrier. The facility, the Shahid Kolah Dooz Industrial Complex, will also produce the Russian designed BMP-2 armored personnel carrier.

== Variants ==
=== Zulfiqar-1 ===
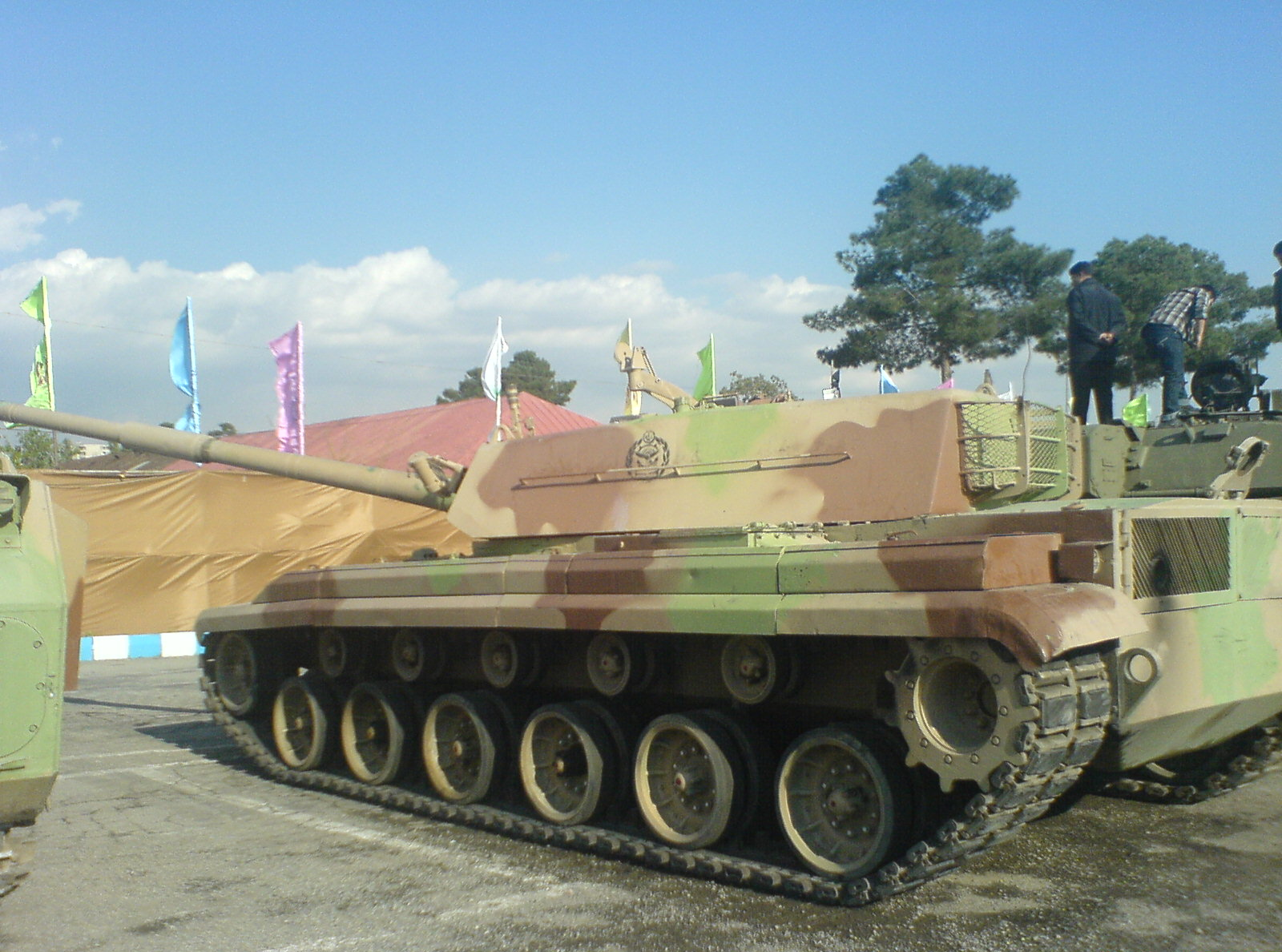
A side view of the Zulfiqar-1

The Zulfiqar-1 is based on the M48 Patton model acquired during the pre-revolution era. The Zulfiqar-1 was first revealed in public in 1994. A total of six prototypes were completed and field tested in 1997. The Zulfiqar-1 is protected by a welded steel hull and the turret is reinforced by a composite armour. The Zulfiqar-1 is armed with a 125mm Smoothbore gun taken from a T-72. At least 150 were produced.

=== Zulfiqar-2 ===
The Zulfiqar-2 is an interim main battle tank prototype used as a test bed. This variant is fitted with a new and more powerful engine. It has an extended chassis and possibly uses an improved autoloader.

=== Zulfiqar-3 ===
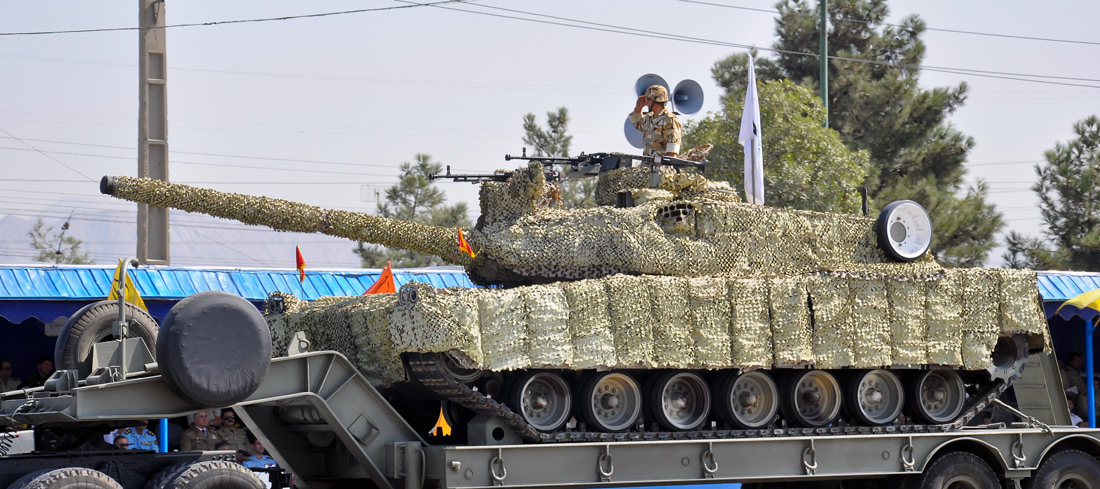
Zulfiqar-3 MBT with camouflage netting and ERA bricks

The Zulfiqar-3, the most advanced variant of the Zulfiqar family, bears a close resemblance to the American M1 Abrams. It features considerable upgrades to the fire-control system, chassis, engine and main gun. The new variant is equipped with the 2A46 125 mm smoothbore cannon with an autoloader, a laser rangefinder and a new fire-control system. It is also fitted with a reinforced turret and the wheels are covered by an armoured skirt. Research and development on the tank was completed in 1999 and the Zulfiqar-3 appeared in a military parade in 2011. Around 100 built, unknown current production status. Some estimates put it as high as 250.

== Operators ==
- Iran - At least 150 Zulfiqar-1, and 100 Zulfiqar-3.
