= Sosna-U =

Belarusian/Russian tank gunner's sight

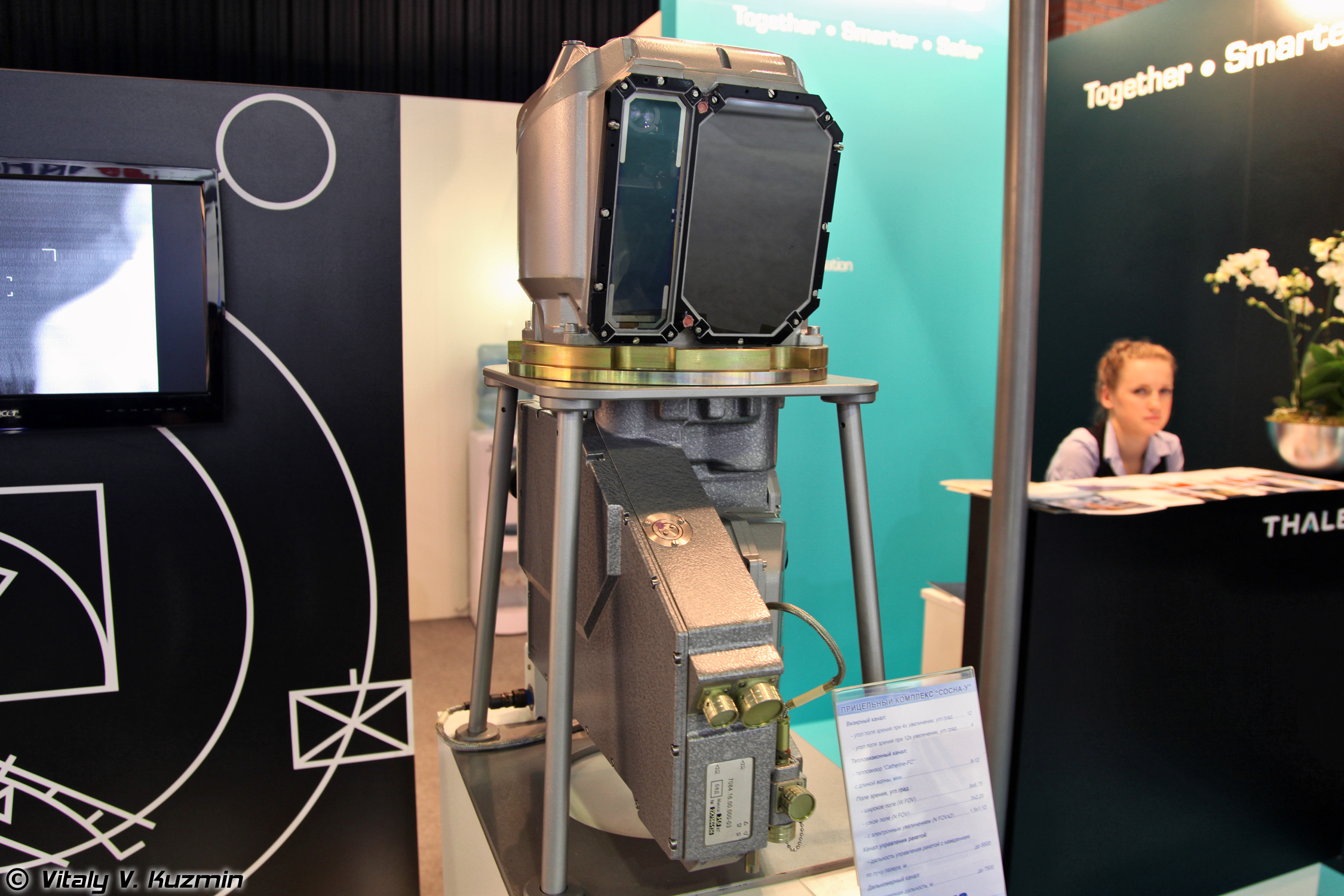
Sosna-U sight

The Sosna-U (Russian: Сосна-У, "Pine-U") is a Belarusian/Russian tank gunner's sight used on tanks such as the T-72B3, T-80BVM and T-90MS. It was developed in Belarus by JSC Peleng and later produced in Russia by JSC VOMZ. It features a daylight sight, a thermal sight and a laser rangefinder. The sight contains a built in ballistic computer which takes into account ambient temperature, temperature of the ammunition and current air pressure to calculate the trajectory of the ammunition type selected.

A major component of the Sosna-U is the Catherine-FC thermal imager which is made by the French company Thales. As Russia seeks to decrease their dependence on foreign companies, a completely indigenous alternative to the Sosna-U has been made, the PNM-T.

== Components ==
The Sosna-U sight complex features multiple subcomponents:

- Main sight unit
- Stabilization unit
- Control panel
- Ballistic computer with sensor array (temperature, air pressure)
- Thermal control panel
- VSU-12 - Thermal display
- Miscellaneous spare parts and cables

== Applications ==
- T-72B2
- Algerian T-72M1M
- T-72B3
- T-80BVM
- T-90MS
- 2S25M

== See also ==
- PNK-6
