= T-72M2 Moderna =

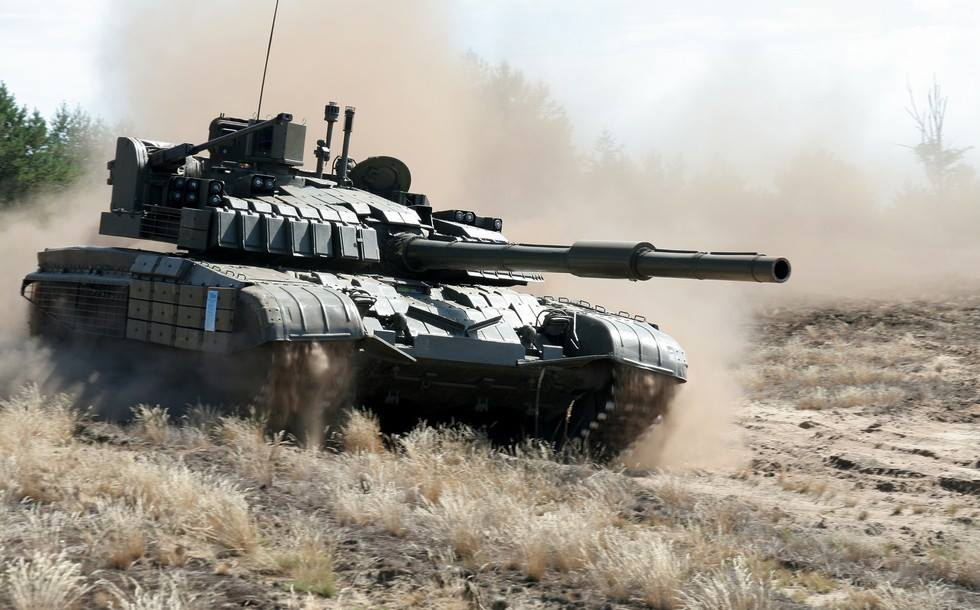
- The T-72M2 Moderna at a Tank Display
- Type: Main battle tank
- Place of origin: Slovakia

Production history
- Developed from: T-72M1
- Produced: 2000
- No. built: 1
- Variants: T-72M2E, T-72M2 Moderna

Specifications
- Crew: 3
- Rate of fire: Maximum of 8 rounds per minute
- Main armament: 125 mm 2A46MS smoothbore cannon
- Secondary armament: 2× Oerlikon KAA or 1× Shipunov 2A42

T-72M2 Moderna is a Slovak modernization of the T-72 main battle tank. The aims of the modernization were to improve the combat effectiveness of the T-72M1 that was already in service with the Slovak Ground Forces. The development led to the production of one prototype that was presented at multiple defense exhibitions. However, the project never entered serial production and only one prototype was ever built since the Ministry of Defence moved away from modernizing the T-72.

== History ==
Almost all Soviet-origin tanks for the Czechoslovak People's Army were produced domestically at ZŤS Martin (Závody ťažkého strojárstva Martin, Heavy Machinery Works Martin). These included the T-34-85, T-54/T-55, and in the 1980s production of T-72s began. Following the dissolution of Czechoslovakia, the Slovak Armed Forces inherited a large number of these T-72s, across many different variants, but namely the T-72M and T-72M1.

== Development ==
=== T-72M2E ===
The T-72M2E with the two 20 mm Oerlikon KAA cannons.

In 1994, the 2nd T-72 modernization from ZŤS Martin was unveiled at IDET 1994, dubbed the T-72M2E "Moderna". It's armament retained the original 2A46 125 mm gun and the coaxial machine gun from the original T-72M/M1, but two 20 mm Oerlikon KAA were added to the sides of the turret. According to local experts, the tracks from an older modernization prototype were reused, and they argued that it was a mistake to use two weaker foreign cannons (Oerlikon KAA), when a more powerful 30 mm Shipunov 2A42 autocannon was already available.

=== T-72M2 Moderna ===
Following the IDET exhibition, ZŤS Martin continued developing the vehicle into the second version of the prototype, which would later carry the name, T-72M2 Moderna. After conducting multiple military tests, the two Oerlikon KAA cannons were removed due to their strain on the turret ring while firing simultaneously. Slovak defence companies equipped the new version with a modernized 125 mm 2A46MS smoothbore cannon. Anti-aircraft protection was kept but this time in the form of a 30 mm Shipunov 2A42 autocannon. The coaxial machine gun was also replaced with a TK vz. 95, a 7.62 mm Czechoslovak coaxial machine gun which can fire either 7.62×54mmR or 7.62×51mm NATO ammunition just by replacing the breech and a few other minor components.

Aside from the armament, other parts of the tank were also improved, the DYNAS ERA which was slightly modified, the laser warning receiver designed to protect from laser rangefinders and laser illuminators used the Lird-3A and later Lird-4 sensor, which was connected to the 22 Galix 81 mm smoke grenade dispensers. The crew compartment was protected from fire by a Deugra system, and from harmful particles thanks to a GO-27 modernized air filter and toxic substances detector. Radio connection is ensured by a RACAL Panther 2000-V radio with a range of 25 kilometers.

The vehicle also featured a new engine in the form of the S-12U engine with a power output of 625 kW, which was a modernized version of the V46-6 engine which was used on most early T-72 variants.

In 1998, the Slovak Minister of Defence Ján Sitek announced that "In the beginning of June, we signed a contract with ZŤS Martin for the future contract for the production and delivery of 5 T-72 Moderna tanks." According to most sources, this contract was never fulfilled and only one vehicle has ever been produced, the sole prototype.

== Description ==
=== Armament ===
The 30 mm Shipunov 2A42 autocannon.

The T-72M2 Moderna is a main battle tank with a 3-person crew, (driver, gunner, commander). It is armed with a 125 mm 2A46MS smoothbore cannon and a 30 mm Shipunov 2A42 autocannon. The main gun has a smooth gun breach, with a 2-axis stabilizer. The main gun is complemented by a 7.62 mm coaxial machine gun. The unique part of the tank is the 30 mm Shipunov 2A42 mounted on the roof to protect from low-flying aircraft. Originally however, it was armed with two Oerlikon 20 mm cannons on the left and right sides of the turret (see the T-72M2E section for more).

Other new equipment that the tank features is a new SFIM MVS 580 panoramic sight for the commander, a TIGS thermal sight for the gunner, and a PNK-72 night-vision device for the driver. Apart from the traditional steel armor, the tank is also equipped with a DYNAS modernized explosive reactive armor package along the turret as well as the front and sides of the hull. Protection is further increased by a LIRD-1 laser warning receiver.

=== Crew protection ===
As many other T-72 variants, the vehicle also came equipped with protection against weapons of mass destruction. New fire extinguishing equipment and other fire protection equipment was also installed in the crew compartment as well as in the engine compartment. Protection of the driver was also improved by attaching the seat to the roof of the hull, unlike previously where the seat was mounted directly to the floor of the hull, which together with changes in the geometry of the bottom of the hull significantly improved the tank's mine-resistance.
