= PNK-6 =

The PNK-6 (Ukrainian: ПНК-6) is a Ukrainian commander's panoramic tank optic used on the T-84 Oplot-M tank. It was developed by the Sokol Central Design Bureau (TsKB Sokol) and later by its successor NPK Fotopribor (now part of UkrOboronProm) which produced the optic. It combines features such as a day sight, a thermal sight and a laser rangefinder. It also features duplicate controls of the gunner's station, allowing the tank commander to operate the weaponry.

While the T-84 Oplot-M has been the only application thus far, the optic has also been offered to be used on Ukrainian T-64B, T-72 and T-80 tanks.

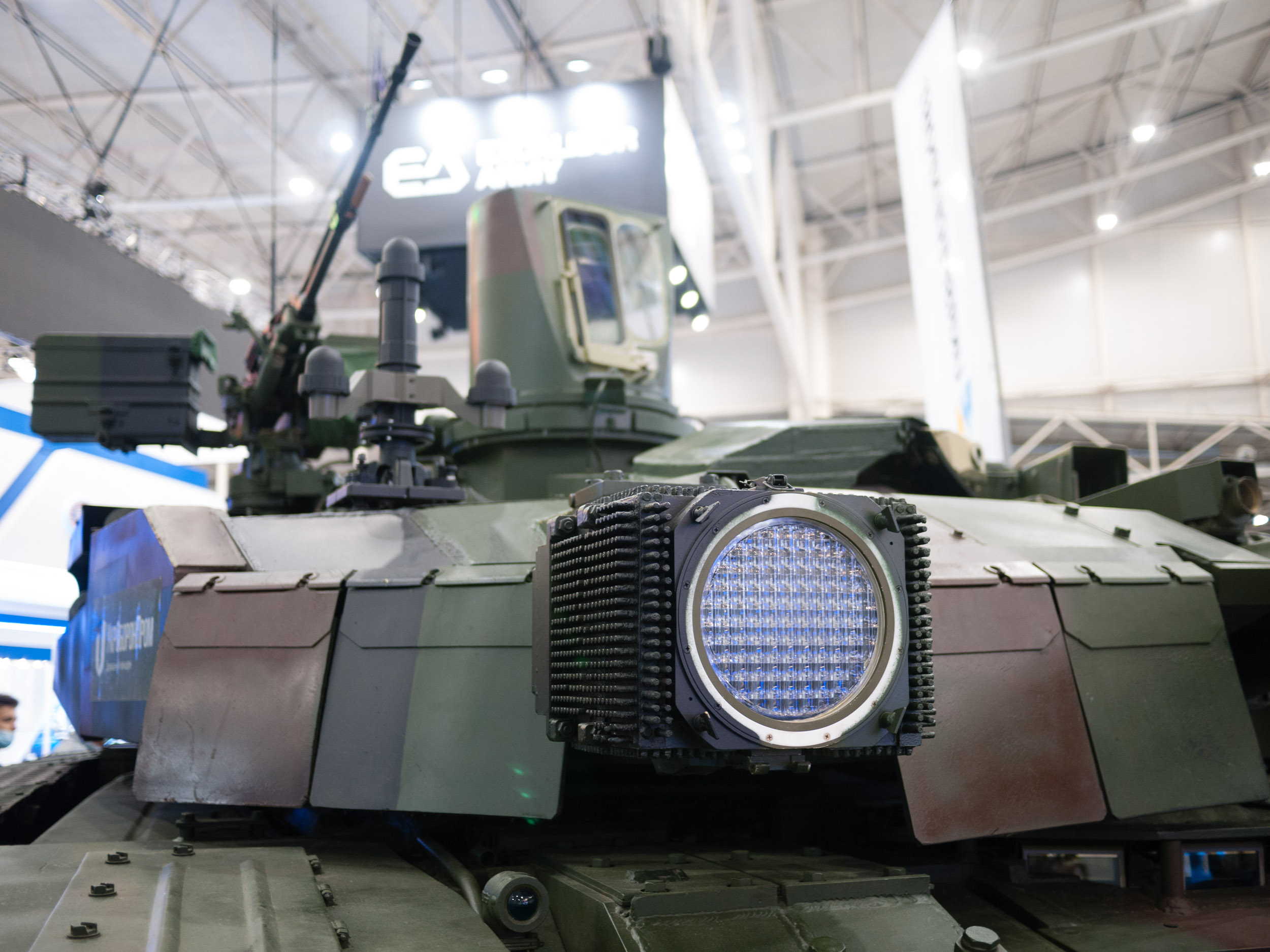
Turret of the T-84 Oplot-M. The large PNK-6 can be seen on top.

== Features and specifications ==
The system has a two-axis stabilizer with a 0.05 milliradian error margin. It can traverse all around with a minimum elevation of -20° and a maximum of 60°. The daylight optic has three magnification levels to choose between: 1.2×, 6× and 12×. The maximum effective range where a tank target can be identified is 5500 metres.

=== Thermals ===
The thermal camera is based on the Catherine-FC from the French company Thales, similar to the Russian Sosna-U gunner's sight. The identification range on the thermal camera is 500 metres less than the day channel, giving a maximum of 5000 metres for detection.

=== Laser rangefinder ===
The laser rangefinder of the system has a minimum range of 200 metres and a maximum range of 9500 metres.

== Components ==
The PNK-6 sight complex features multiple subcomponents.

- TKN-6 - The optical instruments which are on the tank exterior
- EB-6 - Electrical unit
- BUG-6 - Main control unit
- BK-6 - Switching unit
- Four-bar linkage drive unit
- Gun position sensor
- Weaponry traverse control unit
- Thermal optics control panel

== See also ==
- Sosna-U
