= M-95 Degman =

Prototype Croatian main battle tank

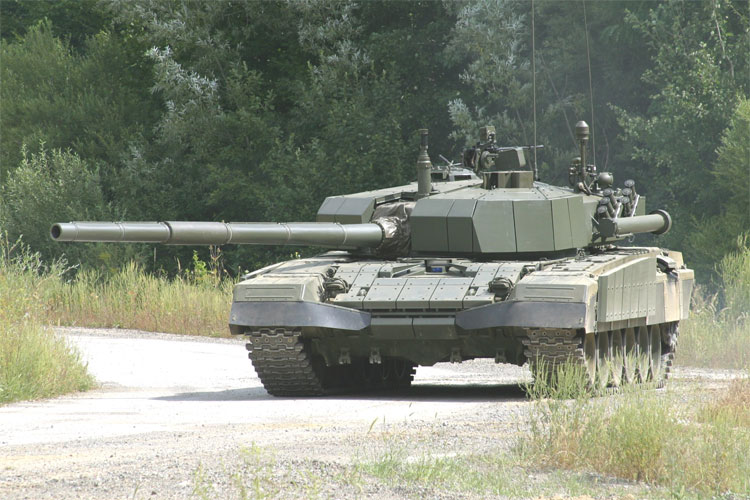
- M-95 MBT Degman
- Type: Main battle tank
- Place of origin: Yugoslavia / Croatia

Production history
- Manufacturer: Đuro Đaković specijalna vozila d.d.
- No. built: Finished: 2 prototypes Unfinished: 150 M91 Vihor (120 hulls, 3 engines, 27 turrets with no cannon)

Specifications
- Mass: 44.5 tonnes without reactive armour, 48.5 tonnes
- Length: 10.1 m (33 ft 2 in)
- Width: 3.6 m (11 ft 10 in)
- Height: 2.2 m (7 ft 3 in)
- Crew: 3 (commander, driver and gunner)
- Armor: Composite armour plus Elbit Systems RRAK Reactive armour
- Main armament: 125 mm 2A46M5 smoothbore gun (42 shells, 22 in automatic loader)
- Secondary armament: Samson Remote Controlled Weapon Station or Kongsberg Protector (RWS)
- Engine: 12-cyl. diesel 1,200 hp (890 kW)
- Power/weight: 27 hp/tonne
- Transmission: two gear-boxes with side transmission in gear-box axes
- Suspension: independent, with torsion bars, 6 hydraulic dampers, 6 road wheels and 3 return rollers per side
- Ground clearance: 428 mm (16.9 in)
- Operational range: 700 km (430 mi), 780 km (480 mi) with extra fuel tanks
- Maximum speed: 72 km/h (45 mph)
- Steering system: hydraulic

The M-95 Degman is a prototype Croatian main battle tank, developed in 2003 by the Đuro Đaković company and is largely based on the older M-91 Vihor tank that was based in the M-84 tank. The Đuro Đaković factory is best known for its principal role in the production of the M-84 in the Yugoslav era.

The principal improvement over its predecessor M-84 is the application of spaced composite/laminate armor on top of which explosive reactive armor was added, hull front and side skirts are covered giving extra protection against HEAT shaped-charge munitions. A separate ammunition bustle compartment at the back of the turret adds protection for the crew if tank is hit from behind, and added protection is given by additional slat armor in form of wire mesh with chains, main purpose being to prevent any rocket propelled grenades that might be used to penetrate weakest points at the back of the tank.

Đuro Đaković thermal imaging allows enhanced night activity and optional 1,200 hp (890 kW) engine, which increases the power-to-weight ratio to approximately 27 hp/t. There are numerous smaller changes in fire control, communications equipment, track etc. The Degman's autoloader is 15% faster meaning 9 shells can be fired in a single minute instead of 8 shells, which is M84 norm.

The Degman M-95 has not entered serial production. Two prototypes were ordered by the Croatian Government, a M-95 model and the other M-84D sample (for export).

== History, production and modernization ==
The M-95 Degman tank was largely based on the older M-91 Vihor tank. A full working prototype of the Vihor tank completed basic testing at the Đuro Đaković factory but due to the hostilities in mid-1991 this tank was never delivered to JNA. Đuro Đaković was already working on a second prototype (at this point the hull had been completed) but due to the hostilities work on the second Vihor prototype stalled until 1994 when it was completed with the new turret.

Meanwhile, the first prototype was upgraded and modernized, a more powerful 1200 hp engine was installed which provided a higher power-to-weight ratio. A storage basket and slat armor at the back of the turret were added, increasing armour protection. A Racal communication suite was installed to improve communications range and digital battlefield compatibility and a new CBRN suite was also added, the SZ 2000 CBRN suite giving substantially superior performance over the older NBC suite used on M-84 tank; for example, in nuclear or chemical/biological warfare situations, SZ-2000 shuts the engines down and automatically filters fresh air into the tank.

The optics and fire control system was developed by Fotona, a Slovenian company, and now comes as standard on all current Croatian and Slovene M-84 tanks. The Vihor/M95 tank received new laser range finder, LIRD-4B - a laser irradiation warning system. A Fotona/Končar/Đuro Đaković digital battlefield computer has also been added to improve battlefield performance. Diehl provided new tracks giving the tank better performance both on and off-road.

This project received considerable assistance from Elbit of Israel. Explosive Reactive Armor developed by Elbit is one major upgrade and gives a distinctive look to the M95 tank. Rafael - Samson Remote Controlled Weapon Station which consist of a 12.7mm calibre heavy machine gun and 40 mm grenade launcher is another upgrade. This Remote Controlled Weapon Station acts also as the commander's independent thermal viewer. Additional upgrades are planned, including a new 120mm compact gun developed by RUAG Defence of Switzerland and few additional defensive and ECM systems including LAHAT anti tank missiles.

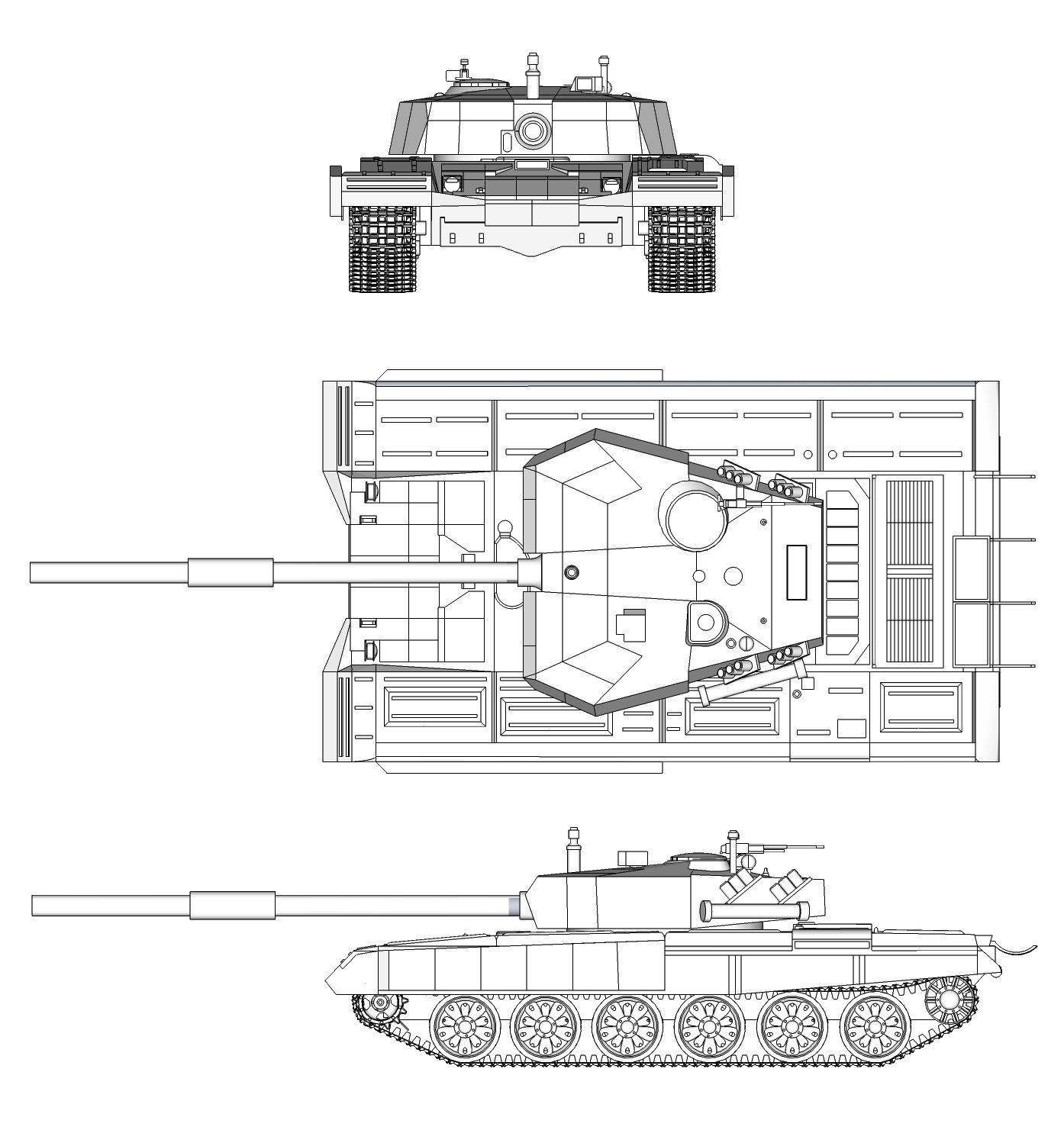

== Deployment ==
Tanks are stored and not operational. There's no intention to reactivate this program.

== See also ==
- List of equipment of the Croatian Army
- List of main battle tanks by generation
