= TR-125 =

- TR-125
- Type: Main battle tank
- Place of origin: Romania

Service history
- Used by: Romania
- Wars: None

Production history
- No. built: 5–10 prototypes

Specifications
- Mass: 50 tonnes
- Length: 7.9 m
- Width: 3.6 m
- Height: 2.2 m
- Crew: 3 (commander, driver and gunner)
- Armor: Composite armour 570 mm (22.4 in) front of the turret
- Main armament: 125 mm A555 smoothbore tank gun
- Secondary armament: PKMT 7.62 mm coaxial machine gun, DShK 12.7 mm AA machine gun on commander's ring-mount
- Engine: 8VSA3 diesel 900 hp (671 kW)
- Power/weight: 18 hp/tonne (13.4 kW/tonne)
- Suspension: torsion bar

The TR-125 (Romanian: Tanc Românesc 125, lit. 'Romanian Tank 125') prototype main battle tank is a redesigned T-72 made in Romania with Romanian components only. The number 125 in the designation refers to the 125 mm A555 smoothbore tank gun. It is now designated P-125 (P stands for Prototype).

== History ==
By 1977 Romania secured a deal to purchase 31 T-72 Ural-1s from the USSR. They were delivered in 1978-1979 to the 1st Tank Regiment and the contract value was 150 million lei valută Est. The Romanian government asked USSR for a license to build T-72 tanks locally. Rebuffed by the Soviet leaders, the communist government decided to reverse-engineer the T-72 tank.

The tank was developed from 1984 to 1991. The turret and the loading mechanism were developed by ICSITEM research institute from Bucharest, while the chassis was designed by ACSIT–P 124 from the F.M.G.S. (FMGS stands for "Fabrica de Mașini Grele Speciale" - Special Heavy Equipment Factory) division of the "23rd August" (now known as FAUR) factory from Bucharest.

Between five and ten prototypes were made between 1987 and 1988 and tested until 1991. An order from the Romanian Army did not come however, and the project was later cancelled. The prototypes are kept in storage.

== Description ==
The vehicle has a modified suspension with seven pairs of wheels, unlike the T-72 and most tanks based on it which have six. This allowed the hull to be stretched by 1 m and installation of a more powerful 850-900 HP diesel engine 8VSA3, basically a variant of the engine mounted in TR-85. It used an old DShK machine gun for anti-aircraft purposes and was fitted with extra armour. The 125mm A555 smoothbore tank gun was developed by Arsenal Reșița factory. As a result of these changes the tank's weight increased from 41.5 tonnes (T-72M) to around 50 tonnes.

== Operators ==
- Romania - The exact number varies by source: 3, 5 or 10 prototypes.

== References and notes ==
References
