= T-Rex (tank) =

Planned Ukrainian main battle tank

- Type: Project MBT
- Place of origin: Ukraine

Production history
- Designer: Arey Engineering Group

Specifications
- Mass: 39 ton
- Length: 6.57 m 9.23 m gun forward
- Width: 3.56 m
- Height: 2.50 m
- Crew: 3
- Main armament: 125mm gun
- Engine: Diesel

The T-Rex (Ukrainian: Тірекс) was a Ukrainian main battle tank announced in 2016. However, after the design was patented in 2017, the project never advanced from the initial prototype stage.

== Development ==
The T-Rex, named after Tyrannosaurus rex, was announced in 2016 and was developed by the Arey Engineering Group, which falls under the Azov Battalion. Its main competitor was the Russian MBT T-14 Armata. Sergei Stepanov, the chief designer for Arey, claimed that the tank would have a "conceptually new system of fire control and a high level of personnel protection", along with features including "high maneuverability, 360-degree vision, and a high-bandwidth counteraction analytics system".

The vehicle would be based on the T-64, and hulls of the T-64 and T-72, inherited by the thousands from the Soviet Union, would be reused in its production. The Azov Battalion estimated that up to 20 tanks could be upgraded every month.

== Design ==
The T-Rex would feature an unmannedturret. The three crew members would be seated in an armored capsule at the front of the hull, where they could remotely control the cannon, the automatic loader, and the machine guns. The tank would weigh 39 tons and be equipped with a 125 millimetres (4.9 in) main gun with "high-power projectiles". The armor would utilize both Nizh and Duplet (Ukrainian: Дуплет) explosive reactive armor. The combat capability was said by the Ukrainian press to exceed those of the Oplot and the Bulat, while at the same time being more cost-effective than the Bulat.
