= Stalker (combat vehicle) =

Ukrainian armored vehicle

Stalker is an experimental Ukrainian tank support combat vehicle based on the chassis of the T-64 tank.

== History ==
BMPT Stalker was developed jointly by the Zhytomyr and Kyiv armored plants together with Artem Design Bureau. The vehicle was first showcased at the Weapon and Security-2017 exhibition. In addition to tank support on the battlefield, Stalker was intended to provide the destruction of both air and ground targets.

== Armament ==
Equipped with the combat module "Duplet." The firepower of Stalker is provided by two automatic 30 mm ZTM-2 autocannons, two paired 7.62 mm machine guns KM-7.62, 30 mm automatic grenade launcher AG-17, and the high-precision anti-tank missile system "Barrier" with four launchers. The module also has six 81 mm aerosol installations for firing smoke grenades "Tucha".
