= 5TD engine =

Diesel engine from Ukraine

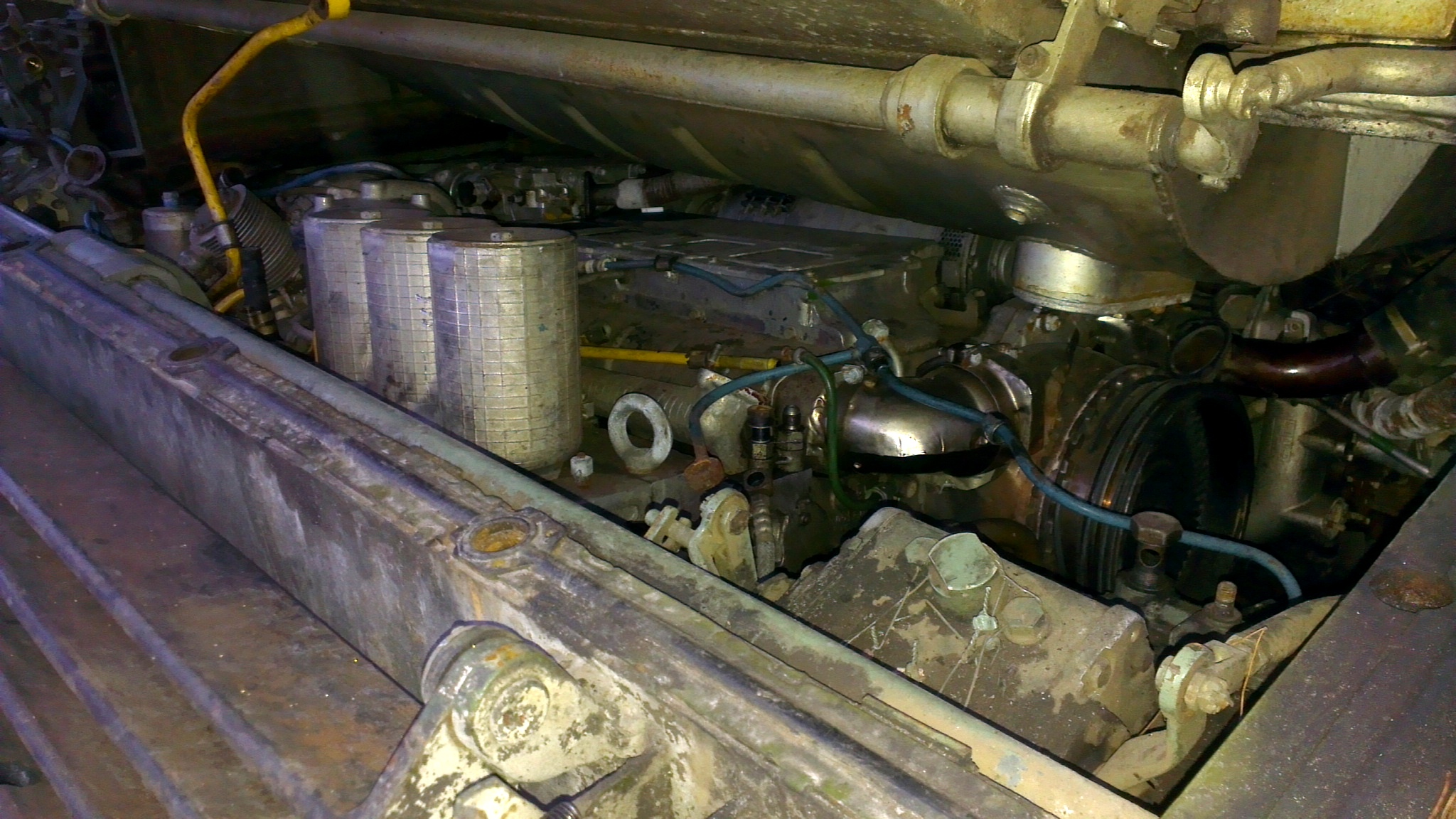
- The engine in a T-64 tank

Overview
- Manufacturer: Malyshev Factory
- Designer: Malyshev Factory

Layout
- Configuration: 5-cylinder
- Cylinder bore: 120 mm (4.7 in)
- Piston stroke: 2 × 120 mm (4.7 in)

Combustion
- Fuel type: Diesel
- Cooling system: Liquid

Output
- Power output: 515–772 kW (700–1,050 PS)

Dimensions
- Length: 1,413 mm (55.6 in)
- Width: 955 mm (37.6 in)
- Height: 581 mm (22.9 in)
- Dry weight: 1,040 kg (2,290 lb)

Chronology
- Predecessor: 4TD

The 5TD engine (Ukrainian: 5ТД) is a series of two-stroke 5-cylinder diesel engines, which was designed and manufactured in the Malyshev Factory in Kharkiv. As a multi-fuel engine, the 5TD is designed for installation on various modifications of T-64 tanks, with high supercharging, liquid cooling, direct fuel injection, oppositely moving pistons, horizontal arrangement of cylinders (cylinder diameter 120 mm, piston stroke 2×120 mm), 5-cylinder, and a power of 700—1050 horsepower depending on the modification.

== History ==
The need for a new engine arose during the development of the T-64 tank in the early 1950s. The chief designer of the new tank demanded a compact, relatively small engine compartment, and could not use the existing Kharkiv model V-2. Among the options considered was a prototype engine developed by O. D. Charomsky, which was based on the engine from a Junkers Ju 86 captured during the Spanish Civil War. However, Charomsky did not have access to the actual engine at the time, but only a test stand with a single-cylinder two-stroke diesel engine.

In 1953, Charomsky went on a business trip to Kharkiv, where the 4TD engine was created under his leadership. But since the capacity of this engine was not enough, an additional cylinder was needed, leading to the creation of the 5TD engine with five cylinders and a total capacity of 600 hp (450 kW). Over time the engine was improved, increasing the engine life from 100 to 500 hours.

The 5TD-FMA engine, a variant of the 5TD engine, has a capacity of 1,050 hp (780 kW) and was used in the modernized versions of the T-72 tank, including the T-72UA-1. The new engine was installed while maintaining the standard cooling system and without significant modifications to the tank hull. The compact dimensions of the engine allowed the placement of an additional EA-10-2 power plant with a capacity of 10 kW in the engine-transmission compartment, which has a fuel consumption of 3.8 kg/hr.

During the Russo-Ukrainian war, efforts intensified for the modernization of the T-64 tank. In June 2016, the 5TD engine was modernized into the 5TD-F engine. At the state enterprise "Kharkiv Armored Plant", at the experimental station of diesel engines with a computer information collection system, the 5TDF engine was modernized. With this engine, the driving performance and engine life of the combat vehicle increase significantly.

As of September 2018, Ukrainian enterprises had begun overhauling 5TD-F engines, and had created a certain stock of repaired engines. Since all past production was carried out with cooperation from Russia, production began for critical components that were previously not manufactured in Ukraine.

== Characteristics ==
Characteristics	Engines		
Characteristics	5TD-F	5TD-FM	5TD-FMA
Application	T-64	T-64, T-55	T-72UA-1
Efficiency (Horsepower)	700	850	1050
Fuel consumption rate (g/PS·h)	158	160	153
Weight (kg)	1040		
Size (mm)	1413 × 955 × 581		

== Bibliography ==
- Двигатель 5ТДФ. Техническое описание (PDF). Moscow: Воениздат. Министерство обороны СССР. 1977. Archived from the original (PDF) on 2024-12-01.
  - Outlined description of the 5TD motor
    Тарасенко А. А.; Чернышев В. Л.; Чобиток В. В. (2018). "История двигателей типа 5ТД. Главы из книги «Основной боевой танк Т-64. 50 лет в строю»" (PDF). Двигатель. № 2, 116. pp. 32–37. Archived from the original (PDF) on 2018-06-13.
- Чернышев В., Тарасенко А. (2000). "4.3 Двигатель 5ТДФ и его проблемы". История и парадоксы отечественного танкостроения. Archived from the original on 2015-03-16.
- Е. А. Зубов (1995). "Харьковский завод транспортного машиностроения им. Малышева". In ред. к.т.н. Н. И. Троицкий (ed.). Двигатели танков (из истории танкостроения). Послевоенный период (PDF). Moscow: НТЦ «Информтехника». Archived from the original (PDF) on 2024-11-30.

== See also ==
- 3TD engine — used in several military vehicles, including BMPs and Armoured personnel carriers
- 6TD engine — used in certain models of Soviet tanks, including the T-80UD and T-84 models
