= BMPT "Strazh" =

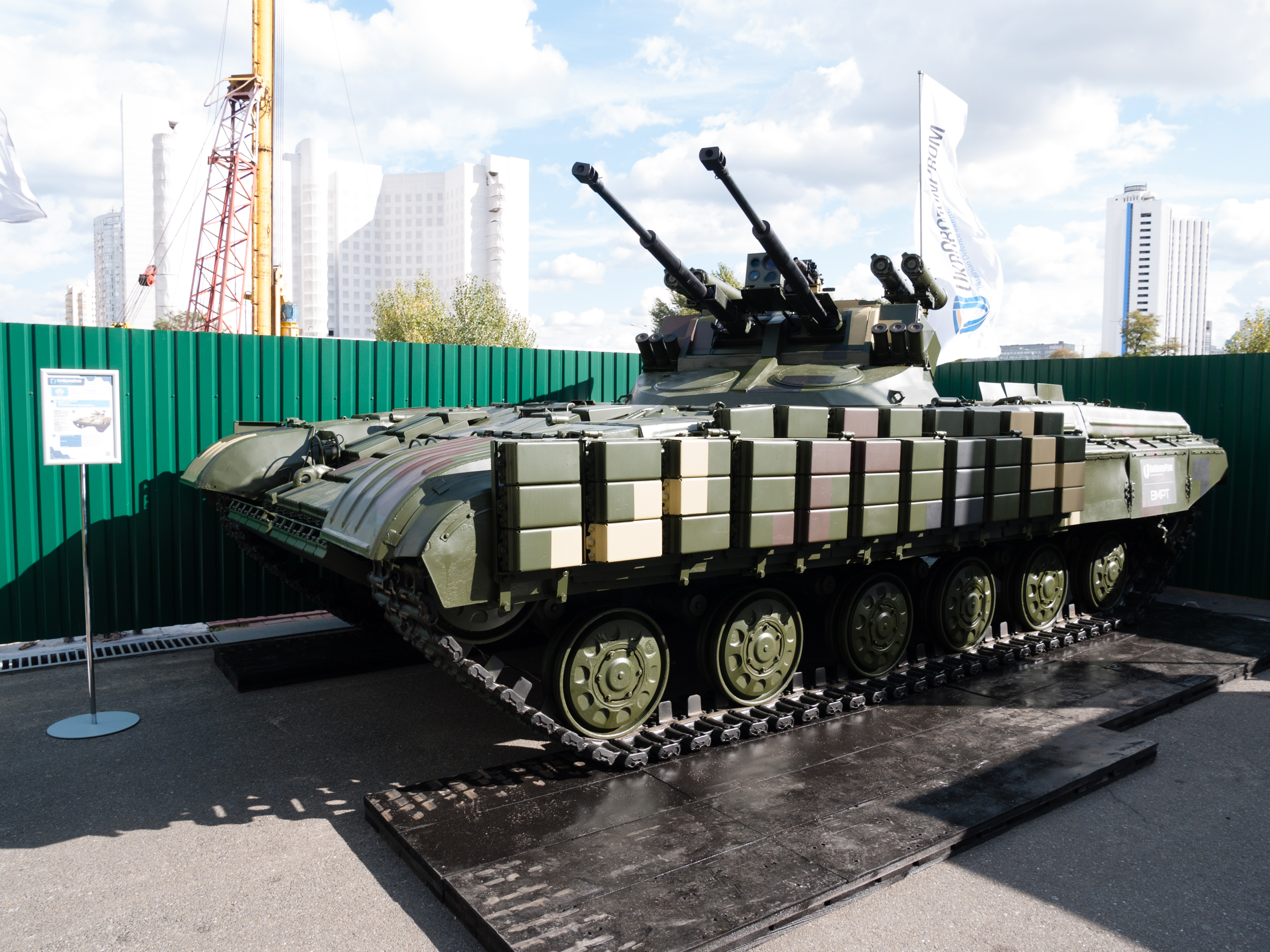
- Type: Tank support combat vehicle
- Place of origin: Ukraine

Production history
- Designed: 2017

Specifications
- Mass: 33 tonnes
- Main armament: "Duplet" combat module: 2 × 30-mm ZTM-2 autocannons; 2 × 7.62-mm coaxial KM-7.62 machine guns; 30-mm automatic grenade launcher AG-17; 4 "Barrier" anti-tank guided missile launchers
- Engine: 700 hp
- Maximum speed: Up to 62 km/h

The BMPT "Strazh" (Ukrainian: БМПТ «Страж») is an experimental Ukrainian armoured fighting vehicle based on the T-64 tank chassis.

== History ==
The BMPT "Strazh" was developed jointly by the Zhytomyr and the Kyiv Armoured Plant together with the Artem State Holding Company, and was first shown at the 2017 Arms and Security exhibition. In addition to supporting tanks on the battlefield, the "Strazh" was intended to destroy both aerial and ground targets.

== Armament ==
The vehicle is equipped with the "Duplet" combat module. The "Strazh's" combat power is provided by two 30-mm Shipunov 2A42 autocannons, two coaxial 7.62-mm KM-7.62 machine guns, a 30-mm automatic grenade launcher AG-17, and the high-precision "Barrier" missile system with four launchers. The module also has six 81-mm aerosol grenade launchers for firing "Tucha" (Cloud) smoke grenades.
