= Nizh (explosive reactive armour) =

Ukrainian explosive reactive armour

Diagram showing principle behind Nizh ERA against APFSDS

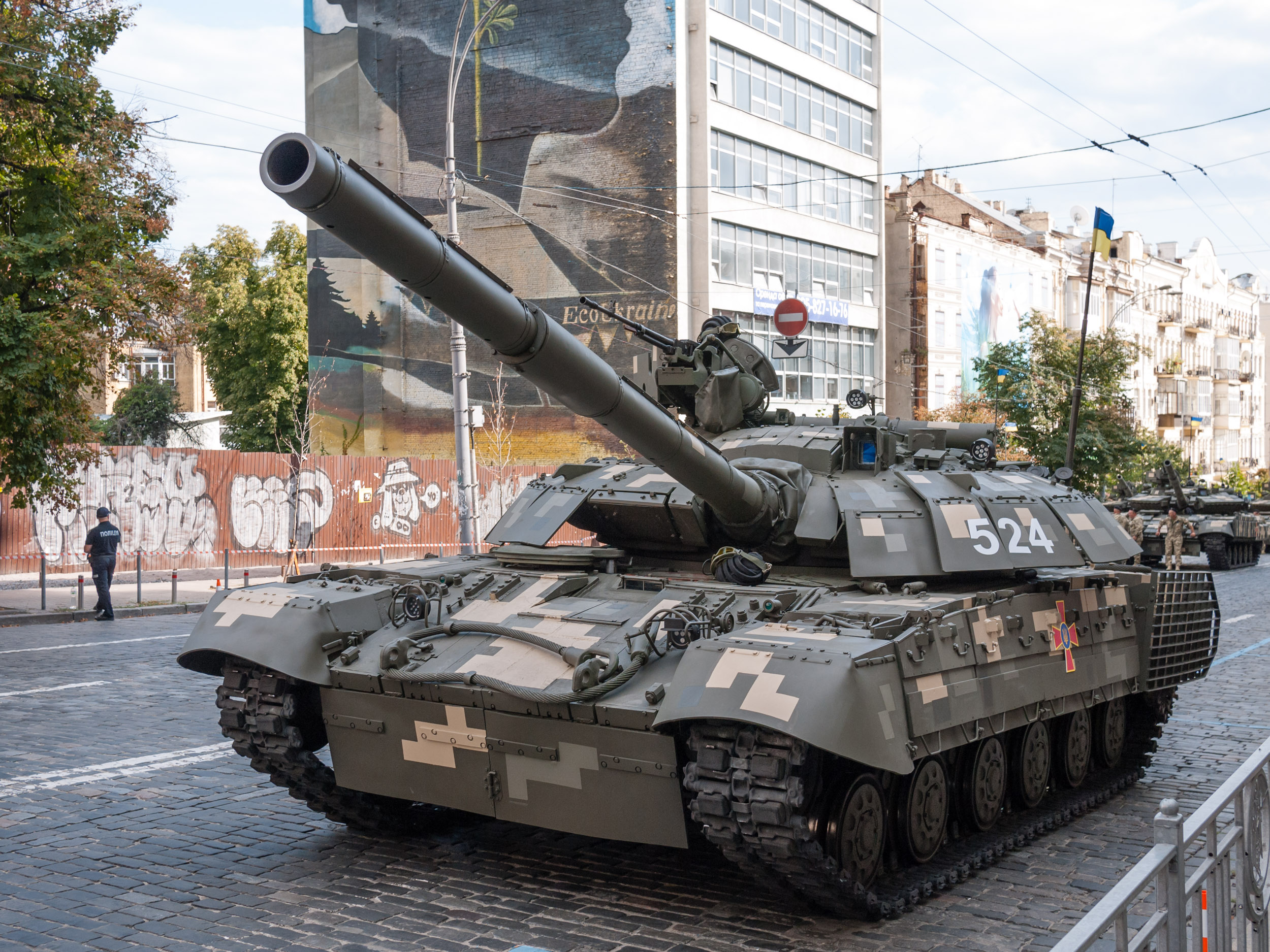
Ukrainian T-64BM2 equipped with Nizh

Nizh (Note: Also known as Nozh from Russian нож, which means 'knife') (Ukrainian: Ніж, lit. 'knife') is a brand of explosive reactive armour designed by the Kharkiv Morozov Machine Building Design Bureau and manufactured in Ukraine by the state enterprise Fundamental Center of Crucial Technologies (FCCT-Microtek). Nizh modules have been provided by the government of Ukraine for the upgrade of the Pakistani Al-Khalid tank.

Nizh modules are fitted to the exterior of a tank or other armored vehicle. As with all ERA modules, they are designed to explode when impacted by a weapon. Nizh modules differ from other ERA modules in that they are specifically designed to eliminate or minimize damage to adjacent modules, thus allowing for increased effectiveness against multiple weapon impacts, compared to other ERA module designs. However, within a single module, there are several grooves that run perpendicular to the path of the incoming projectile. Upon activation, these grooves are sequentially formed into long 'knife'-like penetrators by explosives behind the grooves, designed to break up the incoming projectile, be it a shaped charge jet, or kinetic long-rod penetrator.

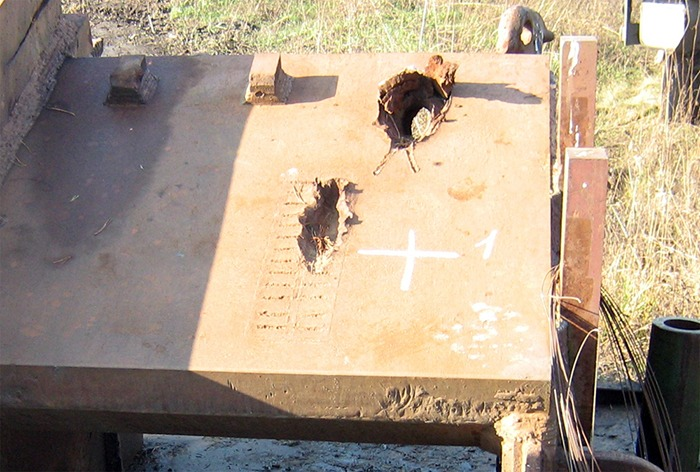
The result of hitting a APFSDS in the armor plate protected by the Nizh ERA during tests

== Variants and upgrades ==
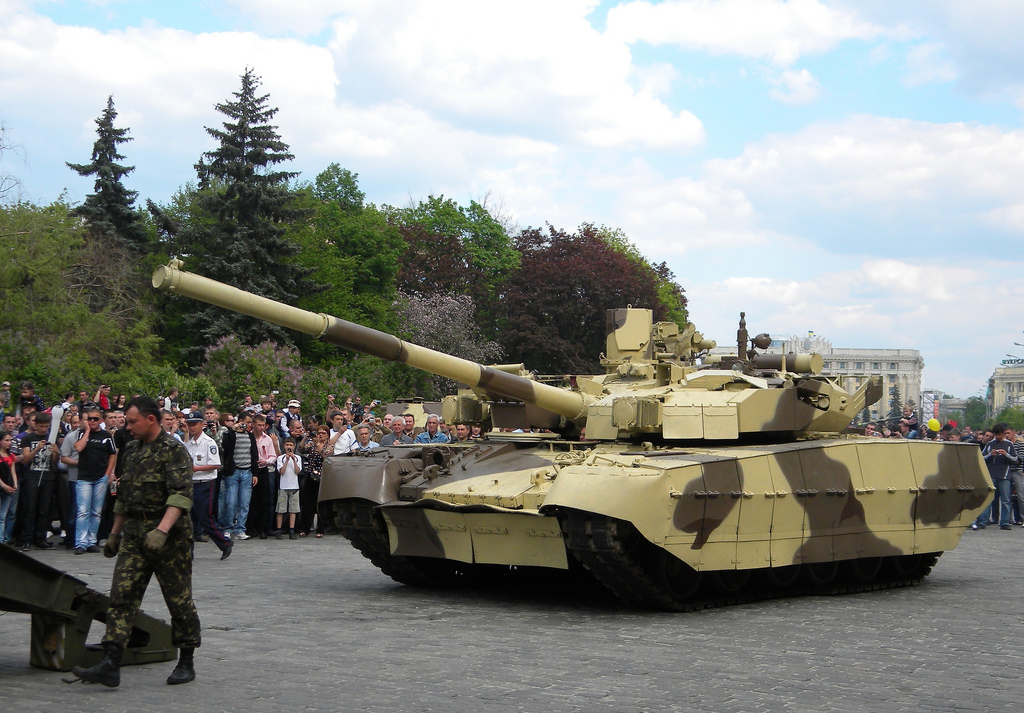
Ukrainian T-84 equipped with Duplet

=== Nizh-1M ===
Nizh-1M – an explosive reactive armour complex, based on HKChPWSH elements. The complex provides tanks with reliable protection against RPG/SPG grenades (reduction of destructive capacity up to 90%), shaped charge and armour-piercing projectiles (up to 80%), unitary anti-tank guided missiles (up to 70%) and explosively formed penetrators (up to 40%).

=== Nizh-LM ===
Nizh-LM is an explosive reactive armour complex based on HKChPWSH elements for light armored vehicles.

=== Duplet-2M ===
Duplet-2M (Ukrainian: Дупле́т) is a modular third-generation complex of tandem explosive reactive armour for tanks of Ukrainian production. A modernized version of the Nizh complex. Protection from tandem-charge projectiles is provided by a special tandem layout of elements.
