= T-64 =

Soviet main battle tank

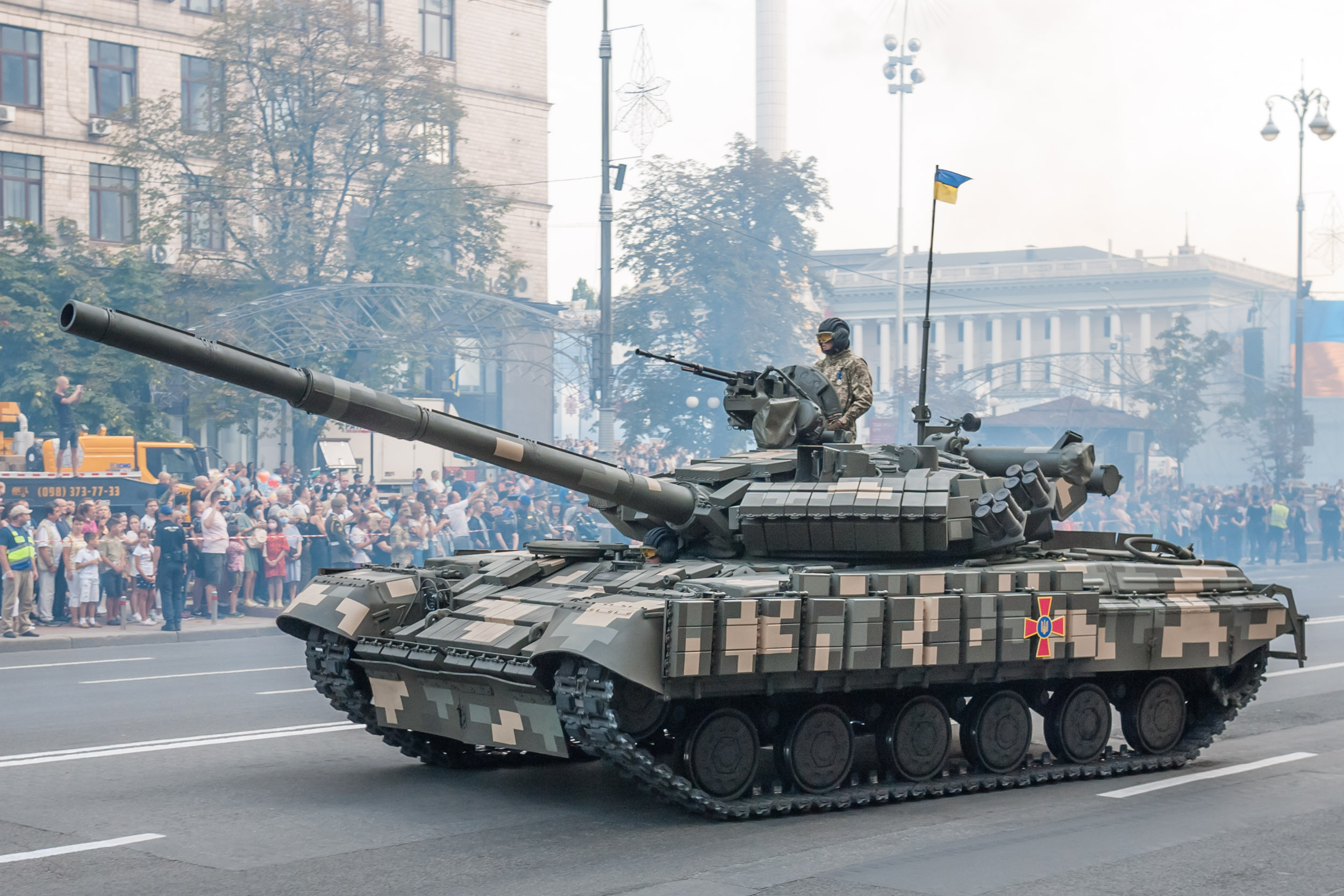
- A Ukrainian T-64BV model 2017 in 2021
- Type: Main battle tank
- Place of origin: Soviet Union

Service history
- In service: 1966–present
- Used by: See Operators
- Wars: Transnistria War; Angolan Civil War; Russo-Ukrainian War; War in Donbas; Russo-Ukrainian war; Kamwina Nsapu rebellion

Production history
- Designer: KMDB
- Designed: 1951–1962
- Manufacturer: Malyshev Factory
- Produced: 1963–1987
- No. built: ≈13,000

Specifications (T-64A)
- Mass: 38 tonnes (42 short tons; 37 long tons)
- Length: 9.225 m (30 ft 3.2 in) (gun forward)
- Width: 3.415 m (11 ft 2.4 in)
- Height: 2.172 m (7 ft 1.5 in)
- Crew: 3 (driver, commander, gunner)
- Armour: Glass-reinforced plastic sandwiched between layers of steel. ERA plates on later versions Hull & turret – 370 mm to 440 mm vs APFSDS; 500 mm to 575 mm vs HEAT
- Main armament: 125 mm smoothbore gun 2A26(M/M-1) (T-64A), 125 mm smoothbore gun D-81T (aka 2A46)
- Secondary armament: 7.62 mm PKMT coaxial machine gun, 12.7 mm NSVT anti-aircraft machine gun
- Engine: 5TDF 5-cylinder diesel 13.6 litre 700 hp (522 kW)
- Power/weight: 18.4 hp/tonne (13.7 kW/ton)
- Suspension: Torsion bar
- Operational range: 500 km (310 mi), 700 km (430 mi) with external tanks
- Maximum speed: 45–60 km/h (28–37 mph) depending on version

The T-64 is a Soviet tank manufactured in Kharkiv, and designed by Alexander Morozov. The tank was introduced in the early 1960s. It was a more advanced counterpart to the T-62: the T-64 served in tank divisions, while the T-62 supported infantry in motor rifle divisions. It introduced advanced features for its time such as composite armour, a compact engine and transmission, and a 125-mm smoothbore gun equipped with a carousel type autoloader to allow the crew to be reduced to three so the tank could be smaller and lighter. In spite of being armed and armoured like a heavy tank, the T-64 weighed only 38 tonnes (42 short tons; 37 long tons).

These features made the T-64 expensive to build, significantly more so than previous generations of Soviet tanks. This was especially true of the power plant, which was time-consuming to build and cost twice as much as more conventional designs. Several proposals were made to improve the T-64 with new engines, but chief designer Alexander Alexandrovich Morozov's political power in Moscow kept the design in production in spite of any concerns about price.

The T-64 formed the design basis of the Soviet T-80, which entered service in 1976. The tank is in use in a few nations or regions as of 2023. The T-64 is undergoing significant factory overhauls and modernization in Ukraine.

== Overview ==
The T-64 was conceived at the Kharkiv Morozov Machine Building Design Bureau, as the next-generation main battle tank by Alexander A. Morozov, the designer of the T-54 (which, in the meantime, would be incrementally improved by Leonid N. Kartsev's Nizhny Tagil bureau, by the models T-54A, T-54B, T-55, and T-55A).

The T-64 was the first Soviet tank to use an autoloader for its 125-mm gun, allowing one crew member's position to be omitted and helping to keep the size and weight of the tank down. Tank crewmen would joke that the designers had finally caught up with their unofficial hymn, Three Tankers, a song written to commemorate the crewmen fighting in the Battle of Khalkhin Gol, in 3-man BT-5 tanks in 1939.

The T-64 also pioneered other Soviet tank technology: the T-64A model of 1967 introduced the 125-mm smoothbore gun, and the T-64B of 1976 would be able to fire an anti-tank guided missile through its gun barrel. Soviet military planners considered the T-64 the first of the third-generation tanks and the first main battle tank.

The T-64 design was used as basis by LKZ for the gas turbine-powered T-80 main battle tank. The T-64A turret was adopted for early T-80 tank models, with its main gun and automatic loading mechanism, and upgraded armour.

The T-64 was only supplied to the Soviet Army and its successors. It was never exported before 1991, unlike the T-54/55. The tank equipped elite and regular formations in Eastern Europe and elsewhere, the T-64A model being first deployed with East Germany's Group of Soviet Forces in Germany (GSFG) in 1976, and some time later in Hungary's Southern Group of Forces (SFG). By 1981, the improved T-64B began to be deployed in East Germany and later in Hungary. While it was believed that the T-64 was reserved for elite units, it was also used by much lower level "non-ready formations", for example, the Odessa Military District's 14th Army.

With the break-up of the Soviet Union in 1991, T-64 tanks remained in the arsenals of Russia, Ukraine, Belarus and Uzbekistan. In mid-2014, nearly 2,000 of the former Soviet inventory of T-64 tanks were in service with the military of Ukraine and about 4,000 were out of service and awaiting destruction in Russia.

== Development history ==
=== Object 430 ===
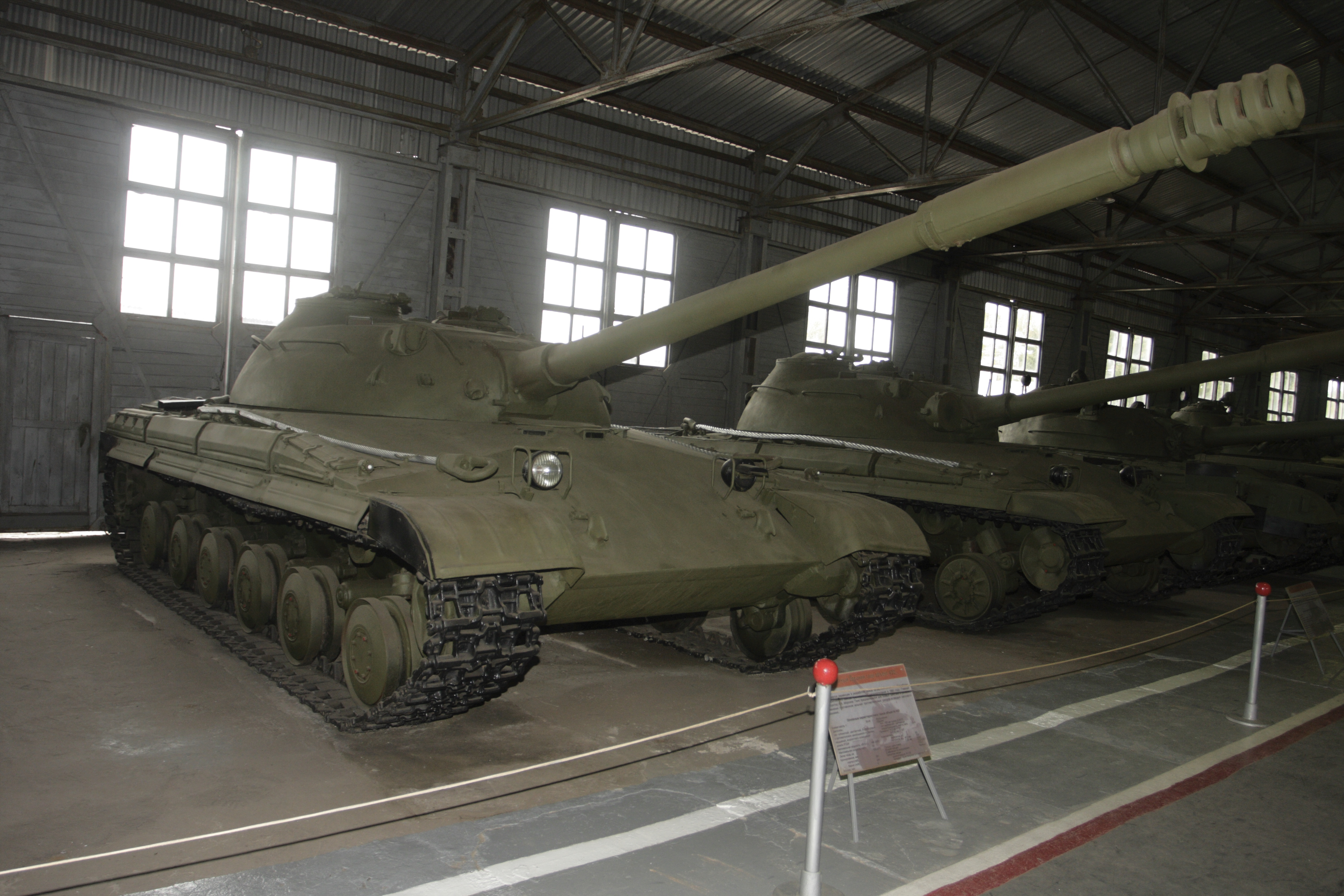
Object 430 prototype on display at the Kubinka Tank Museum in September 2008

Studies for the design of a new battle tank started in 1951. The KB-60M team was formed at the Kharkiv design bureau of the Kharkiv transport machine-building factory No. 75 named for Malyshev (Russian: конструкторское бюро Харьковского завода транспортного машиностроения No. 75 им. Малышева) by engineers coming back from Nizhniy Tagil, with Morozov at its head.

A project named object 430 led to three prototypes which were tested at Kubinka in 1958. Those vehicles had characteristics that would influence and radically alter the design of tanks on the eastern side of the Iron Curtain. For the first time, a compact opposed-piston engine was used: the 4TD, designed by the plant's engine design team. The transmission system comprised two lateral gears on each side of the engine. Those two innovations yielded a very short engine compartment with the opening located beneath the turret. The engine compartment volume was almost half that of the T-54. An improved cooling system and a new lightweight suspension was fitted, featuring hollow metallic wheels of a small diameter and caterpillar tracks with rubber joints.

The tank would be armed with the D-54TS and would have frontal armour of 120 mm. As it did not present a clear superiority in combat characteristics when compared to the T-55, which was entering active service, Morozov decided that production was not yet ready given the project's drawbacks. However, studies conducted on the Object 430U, featuring a 122 mm gun and 160 mm of armour, demonstrated that the tank had the potential to carry the firepower and armour of a heavy tank on to a medium tank chassis. A new project was consequently started, the Object 432.

=== Object 432 ===
The gun fitted on this new tank was a 115 mm D-68 (2A21). This was a potentially risky decision to replace the human loader by an electro-hydraulic automatic system, since the technology was new to Russian designers. The crew was reduced to three, which allowed a considerable reduction in internal volume and external visible silhouette, and consequently in weight, from 36 tonnes (obyekt 430) to 30.5 tonnes. The height dropped by 76 mm.

The arrival of the British 105 mm L7 gun and the US M68 variant of it, fitted to the Centurion and M60 tanks, forced the team to adopt composite armour. The recently created process was called "K combination" by Western armies: this protection consisted of an aluminium alloy layer between two high strength steel layers. As a consequence, the weight of the prototype rose eventually to 34 tonnes. But, as the engine was now a 700 hp (515 kW) 5TDF (also locally designed), its mobility remained superior to that of the T-62. The Object 432 was ready in September 1962 and production started in October 1963 in the Kharkiv plant. On 30 December 1966, it entered service as the T-64.

=== T-64A ===
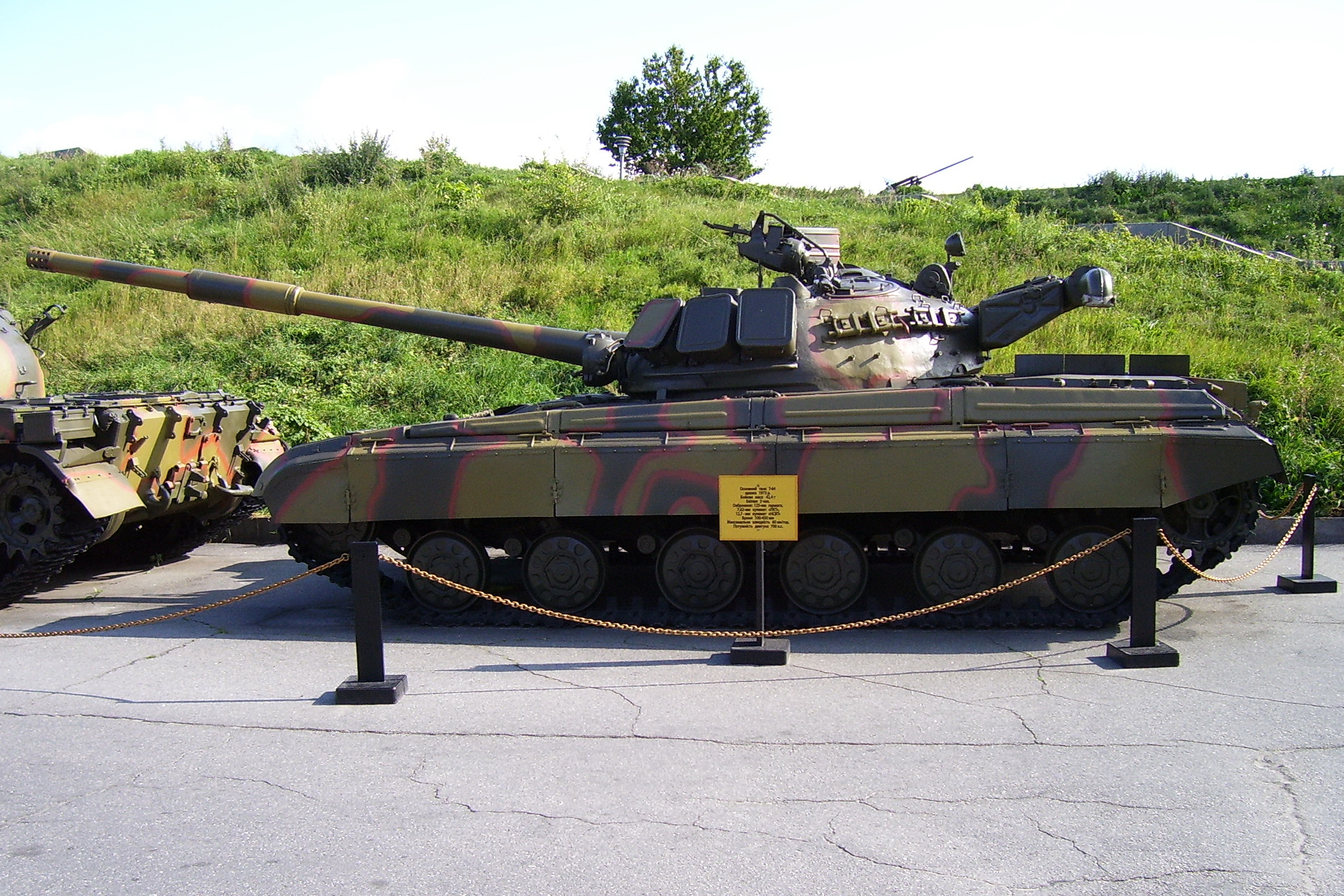
Obyekt 447 at the National Museum of the History of Ukraine in the Second World War, Kyiv, Ukraine

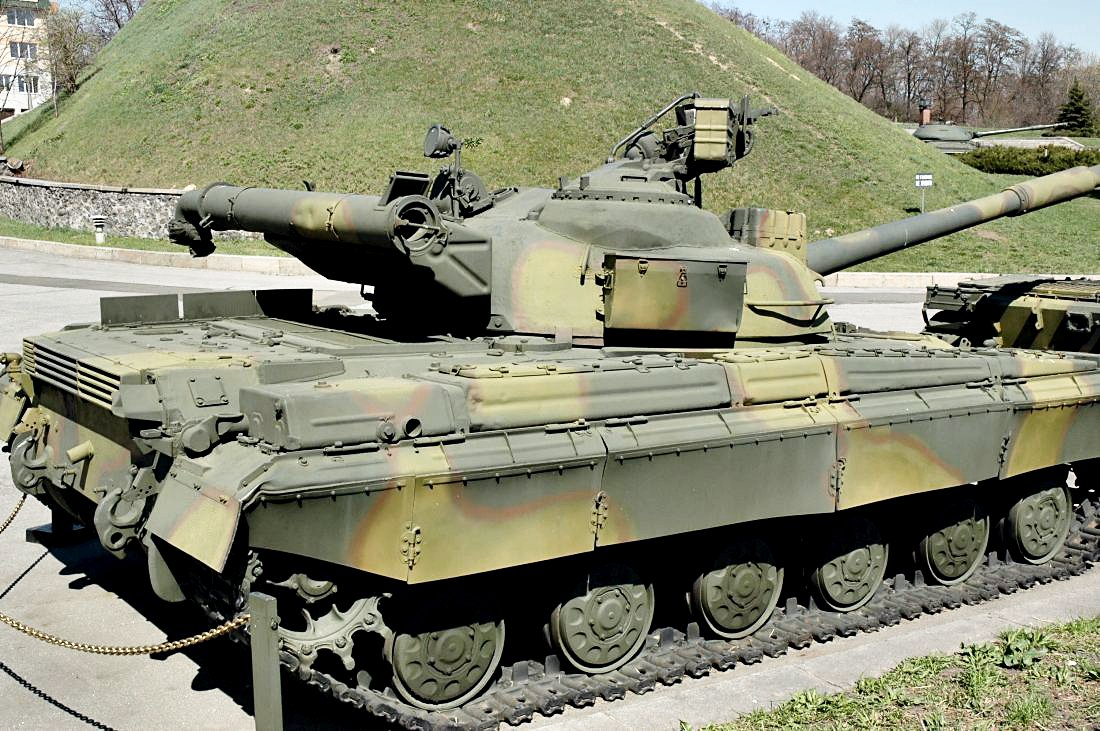
The T-64 has a characteristic exhaust vent in the rear

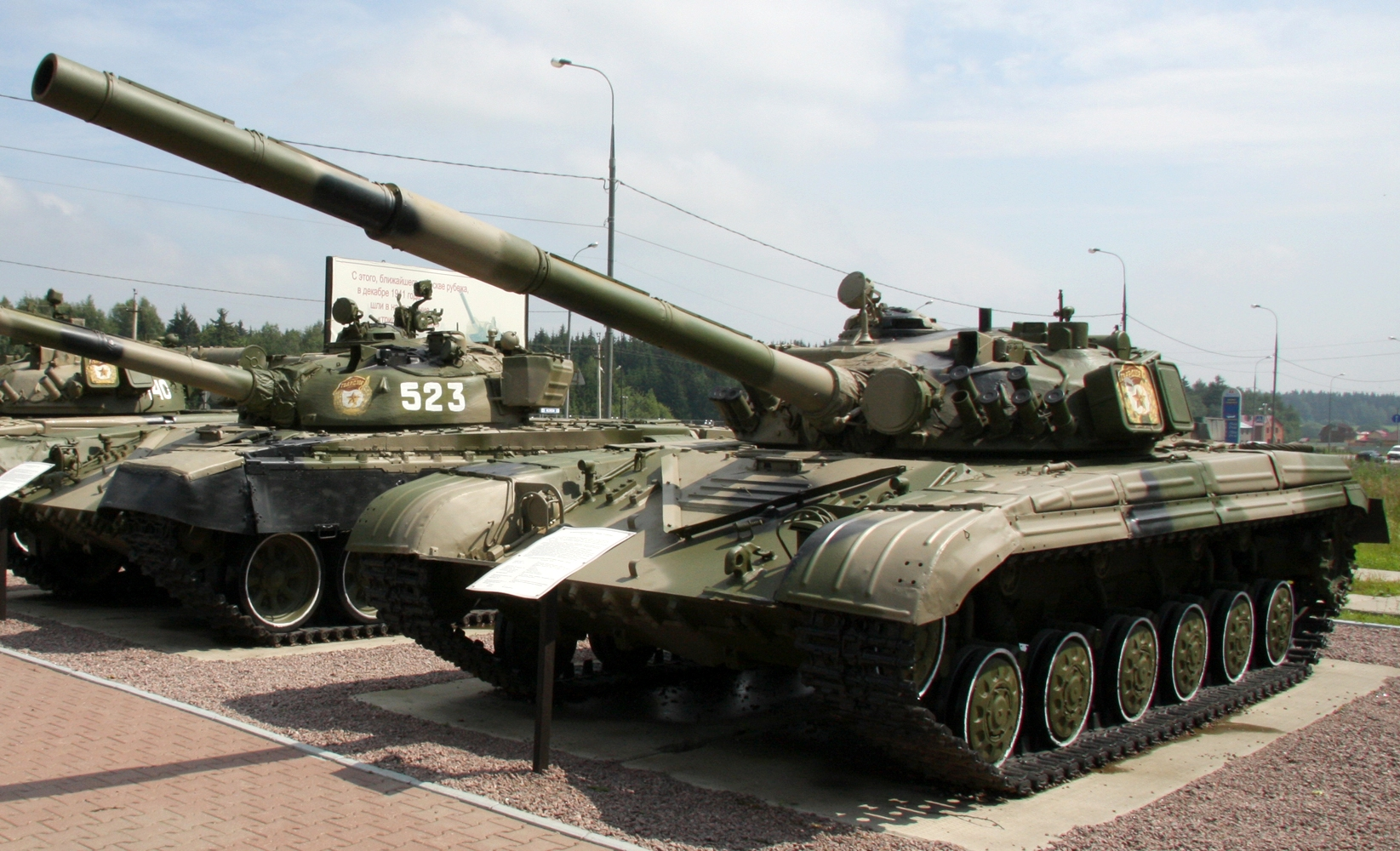
T-64AK at the T-34 Tank History Museum in Russia

Even as the first T-64s were rolling off the assembly lines, the design team was working on a new version, named Object 434, which would allow it to maintain firepower superiority. The new 125 mm D-81T gun, from the Perm weapons factory, was fitted to the tank. This gun was a scaled-up version of the 115 mm smoothbore cannon from the T-62. The larger size of the 125 mm ammunition meant that less could be carried inside the T-64, and with a fourth crewman loader taking up space as well, the tank would only have a 25-round capacity. This was unacceptably low for the Soviet designers, but strict dimensional parameters forbade them from enlarging the tank to increase interior space. The solution was to replace the human loader with a mechanical autoloader, cutting the crew to three and marking the first use of autoloaders in a Soviet MBT. The 6ETs10 autoloader has 28 rounds and can fire 8 shots per minute; the stabiliser, a 2E23, was coupled to the new TPD-2-1 (1G15-1) sight. Night driving was also supported with the new TPN-1-43A periscope, which would benefit from the illumination of an infrared L2G projector, fitted on the left side of the gun. The shielding was improved, with fibreglass replacing the aluminium alloy in the armour, and small spring-mounted plates fitted along the mudguards (known as the gill skirt), to cover the top of the suspension and the side tanks. They were extremely fragile and were often removed. Some small storage spaces were created along the turret, with a compartment on the right and three boxes on the front left. Snorkels were mounted on the rear of the turret. An NBC protection system was fitted and the hatches were widened.

Prototypes were tested in 1966 and 1967 and, as production began after the six hundredth T-64, it entered service in the Soviet Army under the designation T-64A. Chief engineer Morozov was awarded the Lenin Prize for this model's success.

Designed for elite troops, the T-64A was constantly updated as available equipment was improved. After three years in service, a first modernisation occurred, comprising:

- fire control, by replacing the sights with the TPD-2-49 day sight with an optical coincidence rangefinder and a TPN-1-49-23 night sight, and stabilisation by mounting a 2E26 system.
- the radio by mounting a R-123M
- night vision with a TBN-4PA for the driver and a TNP-165A for the tank leader. His post was transformed by mounting a small stabilised turret with an anti-aircraft NSVT 12.7 mm × 108 machine gun, electrically guided through an optical PZU-5 sight, and fed with 300 rounds. It could be used from within the tank so that the tank leader could avoid being exposed (as on previous tanks). The possibility of mounting a KMT-6 anti-mine system was also added.

A derived version appeared at the same time, designed for the commanding officer and named T-64AK. It comprised a R-130M radio with a 10 m telescopic antenna, which could be used only in a static position as it required shrouds, an artillery aiming circle PAB-2AM and TNA-3 navigation station; all of these could be powered by an auxiliary petrol generator.

In 1976, the weapons system was improved by mounting a D-81TM (2A46-1), stabilised by a 2E28M2, supplied by an automatic 6ETs10M. The night sight was replaced by a TNPA-65 and the engine could accept different fuels, including diesel fuel, kerosene or petrol. The production, first carried on the B variant, stopped in 1980.

The majority of T-64As were further modernised after 1981, by mounting a six smoke grenade-launcher 81 mm 902A on each side of the gun, and by replacing the gill plates by a rubber skirt for a longer life. Some of them seem to have been fitted with reactive bricks (as the T-64AV) after 1985, or even with laser TPD-K1 telemeters instead of the optical TPD-2-49 optical coincidence rangefinder (1981). Almost all T-64s were modernised into T-64R, between 1977 and 1981, by reorganising external storage and snorkels, similar to the T-64A.

=== T-64B ===
The design team was carrying on its work on new versions. Problems with the setup of the 5TDF engine occurred as the local production capacity was proven to be insufficient against a production done in three factories (Malyshev in Kharkiv, Kirov in Leningrad and Uralvagonzavod).

From 1961, an alternative to the Object 432 was studied, with a 12 V-cylinder V-45 engine: the Object 436. Three prototypes were tested in 1966 in the Chelyabinsk factory. The order was to develop a model derived from the 434 with the same engine given to the Object 438, later renamed as the Object 439. Four tanks of this type were built and tested in 1969, which showed the same mobility as the production version, but mass production was not started. They served as a basis for the design of the T-72 engine compartment.

At the beginning of the 1970s, the design team was trying to improve the tank further. The T-64A-2M study in 1973, with its more powerful engine and its reinforced turret, served as a basis for two projects:

- Object 476 with a 6TD 1000 hp (735 kW) engine which served as a model for the T-80 combat compartment.
- Object 447 which featured a new fire control with a laser telemeter, and which was able to fire gun launched anti-tank guided missiles.

For the latter, the order was given to start its production under the name T-64B, as well as a derived version (which shared 95% of its components), the Object 437, without the missile guidance system for cost reasons. The latter was almost twice as much produced under the designation T-64B1. On 3 September 1976, the T-64B and the T-64B1 were accepted for service, featuring the improved D-81Tm gun (2A46-2) with a 2E26M stabiliser, a 6ETs40 loader and a 1A33 fire control, including:

- a 1V517 ballistic calculator
- a 1G21 sight with laser telemetry
- a 1B11 cross-wind sensor.

Its ford capacity reaches 1.8 m without equipment. The T-64B had the ability to fire the new 9M112 "Kobra" radio-guided missile (NATO code "AT-8 Songster"). The vehicle then carries 8 missiles and 28 shells. The missile control system is mounted in front of the commander's small turret and has many changes. The T-64B1 carries only 37 shells and has 2,000 7.62 mm rounds, against 1,250 for the T-64B.

They were modernised in 1981 by the replacement of the gun by a 2A46M1, the stabiliser by a 2E42, and the mounting of a 902A "Tucha-1" smoke grenade launcher in two groups of four, on each side of the gun. Two command versions exist, similar to the T-64AK: the T-64BK and the T-64B1K.

The decision in October 1979 to start production of the 6TD engine, and its great similarity to the 5TDF engine, allowed it to be fitted in versions B and B1, but also A and AK, yielding the new models T-64AM, T-64AKM, T-64BM and T-64B1M, entering service in 1983.

Production of all versions ended in 1987. Total production reached almost 13,000.

=== Modernisation in Ukraine ===
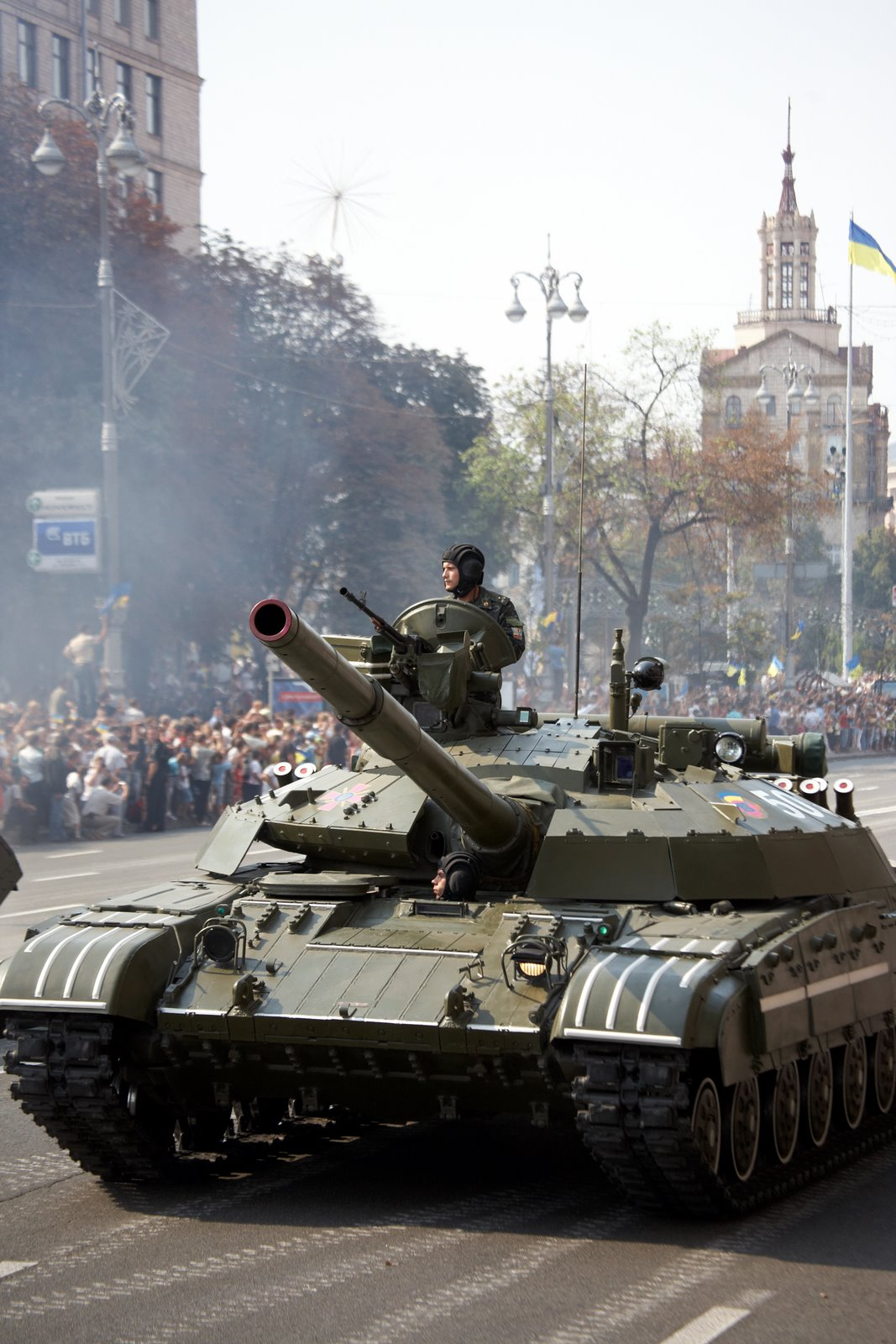
Ukrainian T-64BM Bulat on parade

After the dissolution of the Soviet Union, Ukraine carried on the development of T-64 modernisation, as the original and main factory was in this country. As a result, modernised variants of the T-64 had become the most common tank in the Ukrainian inventory by 2022. Two different upgrade packages were developed in 1999:

- T-64BM2 with a 57DFM 850-hp (625 kW) engine, a new 1A43U fire control, a new 6ETs43 loader and the ability to fire the 9M119 missile (NATO code "AT-11 Sniper").
- T-64U which integrated on top the 1A45 fire control (from the T-80U and T-84), PNK-4SU and TKN-4S optics for the tank commander and PZU-7 for the AA machine gun. The commander is then able to drive the tank and to use the gun directly if needed.

The two variants are also protected by Kontakt-5 modular reactive armour, able to resist kinetic energy projectiles, as opposed to the first models which were efficient only against high-explosive anti-tank (HEAT) shaped charge ammunition. Those two variants could also be fitted with the 6TDF 1,000 hp (735 kW) engine.

- T-64BM Bulat Ukrainian army on use modernization, incorporating Nizh (Knife) reactive armour that offers better performance dealing with tandem warheads than the Soviet Kontakt-5, new Ukrainian-made 125 mm KBA3 gun, TO1-KO1ER night sight and capability of firing the Ukrainian Kombat tandem-warhead anti-tank guided missile.

In 2010, the Kharkiv Malyshev Factory upgraded ten T-64B tanks (originally produced in Kharkiv in 1980) to T-64BM Bulat standard, and a further nineteen were delivered in 2011. These twenty-nine tanks were upgraded under a ₴200 million ($25.1M) contract signed in April 2009. As of October 2011, the Ukrainian Army has 76 T-64BM Bulat in service. According to Malyshev Factory chief engineer Konstantin Isyak, the T-64BM Bulat is armoured to the level of modern tanks. It has Nizh (Knife) reactive armour, and Varta active protection system. The Bulat weighs 45 tonnes (44 long tons), and with its 850 hp (630 kW) 5TDFM multi-fuel diesel engine can travel at 70 km/h (43 mph), with a range of 385 km (239 mi). It retains the 125 mm smoothbore gun with an autoloader for 28 rounds, some of which can be guided missiles. It has a 12.7 mm AA machinegun, and a 7.62 mm coaxial machinegun.

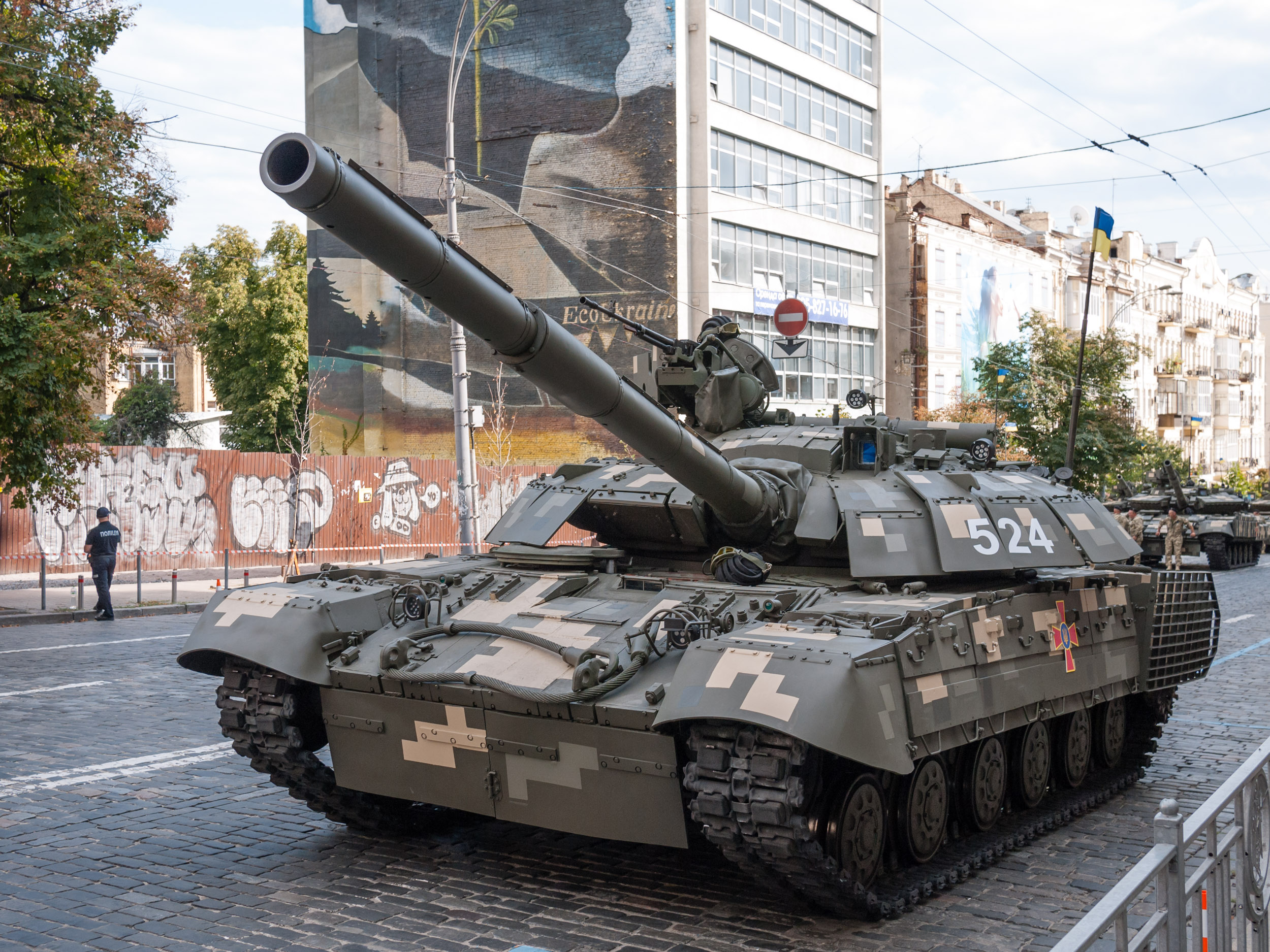
T-64BM2 Bulat during preparations for the 2021 Independence Day parade

- T-64BM2 Bulat

A 2019 modernization program with TPN-1TPV thermal sight, 1A43U fire-control system, 1H46M sight for the Kombat ATGM, Lybid-2 radios, Basalt battlefield information system, raised turret ring, improved KhSChVK Nizh reactive armour, armour shield above the commander's cupola, 12 mm armour for external fuel tanks, anti-RPG screens beside the engine compartment, and new 1000-hp 6TD-1 engine and transmission (new 5TD engines were no longer manufactured). This was conducted at the Kharkiv Armoured-Vehicle Plant (KhBTZ), with the engine compartment enlarged for the new engine by the Malyshev Factory (ZIM). Upgraded tanks were field tested in April 2021, and several were paraded in the August Independence Day parade.

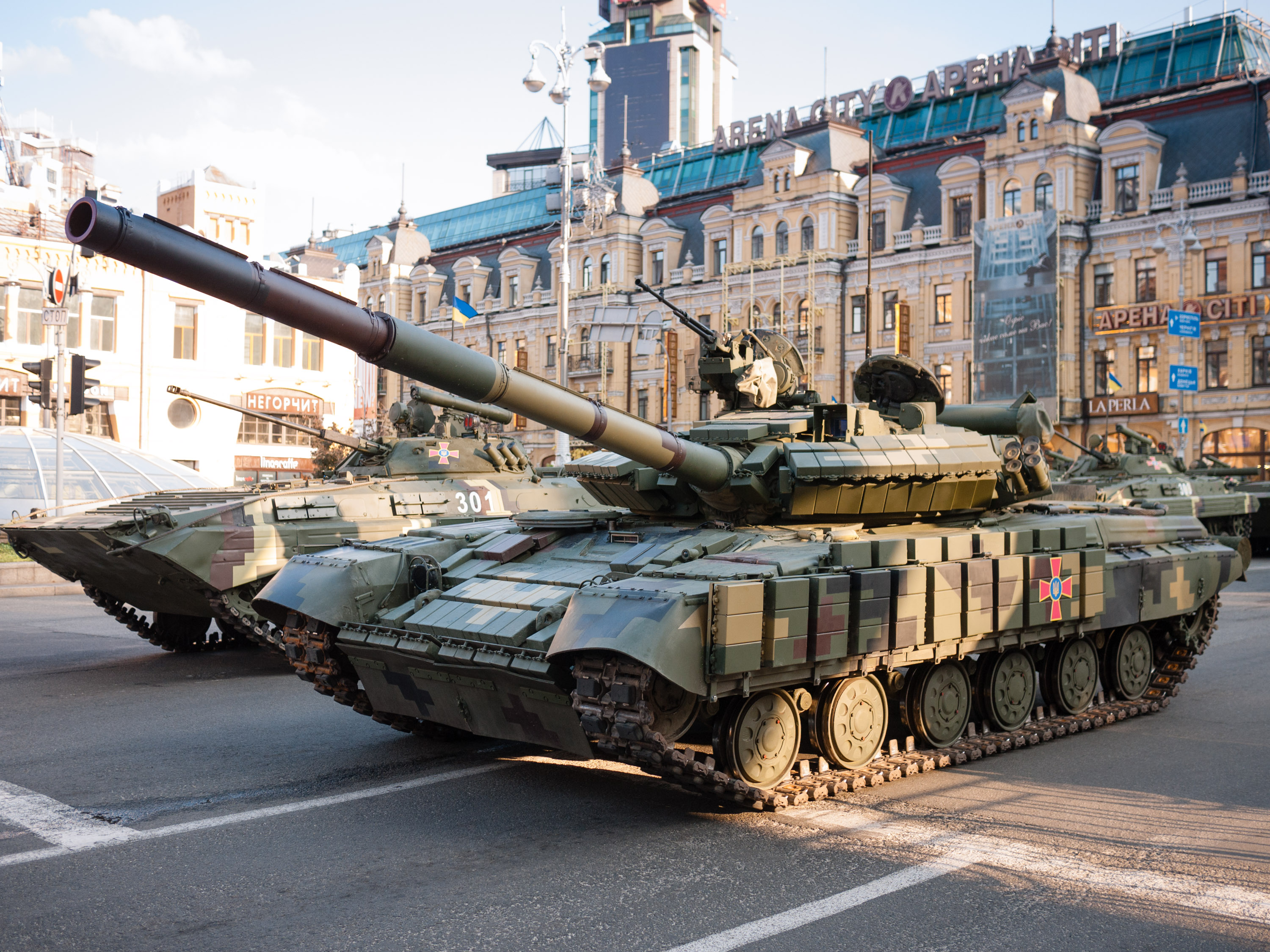
T-64BV model 2017 during a rehearsal for the Independence Day parade in Kyiv, August 2018. This version is recognizable by the absence of an infrared searchlight on the left of the main gun.

- T-64BV model 2017

In 2019, Ukroboronprom reported that the Kharkiv Armoured Plant (KhBTZ) had delivered over 100 updated tanks to the Ukrainian Armed Forces. The upgraded tanks included new thermal imaging for all crew, remove Luna infrared searchlight, include TPN-1-TPV Ukrainian night sight in place of TPN1-49-23, Nizh reactive armour modules designed for bolt-on replacement on T-64BV turrets, SN-4215 networked satellite navigation unit, and Lybid K-2RB digital radio (under license from Motorola) providing secure communications with a 70 km range. In August 2019, Ukroboronprom announced the Lviv Armoured Plant (LBTZ) had also started modernizing T-64s to the 2017 standard.

- T-64BV model 2022

In early 2022 Ukroboronprom was reported to be testing another modernization of the T-64BV, ordered by the Ministry of Defence of Ukraine. The tank has "new third-generation surveillance and sighting units" and is equipped with a new 12.7mm Snipex Laska K-2 heavy machine gun. It features "new up-to-date radio stations" and additional "navigation, internal and external communication systems which fully meets NATO standards." The exterior fuel tanks are now also protected by 12mm steel plates.

== Production history ==
Sources differ on the initial production date of the tank that is set between 1963 and 1967, but it is established that the T-64 formally entered service with the Soviet army in 1967 and was publicly revealed in 1970. The T-64 was KMDB's high-technology offering, intended to replace the IS-3 and T-10 heavy tanks in independent tank battalions. Meanwhile, the T-72 was intended to supersede the T-55 and T-62 in equipping the bulk of the Soviet tank and mechanised forces, as well as for export partners and east-block satellite states.

The T-64 introduced a new autoloader, which is still used on all T-64s currently in service, as well as all variants of the T-80 except the Ukrainian T-84-120. T-64 prototypes and the first several hundred examples produced had the same 115 mm smoothbore gun as the T-62; the T-64A and subsequent full-scale production variants had the 125 mm gun.

While the T-64 was the superior tank, it was more expensive and physically complex, and was produced in smaller numbers. The T-72 is mechanically simpler and easier to service in the field, and its manufacturing process is correspondingly simpler. In light of Soviet doctrine, the superior T-64s were kept ready and reserved for the most important mission: a potential outbreak of a war in Europe.

In Soviet times, T-64 was mostly in service with units stationed in East Germany opposing the Chieftain-equipped units of the British Army of the Rhine. No T-64s were exported. Many T-64s ended up in Russian and Ukrainian service after the breakup of the Soviet Union.

=== Models ===
- Ob'yekt 430 (1957) – Prototype with D-10T 100-mm gun, 120 mm armour, 4TPD 580 hp (427 kW) engine, 36 tonnes.
- Ob'yekt 430U – Project, equipped with a 122-mm gun and 160 mm of armour.
- T-64 or Ob'yekt 432 (1961) – Prototype with a D-68 115-mm gun, then initial production version with the same features, about 600 tanks produced.
- T-64R (remontirniy, rebuilt) or Ob'yekt 432R – T-64s rebuilt between 1977 and 1981 with equipment from the T-64A. Retained 115-mm gun.
- T-64A or Ob'yekt 434 – 125-mm gun, "gill" armour skirts, a modified sight, and suspension on the fourth road wheel.
- T-64T (1963) – Experimental version with a GTD-3TL 700 hp (515 kW) gas turbine.
- Ob'yekt 436 – Alternative version of Ob'yekt 432 with a V-45 engine. Three built.
- Ob'yekt 438 and Ob'yekt 439 – Ob'yekt 434 with V-45 diesel engine.
- T-64AK or Ob'yekt 446 (1972) – Command version, with a R-130M radio and its 10 m (33 ft) telescoping antenna, a TNA-3 navigation system, without antiaircraft machine gun, carrying 38 rounds of main gun ammunition.
- Ob'yekt 447 – Prototype of the T-64B. Basically a T-64A fitted with the 9K112 "Kobra" system and a 1G21 gunsight. This is the "T-64A" displayed in the Kyiv museum.
- T-64B or Ob'yekt 447A (1976) – Fitted with redesigned armour, 1A33 fire control system, 9K112-1 "Kobra" ATGM system (NATO code "AT-8 Songster"), TPN-1-49-23 sight, 2A46-2 gun, 2E26M stabiliser and 6ETs40 loader. Later B/BV models have more modern systems 1A33-1, TPN-3-49, 2E42 and a 2A46M-1 gun. From 1985 the T-64B was fitted with stronger glacis armour; older tanks were upgraded with a 16-mm armour plate. Tanks equipped with the 1,000 hp 6TD engine are known as T-64BM.
- T-64BV – Features "Kontakt-1" reactive armour and "Tucha" 81-mm smoke grenade launchers on the left of the turret.
- T-64BM2 or Ob'yekt 447AM-2 – "Kontakt-5" reactive armour, rubber protection skirts, 1A43U fire control, 6ETs43 loader and able to fire the 9K119 missile (NATO code "AT-11A Sniper"), 5TDFM 850 hp (625 kW) engine.
- T-64U, T-64BM Bulat, or Ob'yekt 447AM-1 – Ukrainian modernisation, bringing the T-64B to the standard of the T-84. Fitted with Nizh reactive armour, 9K120 Refleks missile (NATO code AT-11 Sniper), 1A45 Irtysh fire control, TKN-4S commander's sight, PZU-7 antiaircraft machine-gun sight, TPN-4E Buran-E night vision, 6TDF 1,000-hp (735 kW) engine. T-64U is one of 2 variants of the modernization program in 1990s, while Bulat is the most recent modernization from 2004.
- T-64B1 or Ob'yekt 437 – Same as the B without the fire control system and "Kobra", carrying 37 shells.
- T-64B1M – T-64B1 equipped with the 1,000-hp 6TD engine, redesigned turret and improved armour. Modernization program from 1970s (resulted in T-64AM, AKM, BM and B1M; BM is not the same as T-64BM "Bulat" from 2004). Never entered mass production.
- T-64BK and T-64B1K or Ob'yekt 446B – Command versions, with an R-130M radio and its 10-m telescoping antenna, a TNA-3 navigation system and AB-1P/30 APU, without antiaircraft machine gun, carrying 28 shells.
- Obyekt 476 – Five prototypes with the 6TDF engine, prototypes for T-80UD development.
- BREM-64 or Ob'yekt 447T – Armoured recovery vehicle with a light 2.5-tonne crane, dozer blade, tow bars, welding equipment, etc. Only a small number were built.
- T-55-64 – Heavily upgraded T-55 with the complete hull and chassis of the T-64, fitted with "Kontakt-1" ERA. Prototype.
- T-Rex – Ukrainian T-64 concept with unmanned turret.
- T-64 With T-72A Turret - An Uzbekistani T-64 that had the T-72A turret installed.

==== Modernisations ====
T-64

- 1977–1981 – brought to the T-64R standard, reorganisation of external equipment as on the T-64A.

T-64A, T-64AK

- 1972 redesign, fire control improvement (TPD-2-49 and TPN-1-49-23), inclusion of the NSVT machine gun on an electrical turret, R-123M radio.
- 1973 redesigned turret with improved armour protection.
- 1975 redesign, new 2E28M stabiliser, 6ETs10M loader, multi-fuel engine, 2A46-1 gun and TNPA-65 night vision.
- 1979 introduced smoke grenade launchers "Tucha".
- 1980 rubber skirts on the suspension instead of the Gill protection.
- 1981 redesign, two sets of six 902A smoke grenade launchers.
- 1983 T-64AM,T-64AKM, some tanks were equipped with the 6TDF engine during maintenance.
- 1985 installation of ERA "Kontakt-1" during overhaul. Upgraded tanks designated T-64AV. Due to ERA installation, "Tucha" was repositioned from the front of the turret to the left side.

T-64B, T-64B1, T-64BK, T-64B1K

- 1979 introduced smoke grenade launchers "Tucha".
- 1980 rubber skirts on the suspension instead of the Gill protection.
- 1981 redesign, 2 sets of four 902B2 smoke grenade launchers (in fact this is related to the ERA installation since 1985), 2A26M1 gun.
- 1983 T-64BM,T-64B1M,T-64BMK and T-64B1MK: some tanks were equipped with the 6TDF engine during maintenance.
- 1985 T-64BV,T-64BV1,T-64BVK and T-64BV1K: with "Kontakt-1" reactive armour, smoke grenade launchers on the left of the turret.
- BM Bulat – T-64 modernization by the Malyshev Factory in Ukraine (see above).
- 2011 T-64E
- 2017 T-64BV type 2017: Night sight TPN1-49-23 replaced with TPN-1-TPV from Trimen-Ukraine, added СН-4215 satellite navigation system from Orizon-Navihatsiia, new Lybid-K 2RB digital radio, Luna infrared searchlight removed, and improved reactive armour units. This upgrade for T-64BV tanks was received by the 14th Mechanized Brigade, participated in Strong Europe Tank Challenge 2017, and over two hundred of these were in service by 2020.
- 2020 T-64MV – T-64 modernization for the Armed Forces of the Republic of Uzbekistan, consists of an installation of a more modern engine, ERA, slat armour and a digital radio system.

==== Variants ====
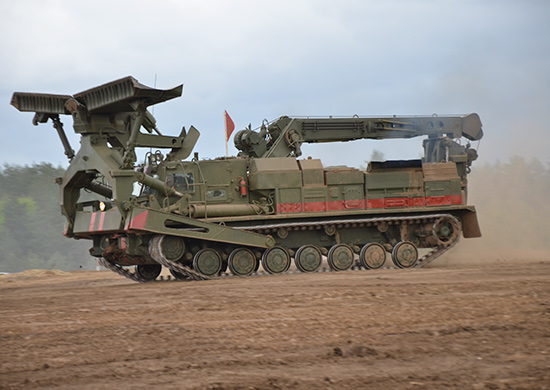
BAT-2 combat engineering vehicle

- BMPV-64 – Heavy infantry fighting vehicle, based on the chassis of the T-64 but with a completely redesigned hull with a single entry hatch in the rear. Armament consists of a remote-controlled 30mm autocannon and 7.62 mm machine gun. Combat weight is 34.5 tons. The first prototype was ready in 2005.
- BTRV-64 – Similar APC version.
- UMBP-64 – Modified version that will serve as the basis for several (planned) specialized vehicles, including a fire support vehicle, an ambulance and an air-defence vehicle.
- BMPT-K-64 – This variant is not tracked but has a new suspension with 4 axles, similar to the Soviet BTR series. The vehicle is powered by a 5TDF-A/700 engine and has a combat weight of 17.7 tons. It is fitted with a RCWS and can transport 3+8 men. Prototype only.
- BMPT-64 "Strazh" (Cyrillic: Страж, translates to guardian) – Fire support vehicle armed with 2 30mm autocannons, 2 PK machine guns, 4 ATGM-launchers and one AG-17 grenade launcher, developed by Zhytomyr Armoured Plant.
- BMPT Azovets – One-off Ukrainian heavy infantry fighting vehicle equipped with Stugna ATGMs and 23mm GSh-23 autocannons. It was built by the Azov Engineering Group in 2015.

- BAT-2 – Fast combat engineering vehicle with the engine, lower hull and "small roadwheels" suspension of the T-64. The 40-ton tractor sports a very large, all axis adjustable V-shaped hydraulic dozer blade at the front, a single soil ripper spike at the rear and a 2-ton crane on the top. The crew compartment holds 8 persons (driver, commander and radio operator, plus a five-man sapper squad for dismounted tasks). The BAT-2 was designed to replace the old T-54/AT-T based BAT-M, but Warsaw Pact allies received only small numbers due to its high price and the old and new vehicles served together during the late Cold War.
- UMR-64 – Ukrainian development using surplus T-64s to create a Heavy APC/IFV design, which in turn is intended as the basis of a new family of combat and support vehicles. The basic conversion includes moving the engine compartment forward, and at the same time removing the turret and normal crew compartment. This allows the installation of any one of 15 different 'functional modules', weighing up to 22 tons. One resulting option is the Heavy IFV, designated BMP-64E, which combines accommodation for up to 10 troops (not including the driver) with a remote weapons system. The Heavy APC version is designated the BTR-64E, and can not only carry more troops (at the cost of the RWS) but comes with large armoured double hatches at the rear for rapid loading and disembarkation. Other options include a universal supplies carrier (UMBP-64), a 'highly secure command and staff car with a weight up to 41 tons', and a 120 mm mortar carrier. The Kharkiv Armour Repair Plant (Zavod 311) is behind the project. Current status of the program is unclear as of early 2014.

== Service history ==
=== Soviet Union ===
The T-64 entered service in 1967 with the 41st Guards Tank Division in the Kiev Military District, the suggestion being that this was prudent due to the proximity of the division to the factory, and significant teething problems during induction into service that required constant presence of factory support personnel with the division during acceptance and initial crew and service personnel training on the new type. It appears that the tank remained secret to the West for some years between its entry into production in the early 1960s and the official acceptance in the Soviet Army in 1967.

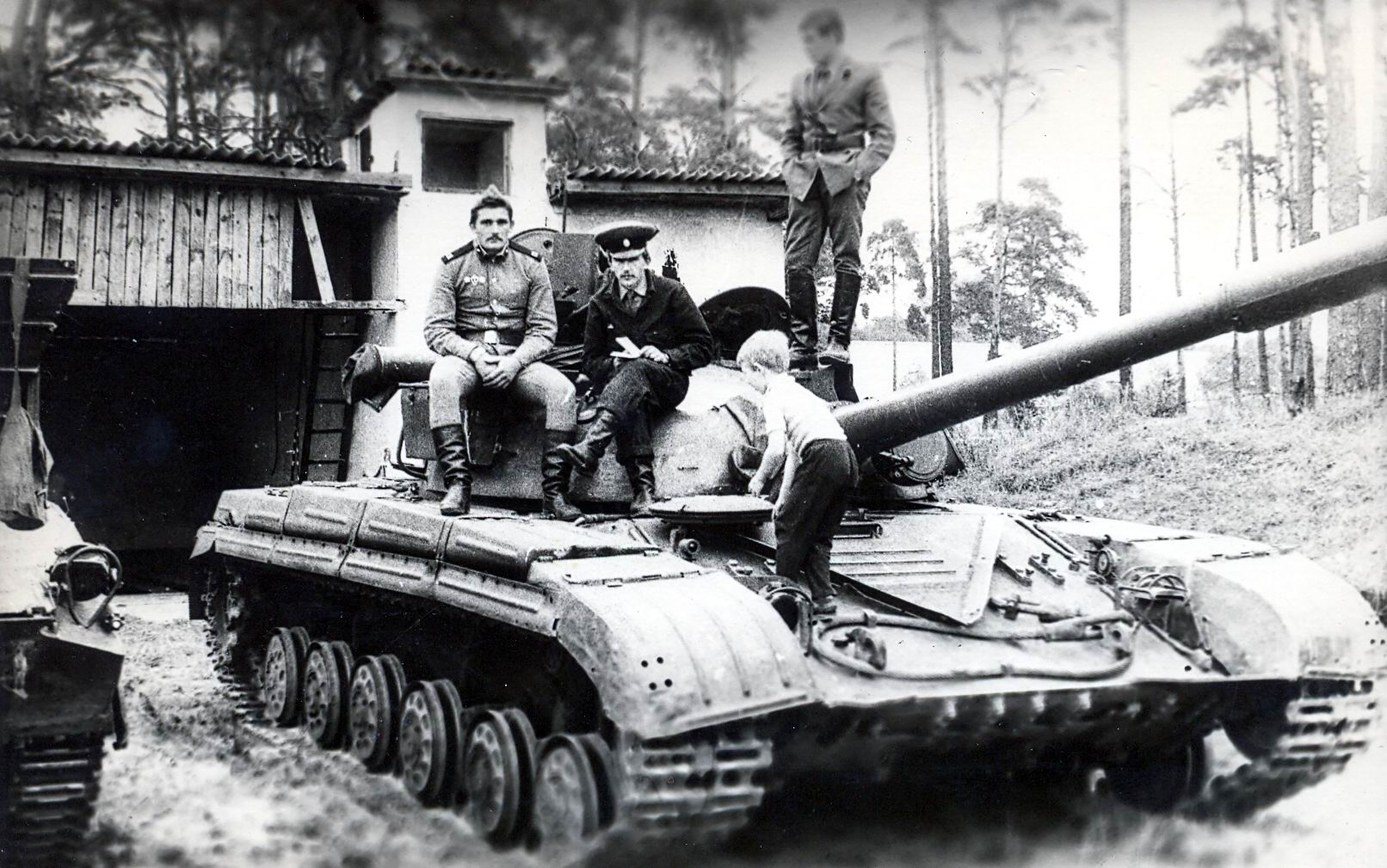
A Soviet T-64 of the 21st Motor Rifle Division in Perleberg, East Germany, in the 1980s

The T-64A began deployment to the Soviet Union's western military districts during the 1970s, and was gradually deployed to first line units in the Group of Soviet Forces in Germany in East Germany and Soviet troops in neighboring Warsaw Pact states. The first GSFG unit to receive the T-64A was the 14th Guards Motor Rifle Division at Jüterbog, which became the 32nd Guards Tank Division in 1982. When NATO detected the new tank after it was first deployed to East Germany, it was initially misidentified as the T-72. The T-64 mainly served with Soviet tank units in northern East Germany that were part of the 2nd Guards Tank Army, the 3rd Army, and the 20th Guards Army, although it began to be phased out and replaced by the newer T-80BV/T-80U before Soviet troops were withdrawn from Germany in the late 1980s and early 1990s. However, when the Soviet troops withdrew from Germany, two divisions and the 6th Separate Guards Motor Rifle Brigade still operated the T-64.

In September 1990, the Soviet Union had 3,982 T-64s in service west of the Urals, with 2,091 of these in Ukraine. 1,386 of these were T-64As, 220 T-64AKs, 1,192 T-64Bs, 159 T-64BVs, 420 T-64B1s, 27 T-64B1K/BV1K, and 578 T-64Rs. During the Soviet period, the T-64 was never exported.

It is normally reported that the T-64 was not used in the Soviet–Afghan War since the 40th Soviet Army that was deployed there used T-54/55 and T-62 tanks, possibly due to the limited usefulness of tanks in mountain warfare. A few T-64 tanks were tested in Afghanistan during January 1980, but were quickly withdrawn without seeing combat because their engines did not perform well in the high altitude necessary for Afghan operations.

=== Post-Soviet period ===
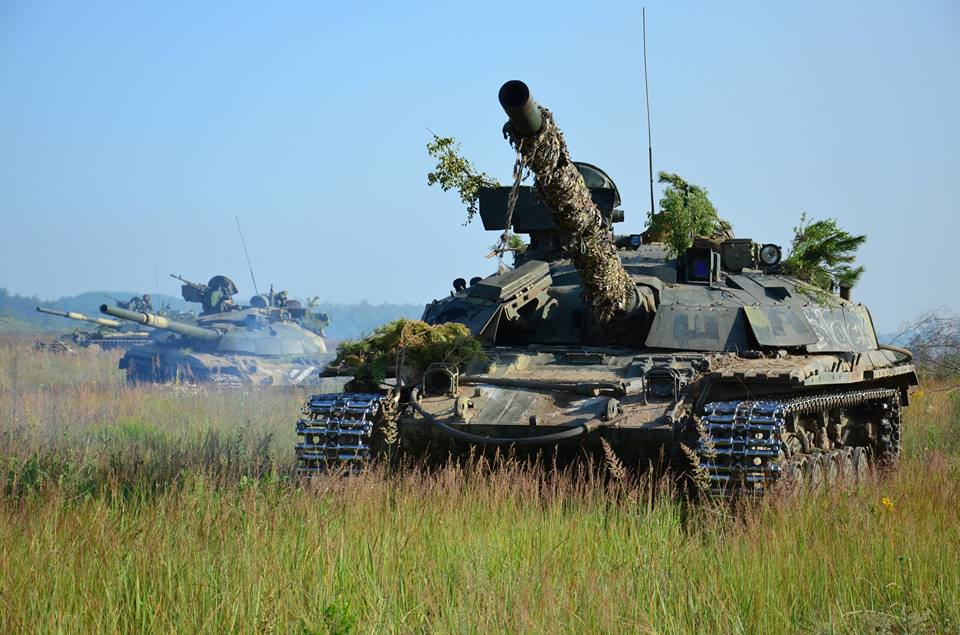
Ukrainian Army T-64BM during a training exercise

After the dissolution of the Soviet Union in 1991, the new Russian Ground Forces decided to standardise the tank fleet with the T-72 and the T-80, and the T-64s were gradually put in reserve storage or scrapped.

In June 1992, 18 former Soviet T-64BV tanks from the Odesa Military District's 59th Guards Motor Rifle Division were taken over by the Transnistrian Army, fighting in the Transnistria War. Two T-64s were disabled by Moldovan Ground Forces troops near Bender during Transnistrian counterattacks, one of which was knocked out by an MT-12 100mm anti-tank gun. These actions were the first combat use of the tank.

==== Ukraine ====
Ukraine deployed its T-64s during the initial outbreak of the war in Donbas. About 300 Ukrainian T-64s were reported lost to enemy action in 2014. At least 20 were abandoned during disorderly withdrawals and subsequently captured by pro-Russian separatists of the Donetsk People's Republic and Luhansk People's Republic. In June 2014, Russia began reactivating T-64s from its reserve stocks and donating them to the separatists as well. Donating surplus T-64s to the separatists was seen as cost-effective and deniable because the Russian military no longer had any use for the tanks and they could be passed off as individual examples captured from the Ukrainian Army. US intelligence officials noted that "Russia will claim these tanks were taken from Ukrainian forces...[but] we are confident that these tanks came from Russia." Separatist T-64s donated by Russia could be distinguished by their lack of Ukrainian markings and upgrades. By early 2022, the separatist armies collectively operated a little over 100 T-64s of various marks and configurations.

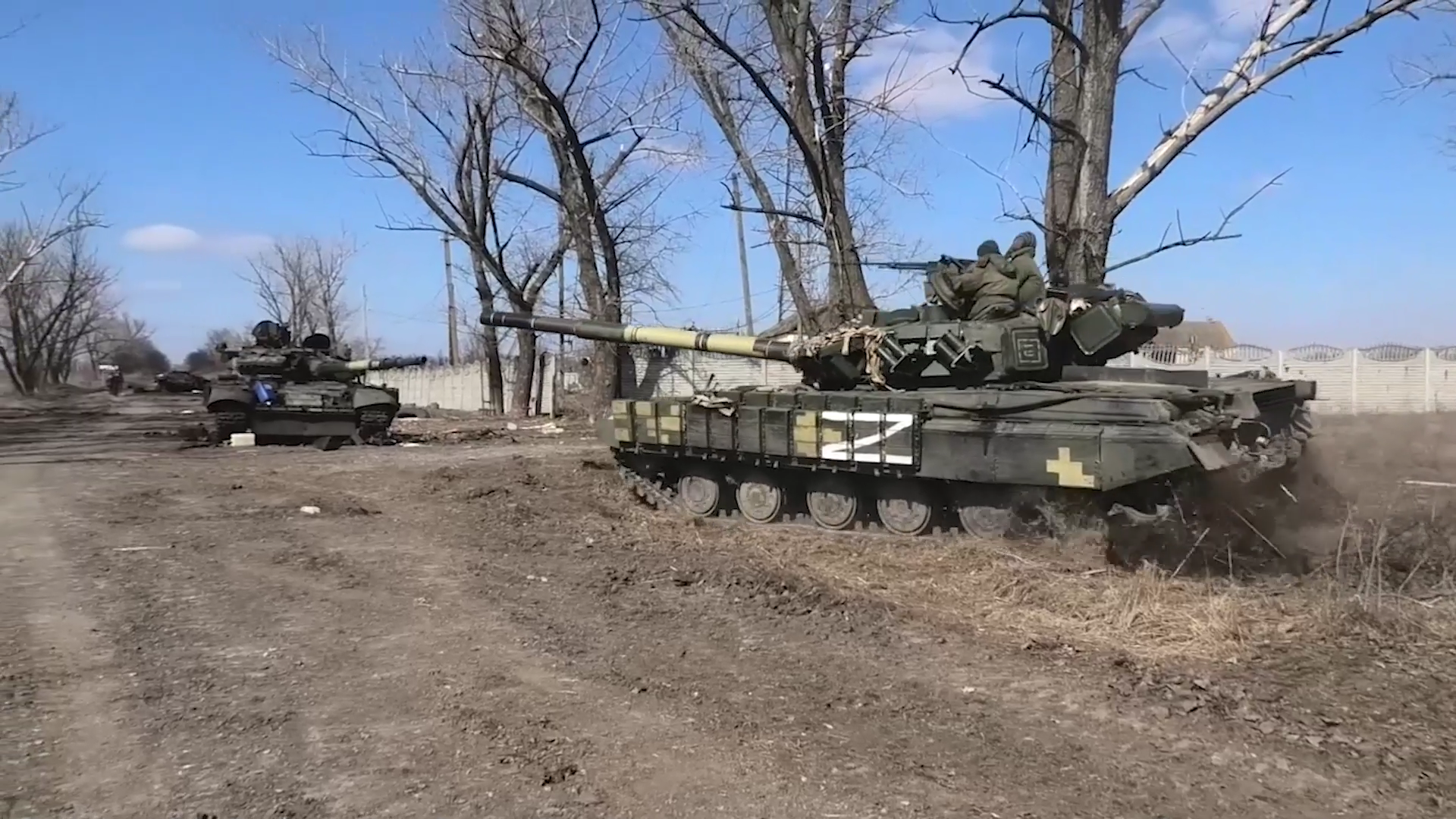
Captured Ukrainian T-64BV used by Luhansk People's Republic forces

There were around 40 T-64BVs stationed in Crimea in February 2014. Russia initially seized these tanks following its annexation of the peninsula, although they were returned to the Ukrainian government in June.

T-64s are used by both Ukraine and the pro-Russian separatists during the 2022 Russian invasion of Ukraine. Amidst the early phases of the invasion, Russian forces captured some Ukrainian T-64s, which they passed on to the separatists. By the end of 2022, the Ukrainian Army had lost 276 T-64s either captured or destroyed. Pro-Russian forces had also lost 50 T-64s in 2022. As of 18 February 2026, Ukraine has lost 686 T-64s of various variants, with Pro-Russian losses standing at 102.

The crews of T-64s have been called upon to act as artillery leading to shortages in 125 mm ammunition. Crews of the T-64 tanks rely on attack helicopters and drones; after firing at a target they move positions and fire again. If the Russian forces send infantry directly onto the battle field then the T-64 crews are required to directly support the infantry. On 21 December 2022 the Biden administration announced an aid package with an extra 100,000 rounds of 125 mm tank ammunition for the first time.

==== Other foreign service ====
Five T-64s were delivered to UNITA forces during the Angolan Civil War. The origin of these tanks is not clear, but some of them were also captured by MPLA forces. According to video evidence, at least one was destroyed in combat.

The Armed Forces of the Democratic Republic of the Congo received 25 T-64B1M from late 2016. They were seen in mid-2017 patrolling in Kasaï during the Kamwina Nsapu rebellion.

== Capabilities and limitations ==
A rather unconventional design, the T-64 had several features which set it apart not only from previous tanks, but from the visually similar T-72, many related to its higher mechanical complexity:

=== Firepower ===
- The T-64's hydraulic "Basket" autoloader places the projectiles horizontally at the bottom of the turret facing towards the centre, and the propellant charges vertically along the outer rim of the turret race, front-down. By contrast, the T-72's "Cazette" mechanism places the propellant charge on top of the corresponding projectile, also horizontally.
  - Being hydraulic, the Basket-type created a risk of hydraulic fluid fire if damaged in combat. The Cazette, by contrast, is electric.
  - Basket-type folds the projectile cradle upwards off the floor and vertically against the projectile cradle to which it is hinged, moving both pieces into the upper turret. Approaching the gun, the projectile cradle is moved forwards, unfolding both cradles and ammunition pieces to a straight line, ready for insertion. The Cazette's cradles are fixed, stacked propellant on top of projectile, and the two-cradle assembly must raise the propellant part above the gun to load the projectile first, then drawing back the mechanical pusher, lowering the propellant part, and inserting it with a second use of the pusher. This increases the time of loading of the T-72 by approximately one second. Total loading time is thus ~6-13s for T-64/80 against ~7–15 of T-72.
  - Because of greater diameter, Basket-type holds projectile and propellant parts for 6 additional shots over the Cazette of T-72 (28 vs 22).
  - Because of greater diameter of projectile cradle ring of the Basket-type, T-64 and later T-80 have a higher limit to the maximum length of armour-piercing fin-stabilized discarding sabot (APFSDS) projectiles, providing superior anti-armour performance relative to shorter projectiles used by T-72.
  - The automatic loader of T-64 is more reliable, and less sensitive to jolting when running off-road. It also has a "sequence" fire mode that feeds the gun with shells of the same type in less than five seconds. In the modern versions it is also able to turn backwards to keep a good speed at the end of the loading sequence
- The tank commander's cupola provides good vision, the antiaircraft machine gun can be operated from inside the turret; the commander can also control the main gun sight if necessary
- The turret was poorly configured to allow the crew to manually load the gun should the autoloader break. In such situations, rate of fire usually slowed to one round per minute as the gunner works around the broken machine to load the gun.
- Although two-piece ammunition allows for fast reloading of the gun in combat, replenishing the autoloader is slow.

=== Movement ===
- Because of a lower weight than T-72 (by ~3 tonnes), T-64 has slightly superior strategic and operational mobility (less wear and tear on tank transportation equipment, and lower fuel consumption per distance traveled).
- Driving seems much less exhausting for the crew, thanks to assisted controls and a more flexible suspension.
- The suspension system featured an entirely new and advanced design, and suffered various failures of unusually high frequency. Due to these problems, teams of civilian mechanics from the T-64 factories were "semi-permanent residents" of Soviet tank units early in the T-64's initial adoption phase.
- The 5TDF opposed-piston engine, while powerful and compact, was very finicky and prone to malfunctions and fires. Russian expert Viktor Murakhovsky, then a battalion commander in Group of Soviet Forces in Germany reflected that in his unit the rate of the engines requiring a major overhaul was close to one per tank in a year. He also noted the difficulty of starting this engine, especially in the damp German winters, and that starting aids used by soldiers, like the high-pressure air and/or oil injection, often caused engine fires.

=== Protection ===
- Basket-type autoloader stores, as stated previously, propellant charges vertically, the rear ends almost the same height as the roof of the hull. Combined with greater diameter of the complete autoloader assembly, the overall greater size of this type compared to the cazette significantly increases chance of ammunition being ignited by direct hit of any weapon penetrating into the crew compartment. The problem is largely irrelevant if a full ammunition load outside autoloader is carried, but T-72 carrying only autoloader ammunition is far more survivable than a T-64 in a similar situation thanks to the compact dimensions of Cazette-type ammunition storage.
- Small and lightly constructed roadwheels of T-64 have been found to be less resistant to antitank mines than the larger roadwheels of T-72 and previous Soviet medium tanks.
- Because of the small-diameter roadwheels and vertical placement of propellant charges in the autoloader, charges are dangerously exposed against hits penetrating the 85mm hull side armour, and are located at such height that they are too high to be protected by the roadwheels, yet too low to be fully protected by the sideskirt armour panels.
- While many previous tanks used 4 or 5-man crews, T-64 and T-72 have crews of three men. This allows the fourth man to remain in relative safety away from combat and perform other duties until the tank returns for maintenance and resupply. Potentially, he and other would-be loaders can be reassigned to vehicle maintenance and resupply duty to assist the crews of other returning tanks, improving the quality of maintenance as the crew inside the tanks will likely be exhausted after several hours of operation.
- Because of smaller physical characteristics thanks to the 3-men +autoloader design, T-64 and T-72 have a lower theoretical logistical footprint than tanks of equal number using a human loader. This decreases the chance of the logistics chain being detected and attacked, and decreases potential losses.
- Counter to the benefit of leaving the fourth crew man in favour of using an automatic loader, this also creates difficulties in immediately replacing an injured crewman while in combat. In comparison with 4-man tanks, there exists a possibility of an injured crewman being dragged from his seat and into the loader's space for immediate treatment of injury while the tank retreats. In more cramped 3-man designs such empty space is not immediately available and moving between the turret and hull may be more difficult in the first place. There is also an argument that a fourth crewman can replace any other of the three in case of injury, however, this possibility can also exist in 3-man designs if redundancy of weapon controls allows for temporary 1-man operation of turret.
- Because of weight limitations of the powertrain, T-64 had lower overall capacity for improvements which add weight to the tank. Because improvements of armour tend to have a greater cost in weight than, say, replacement of gun optics and turret/gun laying drives with more precise versions, this means T-64 suffers greater limitations in terms of protection improvement than the heavier T-72, which was designed with a more durable powertrain from the start.

=== Concerns of 3-man and 4-man crew maintenance ===
While having smaller tank crews (three vs. the usual four) is advantageous since more tanks can theoretically be fielded using the same number of soldiers, there are also serious downsides. Tanks require frequent maintenance and refueling, and much of this is physically demanding work that several people must work together to accomplish. Most of the time, these duties are also performed at the end of a long day of operations, when everyone in the tank is exhausted. Having one less crewman for these tasks increases the strain on the remaining three men and increases the frequency of botched or skipped maintenance. This problem worsens if the tank's commander is also an officer who must often perform other duties such as higher-level meetings, leaving only two men to attend to the tank. All of this means that tanks with three-man crews are more likely to suffer from performance-degrading human exhaustion, and mechanical failures that take longer to fix and that keep the tank from reaching the battlefield. These problems are exacerbated during prolonged time periods of operations.

== Operators ==
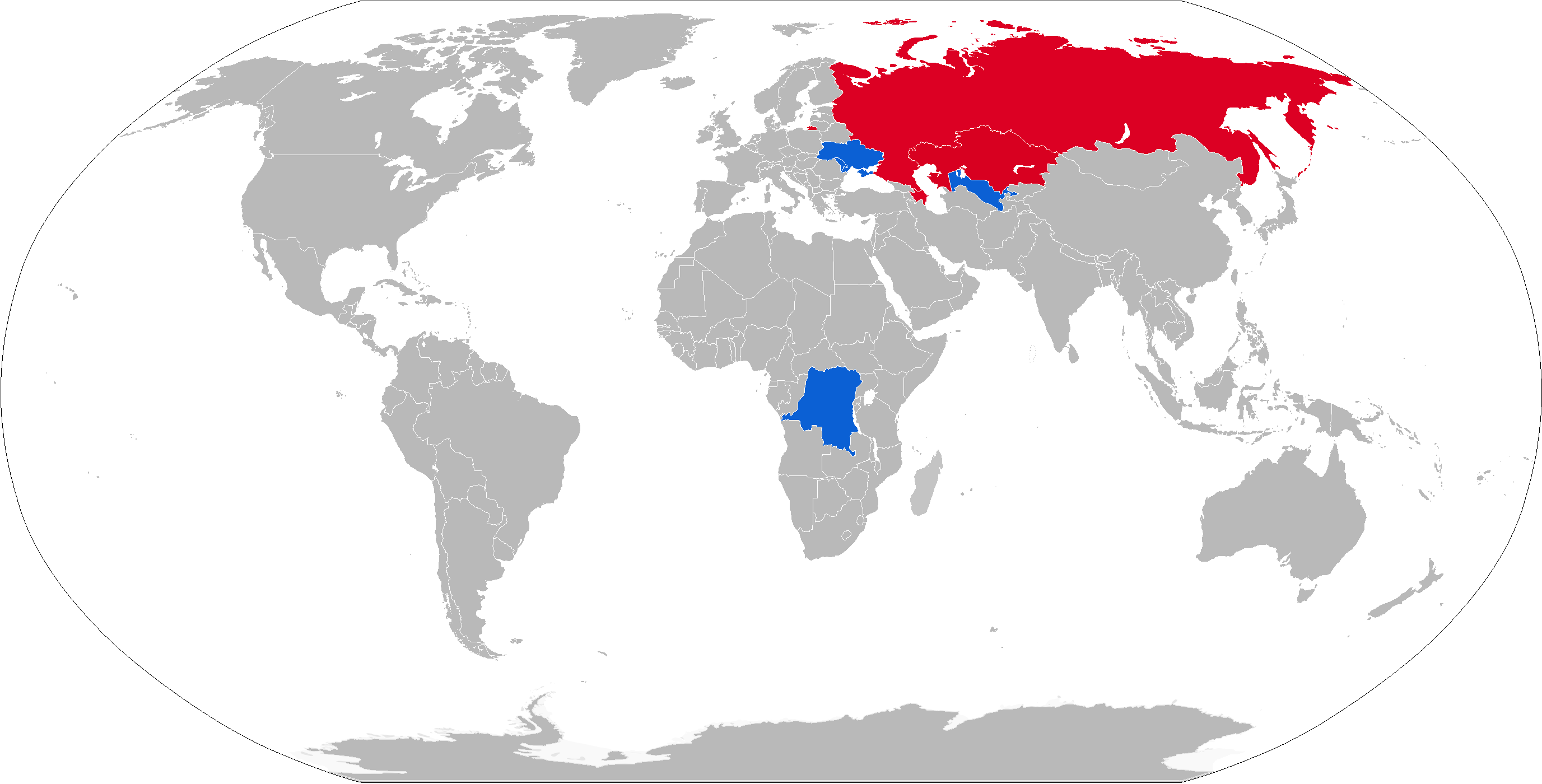
Operators: Current Former

=== Current operators ===
- Democratic Republic of the Congo – 25 to 50 T-64B1M tanks received from Ukraine in 2016.
- Transnistria – 18 T-64BVs are in service.
- Russia – 50 T-64A/BVs in active service, 449 T-64s in store. Approximately 4,000 were inherited from the Soviet Union. In 2014, Russia had approximately 2,000 which it had phased out of service and believed to be slated for destruction, according to NATO and the United States Department of State. T-64As and T-64BVs, including Zr. 2017 variants, have been used by pro-Russian forces in the invasion of Ukraine.
- Ukraine – 2,345 were in service as of 1995, 2,250 as of 2000, 2,215 as of 2005, 1,667 as of 2010, 700 T-64BV and T-64BM Bulat in service and 650 T-64 in storage as of 2015. By August 2019, Ukraine's Kharkiv Armoured-Vehicle Factory (KhBTZ) had upgraded over 150 T-64BV to the new Model 2017 standard, and the Lviv Armoured -Vehicle Factory (LBTZ) had started delivering this model as well. In 2020, Ukraine had over 720 T-64BV 2017, T-64BM Bulat and T-64BV in service, and 578 T-64 in storage. During the 2022 invasion of Ukraine, some older T-64As and T-64Bs have also been spotted.
  - Donetsk People's Republic – multiple T-64Bs, T-64BVs and T-64BMs in service as of 2017.
  - Luhansk People's Republic – multiple T-64Bs, T-64BVs and T-64BMs in service as of 2017.
- Uzbekistan – 100 in service as of 2017.

=== Former operators ===
- UNITA − 5 used in the Angolan Civil War; the provenance of these tanks is unclear.
- Soviet Union – passed on to successor states.
  - Belarus – 299 in 1994. All have been scrapped since.
  - Kazakhstan – approximately 50 in 2011. All have been scrapped since.

== Specifications (T-64BV) ==
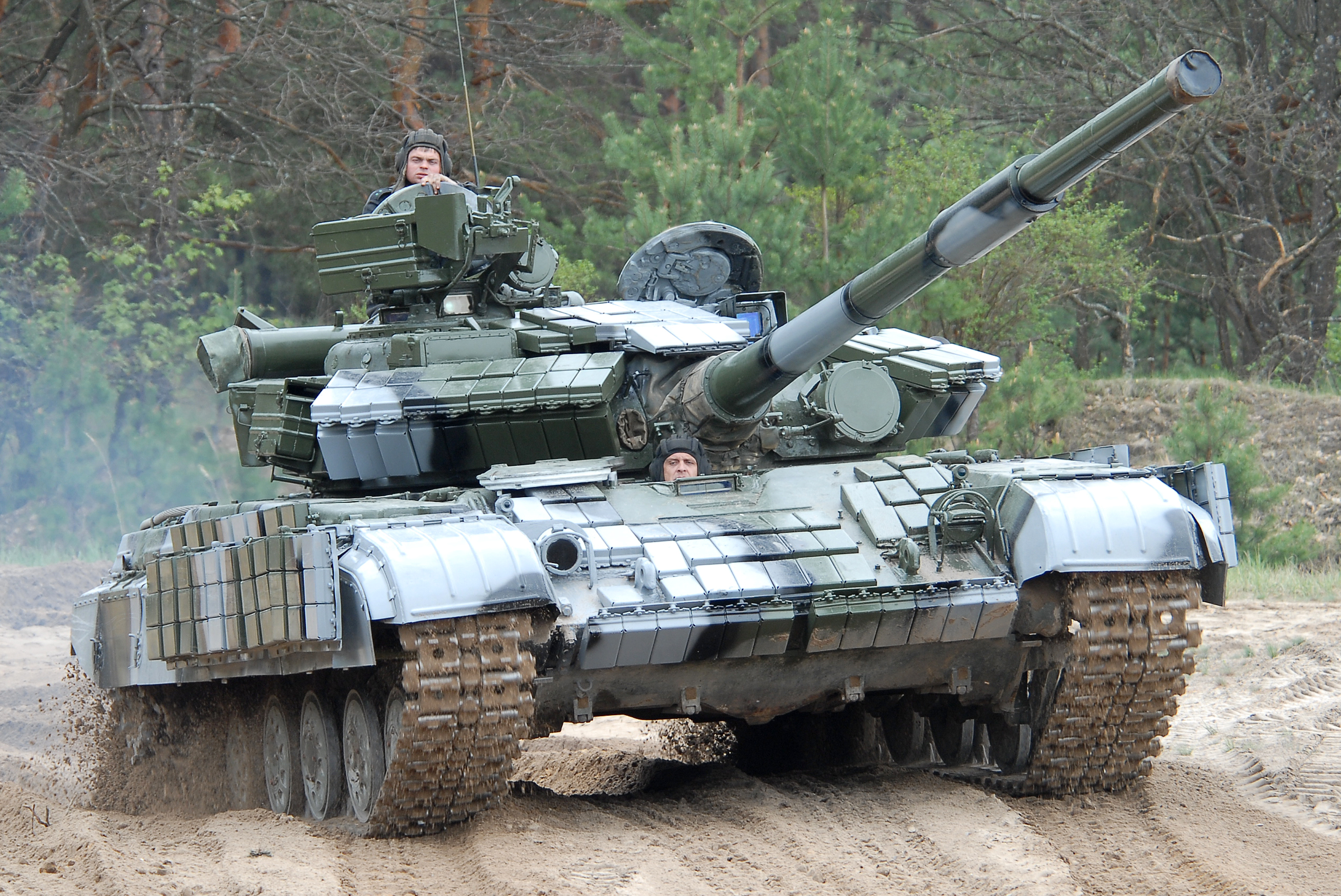
T-64BV

=== Dimensions ===
- Length (gun to the front): 9.225 m
- Length (without the gun): 6.54 m
- Breadth: 3.6 m
- Height: 2.17 m
- Weight: 42.5 t

=== Crew ===
Three men:

- commander
- driver
- gunner

=== Propulsion ===
- Engine: 5TDF multifuel (diesel, kerosene and petrol) with 5 opposed cylinders, 10 piston, 13.6 L. Developing 700 hp (515 kW) at 2,800 rpm, consumption of 170 to 200 litres per 100 km.
- Transmission: two lateral gearboxes with seven forward and one backward gear.
- Three internal tanks for a 740 litres fuel capacity, two on the mudguards with 140 litres and two droppable 200 litres tanks on the aft end of the chassis.

=== Performance ===
- Max. road speed: 60.5 km/h.
- Max off-road speed: 35 km/h.
- Power-to-weight ratio: 16.2 hp/t (11.9 kW/t).
- Range: 500 km, 700 km with additional tanks.
- Ground pressure: 0.9 kgf/cm^{2} (88 kPa, 12.8 psi).
- Able to ford in 1.8 m of water without preparation and 5 m with snorkels.
- Crosses a 2.8 m wide trench.
- Crosses a 0.8 m high obstacle.
- Max. slope 30°.

=== Armament ===
- 125 mm smoothbore 2A46M-1 gun (D-81TM) with carousel 6ETs40 loader, 28 shots, fire rate 8 shots per minute, 36 embedded shots (8 x 9M112M "Kobra" (NATO code "AT-8 Songster"), 28 shells). Available shells are all fin-stabilised:
  - anti-personnel (APERS) version of the 3UOF-36, 3OVF-22, with several perforating abilities.
  - armour-piercing shells (APFSDS) 3UBM-17 or 3UBM-19 or older ones with a supplementary charge giving them an initial speed of about 1800 m/s.
  - hollow charge shells, 3VUK-25 or 3UBK-21.
- coaxial machine gun 7.62 mm PKT with 1,250 rounds.
- remote-controlled air-defence machine gun 12.7 mm NSVT "Utyos" with 300 rounds.
- 4+4 (T-64B) or 6+6 (T-64A) 81 mm smoke mortars 902B "Tucha-2".

=== Equipment ===
- The 1A33 fire control system, with:
  - Radio control of the 9K112 "Kobra" missiles (NATO code "AT-8 Songster") launched from the gun.
  - The 2E28M hydraulic stabiliser (vertical range −5°20' to +15°15')
  - The gunner day sight 1G42 with embedded laser telemeter.
  - The TPN-1-49-23 active IR night sight.
  - The L2G IR projector left of the gun for illumination.
  - The 1V517 ballistic calculator.
  - The 1B11 anemometric gauge.
- The tank commander's cupola is equipped with:
  - The PKN-4S combined day and night sight which allows a 360° vision and to fire the main weapons.
  - The PZU-6 AA sight.
  - The 2Z20 2-axis electrical stabiliser (vertical range −3° to +70°).
- The TPN-3-49 or TPN-4 and TVN-4 night vision for the driver.
- An R-173M radio.
- A CBRN protection, with radiation detectors and global compartment overpressure.
- Two snorkels for crossing rivers with a depth up to 5 m.
- A KMT-6 mine clearing plough can be fitted at the front.

=== Protection ===
- 3-layer composite armour (K formula), with a thickness between 450 and 20 mm:
  - Front: 120 mm steel, 105 mm glass fibre, 40 mm steel.
  - Sides: 80 mm steel.
  - Front of the turret: 150 mm steel, 150 mm glass fibre, 40 mm steel
- Lateral rubber skirts protecting the top of the suspension.
- Kontakt-1 reactive bricks covering:
  - The front and the side of the turret
  - The glacis
  - The lateral skirts

== See also ==
- List of tanks
- List of Soviet tanks
- T-72 – (Soviet Union)
- T-80 – (Soviet Union)
- T-84 – (Ukraine)
- T-90 – (Soviet Union, Russia)
- T-95 – (Russia)
- 125 mm smoothbore ammunition

== Sources ==
- Foss, Christopher F. (2011). Jane's Armour and Artillery 2011–2012 (32nd ed.). Coulsdon, UK: IHS Jane's. ISBN 978-0-7106-2960-9.
- Perrett, Bryan (1987). Soviet Armour Since 1945. London: Blandford Press. ISBN 0-7137-1735-1.
- Saenko, M., V. Chobitok (2002). Osnovnoj boevoj tank T-64, Moscow: Eksprint. ISBN 5-94038-022-0.
- Sewell, Stephen "Cookie" (July–August 1998). "Why Three Tanks?" (PDF). Armor. CVII (4). Fort Knox, KY: US Army Armor Center. ISSN 0004-2420. PB-17-98-4. Archived from the original (PDF) on 4 March 2016.
- Zaloga, Steven (1992), T-64 and T-80, Hong Kong: Concord, ISBN 962-361-031-9.
- Zaloga, Steven (2015). T-64 Battle Tank: The Cold War's Most Secret Tank. Oxford: Osprey Publishing. ISBN 9781472806307.
- "Russian expert says about Ukrainian T-64 tank superiority over T-72B3". unian.info. 15 February 2019.
