= Contact =

Contact may refer to:

== Interaction ==
=== Physical interaction ===
- Contact (geology), a common geological feature
- Contact lens or contact, a lens placed on the eye
- Contact sport, a sport in which players make contact with other players or objects
- Contact juggling
- Contact mechanics, the study of solid objects that deform when touching each other
- Contact process (mathematics), a model of an interacting particle system
- Electrical contacts
- Sparśa, a concept in Buddhism that in Sanskrit/Indian language is translated as "contact", "touching", "sensation", "sense impression", etc.

=== Social interaction ===
- Contact (amateur radio)
- Contact (law), a concept related to visitation rights
- Contact (social), a person who can offer help in achieving goals
- Contact Conference, an annual scientific conference
- Extraterrestrial contact; see Search for extraterrestrial intelligence
- First contact (anthropology), an initial meeting of two cultures
- Language contact, the interaction of two or more languages

== Arts, entertainment, and media ==
=== Films ===
- The Contact (1963 film), educational film starring John Hurt
- Contact (1978 film), a Soviet animated short film
- Contact (1992 film), a short film by Jonathan Darby, with Brad Pitt
- Contact (1997 American film), a science fiction drama film adapted from the Carl Sagan novel
- The Contact (1997 South Korean film), (접속 Jeopsok, "connection"), a romance film
- Contact, a 2002 short film by Kieran Galvin
- Contact (2009 film), an Australian documentary film

=== Games ===
- Contact (tile game)
- Contact (video game), a 2006 role-playing video game
- Contact, a social word-guessing game similar to Botticelli

=== Music ===
==== Albums ====
- Contact (ATB album)
- Contact (Boney James album)
- Contact (Fancy album)
- Contact (Fantastic Plastic Machine album)
- Contact (Freda Payne album)
- Contact (Indo G album)
- Contact (Mad Heads album)
- Contact (Minori Chihara album)
- Contact (Noisettes album)
- Contact (Platinum Blonde album)
- Contact (Pointer Sisters album)
- Contact (Silver Apples album)
- Contact (Thirteen Senses album)
- Contact, an album by The Benjamin Gate
- Contact! (Eiffel 65 album), 2001
- Contact! (Ray Barretto album), 1998

==== Songs ====
- "Contact" (Daft Punk song) (2013)
- "Contact" (Edwin Starr song) (1978)
- "Contact", a song by Anthrax from We've Come for You All
- "Contact", a song by Big Audio Dynamite from Megatop Phoenix
- "Contact", a song by Brigitte Bardot
- "Contact", a song by Brooklyn Bounce
- "Contact", a song by Kyo from 300 Lésions
- "Contact", a song by Glenn Morrison
- "Contact", a song by Phish from Junta
- "Contact", a song by The Police from Reggatta de Blanc
- "Contact", a song by Spirit from Rapture in the Chambers
- "Contact", a song from the musical Rent

=== Television ===
- "Contact", a 1985 television play in the BBC2 Screen Two series directed by Alan Clarke
- "Contact", a 1995 episode of Lois & Clark: The New Adventures of Superman
- "Contact" (Saving Hope), a 2012 episode of Saving Hope
- "Contact" (Halo), the series premiere of Halo

=== Literature ===
- Contact (literary magazine), an American literary "little magazine"
  - Contact/II, a 1976 American literary magazine, named in a tribute to Contact
- Contact (novel), by Carl Sagan
- The Contact, a 1985 novel by Garikai Mutasa

=== Other uses in arts, entertainment, and media ===
- Contact (musical), a 1999 dance play
- Contact (The Culture), a fictional organization in the works of Iain M. Banks

== Brands and enterprises ==
- Contact (computer dating), a computer dating company
- Contact Air, an airline
- Contact Energy, an energy company
- Contact Theatre, a multi-disciplinary arts venue in Manchester, England

== Other uses ==
- Contact (mathematics), an equivalence relation
- Contact paper or contact, a self-adhesive, PVC or paper film, used for covering or lining
- Contact print, a kind of photographic image
- Contact process, a method of producing sulfuric acid
- Contact, Nevada, US, an unincorporated community
- Contacts (Apple), address book software included with several Apple operating systems
- Google Contacts, a contact management service developed by Google
- Transit (astronomy)#Contacts, specific points in time during a transit or eclipse

== See also ==
- 3-2-1 Contact, an American science educational television show
- Contac, a medication brand
- Contactor, an electrically controlled switch used for switching a power circuit
- Touch (disambiguation)
- Kontakt (disambiguation)
- Kontact
- Contakt
