= Kontakt =

Kontakt may refer to:

- Kontakt (film), a 2005 Macedonian film directed by Sergej Stanojkovski
- Kontakt (magazine), a Norwegian political magazine (1947–1954)
- Kontakt (software), a music sampler
- Kontakt-series explosive reactive armour
  - Kontakt-1
  - Kontakt-5

== See also ==
- Contact (disambiguation)
- Kontakte (1958–60), electronic music by Karlheinz Stockhausen
- Contakt
- Kontact
