= San Jacinto, Nevada =

- Ghost town
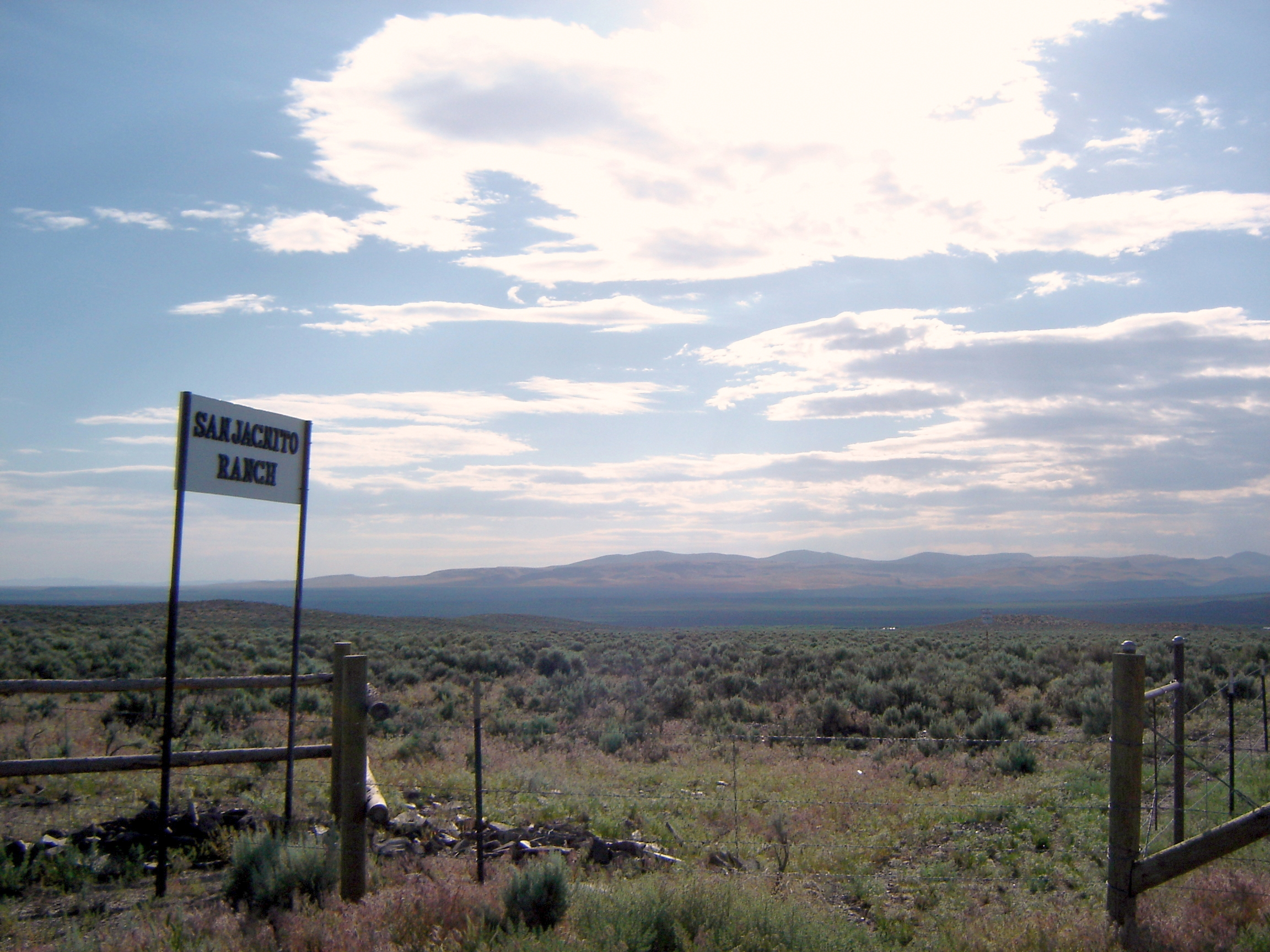
- San Jacinto Ranch, 2009

- Location of San Jacinto San; Jacinto (the United States)
- Coordinates: 41°52′07″N 114°40′35″W
- Country: United States
- State: Nevada
- County: Elko
- Elevation: 5,200 ft (1,585 m)
- Time zone: UTC-8 (Pacific (PST))
  - Summer (DST): UTC-7 (PDT)
- ZIP code: 89825
- Area code: 775
- GNIS feature ID: 845648

San Jacinto is a ghost town in along Salmon Falls Creek in northern Elko County, Nevada, United States. It is part of the Elko Micropolitan Statistical Area.

== History ==
It was the site of a railroad station located eight miles northeast of Contact, Nevada on the Union Pacific railroad.

It is named after the San Jacinto Ranch, which in turn is named for the Battle of San Jacinto, fought at present-day Houston, Texas in 1836.

The San Jacinto post office was in operation from November 1898 through April 1938.

The lowest temperature ever recorded in Nevada, −50 °F (−46 °C) was recorded in San Jacinto on January 8, 1937.

The population was 25 in 1940.

The site of the former community is east of U.S. Route 93.

== Climate ==
Climate data for San Jacinto, Nevada
Month	Jan	Feb	Mar	Apr	May	Jun	Jul	Aug	Sep	Oct	Nov	Dec	Year
Record high °F (°C)	65 (18)	68 (20)	74 (23)	85 (29)	92 (33)	100 (38)	104 (40)	108 (42)	95 (35)	90 (32)	78 (26)	68 (20)	108 (42)
Mean daily maximum °F (°C)	36.5 (2.5)	41.3 (5.2)	49.7 (9.8)	58.6 (14.8)	66.6 (19.2)	76.2 (24.6)	87.4 (30.8)	84.9 (29.4)	76.0 (24.4)	62.8 (17.1)	49.5 (9.7)	40.2 (4.6)	60.8 (16.0)
Mean daily minimum °F (°C)	11.4 (−11.4)	16.8 (−8.4)	22.7 (−5.2)	28.7 (−1.8)	34.4 (1.3)	39.8 (4.3)	45.4 (7.4)	41.3 (5.2)	33.3 (0.7)	25.9 (−3.4)	18.3 (−7.6)	13.6 (−10.2)	27.6 (−2.4)
Record low °F (°C)	−50 (−46)	−34 (−37)	−16 (−27)	−3 (−19)	11 (−12)	19 (−7)	30 (−1)	21 (−6)	10 (−12)	0 (−18)	−22 (−30)	−45 (−43)	−50 (−46)
Average precipitation inches (mm)	0.66 (17)	0.47 (12)	0.59 (15)	0.93 (24)	1.29 (33)	1.16 (29)	0.51 (13)	0.48 (12)	0.47 (12)	0.60 (15)	0.62 (16)	0.56 (14)	8.34 (212)
Average snowfall inches (cm)	7.1 (18)	4.5 (11)	3.7 (9.4)	2.8 (7.1)	1.3 (3.3)	0.2 (0.51)	0.0 (0.0)	0.0 (0.0)	0.3 (0.76)	0.7 (1.8)	3.1 (7.9)	5.3 (13)	28.9 (73)
Source: WRCC
