= T-80 models =

Overview of T-80 main battle tank models

List of models and variants of the T-80 main battle tank.

Command tanks with additional radio equipment have K added to their designation for komandirskiy ("command"), for example, T-80BK is the command version of the T-80B. Versions with reactive armour have V added, for vzryvnoy ("explosive"), for example T-80BV. Less-expensive versions without missile capability have a figure 1 added, as T-80B1.

== List of models ==
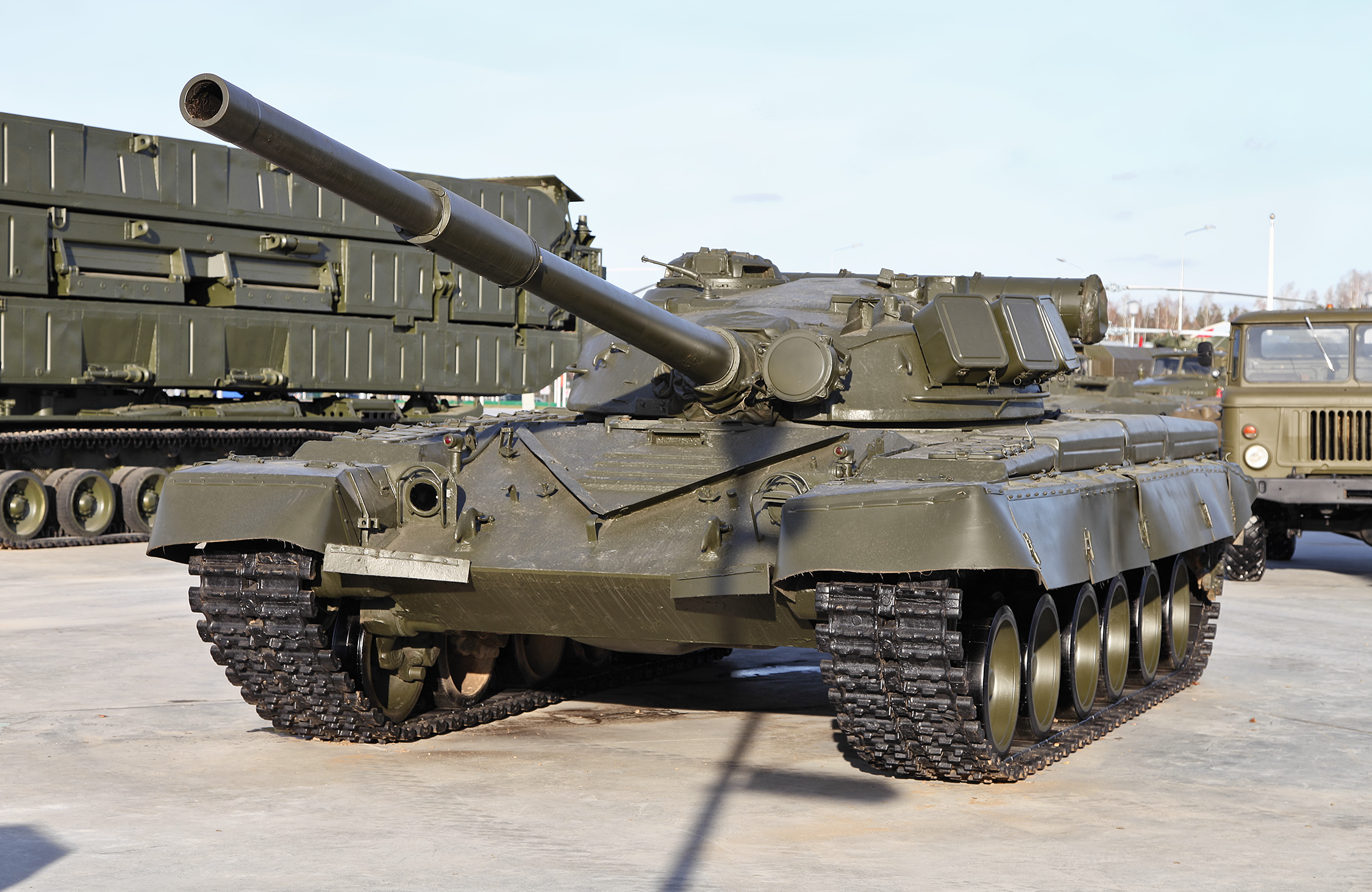
Object 219 prototype

=== Ob'yekt 219 SP1 ===
The prototype designed by Nikolay Popov was constructed in 1969 by Leningrad Kirov Plant (LKZ) and designated Object 219 SP1. It was essentially the T-64T powered by a GTD-1000T multi-fuel gas turbine engine producing up to 1,000 hp (746 kW). During the trials, it became blatant that the increased weight and dynamic characteristics required a complete redesign of the vehicle's overall suspension.

=== Ob'yekt 219 SP2 ===
The second prototype, designated Object 219 SP2, received bigger drive sprockets and return rollers. The number of road wheels was increased from 5 to 6. The construction of the turret was altered to use the same compartment, 125 mm 2A46 tank gun, autoloader and placement of ammunition as the T-64A. Some additional equipment was borrowed from the T-64A. The LKZ plant built a series of prototypes based on Object 219 SP2. In 1976 it officially became the T-80.

=== T-80 (Ob'yekt 219) (1976) ===
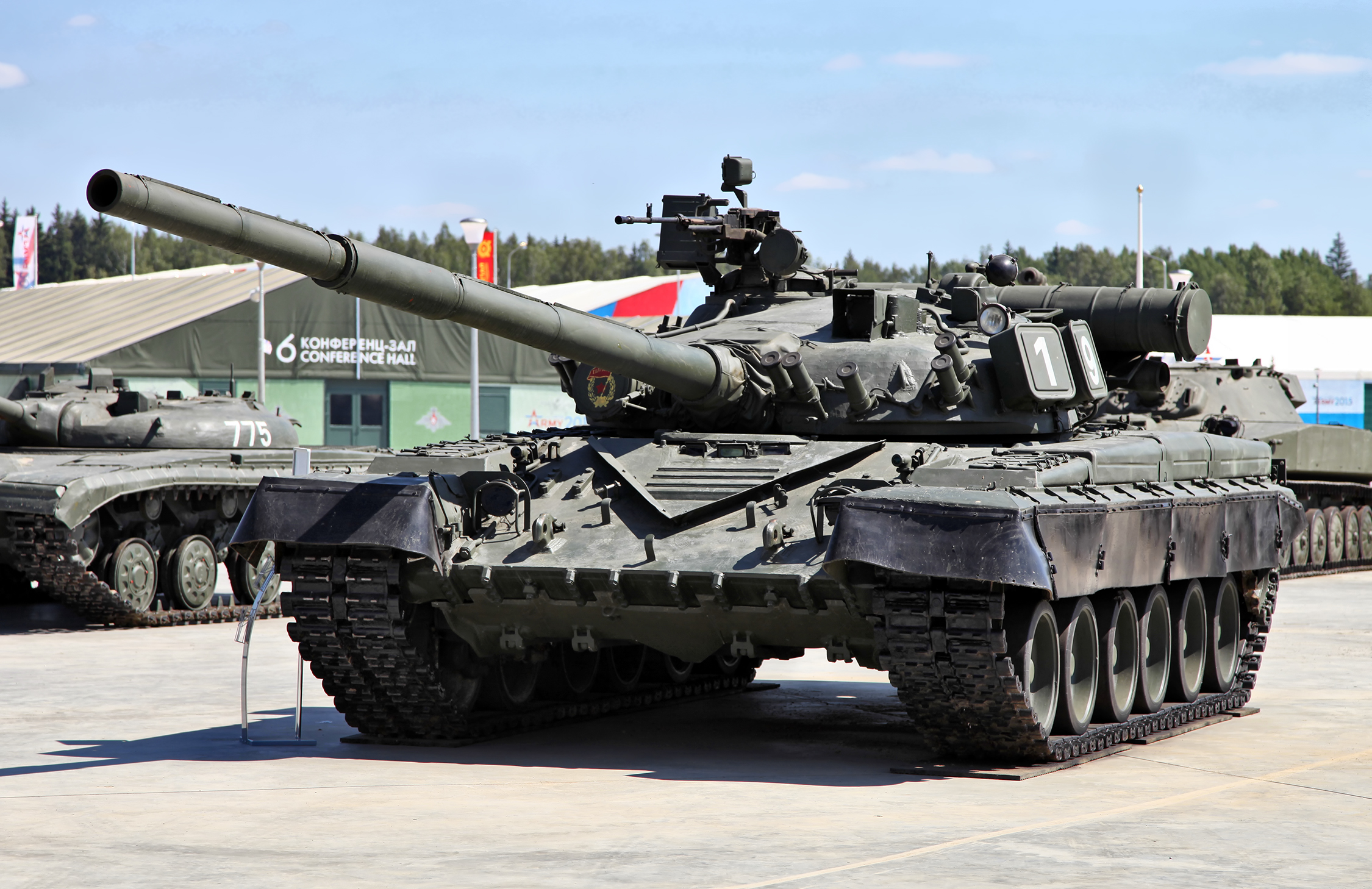
Early T-80B (Object 219R) at Patriot Park

First production model. The T-80 has some features of both the T-64 and T-72, and other features unique to itself. In general, the offensive capabilities of the T-80 are similar to the T-64A, but it is faster thanks to the GTD-1000T 1,000 hp (746 kW) multi-fuel gas turbine engine. Visual keys are large, die-cast, irregularly spaced, ribbed, rubber-tired road wheels with three support rollers, a self-entrenching blade on the lower glacis, a Luna searchlight in the same position as the T-64. Significant differences are a coincidence rangefinder, and probable enhanced armor on the glacis (an upper glacis of steel layers enclosing fiberglass layers and a cast steel turret enclosing nonmetallic materials). Unlike the later models, the early T-80 had V-shaped splash plate on glacis plate. Due to its armour being obsolete, only a couple hundred were built between 1976 and 1978 before the production halted and switched to the T-80B. Some T-80s were later upgraded to B level.

- T-80M-1 – T-80 with an Arena countermeasures array fitted to rear of the turret's roof. It also has an armour belt around turret.

=== T-80B (Ob'yekt 219R) (1978) ===
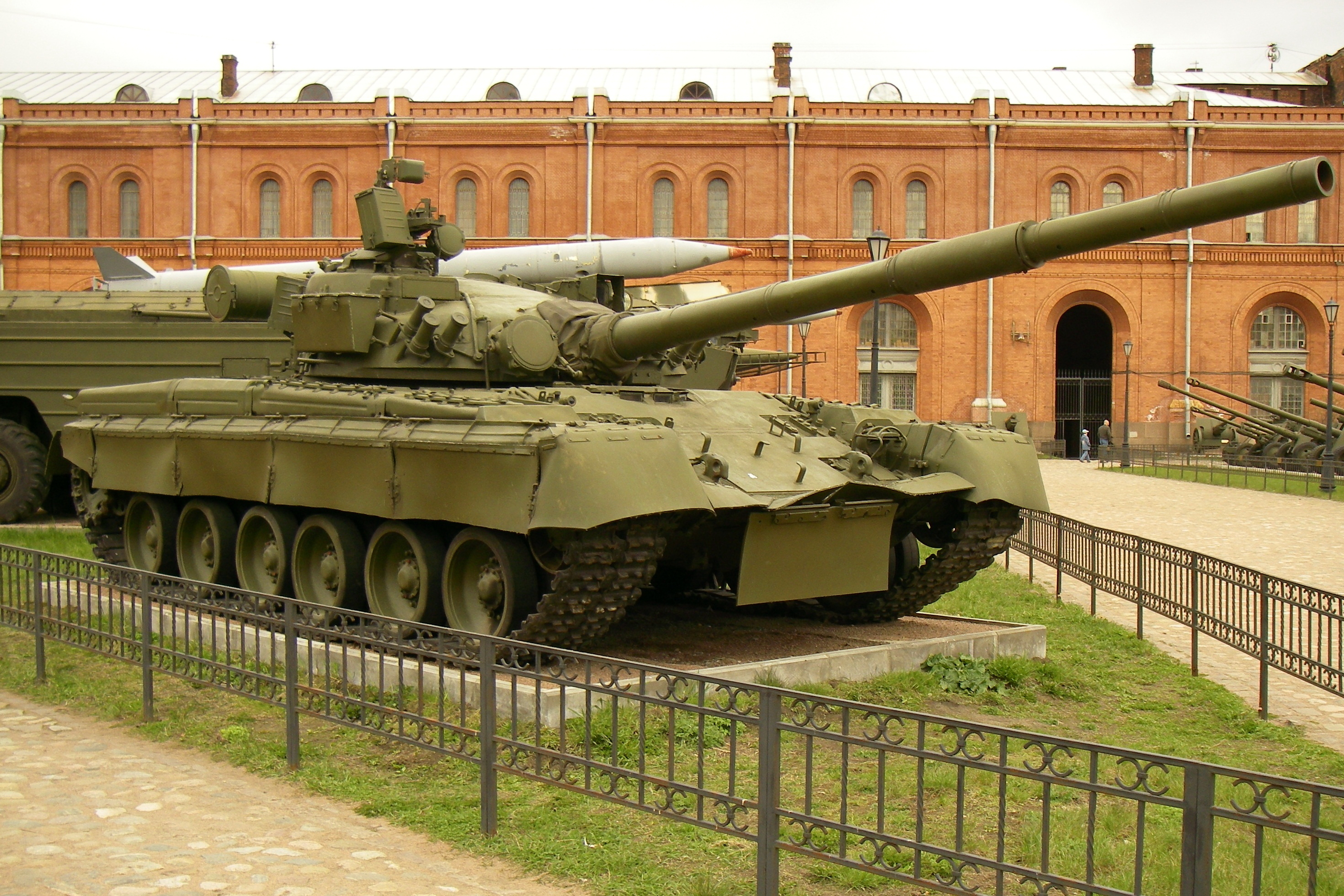
T-80B

This first major redesign features a modified turret with new composite K ceramic armor providing better protection against APFSDS kinetic energy penetrators at the front of the hull and turret. The protection level of the turret increased from 410 mm of steel to 500 mm of steel. It also includes 1A33 fire control system, 9K112-2 system which allows firing 9M112 "Kobra" (NATO code: AT-8 Songster) ATGM using the tank's barrel. The missile control box is mounted in front of the cupola and has angled support. The ATGM may be launched while moving slowly and can be auto-loaded with the two-halves mated during ramming but the stub charge is manually loaded. Unlike T-80, T-80B does not have a splash plate on glacis plate. Retained the 2A46-2 main gun from the basic T-80 model.

- T-80B obr.1980g. – T-80B with a new 1,100 hp (820 kW) GTD-1000TF gas turbine engine.
- T-80BK (Ob'yekt 660) – T-80B command tank equipped with additional R-130 radio, TNA navigation set, a 2nd whip antenna and a telescopic mast. It does not have the 9K112-2 system.

=== T-80A (Ob'yekt 219A) (1982) ===
A further development of T-80B. It was developed in late 1970s and first model was produced in 1982. It was an attempt to provide the T-80B tank with improved armour and firepower. It uses 1,200 hp (895 kW) GTD-1000M gas turbine engine. It has the 9K119 system which allows it to fire 9M119M Invar (AT-11B Sniper) ATGM using the tank's barrel. It also had several pintle mounts for the NSVT heavy machine gun and other improvements. The ammo load for 125 mm smoothbore tank gun was increased considerably when comparing it to the one of T-80B (T-80B – 38 rounds, T-80A – 45 rounds). It has some features of the future T-80U including the new turret with stronger armour and equipped with a new fire control system with the 1G46 gunner's sight. However, because of all those improvements T-80A is 2.8 tonnes heavier than the T-80B. It never left the prototype stage and was further developed as T-80U.

- T-80A obr.1984 – T-80A with Kontakt-1 explosive reactive armour. The model with Kontakt-1 is sometimes called T-80AV. The main external difference from the T-80BV is the lack of Kobra missile guidance box in front of the commanders cupola.
- T-80AK – Command variant of T-80A.
- T-80AK obr.1984 – T-80A with Kontakt-1 explosive reactive armour. The model with Kontakt-1 is sometimes called T-80AKV.

=== T-80BV (Ob'yekt 219RV) (1985) ===
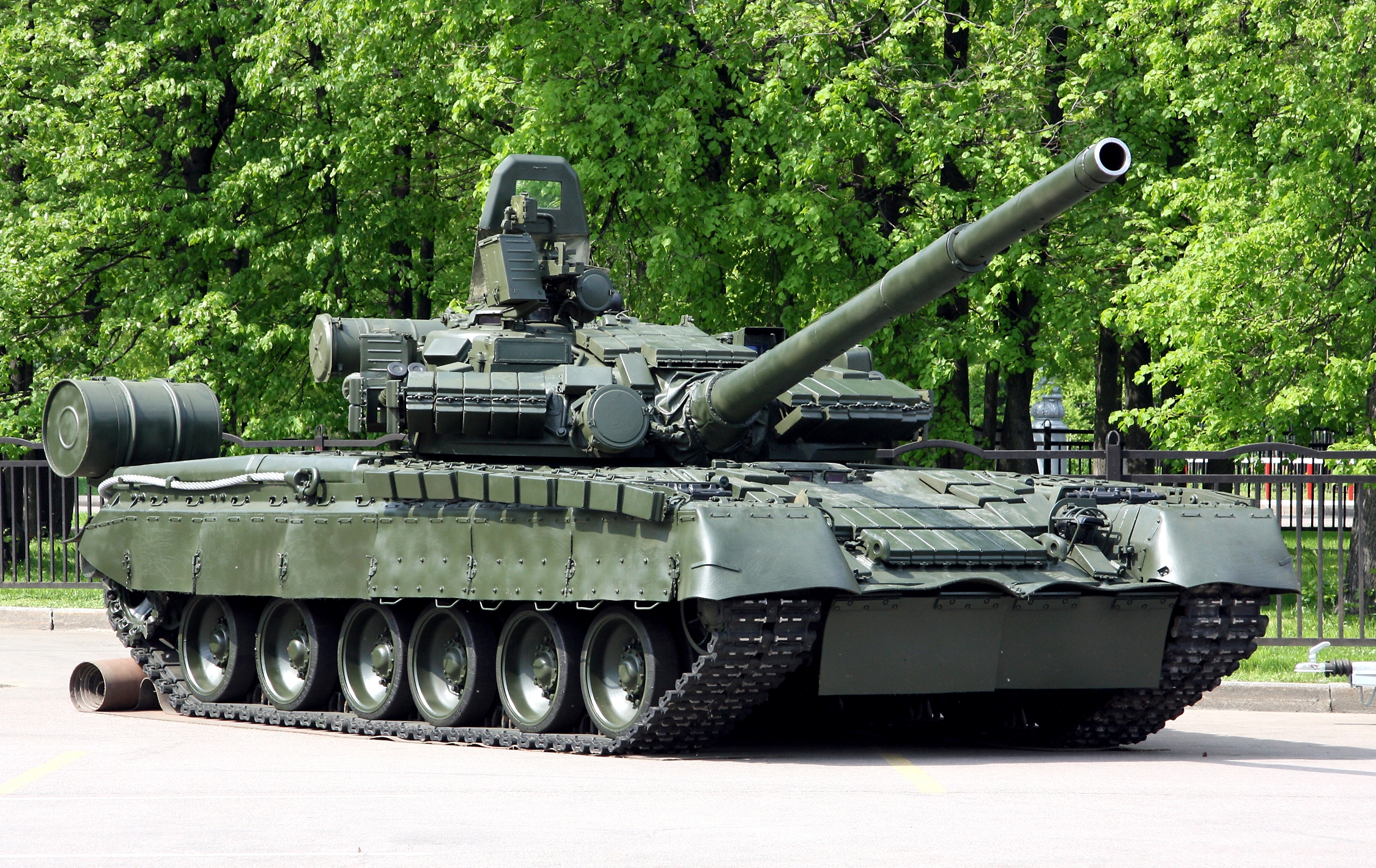
T-80BV

T-80B with Kontakt-1 explosive reactive armour. The smoke grenade launchers were moved from either side of the main armament back to the either side of the turret and positioned between the turret side and the ERA panels. On the turret of the T-80BV, the panels are joined to form a shallow chevron shape. ERA is also fitted to the forward part of the turret roof to provide protection against attacks from above. While the ERA provides a high degree of protection against ATGM of its time which relied on a HEAT warhead to penetrate armor over the frontal arc, it does not provide any added protection against APDS or APFSDS. Vehicles which were built first for sometime lacked the ERA because of supply problems. Some T-80BV tanks have been equipped with dust flap under glacis plate and some of them were equipped with single line of ERA along top of hull side. A late production version had a new turret similar to the T-80U but with Kontakt-1 ERA. There is a new gun 2A46M-1 with 9K112 Kobra system capable of firing improved 9M112M Kobra ATGM through gun barrel.

- T-80BVK – as per T-80BK but with ERA. First models were just T-80BK tanks with ERA. Later models were T-80BV tanks with additional communications equipment and an antenna.

=== T-80U (Ob'yekt 219AS) (1985) ===
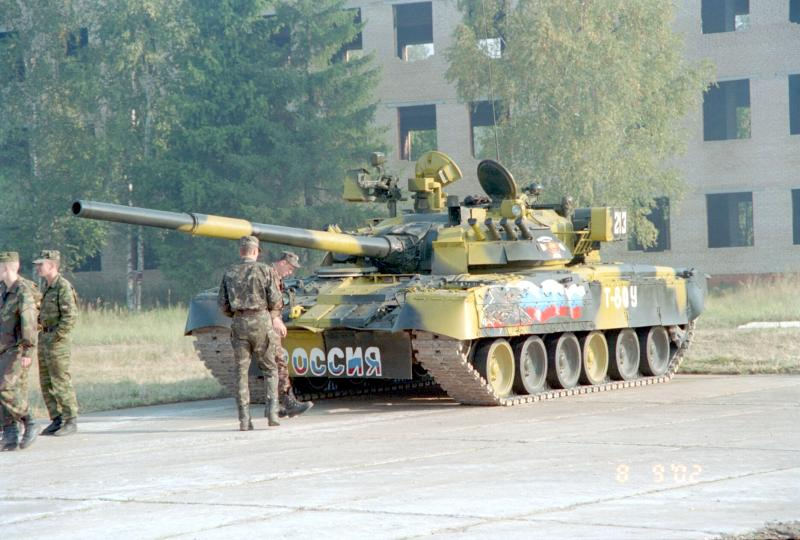
Russian T-80U, 2002

( "U" for uluchsheniye, meaning "improvement") A further development of T-80A. It was produced as a new vehicle, nothing to do with old tanks from storage. This version has a new 1,100 hp (820 kW) GTD-1000F multi-fuel gas turbine engine and new turret with improved composite armor. T-80U also received a different engine decking. Additional protection is provided by Kontakt-5 explosive reactive armour and Shtora-1 electro-optical APS. There is the same gun 2A46M-1 as on T-80BV but with a new 9K120 Svir system which allows firing 9M119 Svir (AT-11 Sniper) and 9M119 Refleks (AT-11B Sniper) ATGM through the gun barrel. Also the 12.7 mm NSVT heavy machine gun received the ability to be fired from within the turret with a use of a remote-control which work in a similar manner to the one in T-64. New fire control system 1A45 Irtysh with 1V528-1 Ballistic Computer. Buran-PA night sight for gunner. PNK-4S (Agat) day/night sight for commander. Infra-red searchlight "Luna" mounted on the commander's cupola. Like all of the previous T-80 models, the T-80U has full length rubber side skirts protecting the sides but those above the first three road wheels are armored and are provided with lifting handles. There are also rubber elements fitted beneath the front glacis which provide additional protection against mines with tilt-rod fuses and HEAT warheads. The forward skirt elements are armored and a radiation absorption liner coat is mounted on the inside and on the outside of armour. The turret roof between the commander's and gunner's hatches has been provided with additional protection against attack from above. Driver's protection, particularly against mine explosions, is enhanced by suspending the driver's seat from the hull roof. Two clusters of four 81 mm 902B Tucha electrically operated smoke dischargers are mounted on either side of the turret. Early production version of T-80U still used Kontakt-1 ERA. A special camouflage paint distorts the tank's appearance in the visible and IR wavebands. GTA-18A Auxiliary Power Unit is used when the engine is off. Late production version had a more powerful GTD-1250D multi-fuel gas turbine engine and the "Brod-M" snorkel.

- T-80U obr. 1992 – T-80U with an improved 1,250 hp (930 kW) GTD-1250 multi-fuel gas turbine engine.
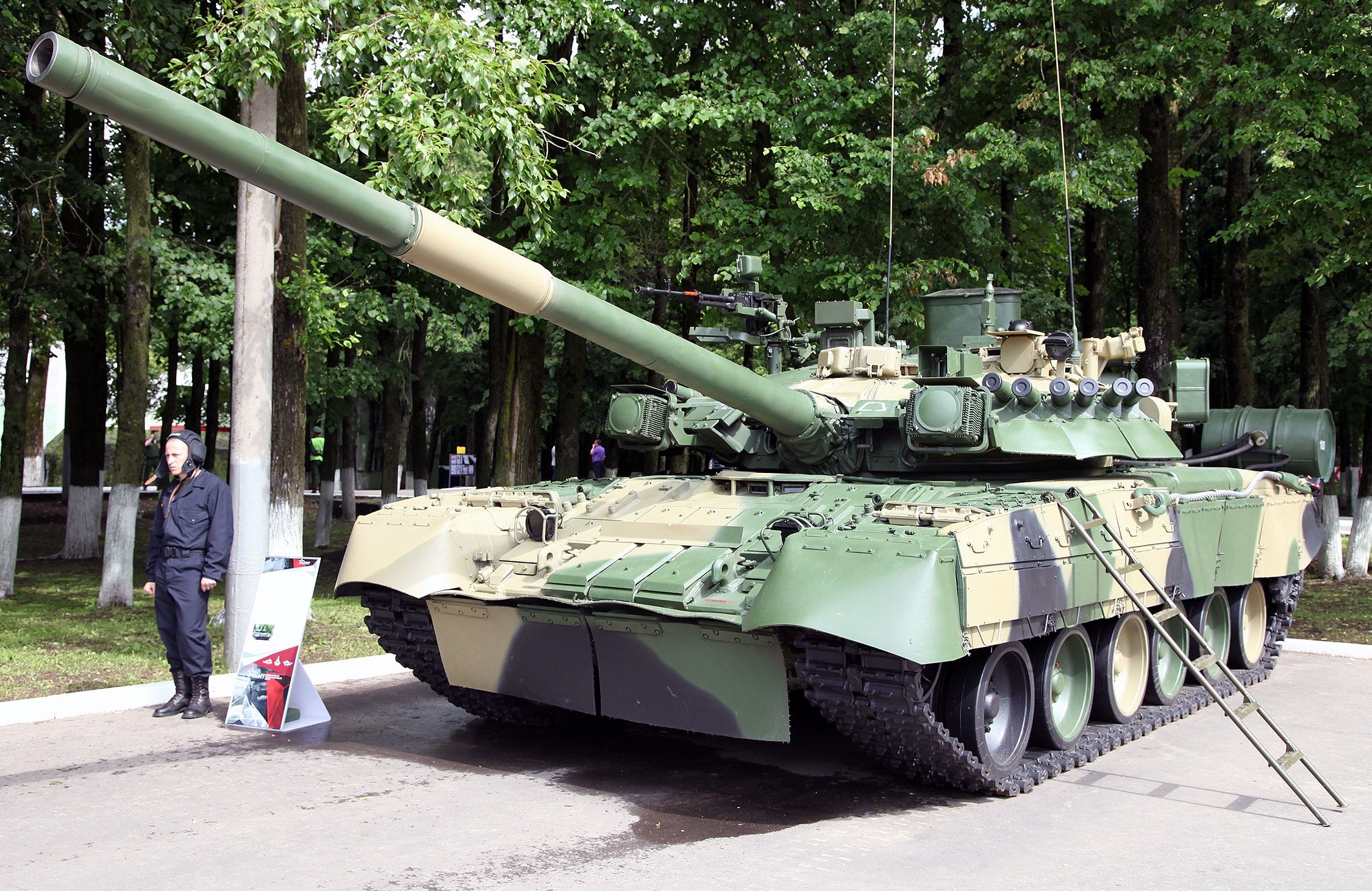
- T-80UK
  T-80UK – Command version, equipped with additional R-163-50K and R-163-U radios, TNA-4 land navigation system, TShU-1-7 Shtora countermeasures system, electronic fuze-setting device that permits use of "Ainet" shrapnel round, a meteorological sensor, laser warning receivers, "Agava-2" thermal sight which provides a 2,600-meter night acquisition range, fire control and APU. Became the main Russian export tank in the 1990s. It can be easily recognized by EO boxes on the front of turret on either side of the main armament and multiple radio antennas.
- T-80UE (1999) – Export version of the T-80U with some of the equipment from the T-80UK (including the TShU-1-7 Shtora electro-optical countermeasures system). Unlike the T-80U it does not have the anti-aircraft heavy machine gun mounted on the commander's cupola, instead it has pintle mounts at the four corners of the turret allowing its position to be switched.
- T-80UM (Object 219AS-M) – Modern version of T-80U. Modernization of 1995. Russian version with a new weapon system for the 9M119M Refleks (AT-11B Sniper) ATGM, new thermal imaging sight "Agava-M1" (optionally "Agava-2" or "Buran-R") because of which the L-4 "Luna" IR has been removed.
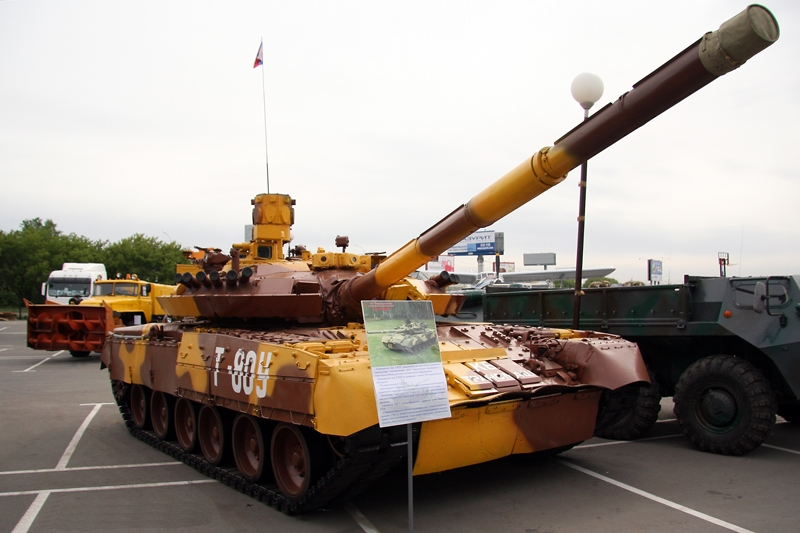
  T-80UM-1
  - T-80UM-1 "Bars" 'Snow Leopard' – Russian 1997 prototype with new Arena active protection system .
  - T-80U with KAZT Drozd active protection system, incorrectly referred to as 'T-80UM-2'. Single prototype destroyed in 2022.
  - Chorny Oryol (Ob'yekt 640) (Black Eagle) – A series of Russian demonstration prototypes with new turret including separate crew and ammunition compartments, blow-out panels on the ammunition compartment, new autoloader, Kaktus ERA, new targeting systems, and other undisclosed improvements. Six and seven-axle versions have been demonstrated.
- T-80UD "Bereza" (Ob'yekt 478B) (NATO code: SMT M1989) (1985) – (Bereza – birch-tree) Soviet (xUSSR) diesel-engined version of the T-80U, with 1,006 hp (750 kW) 6TD engine. Early production version used Kontakt-1 ERA which was later replaced with Kontakt-5 ERA.
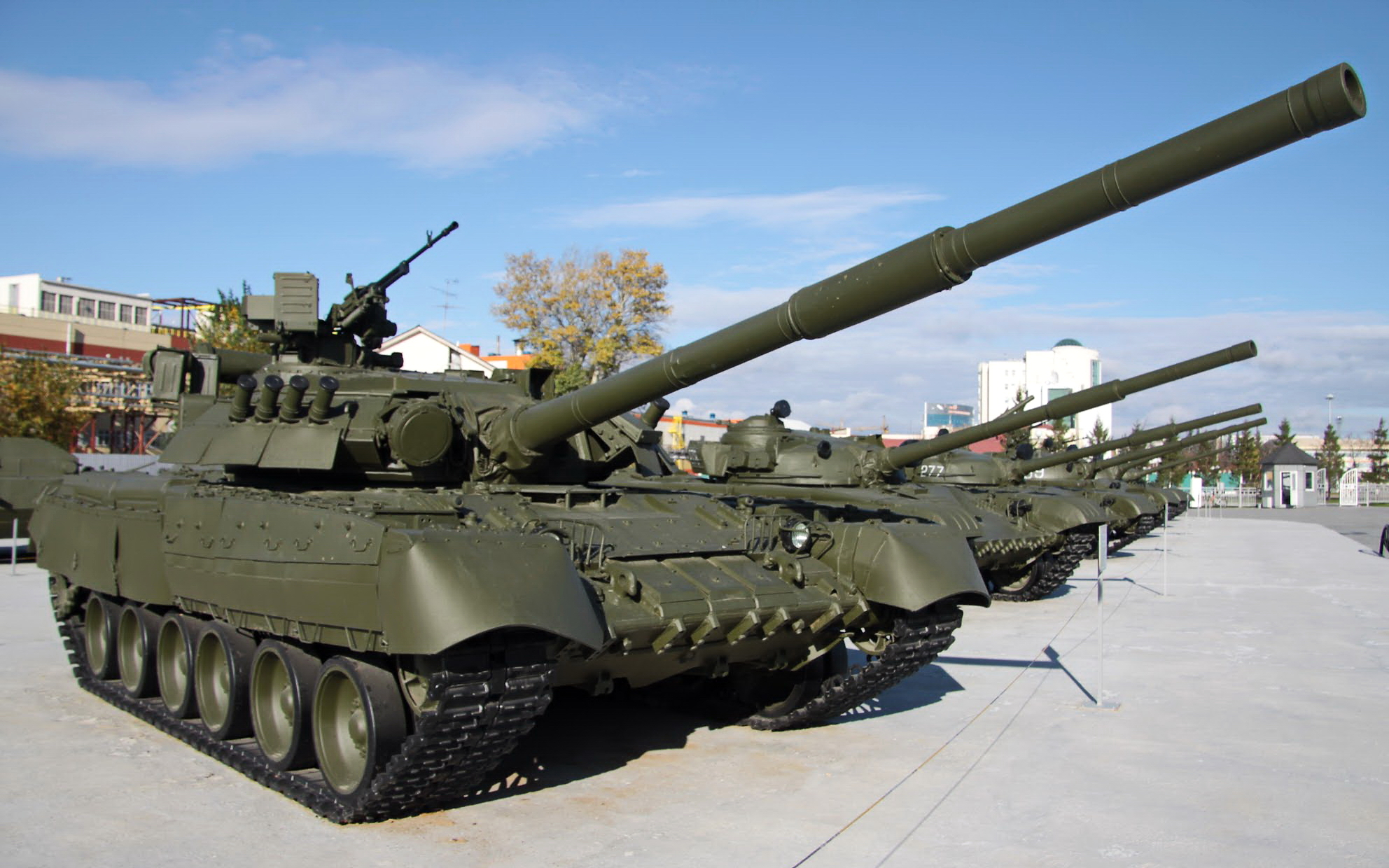
  T-80UD

- T-80UDK – T-80UD command tank. Prototype only. Всё что написано про Т-80УДК - фейк. Этот индекс не фигурирует ни в одном из документов, ни в ГРАУ, ни у ГАБТУ. а объект 484 - неизвестный, и не стоит его выдавать за несуществующий Т-80УДК
- Ob'yekt 478BK – T-80UD with a new welded turret.
- Ob'yekt 478BEh – T-80UD sold to Pakistan.
- Ob'yekt 478DU2 – Development of the T-80UD, that brought about a family of Ukrainian MBTs including T-84, T-84U, T-84 Oplot, and T-84 Yatagan models.

=== T-80BVM (2017) ===
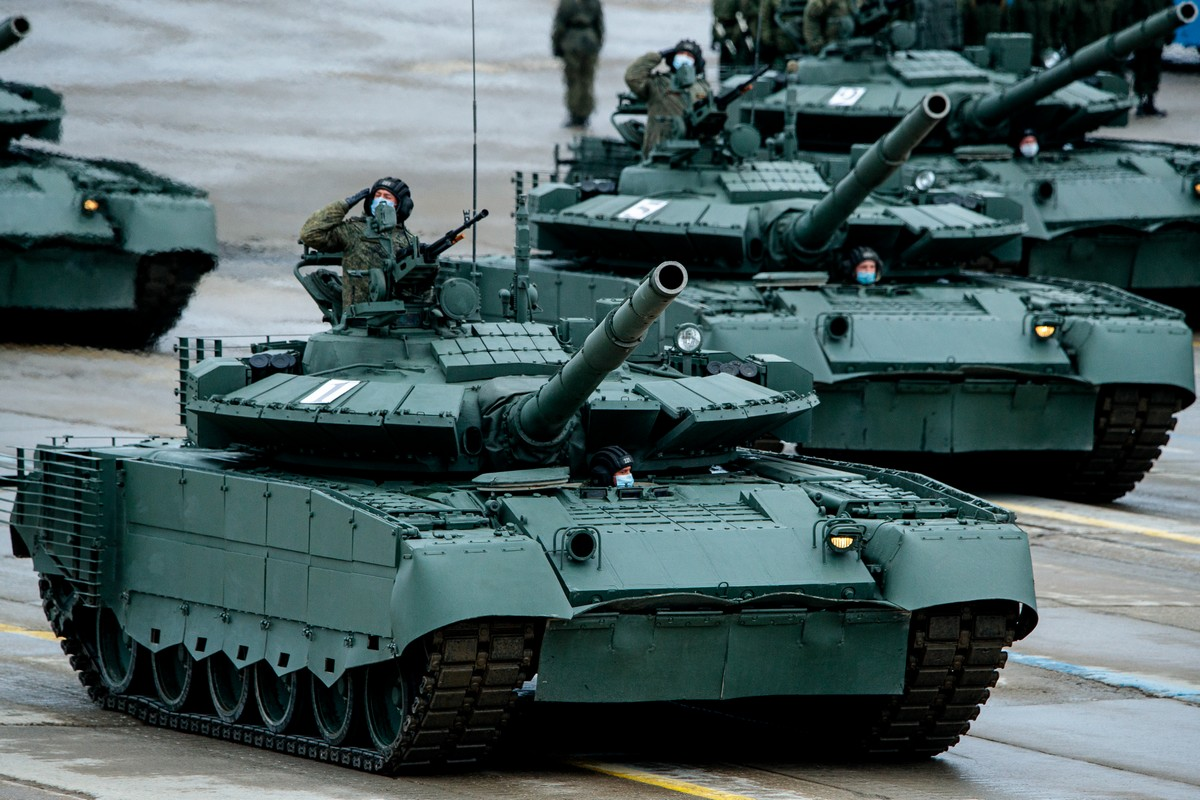
T-80BVM in 2021

By the end of 2021 up to 300 units produced by overhauling and upgrading old T-80BV tanks from storages. The idea was to make it compatible with T-90M tanks (same gun, ammunition, ATGM, ERA etc.) in order to put less strain on supply lines. New "Relikt" ERA on the turret and hull (front and sides), increased protection against land mines. Older tracks were replaced with the new universal, twin-pin design. New 2A46M-5 125mm gun with new anti-tank ammunition: the Svinets-1 (tungsten) and Svinets-2 (depleted uranium). 9K119M Refleks-M system is used to launch the 9M119M Invar (also called Refleks-M) ATGM through gun barrel. Improved 1A45T "Irtysh" fire control system (from the T-90A) with new Sosna-U gunner's sight. New panoramic sight for the commander. New radio communication. Upgraded gas turbine engine. Retained old turret, manual transmission, no APS, no GLONASS navigation. Optional "hard kill" APS Arena-M. Currently being delivered.

== Variants ==
- BREM-80U (BREM-80) – Armored recovery vehicle (ARV) based on the T-80U, with a large superstructure on the forward half of the chassis, a large square-section 18-tonne crane on the left side of hull and 35-tonne winch (in contrast to earlier Soviet ARVs which had light jib cranes). A modernized version entered production and service in 2026.
- BTU-80 – Dozer vehicle based on T-80.
- MTU-80 – Bridge layer based on T-80 chassis.
- PTS-4 – Amphibious load carrier based on T-80.
- Ladoga – Initially called Debut, this APC is designed for evacuation of Soviet government from Kremlin to airport under nuclear/chemical/biological attack. Ladoga uses tracks from the T-80U as well as suspension system and gas-turbine powerplant. The crew is 2 soldiers. It also has a four-seat cab equipped with a crew life-support facilities to protect the passengers against the radiological, chemical and bacteriological contamination of the environment.
- BREM-84 – Ukrainian ARV, based on the T-80UD but powered by the 6TD-2 engine of the T-84.
- 2S19 "Msta-S" – Self-propelled 152 mm artillery gun based on T-80 running gear and the T-72's diesel engine. There is also a NATO 155mm-barrelled version.
- T-80 chassis with RBU-6000: During Russo-Ukrainian War, at least two T-80 tank chassis were outfitted with RBU-6000 213 mm anti-submarine rocket systems, and subsequently one was reported destroyed.

== Table of specifications ==
Characteristics of the T-80 models
	T-80 (Ob'yekt 219)	T-80B (Ob'yekt 219R)	T-80BV (Ob'yekt 219RV)	T-80A (Ob'yekt 219A)	T-80U (Ob'yekt 219AS)	T-80UD "Beryoza" (Ob'yekt 478B)
Weight (metric tons)	46	42.5	43.7	51.9	46.0	46
Length (meters)	7	6.98		7.01		7.085
Width (meters)	3.60	3.58		3.60		3.56
Height (meters)	2.20	2.22		2.20		2.74
Main gun	125 mm 2A46-1 smoothbore	125 mm 2A46M-1 (D-81TM "Rapira-3") smoothbore				125 mm KBA3 smoothbore
Machine gun(s)	7.62 mm PKT coaxial tank (1,250 rounds); 12.7 mm NSVT anti-aircraft heavy (500 rounds)					7.62 mm KT-7.62 coaxial (1,250 rounds); 12.7 mm KT-12.7 anti-aircraft heavy (450 rounds)
ATGM (NATO designation)	None	9M112 Kobra (AT-8 Songster) (6 missiles)		9M119M Refleks (AT-11B Sniper)	9M119 Svir (AT-11 Sniper) and 9M119M Refleks (AT-11B Sniper)	
Engine	GTD-1000T multi-fuel gas turbine developing 1,000 hp (746 kW)	GTD-1000T (GTD-1000TF for T-80B obr.1980) multi-fuel gas turbine developing 1,000 hp (746 kW) (1,100 hp (820 kW) for GTD-1000TF)	GTD-1000TF multi-fuel gas turbine developing 1,100 hp (820 kW)	GTD-1000M multi-fuel gas turbine developing 1,200 hp (895 kW)	GTD-1000F (GTD-1250 for T-80U obr.1992) multi-fuel gas turbine developing 1,100 hp (820 kW) (1,250 hp (932 kW) for GTD-1250)	6TD twin-stroke, multi-fuel, liquid-cooled 6-cylinder diesel developing 1,006 hp (750 kW)
Speed (km/h)	70 (road); 48 (off-road)					65 (road); 45 (off-road)
Operational range (km)	500 (road); 335 (off-road); 600 (road, extra tanks)			500 km (road); 335 (off-road); 900 (road, extra tanks)		580 km (road); 450 km (off-road)
Power-to-weight ratio (hp/tonne (kW/tonne))	21.7 (16.2)	23.5 (17.6) (25.9 (19.3) for T-80B obr.1980)	25.2 (18.8)	23.1 (17.2)	23.9 (17.8) (27.2 (20.3) for T-80U obr.1992)	21.9 (16.3)
