= Psycholula =

Studio album by Mad Heads
- Released: 1996
- Recorded: 1995/1996
- Genre: Rockabilly
- Length: 49:03
- Labels: Crazy Love records Comp Music EMI
- Producer: Stupka Oleg

Mad Heads chronology
Psycholula (1996)	Mad In Ukraine (1998)

Psycholula is the first album from the rockabilly band Mad Heads. It was released in Germany and was very successful. The most famous song from this album was "Mad Heads Boogie".

This album has been released in Germany (1996) and in Ukraine (2006). Some of the tracks from it, "Mad Heads Boogie" and "" Twanging, Beating & Shouts" appeared on Ukraine-released compilation albums Naykrascha Myt.

== Track listing ==
1. "Never Die" - 1:59
2. " Evil People" - 4:00
3. " N.D.E." - 3:09
4. "The Nails" - 3:22
5. "Cheap Chick Baby" - 2:02
6. "I Wait" - 5:27
7. "Rockin' Brain" - 3:28
8. " Ghost" - 3:19
9. "Timid Guy" - 3:36
10. " Through The Night" - 3:38
11. " Mad Heads Boogie" - 2:38
12. " Twanging, Beating & Shouts" - 4:25
13. " Elephants' Run" - 4:17
14. " Welcome" - 3:36

== Video ==
- Ghost by V.Yakimenko

== Personnel ==
- Vadym Krasnooky – vocal, guitar
- Stas Lisovsky – doublebass
- Bogdan Ocheretyany – backing vocals, drums
