= Nadiya Yea =

Studio album by Mad Heads XL
- Released: 2005
- Recorded: 2004–2005
- Genre: ska punk Ukrainian Folk
- Length: 56:07
- Label: Comp Music EMI
- Producer: Shevchenko Oleg "White"

Mad Heads XL chronology
Contact (2003)	Nadiya Yea (2005)	Naykrascha Myt (2007)

Nadiya yea is the first album from the Ukrainian ska-punk band Mad Heads XL after the former band Mad Heads was complemented with a three piece brass section. It was released in Ukraine and has had great success.

The album consists of several covers of Ukrainian folk songs and a cover of the song Don't Worry be happy by Bobby McFerrin.

Tracks from it, "Надія є" (Nadiya Yea), "Автобус Буратін" (Avtobus Buratin), "Пісня світла"(Pisnya Svitla) and "Смерека" (Smereka) appear on the Ukraine-released compilation album Naykrascha Myt.

== Track listing ==
1. " Смерека" (Smereka) - 2:31
2. " Надія Є" (Nadiya Yea) - 2:35
3. " Дубки" (Dubky) - 3:17
4. " Пісня світла" (Pisnya Svitla) - 3:45
5. " Цигани" (Tsygany) - 2:25
6. " Гроші" (Groshi) - 3:37
7. " Річенька" (Richenka) - 4:14
8. " Спека Зимова" (Speka Zymova) - 3:45
9. " Gangster's Days" - 4:13
10. " Don't Worry"- 5:34
11. " Nadiya Yea" - 3:27
12. " Автобус буратін" (Autobus Buratin) - 4:28
13. " Younger" - 3:24
14. " Радіо Вавилон" (Radio Babylon) - 4:27
15. " Надія Є"(ремікс) (Nadiya Yea - remix)- 3:27

== Video ==
- Надія Є (Nadiya Yea) by O. Mykhaylenko and Viktor Pryduvalov
- Надія Є - ремікс (Nadiya Yea - remix) O. Mykhaylenko and O. Kostromin
- Смерека (Smereka) by Madtwins
- Пісня світла (Pisnya Svitla) by D. Malkov
- Автобус буратін (Autobus Buratin) by U. Morozov

== Personnel ==
- Vadym Krasnooky – vocal, guitars
- Maxym Krasnooky – spacebass
- Bogdan Ocheretyany – drums
- Maxym Kochetov - saxophone
- Vadym Nikitan - trumpet
- Valeriy Chesnokov - trombone

== Guests appearances ==
- Anton "Burito" Buryko - trumpet (track 2)
- Volodymyr Pushkar – trombone (track 2)
- Serhiy Chehodayev - bass (track 10)
- Serhiy Fomenko - vocals (track 5)
- Victor Strannik - remix
