= Mad in Ukraine =

Mad In Ukraine

Studio album by Mad Heads
- Released: 1998
- Recorded: 1998
- Genre: Rockabilly, psychobilly
- Length: 44:34
- Label: Comp Music EMI
- Producer: Shevchenko Oleg "White"

Mad Heads chronology
Psycholula (1996)	Mad In Ukraine (1998)	Naked Flame (2002)

Mad In Ukraine is the second album from the neo-rockabilly band Mad Heads. It was released in 1998.

The tracks, "Sharks", "Corrida", "Black Cat" and "Treat Me Bad" appeared on Ukraine-released compilation album Naykrascha Myt.

== Track listing ==
1. " Invasion (Aliens in town)" - 3:21
2. " Radioactive Rock" - 3:15
3. " Black Cat" - 3:58
4. " Sharks" - 2:47
5. " Tram In Lunacy" - 4:23
6. " Undertaker's Party" - 3:53
7. " Summertime Rock" - 3:05
8. " Starbiker" - 3:02
9. " Treat Me Bad" - 4:23
10. " Come & be Mine" - 2:45
11. " Corrida" - 3:20
12. " Chernobilly Beat" - 3:08
13. " Ukrainian Horror Show" - 3:08

== Video ==
- Black Cat
- Sharks

== Personnel ==
- Vadym Krasnooky – vocal, guitar
- Maxym Krasnooky – doublebass
- Bogdan Ocheretyany – drums
