= Mad Heads XL =

Ukrainian ska punk band

- Origin: Kyiv, Ukraine
- Genres: Ska; Punk; Folk
- Years active: 2003
- Label: Comp Music EMI
- Members: Vadym Krasnooky; Maxym Krasnooky; Vadym Nikitan; Valeriy Chesnokov; Volodymyr Zyumchenko; Bohdan Humenyuk
- Website: madheads.kiev.ua

Mad Heads XL is a Ukrainian ska punk band from Kyiv.

Its members experiment with folk songs, including those of Balkan bands. In their work, musicians combine several styles at once. For 10 years, the band focused on writing songs in the rockabilly genre. After that, in 2004, they changed their style to ska punk.

== History ==
=== Mad Heads ===
The band called Mad Heads was formed in Kyiv, Ukraine by Vadym Krasnooky. They quickly gained popularity and played for many years, with 4 recorded studio albums, frequent TV appearances and constant live touring. They are also well-known band in the psychobilly scene in Eastern Europe and across the world.

Their debut album “Psycholula” was out in 1996 on Crazy Love Records in Germany, while in Ukraine they were already a well known band. They filmed a video to support their album, and it was rotated on the national channels.

Soon after, Mad Heads started to tour abroad. They appeared 4 times at Rock’n’Roll Jamboree in Finland, 3 times at Calella Psychobilly Meeting in Spain, they rocked the halls of many festivals and clubs in Russia, Germany, United Kingdom, Netherlands, Poland and Italy. They've been invited to the United States, but couldn't make it because of some visa problems.

The debut album was followed by “Mad In Ukraine” in 1998 and “Naked Flame” in 2002 (both out on Crazy Love Records) which brought the acknowledgment for Mad Heads among the psychobilly community. Then, in 2003, the album “Contact” was released with all the songs in the mother languages (the first 3 albums were in English). This record was out on local EMI licensee Comp Music.

In 2004 the group changed its style. Their music was changing throughout the years, and it didn't fit psychobilly scene anymore. So they took it even further, doubled the line up with 3-piece brass section and mixed up their older sounds with ska punk and some Ukrainian folk. The new project was called Mad Heads XL.

=== Mad Heads XL ===
In the beginning of 2004, the new project Mad Heads XL was born. The line up was doubled with the powerful brass section (trumpet, trombone, saxophone) and the music drifted in the direction of ska with a touch of swing and Ukrainian folk.

In March 2004 they played in the music clubs of Kyiv, in April appeared on top Ukrainian TV channels and in May the band came up the stage of the main Ukrainian music festival Tavria Games to perform for 75,000 people. There was also a live broadcast on M1 – the main Ukrainian music TV channel. That show brought the band to 9 more big open air stages in the next few months, with the audience varied from 5,000 to 100,000 (Day of Youth on the main Kyiv's square, Maidan Nezalezhnosti). In September 2004 the band was invited to take part in Djuice-Drive tour (sport palaces in the 6 biggest cities of Ukraine). They were the only Ukrainian act on the bill with artists from Western Europe.

They were among the first bands to support the people of Ukraine in the protest action, when the Orange Revolution started. Group cancelled their commercial gigs and played on the central square of Kyiv, Maidan Nezalezhnosti. They performed their new song "Orange Songs of Ukrainian Revolution", and later the profit from this song was transferred to the inhabitants of the protest camping. Their performance on Maidan was seen on CNN as well as on several European news channels.

In 2005 the band was on the road again and played plenty open air stages all over Ukraine. Mad Heads XL also appeared abroad, at Rock for People 2005 festival in Czech Republic. In September 2005 ZYX Music released maxi-CD “Nadiya Yea” in Germany. The album “Nadiya Yea” was released in the end of October on Comp Music/EMI, so far in Ukraine only, and it was among the bestselling local releases of 2005. During 2004–2005 years the band had several line-up changes.

Beyond Europe, Mad Heads XL have performed at Ukrainian festivals in Toronto, Ontario, Canada in 2010, and Dauphin, Manitoba, in 2011. Commanding a strong fan base in the Ukrainian-Canadian community, they returned to Toronto again in January 2012 performing material from their new album УкраїнSKA and "Royal Malanka". For both events, Mad Heads XL were joined onstage by Ukrainian violinist Vasyl Popadiuk (a.k.a. "Papa Duke"). Local Ukrainian-Canadian music groups, "Zapovid" and "Hudi a Mocni" opened their shows. In 2018, they played in Ottawa.

== Current members ==
- Vadym Krasnooky - vocal, guitar, songwriting (1991–present)
- Maxym Krasnooky - bass (1996–present)
- Vadym Nikitan - trumpet (2004–present)
- Valeriy Chesnokov - trombone (2005–present)
- Volodymyr Zyumchenko - drums (2005–present)

== Former members ==
- Bohdan Ocheretyany - drums (1994–2005)
- Maksym Kochetov – saxophone (2004–2006)
- Anton Buryko – trumpet (2004–2005)
- Volodymyr Pushkar – trombone (2004–2005)
- Bohdan Humenyuk - saxophone, flute (2006–2008)

== Albums ==
Mad Heads

- 1996 - Psycholula
- 1998 - Mad In Ukraine
- 1999 - 1st Ukrainian Rockabilly Front
- 2002 - Naked Flame
- 2003 - Contact (Контакт)

Mad Heads XL

- 2005 - Nadiya Yea (Надія Є/The Hope Is Here)
- 2007 - Naykrascha Myt - compilation (Найкраща Мить/The Best Moment)
- 2008 - Forever
- 2011 - УкраїнSKA
- 2015 - 8
