= Garikai Mutasa =

Zimbabwean novelist (born 1952)

Garikai N. Mutasa (born 1952) is a Zimbabwean novelist. His novel The Contact (1985) is a victory story of the ZANLA guerrillas, based on Soviet socialist realist models. He previously trained as a teacher at Gweru Teacher's College
