= Contact (Mad Heads album) =

Studio album by Mad Heads
- Released: 2003
- Recorded: 2002–2003
- Genre: psychobilly punk
- Length: 51:49
- Label: Comp Music EMI
- Producer: Shevchenko Oleg "White"

Mad Heads chronology
Naked Flame (2002)	Contact (2003)	Nadiya Yea (2005)

Contact is the fourth album from the Ukrainian psychobilly band Mad Heads. It was released in Ukraine and in Germany and it was the first album consisting only of Ukrainian and Russian language songs.

Lyrics of songs "Не По пути" (Ne Po Puti) and "Не Чекай" (Ne Cheakay) by Shtoyko Kostyantin.

The tracks "Не Чекай" (Ne Cheakay), "Не По пути" (Ne Po Puti), "Отрута"(Otruta) and "Вженема" (VzeNema) appeared on the Ukraine-released compilation album Naykrascha Myt.

== Track listing ==
1. " Контакт" (Contact) - 2:31
2. " Не По Пути" (Ne Po Puti) - 2:35
3. " Отрута" (Otruta) - 3:17
4. " Не Чекай" (Ne Cheakay) - 3:45
5. " Циклон" (Cyclone) - 2:25
6. " Параллельный Мир" (paralellniy Mir) - 3:37
7. " Привиди" (Prividi) - 4:14
8. " Хот Род Бугі Вугі" (Hot Rod Boogie Woogie) - 3:45
9. " Брюс Уиллис" (Bruce Willis) - 4:13
10. " Вуду" (Woodoo)- 5:34
11. " Козаки" (Cossack)- 3:27
12. " У Минулому Житті" (U Minulomu Jitti) - 4:28
13. " Вженема" (VzeNema) - 3:24
14. " Свінгсайз" (Swingsize) - 4:27

== Video ==
- Отрута (Otruta) by Viktor Pryduvalov (Mental drive studio)
- Не Чекай (Ne Cheakay) by Re:evolution studio
- Не По Пути (Ne Po Puti) by Madtwins

== Personnel ==
- Vadym Krasnooky – vocal, guitar
- Maxym Krasnooky – double bass
- Bogdan Ocheretyany – drums

== Guest appearances ==
- Maxym Kochetov - saxophone
- Anton "Burito" Buryko - trumpet
- Valeriy Chesnokov - trombone
- Andriy Golovko - trombone
- Ivan Bondar - saxophone
