= Kontakt-5 =

Type of explosive reactive vehicle armour

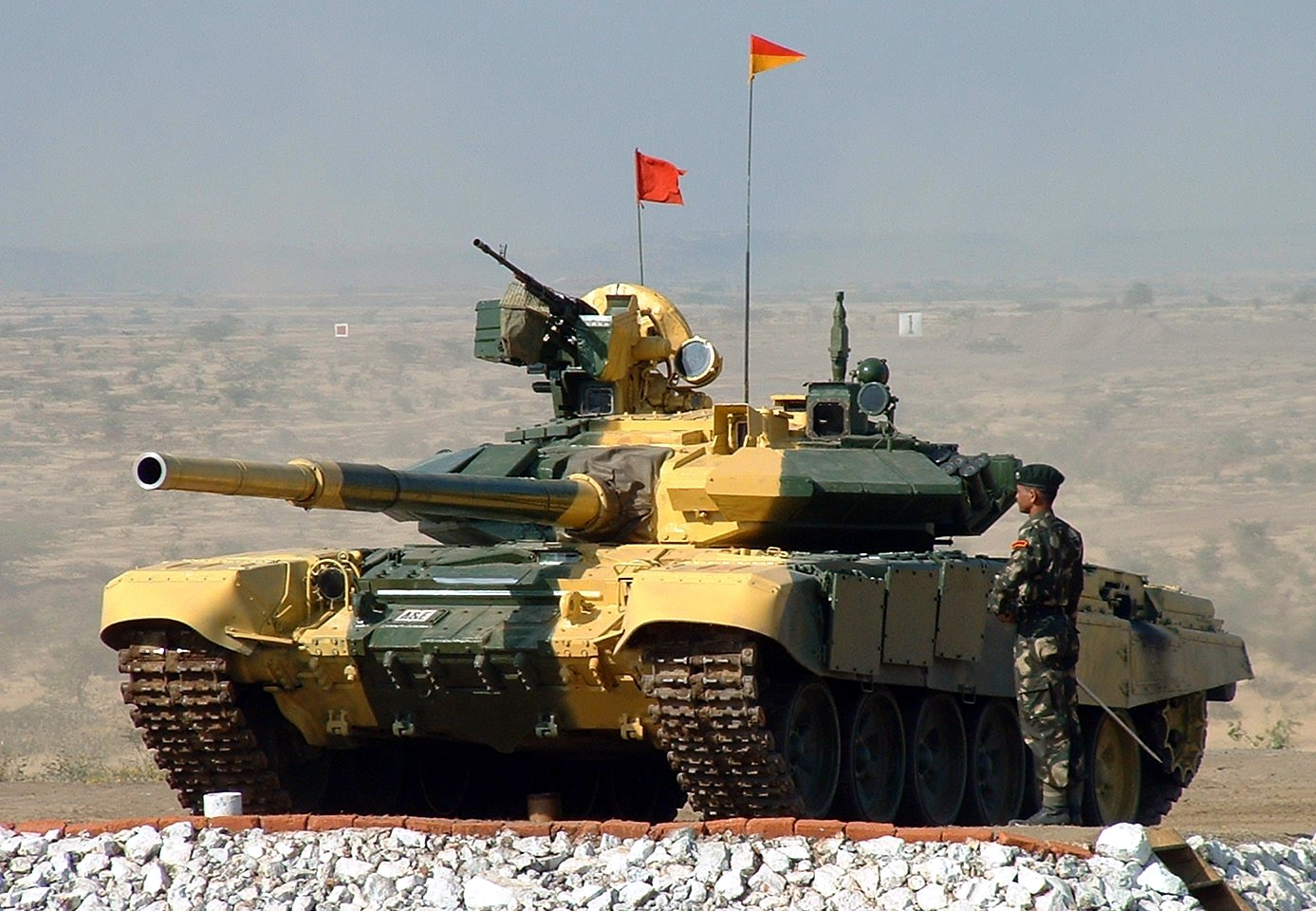
The advanced Kontakt-5 explosive reactive armour on this Indian Army T-90S is arranged in pairs of plates with a triangular profile

Kontakt-5 is a type of second-generation explosive reactive armour (ERA) originating in the Soviet Union. Due to the shortcomings of Kontakt-1, NII Stali developed a new type of reactive armor, Kontakt-5, so that it also affects the penetration characteristics of APFSDS projectiles, unlike Kontakt-1. In addition, Kontakt-5 is not just additional armor, but is clearly integrated into the vehicle hull. The Kontakt-5 modules have a significantly thicker steel upper side. Depending on the module, they contain one or two 4S22 reactive elements. The explosive of a 4S22 element has the TNT equivalent of 330 g. It is sensitive enough to be activated by impacts from armor-piercing projectiles as well as shaped charge warheads. Kontakt-5 produces a stronger defensive detonation than Kontakt-1 and the thicker steel flyer plate thrown at the APFSDS projectile breaks or bends it. The increase in defensive capability led to the development of more advanced APFSDS projectiles.

Kontakt-5 was first observed on a T-80U in 1985. Later, the T-72B, T-84 and T-90 tanks were also equipped with Kontakt-5. In addition, the T-55, T-62 and BMP-3 tank models can also be equipped or upgraded with Kontakt-5. According to the manufacturer, Kontakt-5 is the first type of reactive armor that effectively protects armored vehicles against tandem shaped charges.

Total mass of Kontakt-5 reactive armor: 2.8 - 3.0 t, Protective effect (RHA equivalent): against APFSDS: 200 – 250 mm, against shaped charges (HEAT): 600 mm,

== Description ==
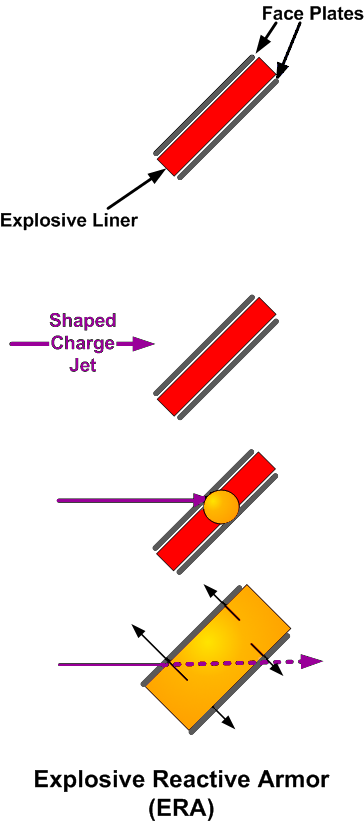
Operation of ERA

Introduced on the T-80U tank in 1985, Kontakt-5 is made up of "bricks" of explosive sandwiched between two metal plates. The plates are arranged in such a way as to move sideways rapidly when the explosive detonates. This forces an incoming kinetic energy penetrator or shaped charge jet to cut through more armour than the thickness of the plating itself since "new" plating is constantly fed into the penetrating body. A kinetic energy penetrator is also subject to powerful sideways forces which may cut the rod into two or more pieces. This significantly reduces the penetrating capabilities of the penetrator, since the penetrating force will be dissipated over a larger volume of armour.

Newer KE penetrators like the US M829A3 were "driven by the need to counter KE-effective explosive reactive armor (ERA)".

Relikt was designed by the Russian army in response to the new developments. Relikt is the 3rd generation of Russian ERA, and is claimed to be twice as effective as Kontakt-5. It can be installed on T-72B and T-90 tanks and was adopted in 2006. The Russian Army T-72B3M main battle tank incorporates Relikt. Developed by NII Stali, Relikt uses a completely new composition of explosives to achieve dynamics protection. Unlike Kontakt-1, it works equally reliably against both low-velocity and high-velocity missiles, doubling protection against shaped charges and increasing anti-tank guided missile protection by 50 percent. Relikt defends against tandem warheads and reduces penetration of APFSDS rounds by over 50 percent.

Kontakt-5 armour is employed by Russia, Ukraine, India (T-90S) and Serbia (on M-84AS MBT), among others.

Monolith (which is often confused with the "Malachit" that was used on the Objekt.187) is the latest (4th) generation Russian explosive reactive armor, mounted on Armata project vehicles.

== Operators ==
- Algeria: T-72AG T-90SA.
- Armenia: T-72B1 Obr.1989 and T-90S.
- Azerbaijan: T-90S
- Belarus: T-72B3
- Cyprus: T-80U and T-80UK.
- India: T-90S
- Iran: Relikt allegedly on Karrar and on a T-72M upgrade by the IRGC, dubbed T-72M Rakhsh. Kontakt-5 used on an unnamed T-72S upgrade.
- Iraq: T-90S and T-72M Rakhsh.
- Mongolia: BMP-1 and few other tanks, vehicles.
- Russia: T-72B Obr.1989, T-72B3 and T-90.
- Serbia: M-84AS
- South Korea: T-80U and T-80UK.
- Syria: T-72B3, T-90 and T-90A.
- Turkmenistan: T-90S
- Uganda: T-90S
- Ukraine: T-72B3 and T-90.
- Vietnam: T-90S

=== Former operators ===
- Artsakh: T-72B1 Obr.1989 and T-90S.
- Soviet Union: Passed on to successor states.

== See also ==
- Vehicle armour
- Kontakt-1
