= Kontakt-1 =

Soviet first generation explosive reactive armour

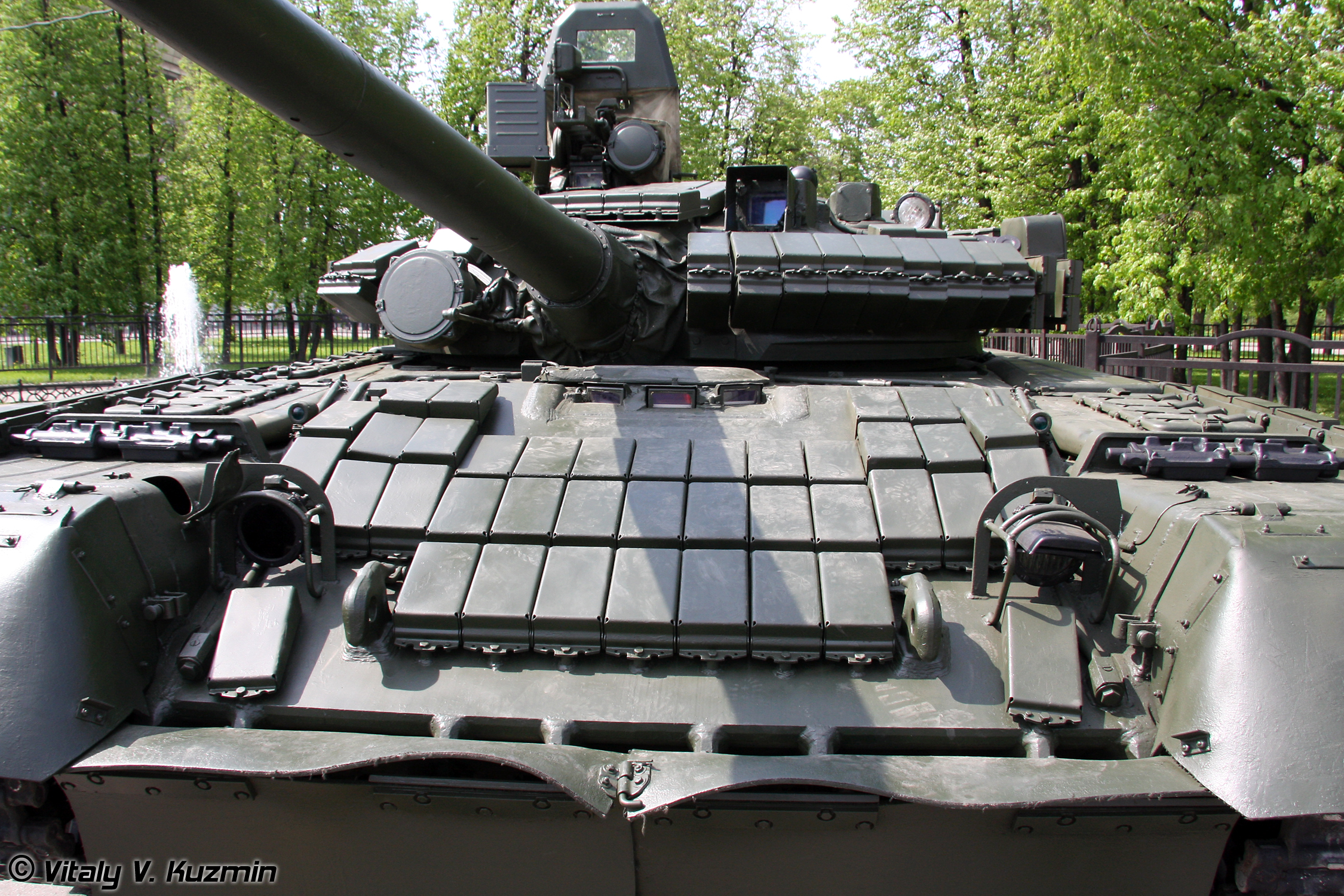
Kontakt-1 on the upper glacis and turret of a T-80BV

Kontakt-1 (Russian: Контакт-1; GRAU indice: 4S20) is an explosive reactive armour (ERA) created in 1982 by Soviet NII Stali to protect tanks from shaped charges. The first tank with Kontakt-1 put into service was T-64BV in 1985. The system is still widely used by different countries within T-55, T-62, T-64, T-72, T-80 tank families among others.

Kontakt-1 was the first Soviet ERA system, and its successor is Kontakt-5, put into the service in 1988.

== Description ==
Kontakt-1 is a first-generation ERA, which means it is used as appliqué ‘bricks’. Its second-generation successors, such as Kontakt-5 and Relikt, have heavier built-in discharging plates.

The ERA system consists of hundreds of standalone containers often referred to as "bricks." Each container includes two 252×130×10 mm ERA panels positioned at an angle relative to each other. A single panel is 5.4 mm thick with a 260g explosive (85% hexogen) liner, surrounded by a 2.3 mm thick steel sheet. The container weighs 5.3 kg, and the full complement's weight varies from 1.2 to 2 tons depending on the number of containers used

The explosive liner is highly insensitive so that it doesn't explode from bullets or fragmentation. Even tank ammunition cook-off events do not detonate the ERA. This characteristic also prevents chain reactions for Kontakt-1, but it makes the system ineffective against kinetic energy penetrators. However, due to the fragility of the blocks, they can be easily destroyed by a hit: a HEAT round can destroy up to 85% of all the ERA from the tank's front.

When a shaped charge's jet stream hits the explosive liner, it detonates, throwing the metal plates at the stream obliquely. As a result, the jet is deformed and defocused, losing its energy. Its efficiency is low at a straight angle and increases significantly as the angle changes, explaining why Soviet tanks have a prominent wedged ERA configurations on their turrets.

Kontakt-1 is effective only against regular non-tandem shaped charges and has no effect on kinetic energy (KE) penetrators. According to the manufacturer, Kontakt-1 generally reduces penetration by 86% for Konkurs-type ATGMs, by 92% for rocket grenades, and by 52% for tank HEAT rounds.

=== Advantages ===
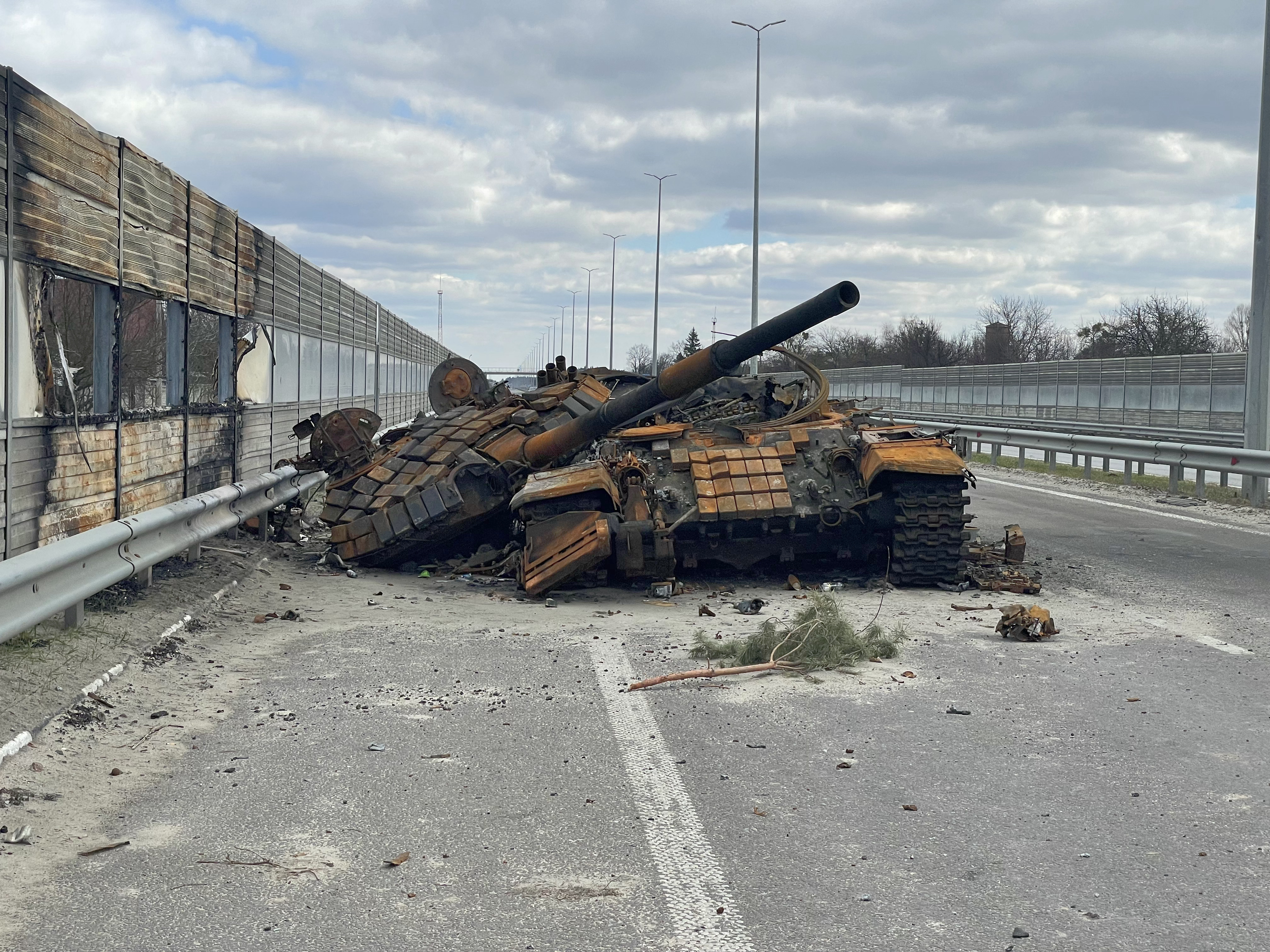
Highly insensitive Kontakt-1 can even survive after ammo cook-off

- Can be easily attached to any vehicle by its crew;
- has much greater protection/mass ratio than regular armor;
- is safe as doesn't explode from mechanical damage, firearms, fragmentation and even ammo cook-off;
- immune to chain reaction.

=== Disadvantages ===
- Significant (up to 27%) of frontal projection is not covered by ERA, turret bottom is especially vulnerable;
- containers are very fragile and can by easily wiped out by any explosion;
- as with any ERA, it is disposable
- is useless against KE penetrators and has very little effect on tandem warheads;
- the explosive nature without isolation makes it totally unsuitable for light-armored vehicles.
- the nature of ERA means that dismounted troops face danger if they are too close to the vehicle

== History ==
A common misconception is that Kontakt-1 was inspired by the Israeli Blazer, which proved efficient during the 1982 Lebanon War. According to the story, the USSR received an Israeli Magach tank following the war and managed to design its own ERA soon afterwards. However, this account is not accurate. The USSR started researching ERA in the 1950s, and the first tests were conducted in the early 1960s.

Interestingly, one of the employees involved in the process was named Bleyzer G.A. (Russian: Блейзер Г. А.), who later moved to Israel. His last name sounds similar to the Israeli Blazer ERA, but there is no evidence that this is anything more than a notable coincidence.

NII Stali was working on an integrated KDZ-68 ERA since the 1960s. It was highly effective but was deemed too heavy to be mounted. At the time, the armor of T-64 and T-72 tanks was strong enough, and the priority was to reduce the weight of the tanks. Thus, for various reasons, including an unverified claim that contemporary Soviet Chief marshal of the armored troops Hamazasp Babadzhanian was totally against explosive armor, it was abandoned. In the late 1970s, Soviet armor was not strong enough against new Western guns and ammunition, so in 1982, a new ERA system was tested, and in 1985, the first Kontakt-1-equipped T-64BV was put into service. It is likely that the demonstration of Blazer effectiveness and the capture of the Israeli tank broke the prejudices of Soviet generals against carrying high explosives on the armor and opened the door for Kontakt-1 adoption.

== Operators ==
All the countries which possess T-55AMV (see T-54/55 operators), T-62MV (see T-62 operators), T-64BV (see T-64 operators), T-72AV, T-72B, T-72AMT, T-72EA, T-72UA1, T-72MS (see T-72 operators), T-80BV (see T-80 operators) and some other tanks, are the operators of Kontakt-1.

Due to the modularity and installation simplicity, it's a common practice to put it on different vehicles in the field or factory conditions to increase protection. During the 2022 Russian invasion of Ukraine, both sides use Kontakt-1 to provide additional protection for different vehicles. Even some production vehicles equipped with more advanced Kontakt-5/Relikt ERA, such as T-72B3, receive additional Kontakt-1 at factories.

=== Ukraine ===
In 2018 Ukrainian UAM company claimed to produce Kontakt-1 and Kontakt-5 elements named 4S20U and 4S22U respectively, with brand-new explosives. They also claimed that Kontakt-1 was actually being put into the service.

Since May 2023 Ukraine has been receiving a Kontakt-1 variant produced by Czech STV Group.

Polish and Czech T-72M1 and T-72M1R and Slovenian M-55S are equipped with Kontakt-1 in Ukraine.

==== Western vehicles ====
During the delivery of Western tanks to Ukraine, Ukrainian armor experts speculated that Kontakt-1 could be a viable solution to complement weaker armor of some tanks such as the lightly armored Leopard 1. They also mentioned that such improvements should be coordinated with manufacturers and thoroughly tested.

In July 2023 a Ukrainian Leopard 2A4CAN appeared with a Kontakt-1 set and some other ‘customizations’.

In May 2024, photos of a Ukrainian M1 Abrams equipped with Kontakt-1 surfaced.

== Gallery ==
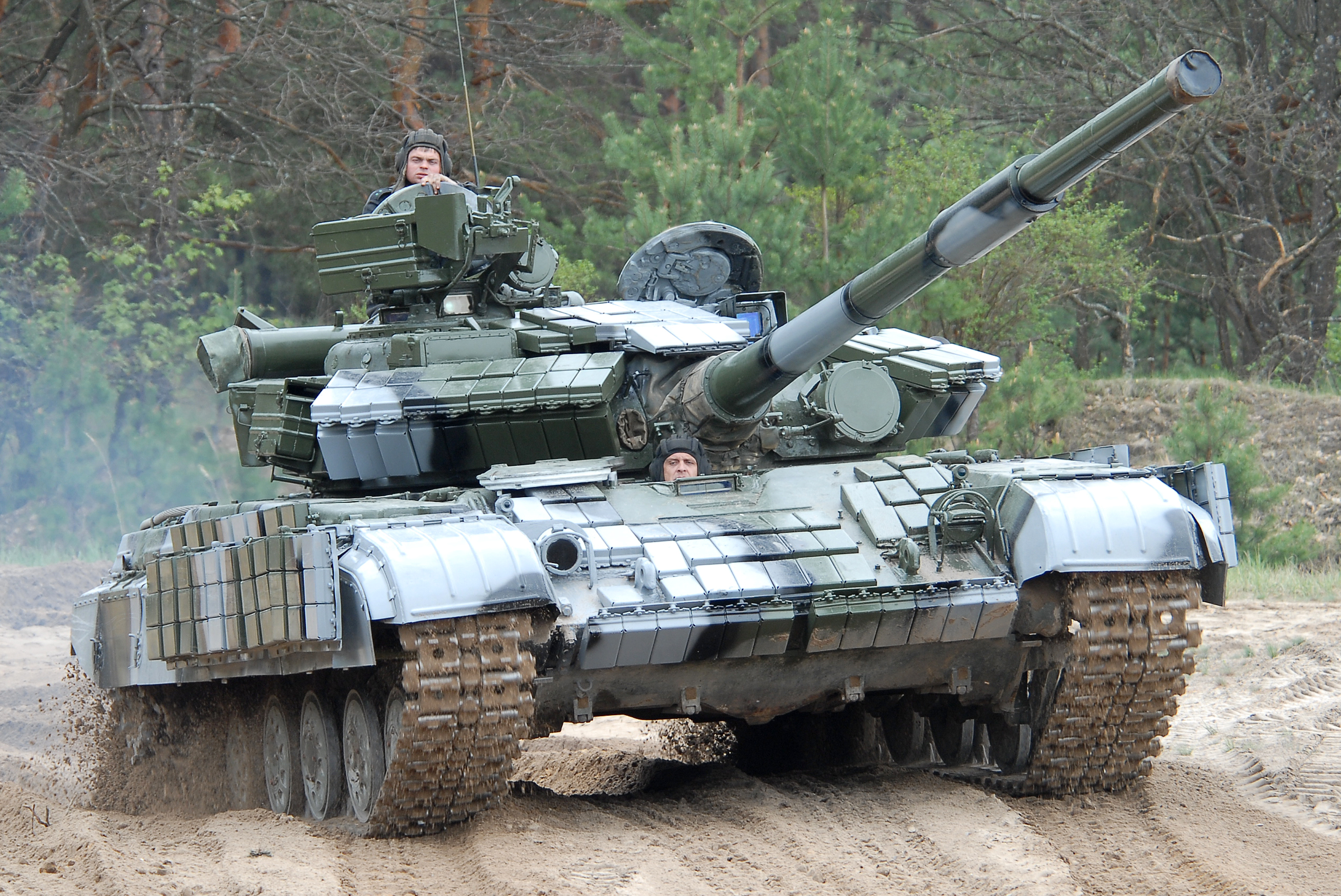
T-64BV

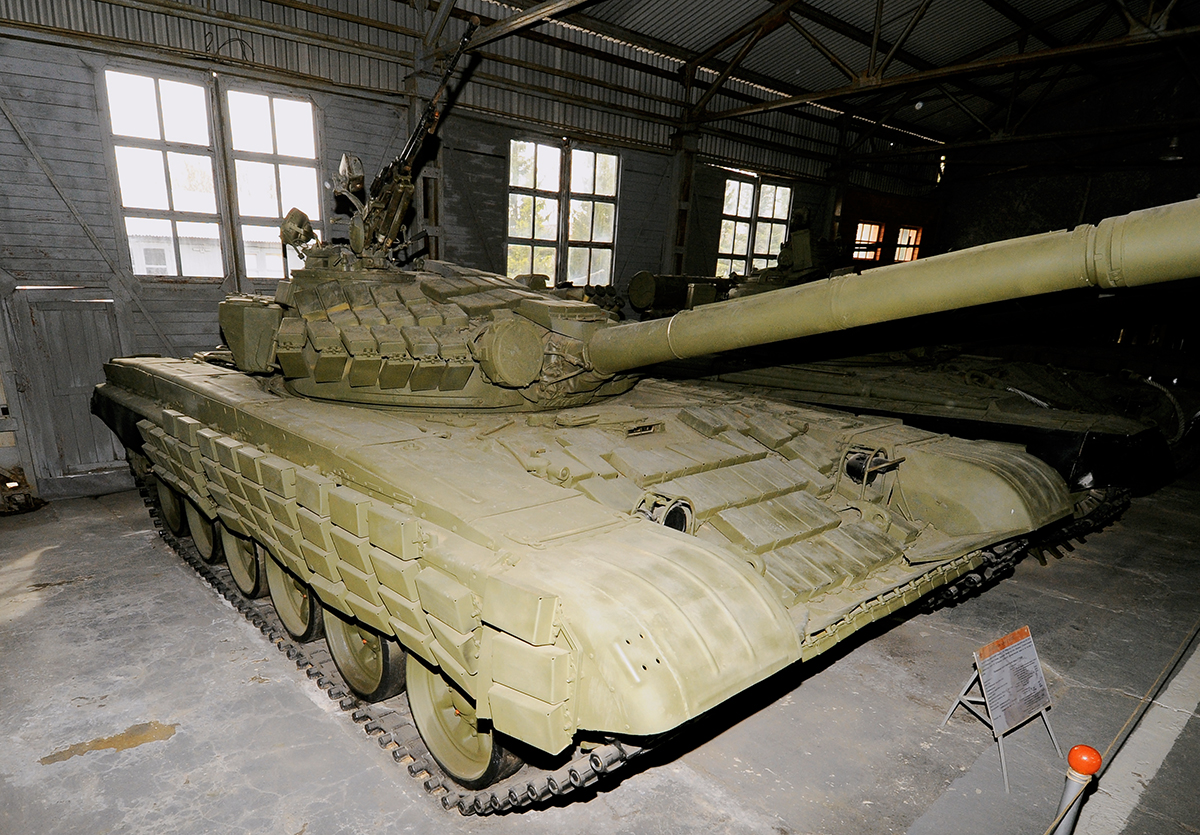
T-72AV

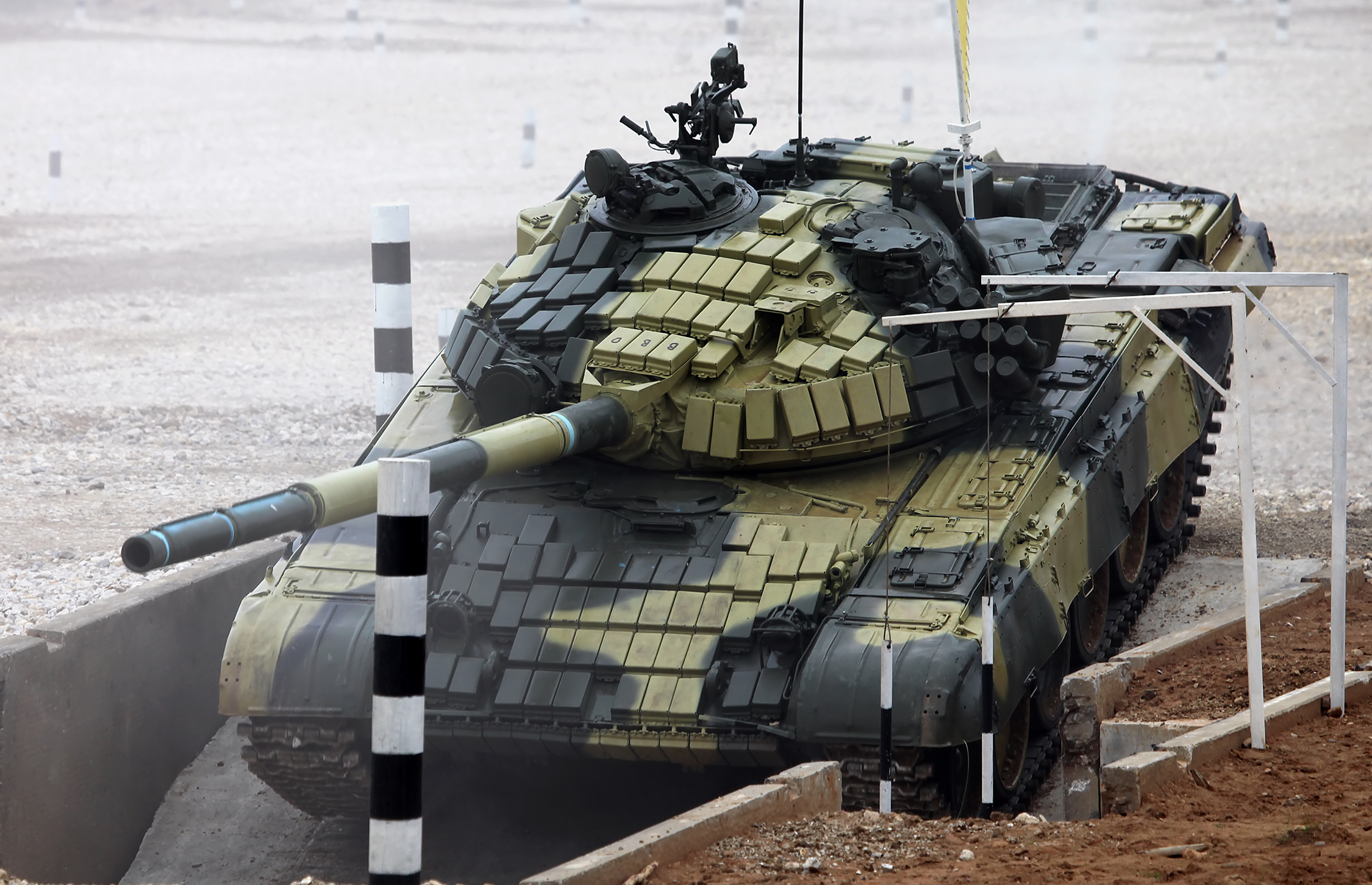
T-72B

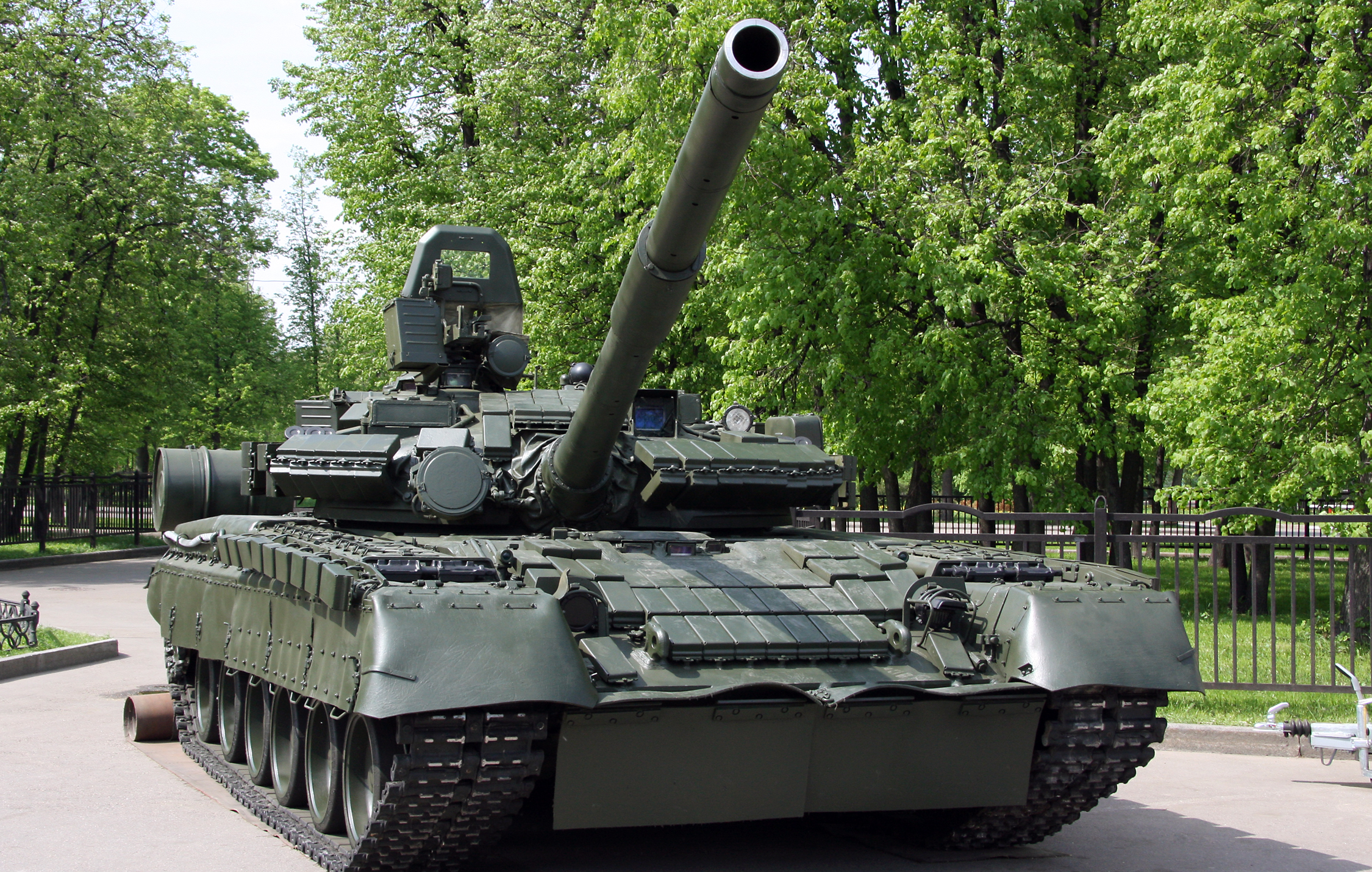
Т-80БВ

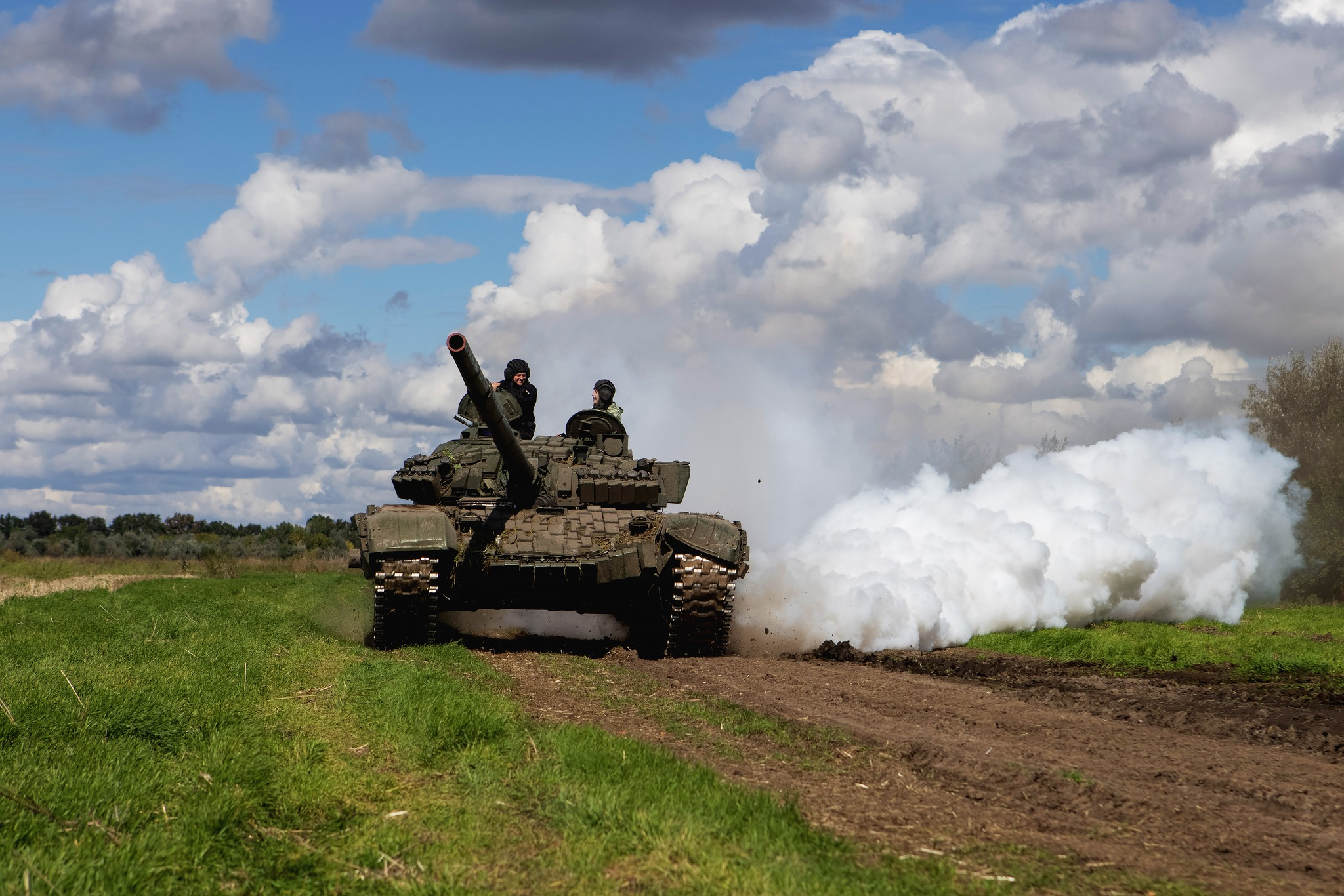
T-72M1R upgraded with Kontakt-1 in Ukraine

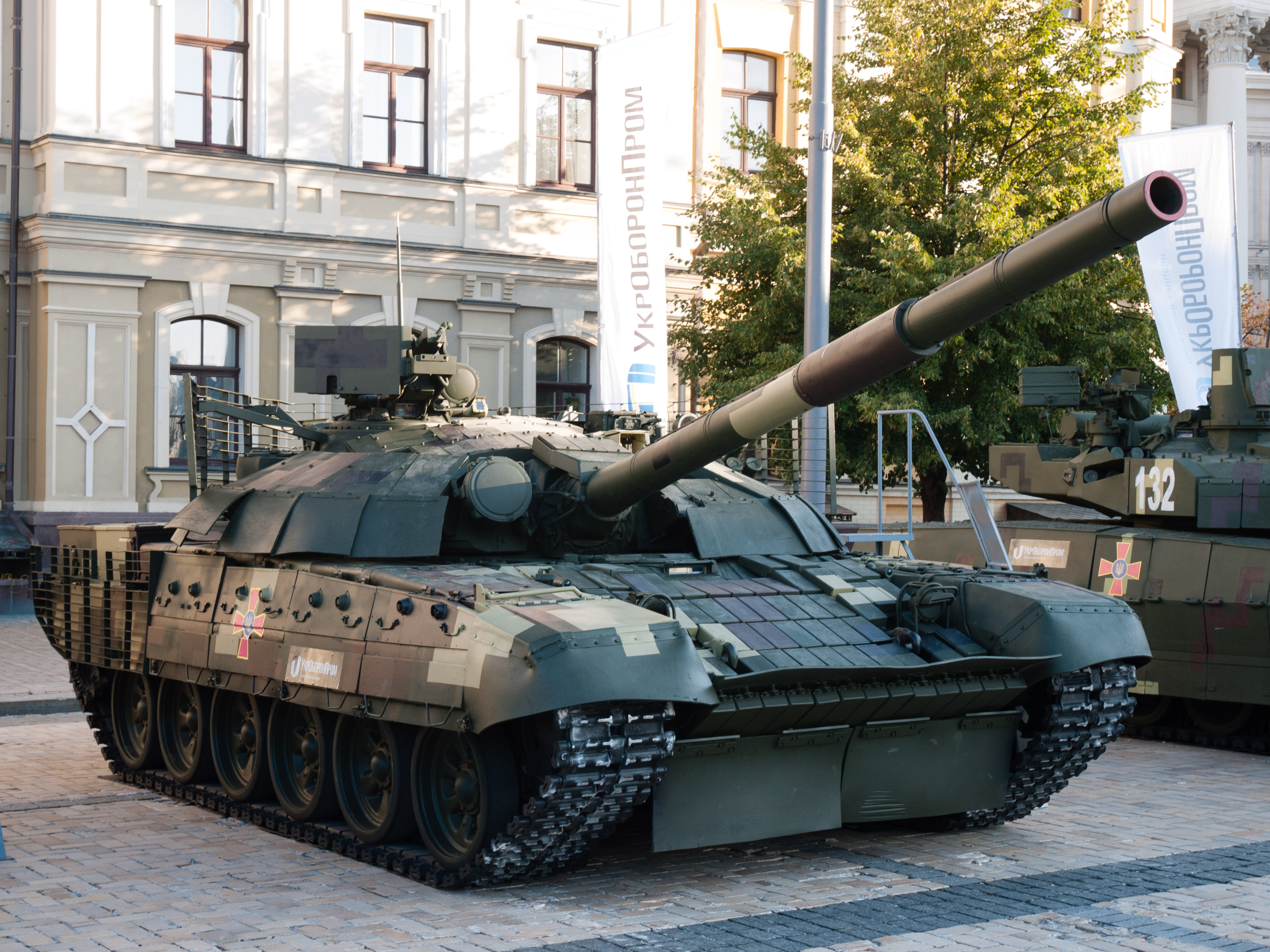
Ukrainian T-72AMT wielding both Nizh and Kontakt-1

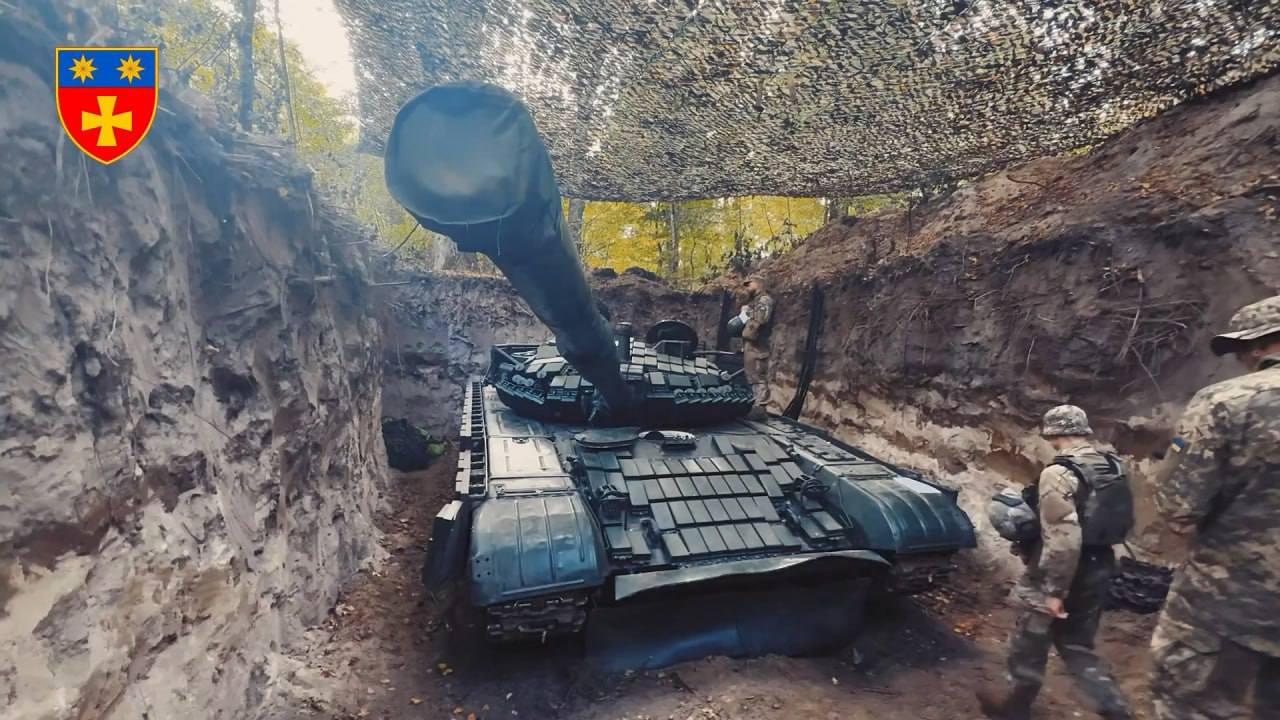
Ukrainian M-84A4 Sniper tank with Kontakt-1 reactive armor added.

== See also ==
- Kontakt-5
- Relikt
- Nizh
