= Contact, Nevada =

Unincorporated community in Nevada, U.S.

- Unincorporated community
- Location within the state of Nevada
- Coordinates: 41°46′10″N 114°45′09″W
- Country: United States
- State: Nevada
- County: Elko
- Elevation: 5,351 ft (1,631 m)
- Time zone: UTC-8 (Pacific (PST))
  - Summer (DST): UTC-7 (PDT)

Contact is an unincorporated community in Elko County, Nevada, United States. It is located on a mineral-rich granite intrusion and there are many mines nearby.

== History ==
A post office was established at Contact in 1897, and remained in operation until 1962. The name "Contact" is mining jargon.

As of 1915, Contact had a hotel, restaurant and its own local newspaper. Although a new townsite was laid out in 1930, by that time the community was once again in decline. A devastating 1942 fire effectively turned Contact into a near-ghost town. Today one of the main presences in Contact is a Nevada Department of Transportation maintenance station.

== Jackpot ==
Located approximately 15 miles (13.3 km) south of Jackpot on U.S. Route 93, prior to Jackpot's founding in 1954 Contact was known as one of the closest Nevada settlements to the Idaho border. Early records of Cactus Pete's (then known as Cactus Pete's Desert Lodge) placed the property in Contact before Jackpot emerged as a separate settlement.
