= 2015 Moscow Victory Day Parade =

Russian military parade

Emblem of the 70th anniversary Victory Day Parade

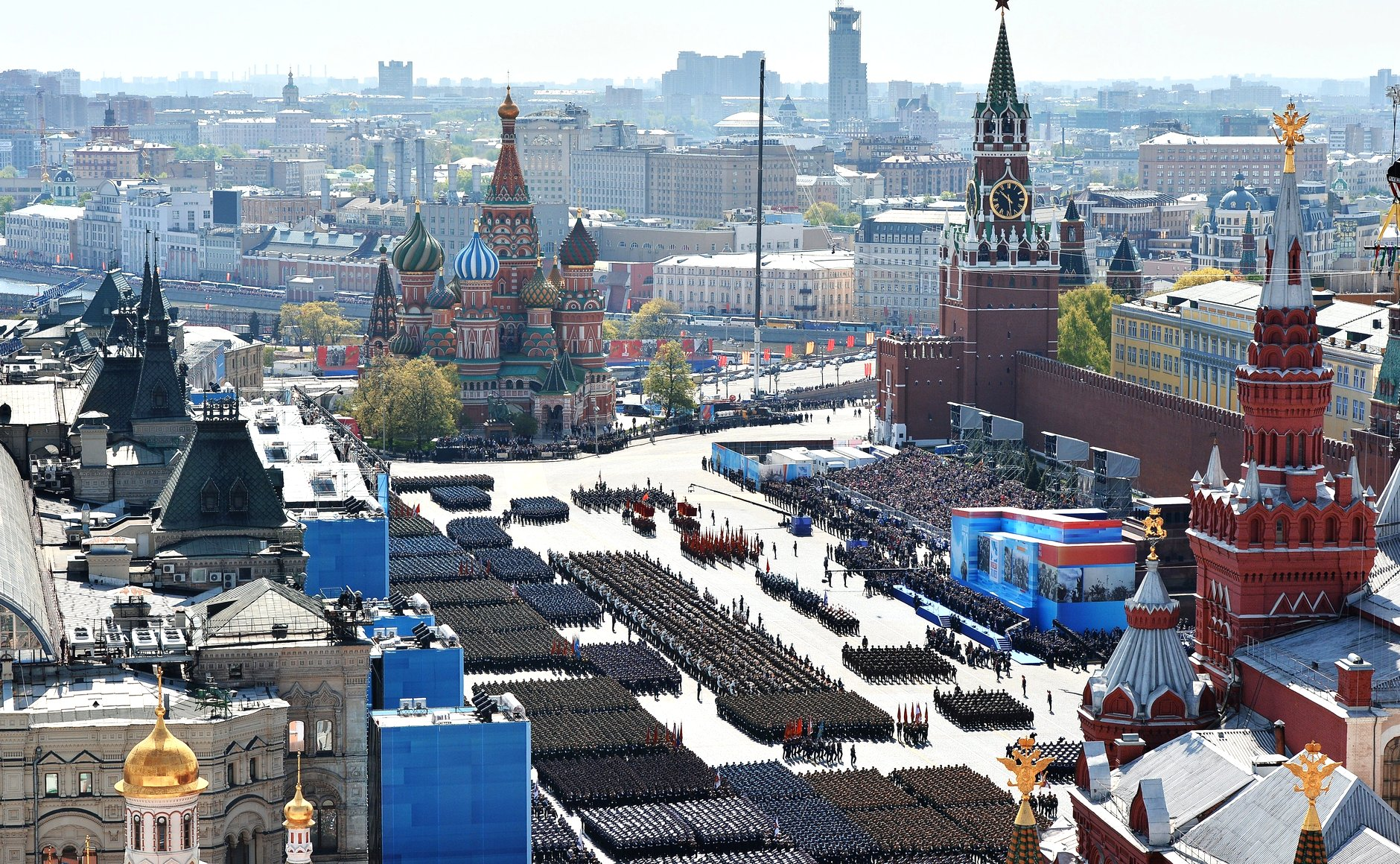
2015 Moscow Victory Day Parade is the biggest in record.

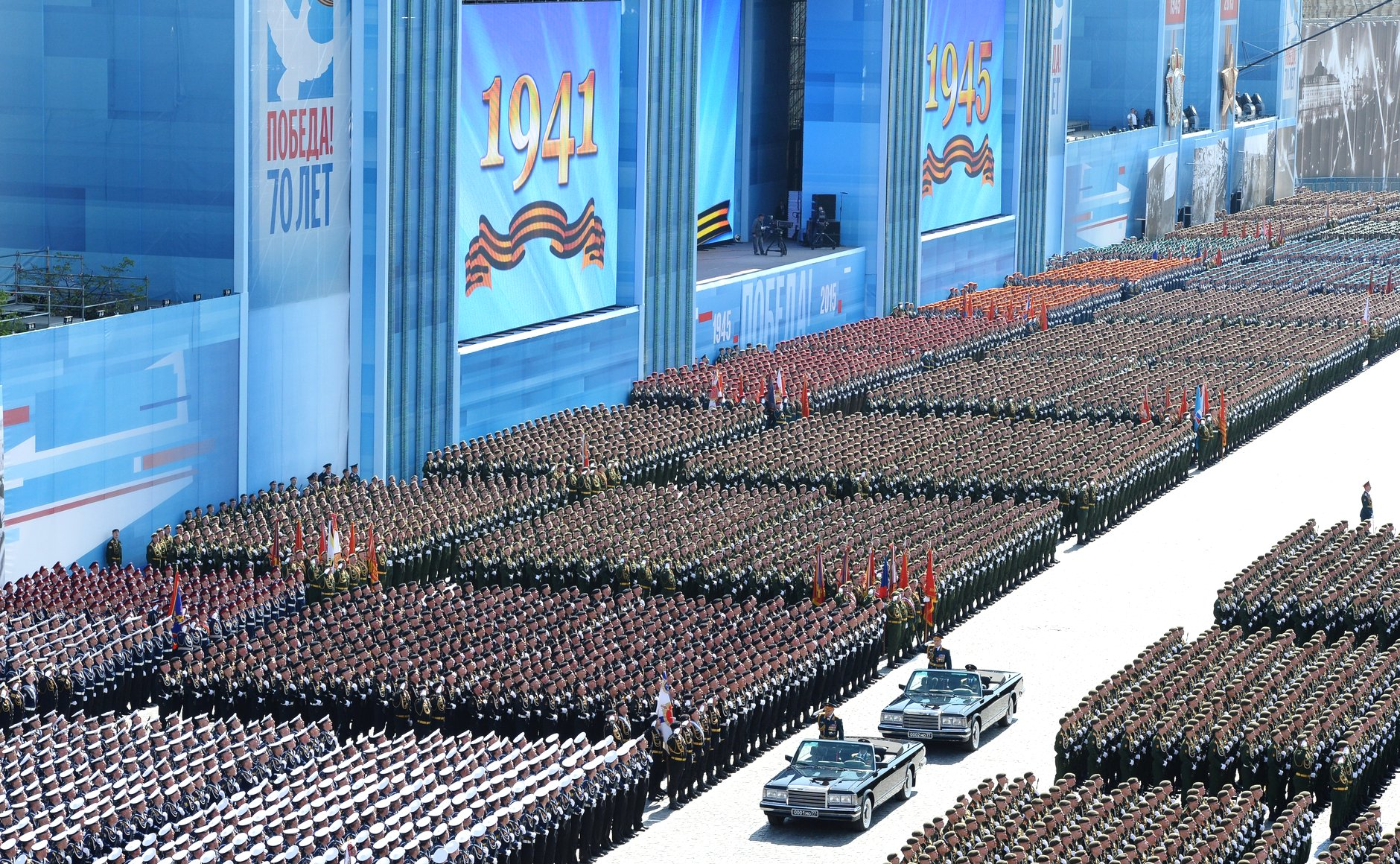
About 15,000 Soldiers at the 70th anniversary Victory Day Parade.

The 2015 Moscow Victory Day Parade was a parade that took place in Red Square in Moscow on 9 May 2015 to commemorate the 70th anniversary of the capitulation of Nazi Germany in 1945. The annual parade marks the Allied victory in the Second World War at the Eastern Front, on the same day as the signing of the German act of capitulation to the Allies in Berlin, at midnight of 9 May 1945 (Russian time). President of the Russian Federation Vladimir Putin delivered his twelfth holiday address to the nation on this day, right after the parade inspection that was presided by Minister of Defense General of the Army Sergey Shoygu.

Being a landmark jubilee parade honoring the 70th anniversary of the Allied victory in the European continent, the 2015 parade was the largest and most lavish held in Russian and Soviet history, but observers noted that a real cult of Victory had developed in Russia, Putin government used the celebration to legitimize its aggressive policy towards Ukraine (e.g., wide use of the St. George ribbon), most wartime allies in the Western world refused to attend the event, instead, the leaders of China and India, etc, were the major participants. Col. Gen. Oleg Salyukov, the Commander-in-Chief of the Russian Ground Forces, was the 2015 commander. In addition to troops of the Russian Federation, 1,300 troops from 10 foreign countries were also on parade, including contingents from China, India, Serbia, and Mongolia, all four countries making their first appearance at a Russian Victory Day parade.

Following the official parade, over 500,000 Russians and foreign attendees marched through central Moscow in commemoration of those who perished and those who survived World War II. The Moscow leg of this parade, which is an annual Victory Day tradition called the March of the Immortal Regiment and observed in numerous other Russian cities and in several other countries, was led by President Putin whose father served during the war. It is estimated that up to 12 million Russians participated nationwide in the 2015 March of the Immortal Regiment.

== Important dignitaries in attendance and parade information ==
Participants of the Victory Day parade 9 May 2015 versus 9 May 2010

=== Parade participants ===
- President of India, Pranab Mukherjee
- President of China and CCP General Secretary, Xi Jinping
- President of the State of Palestine Mahmoud Abbas
- President of the Republic of Cyprus, Nicos Anastasiades
- President of South Africa, Jacob Zuma
- President of Kazakhstan, Nursultan Nazarbayev
- President of Kyrgyzstan, Almazbek Atambayev
- President of Tajikistan, Emomali Rahmon
- President of Turkmenistan, Gurbanguly Berdimuhamedow
- President of Armenia, Serzh Sargsyan
- President of Azerbaijan, Ilham Aliyev
- President of Zimbabwe, Robert Mugabe
- Chairman of the Presidency of Bosnia and Herzegovina Mladen Ivanić
- President of Serbia, Tomislav Nikolić
- (North Macedonia) President of Macedonia, Gjorge Ivanov
- President of Mongolia, Tsakhiagiin Elbegdorj
- President of Vietnam, Trương Tấn Sang
- President of Cuba and PCC First Secretary, Raúl Castro
- President of Venezuela, Nicolas Maduro
- President of Egypt, Abdel Fattah el-Sisi
- United Nations Secretary General, Ban Ki-moon

=== Other participants ===
- President of the Czech Republic, Miloš Zeman (Note: Did not attend watching the military parade itself, only the official diplomatic reception and the commemoration act.)
- Prime Minister of Slovakia, Robert Fico (Note: Did not attend watching the military parade itself, only the official diplomatic reception and the commemoration act.)

In all, around 30 international leaders attended the parade, including heads of UNESCO and the Council of Europe, with invitations having been sent to 68 heads of state. The UK was represented by the grandson of World War II leader British Prime Minister Winston Churchill, Nicholas Soames. A number of EU countries including the Czech Republic, Hungary and Greece came under US and/or EU pressure not to attend the Victory Day Parade due to the 2014 annexation of Crimea by the Russian Federation and the subsequent War in Donbas, resulting in Czech President Miloš Zeman subsequently banning the US ambassador from functions at Prague Castle. A number of World War II veterans from the US and UK were present at the victory day celebrations as private attendees.

The following countries opted not to participate in this year's parade in Moscow, although most sent their respective ambassadors as part of the diplomatic corps: Australia, Belarus (which held its own victory day celebrations on the same day), Belgium, United Kingdom, Germany, Georgia, Israel, Canada, Latvia, Lithuania, Luxembourg, Moldova, Netherlands, Norway, Poland, Slovakia, Slovenia, Ukraine, United States, Finland, Croatia, Montenegro, Czech Republic, Sweden, Estonia, Japan.

The 2014 annexation of Crimea by the Russian Federation and the subsequent War in Donbas has caused a number of nations that fought in the second world war, especially those that participated in the parade of 2010, to not participate in the 2015 celebrations, including Germany, whose chancellor Angela Merkel instead visited Moscow on 10 May to lay a wreath at the Tomb of the Unknown Soldier and meet with Vladimir Putin. Until three days after the Victory Day parade, US secretary of state John Kerry laid a wreath at the Tomb of the Unknown Soldier in Sochi with Russian foreign minister Sergey Lavrov.

Aside from the return of the T-34 tank and the SU-100 self-propelled gun, and the usual vehicles and planes in the mobile column and the flypast, making their parade debut this year were the following:

- Bumerang armored personnel carrier
- Kurganets-25 infantry fighting vehicle
- T-15 heavy IFV
- T-14 main battle tank
- 2S35 Koalitsiya-SV self-propelled howitzer
- Ural Typhoon MRAP
- BTR-82AM Naval Infantry armored personnel carrier
- Kornet-D/EM mobile antitank missile system mounted on the GAZ Tigr APC
- RS-24 Yars mobile ICBM launcher
- The brand new Crimean Wings (Krilya Tavrida) aerobatic team with 4 Yakovlev Yak-130s
- Sukhoi Su-30 and Sukhoi Su-35 fighter jets

The Nakhimov Higher Naval Institute and the Chemical Defense and Control Military Academy both made their return appearances in a Red Square parade after years of absences, the former since 1985 and the latter since 2006, while the Pacific Naval Institute will be making its debut appearance this year, all in the march past segment made up of 16,000 servicemen, where they will be joined by a company-sized formation from the Ground Forces Military Institute from the Kazakh Ground Forces, part of the Armed Forces of the Republic of Kazakhstan, and several military contingents from other Commonwealth of Independent States member countries, including the Armenian Army and the Azerbaijani Land Forces, all returning to the parade after a 5-year break, alongside first time parade participants from the armed forces of Serbia, China, Mongolia, and India. The BMD-4 infantry fighting vehicle will make its return to the mobile column after a 6-year break, together with the joint flight of the Russian aerobatics teams Russian Knights and Strizhi after a one-year absence from the parade.

Also, several military vehicles that drove through the Red Square in the 1945 Victory Parade are being readied for their drivepast in other major Russian cities.

As per tradition, 26 other Russian major cities (Sevastopol and Kerch in the disputed Crimea included) held their parades, and joint civil-military parades were hosted by 50 other towns and cities nationwide, plus 5 fleet reviews in Saint Petersburg and Kaliningrad (Baltic Fleet), Sevastopol (Black Sea), Severnomorsk (Northern) and Vladivostok (Pacific). Some of the big parades featured an air fly past for the first time.

Victory Day parades and celebrations were also held in the following CIS member nations:

- (Belarus) : 9 May (Minsk, featuring the military band of the United States Air Forces in Europe - Air Forces Africa, Brest)
- (Ukraine) : 9 May (Kyiv, Kharkiv, Odesa)
- (Kazakhstan) : 7 May (Astana)
- (Kyrgyzstan) : 9 May (Bishkek)
- (Armenia) : 9 May (Yerevan)
- (Azerbaijan) : 9 May (Baku)
- (Tajikistan) : 9 May (Dushanbe)

The self-proclaimed Donetsk People's Republic of Novorossiya, in the midst of the fighting in the Donbas, held on 9 May in Donetsk the first public Victory Day parade of the so-called "United Armed Forces of Novorossiya" (military branch of the separatist organisation) together with the federal level Ministries of Internal Affairs and Emergency Situations. The situation was the same in the other non-recognised entity within Ukraine, Luhansk People's Republic, where on 9 May Luhansk's first ever Victory Day parade was held, with participation of the United Armed Forces of Novorossiya and the federal MVD and EMERCOM units of the entity.

The Nagorno-Karabakh Republic celebrated the day with a parade and other activities in Stepanakert on 9 May, also celebrating the 23rd anniversary of the Capture of Shusha during the First Nagorno-Karabakh War. Due to the ongoing Nagorno-Karabakh conflict, and the fact that immediately after the parade formation of Azerbaijan was the contingent from Armenia, a photograph of the parade on the website of the Ministry of Defense of Azerbaijan photoshopped the Flag of Armenia from the official parade picture.

== Preparation ==
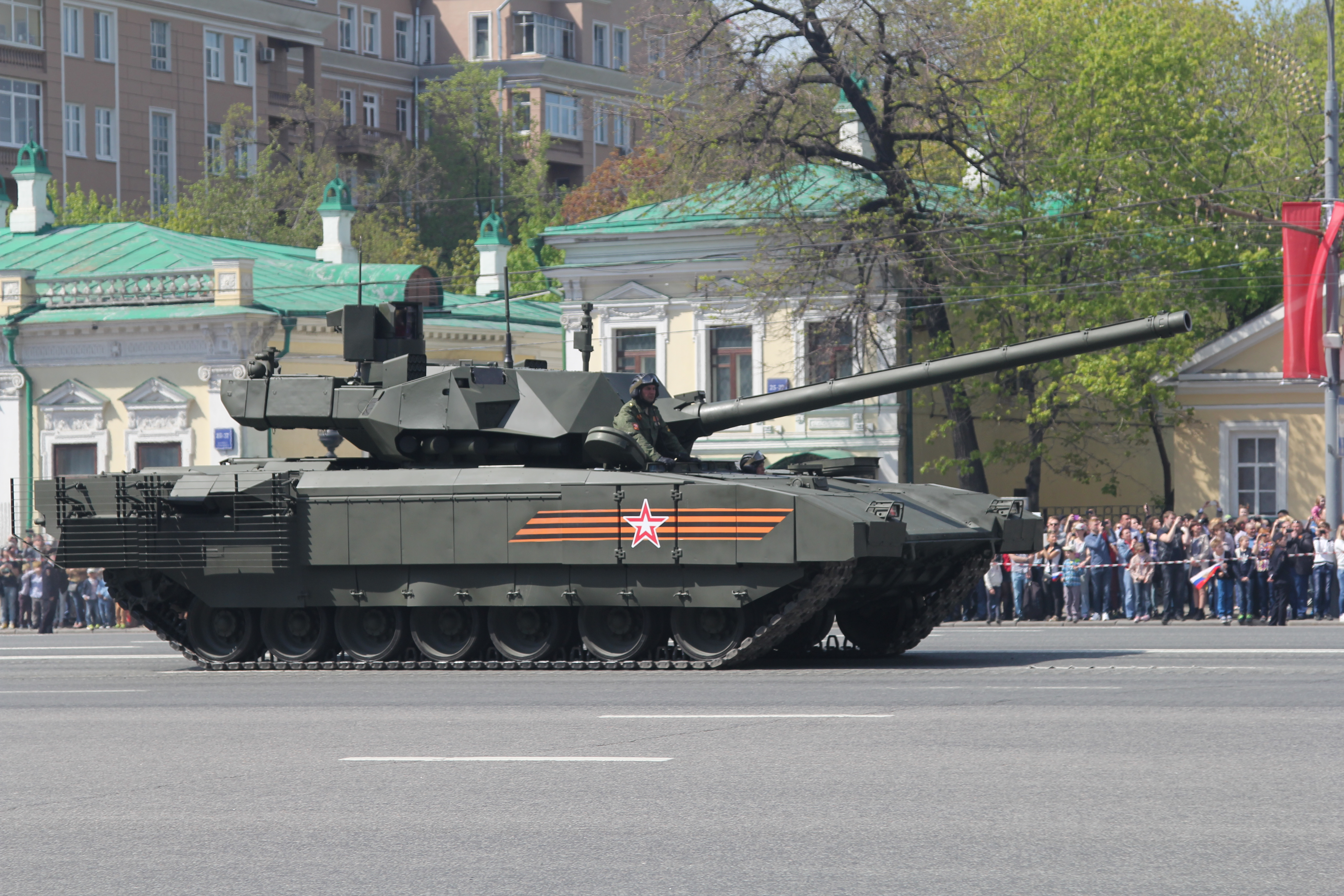
T-14 Armata Tank in the 2015 Moscow Victory Day Parade

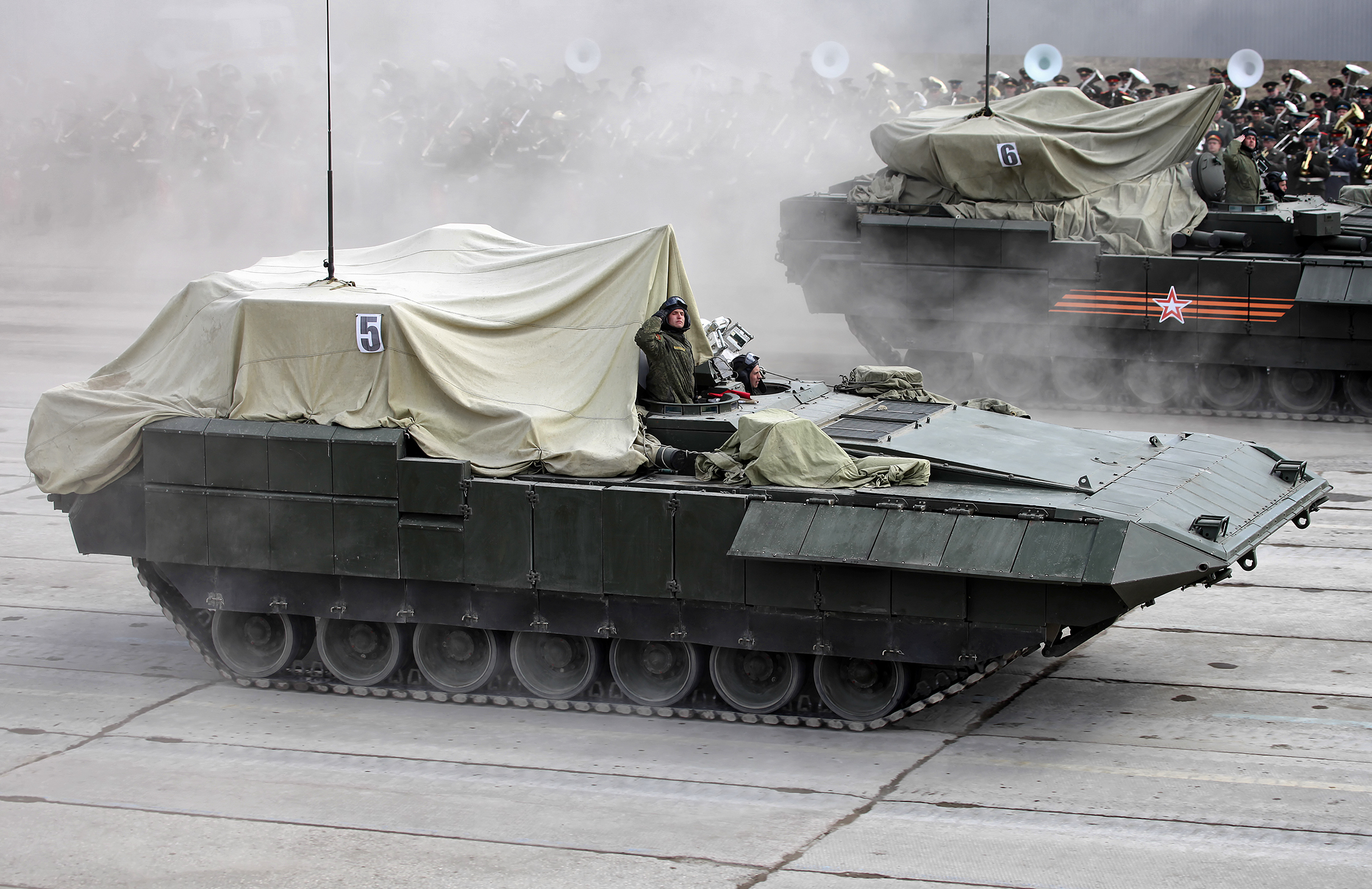
T-15 and Kurganets-25 during a rehearsal for the parade with covered turrets

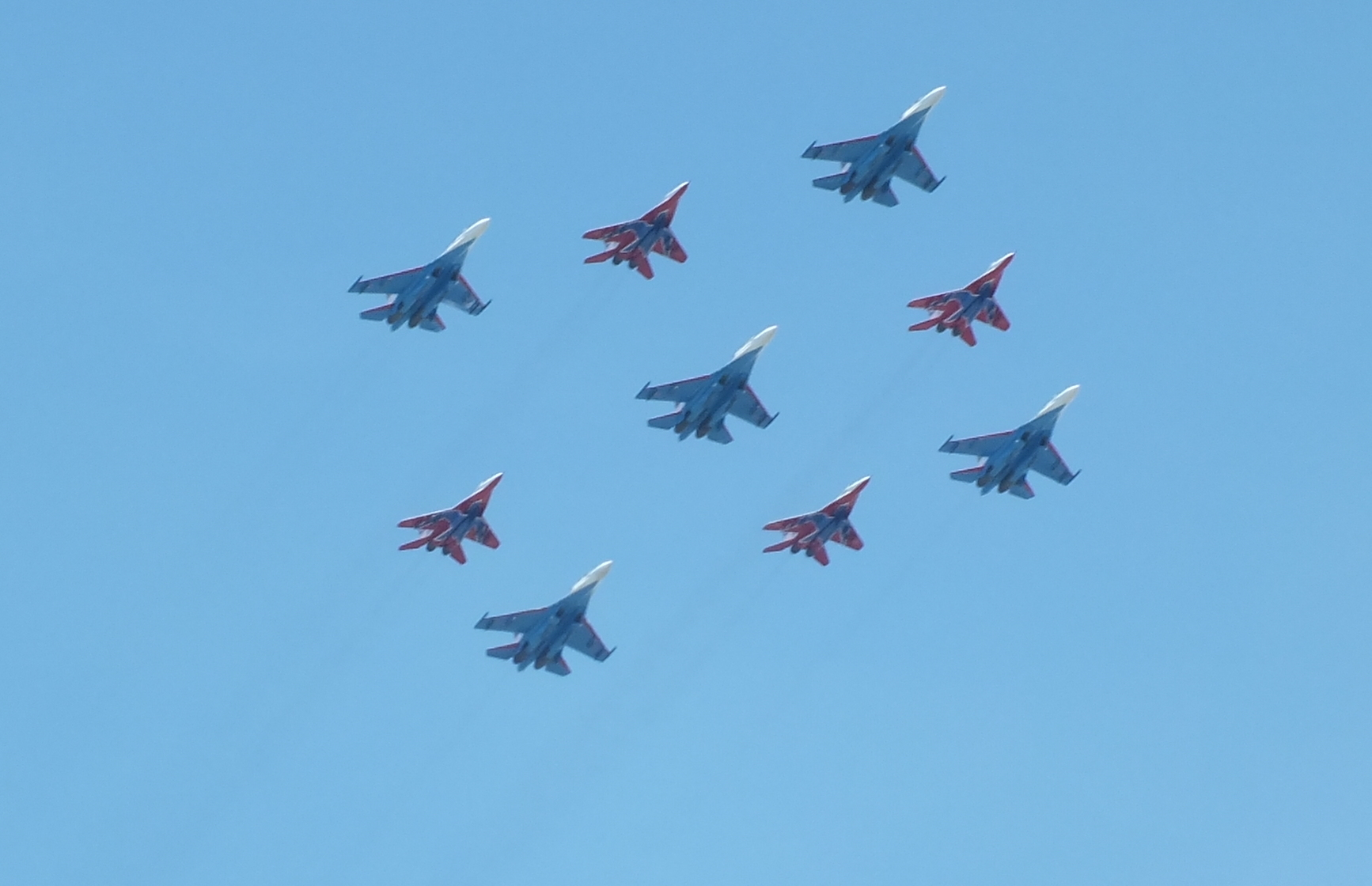
Aircraft flypast ("Russian Knights" and "Strizhi") over Moscow on 7 May

Beginning in November/December 2014, preparations for the parade were well attended at the unit level. Individual unit practices were held in the various military installations for all the participating units, and by March 2015, the air flypast column began its individual practice flying runs. Also rehearsing for the parade are the massed military bands of the Armed Forces, the MVD, EMERCOM and the Moscow Garrison, all to be conducted for the 13th straight year by Lieutenant General Valery Khalilov, the Senior Director of Music of the Bands Service of the Russian Armed Forces since 2002, with a combined number of more than a thousand military bandsmen, and the world-famous Corps of Drums of the Moscow Military Music College "Field Marshal Alexander Suvorov", under the leadership of Colonel Alexander Gerasimov, the long-time college director, which has always (with a brief break from 2009 to 2011) had the privilege of leading the parade.

The parade practice runs officially commenced in the practice field at Alabino, Moscow Oblast, in April 2015, and will last until the middle of April when the runs on Red Square itself will start, ending with a final general combined practice run of the parade in early May. Before the first parade dry run, there was the first practice drivepast of the estimated 200 mobile column vehicles in attendance this year, that first drivepast was held on 27 March.

The first parade practice run on 3 April 2015 kicked off officially the preparation for the big parade, despite the snowy weather that day. Joining the first run-through rehearsal (for the march past segment and the mobile column only) was the first ever military women's contingent to march on Red Square for the very first time, composed of girl Cadet Corps students coming from the Moscow National Pensions School. This was followed by the first test run of the flypast column in the Alabino training grounds on 9 April, with the more than 150 aircraft taking part in that first run-through of the flypast segment.

The 15 2 April parade practice run witnessed the first practice march of a Cossacks contingent that on 9 May will be the first ever unit of its kind to march on the steps of Red Square after so many years. The unit marching for this year comes from the ranks of the Kuban Cossacks, which marched past Red Square in the Victory Parade of 1945 represented by the 4th Guards Cossack Cavalry Regiment. The 2nd dry run for the flypast was done on 21 April, and the final run on the Alabino grounds on 22 April.

The first late night practice run started on 29 April in Moscow's Red Square, and continued on till 4 May with the final two practice runs on 6 and 7 May, which also serve as the general practice runs, the one on 7 May expected to have Col. Gen. Salyukov leading the marchers on Red Square and General of the Army Shoygu inspecting, just as they would be doing in the actual parade in 2 days time (the final rehearsal, just as the actual parade would be, was scheduled to be held at around 10AM Moscow Daylight Time). All of them are open to the general public, with the 7 May final practice run being open also for war veterans. At the same time, final practice runs are being made for those joining the parades on 9 May in 26 other major cities in Russia plus 50 other towns and cities. During such practice drill runs in Moscow several variants of the new Russian armored vehicle platform Armata were seen with turrets covered, together with the Bumerang APC and the Kurgarnets-25 IFV's turrets, which got the same treatment as well till the turret covers were removed for the 3 – 4 May practice runs. During the 7 May general practice run one of the T-14 Armata tanks stopped in the middle of the square because of driver's mistake, right in front of the people in attendance. There was also one incident with a T-15 APC which could drive on the platform only after the second attempt.

All the 145 aircraft taking part in the flypast took their practice run on 5 May that drew a great reception from the crowds in Red Square, Manege Square and Tver Street that watched the dry run.

== Full order of the 2015 Victory Day Parade ==
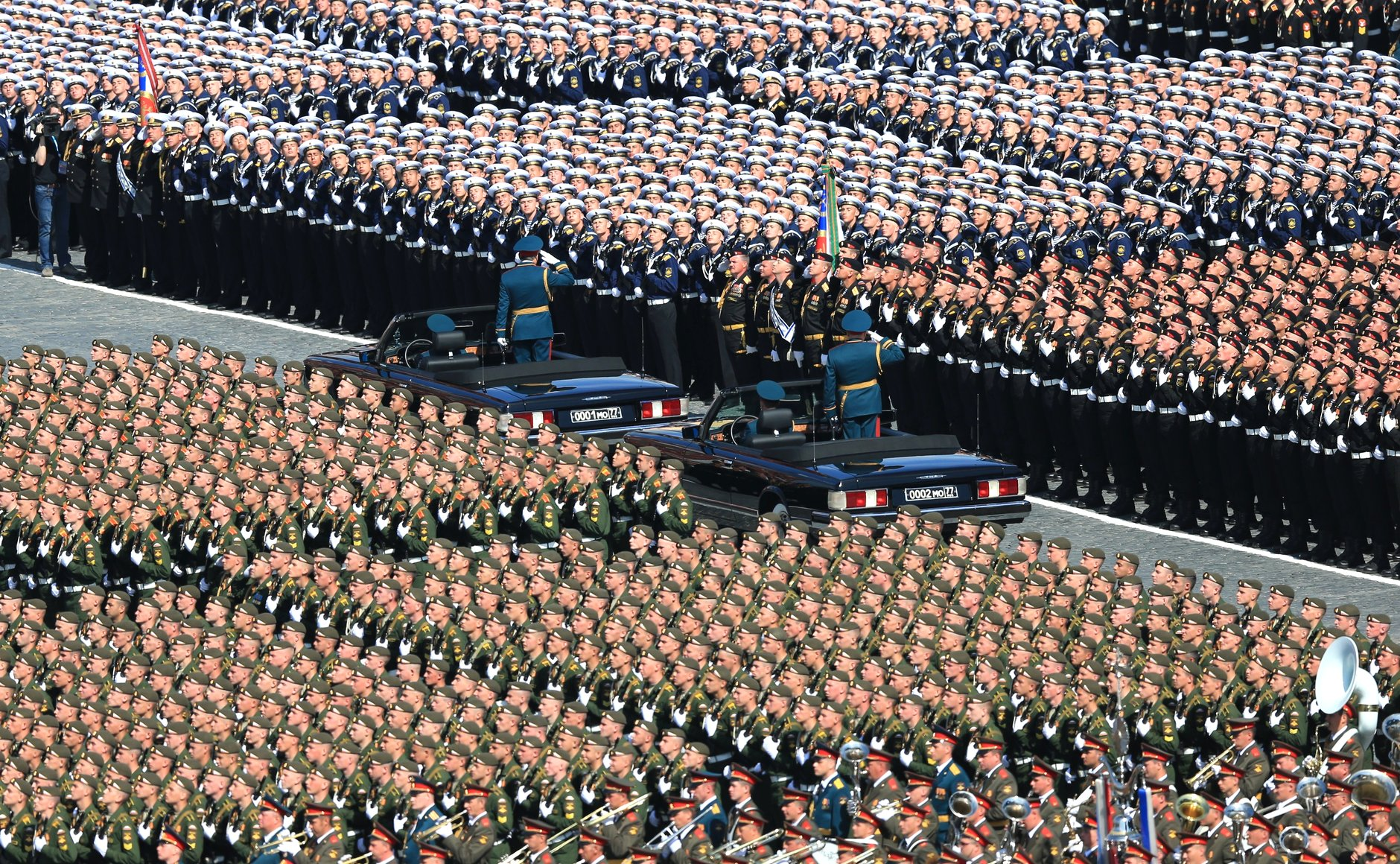
Rows of personnel from the Russian Navy, Marines, and Ground Forces

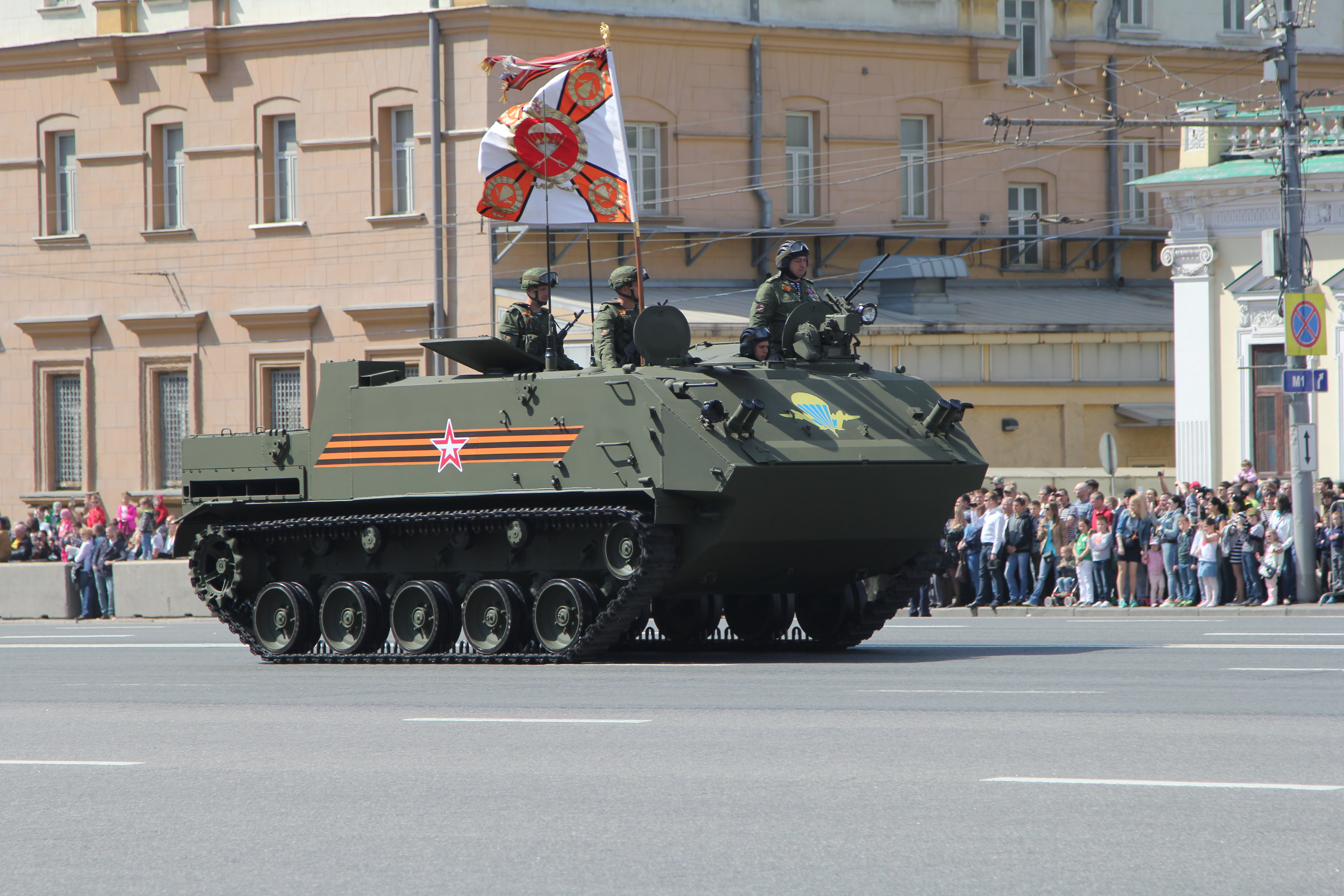
Russian Airborne BTR-MD "Rakushka"

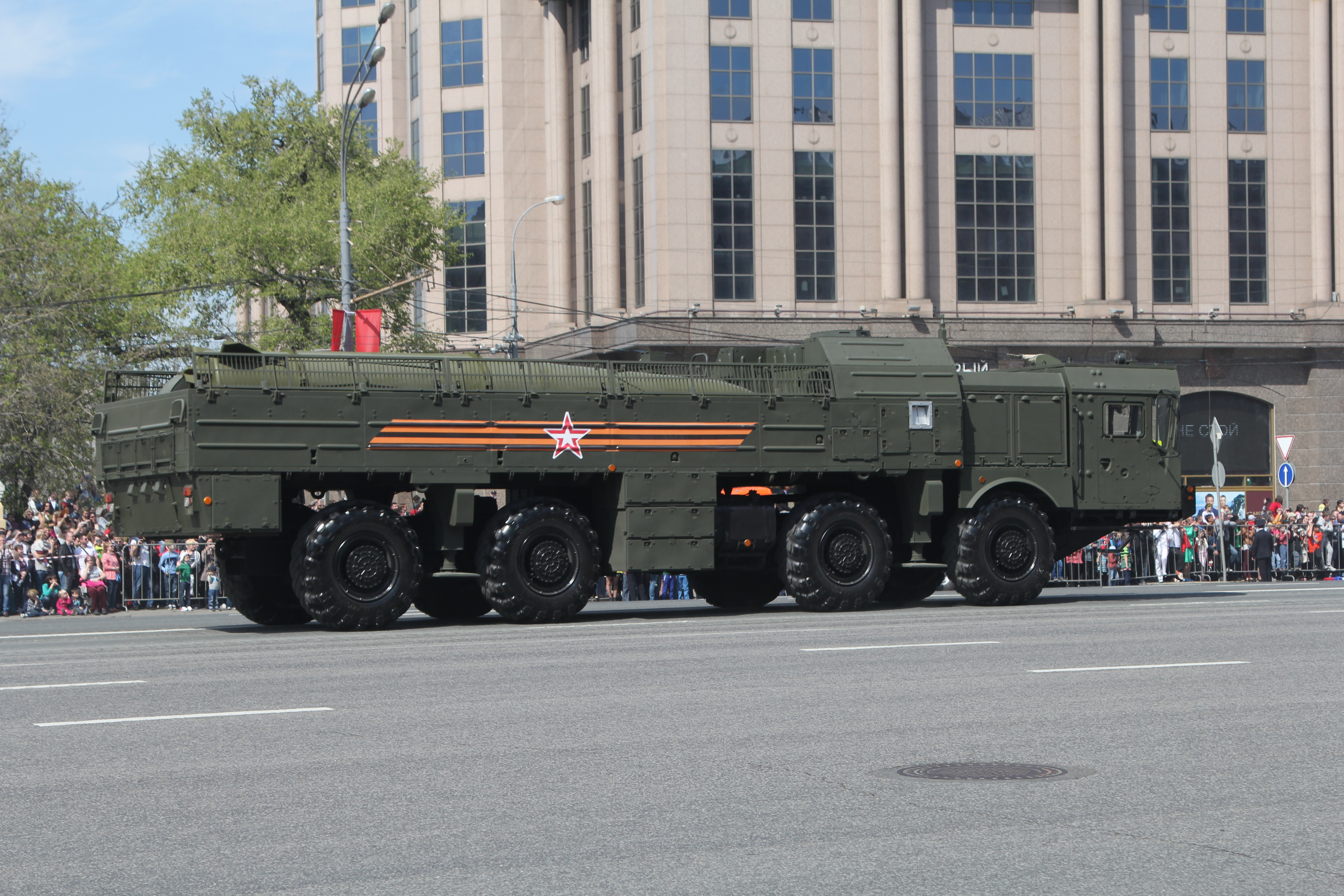
9K720 Iskander

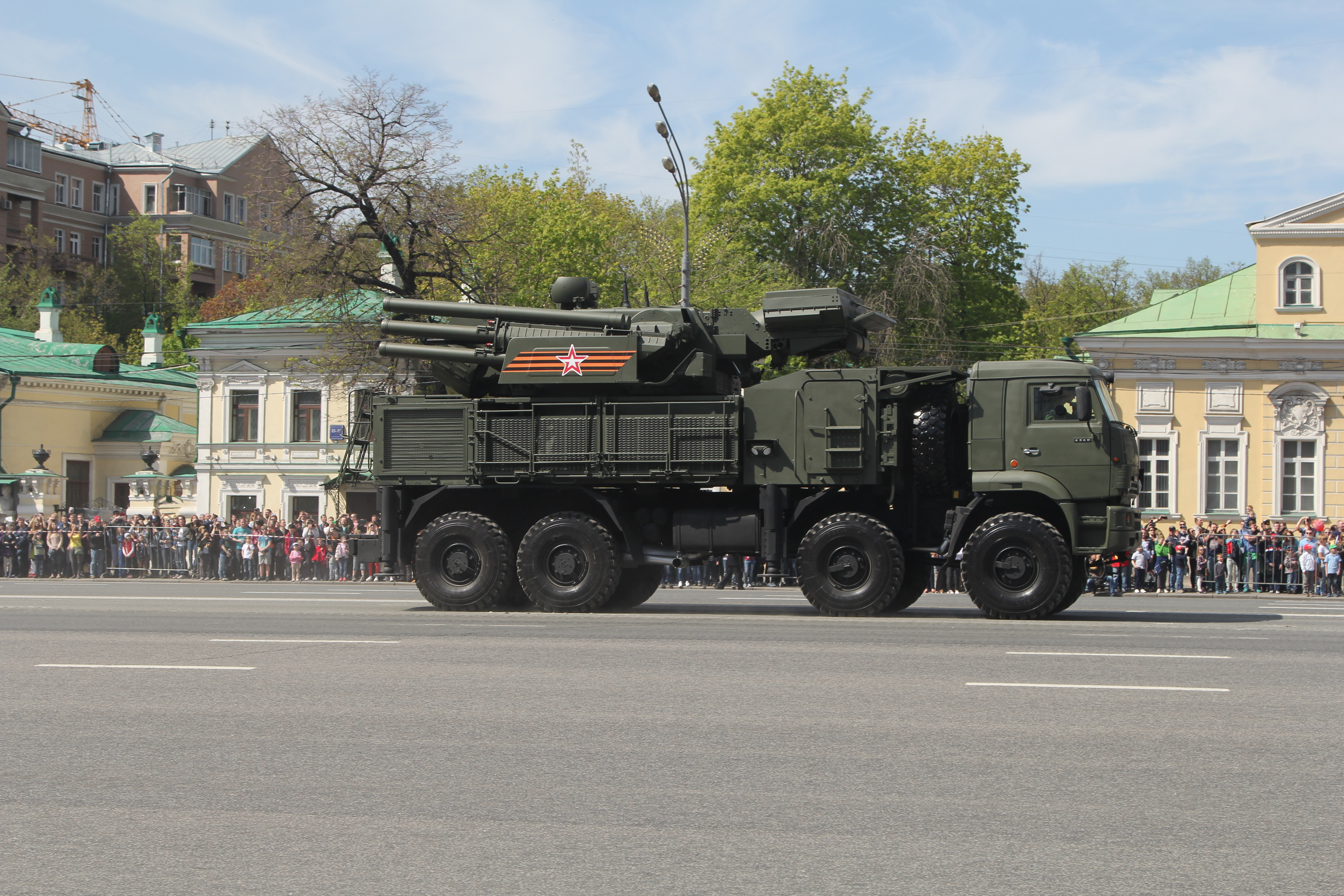
Pantsir-S1

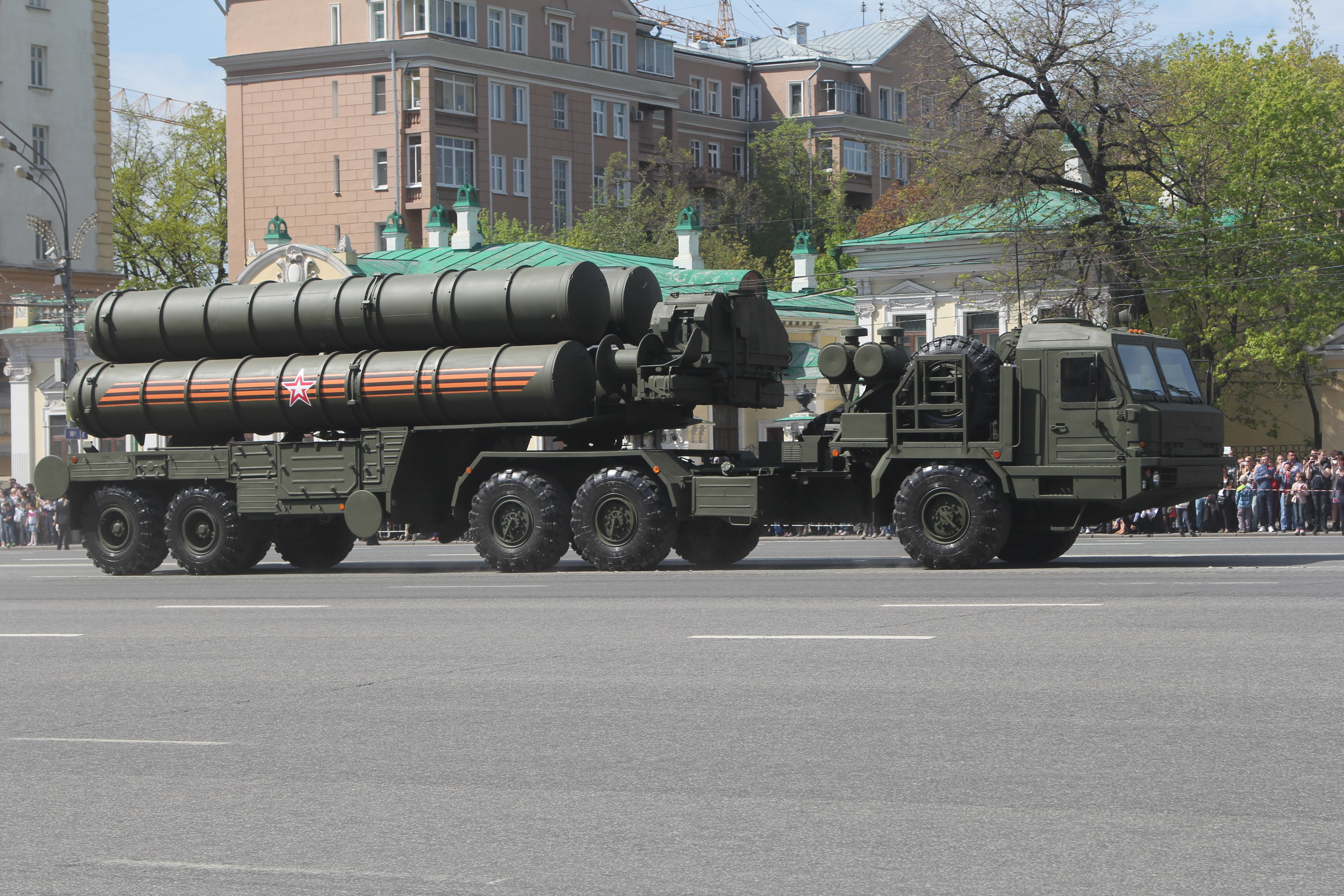
S-400 (missile)

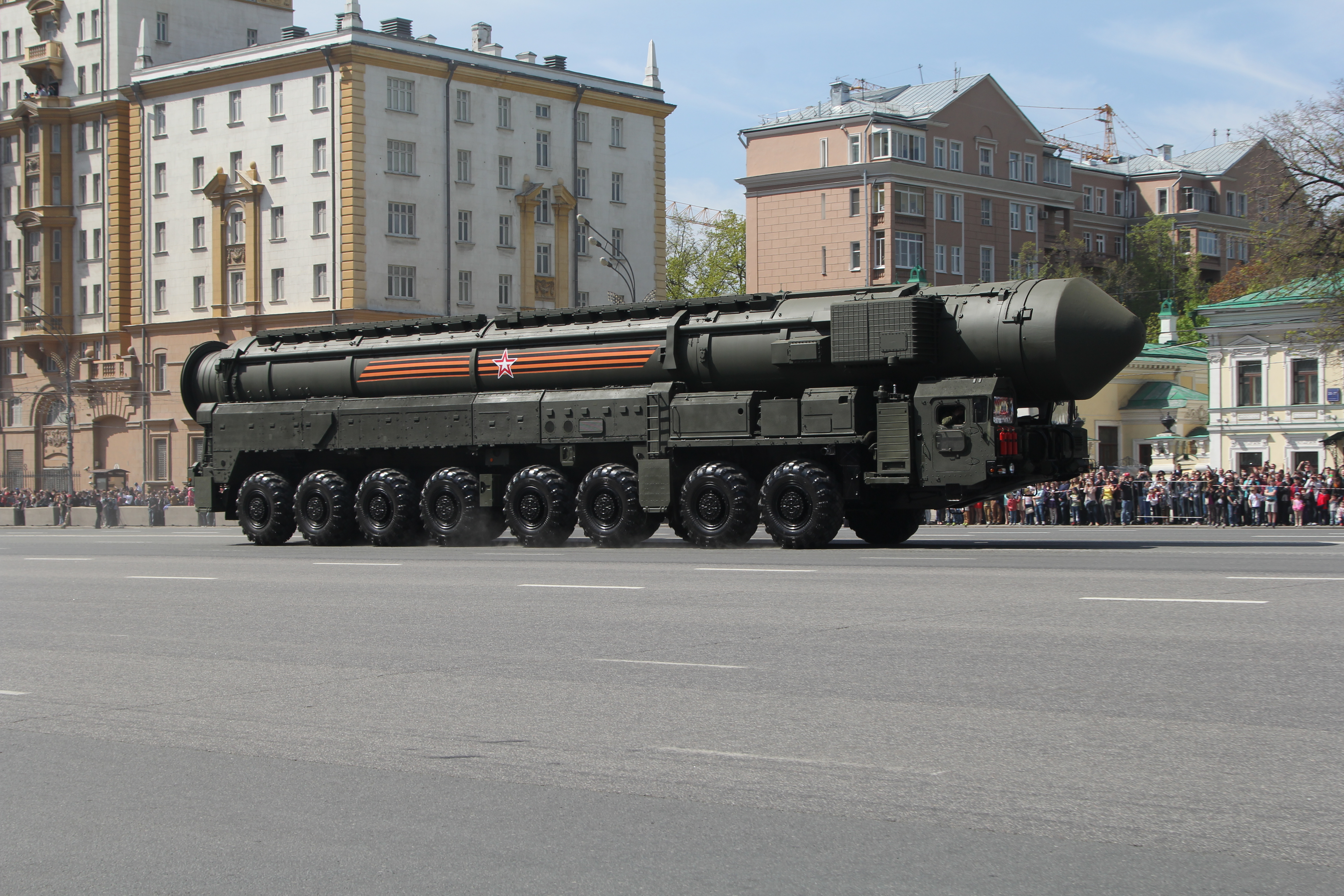
RS-24 Yars

Bold indicates first appearance, italic indicates multiple appearances, Bold and italic indicate returning appearance, all indicated unless otherwise noted.

- General of the Army Sergey Shoigu, Minister of Defense of the Russian Federation (parade inspector)
- Colonel General Oleg Salyukov, Commander-in-Chief of the Russian Ground Forces (parade commander)

=== Military Bands ===
- Massed Military Bands of the Armed Forces under the direction of the Senior Director of Music of the Military Bands Service of the Armed Forces of the Russian Federation, Lieutenant General Valery Khalilov
- Corps of Drums of the Moscow Military Music School

=== Infantry Column ===
- 154th Preobrazhensky Independent Commandant's Regiment Colour Guard
- Front standards and historical colours
- Honour Guard Company of the 1st Honor Guard Battalion, 154th PICR
- Historical units
  - Infantrymen
  - Pilots
  - Sailors
  - Sappers
  - Reconnaissance
  - Militiamen
  - **Battalion of the Kuban Cossacks** (first appearance)
  - Presidential Cavalry Escort Battalion, Kremlin Regiment
- Foreign contingents on parade, in the order of their appearance
  - Special Forces of Azerbaijan
  - Separate Regiment of Protection, Armed Forces of Armenia
  - 5th Spetsnaz Brigade of the Armed Forces of Belarus
  - (Kazakhstan) Military Institute of the Kazakh Ground Forces
  - National Guard of Kyrgyzstan
  - Military Institute of the Ministry of Defense of Tajikistan
  - (India) **The Grenadiers, Indian Army** (first appearance)
  - (Mongolia) **Mongolian State Honor Guard** (first appearance)
  - (Serbia) **Serbian Guards Unit** (first appearance)
  - (China) **Beijing Capital Garrison Honor Guard Battalion, Beijing Military Region, People's Liberation Army** (first appearance)
- Suvorov Military School
- Nakhimov Naval School
- **Moscow National Pensions School Cadet Corps** (first appearance)
- Kronstadt Sea Cadet Corps
- Aksanskiy Cossack Cadet Corps
- Combined Arms Academy of the Armed Forces of the Russian Federation
- Military University of the Ministry of Defense of the Russian Federation
- Military Academy of Material and Technical Security "General of the Army A. V. Khrulev"
- Zhukovsky – Gagarin Air Force Academy
- Baltic Naval Military Institute "Admiral Fyodor Ushakov"
- **Black Sea Higher Naval Military Institute "Admiral Pavel Nakhimov"** (returning)
- **Pacific Naval Military Institute "Admiral Stepan Makarov"** (first appearance)
- 336th Independent Guards Biaystok Marine Brigade of the Baltic Fleet
- Peter the Great Military Academy of the Strategic Missile Forces
- Military Space Academy "Alexander Mozhaysky"
- **Yaroslavl Air Defense Rocket Training School** (returning)
- Ryazan Higher Airborne Command School "Gen. of the Army Vasily Margelov"'
- 98th Guards Airborne Division
  - 331st Guards Parachute Regiment
  - 217th Guards Parachute Regiment
- 29th and 38th Independent Railway Brigades of the Russian Railway Troops
- **Engineering Forces, Nuclear, Biological and Chemical Defence and Control Military Academy "Marshal of the Soviet Union Semyon Timoshenko"** (returning)
- **1st NBC Defense Brigade** (first appearance)
- ODON Ind. Motorized Internal Troops Division of the Ministry of Internal Affairs of the Russian Federation "Felix Dzerzhinsky"
- Civil Defense Academy of the Ministry of Emergency Situations
- Moscow Border Guards Institute of the Border Guard Service of the Federal Security Service of the Russian Federation "Moscow City Council"
- 2nd Guards Tamanskaya Motor Rifle Division "Mikhail Kalinin"
- 4th Guards Kantemirovskaya Tank Division "Yuri Andropov"
- Military Technical University of the Federal Agency for Special Construction
- Moscow Military Commanders Training School "Supreme Soviet of Russia"

=== Mobile Column (in order of appearance) ===
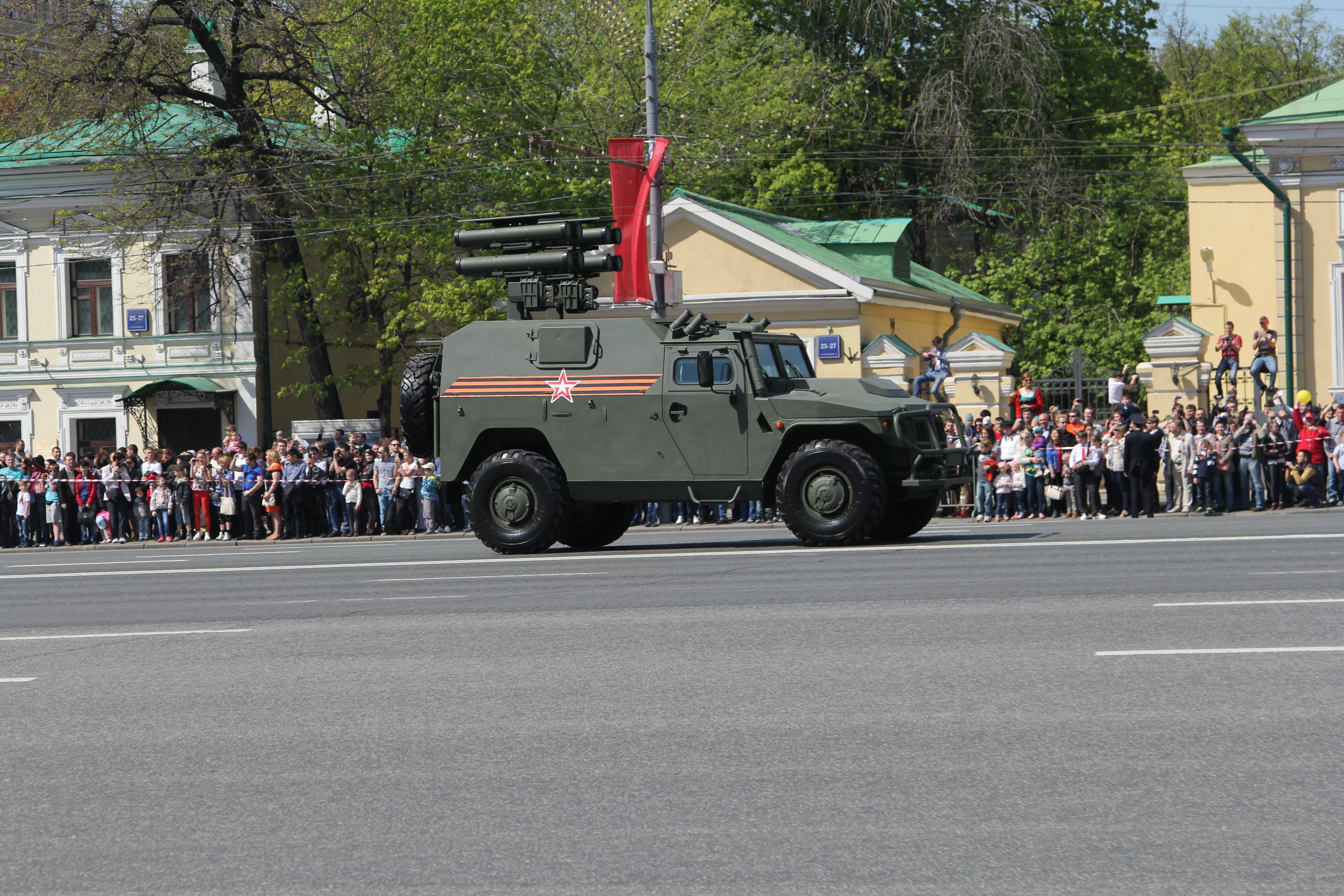
Kornet D

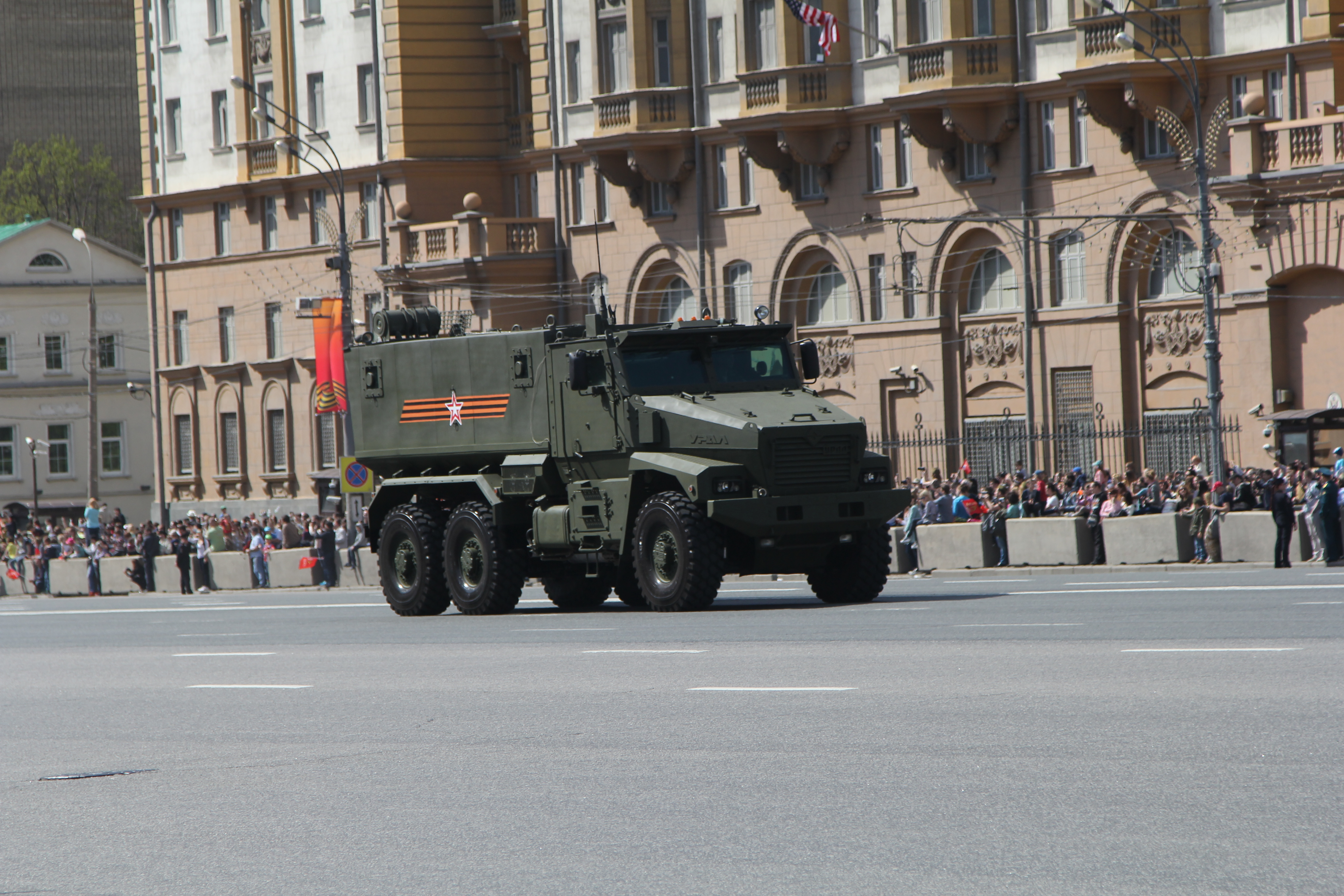
Ural Typhoon

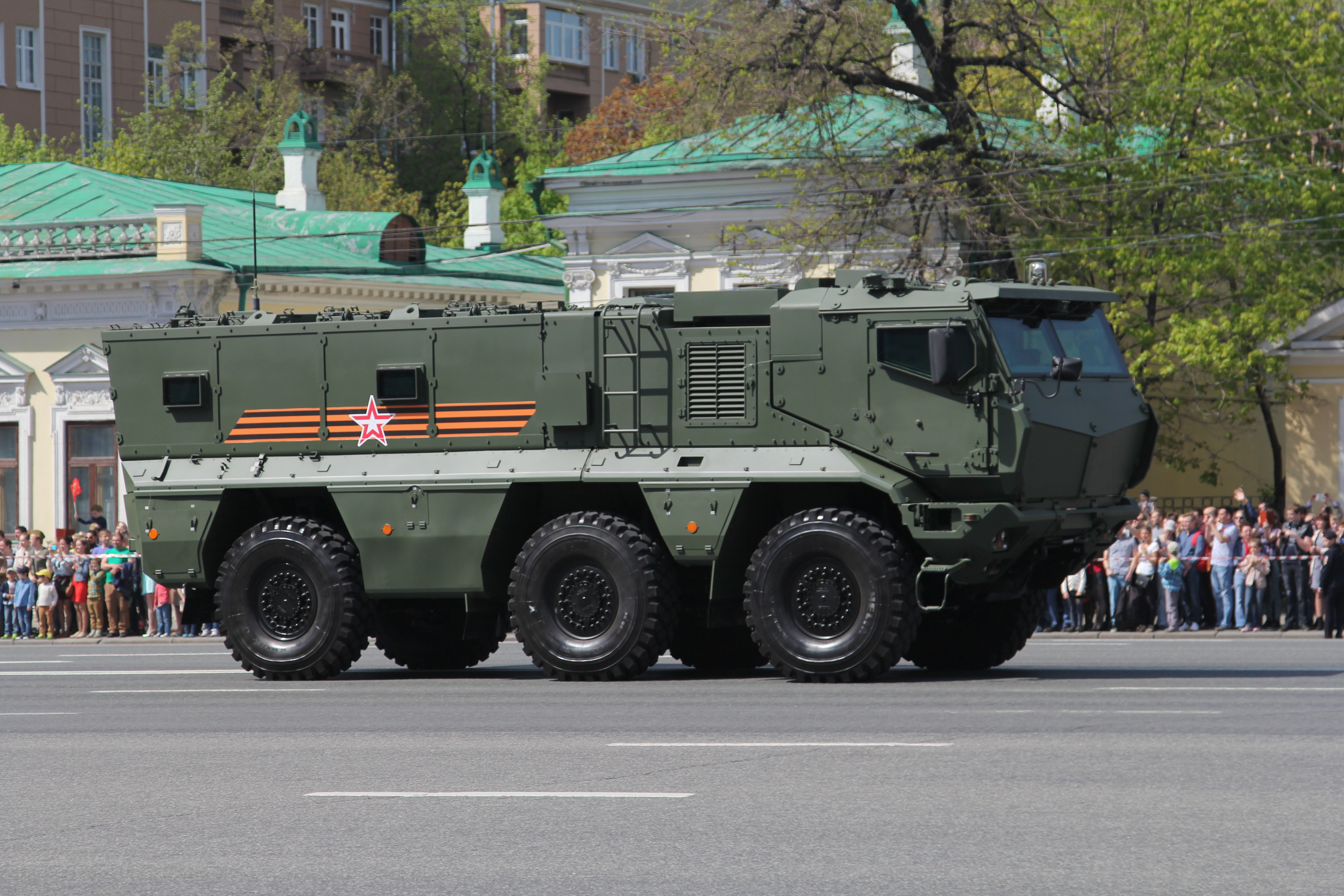
Kamaz Typhoon

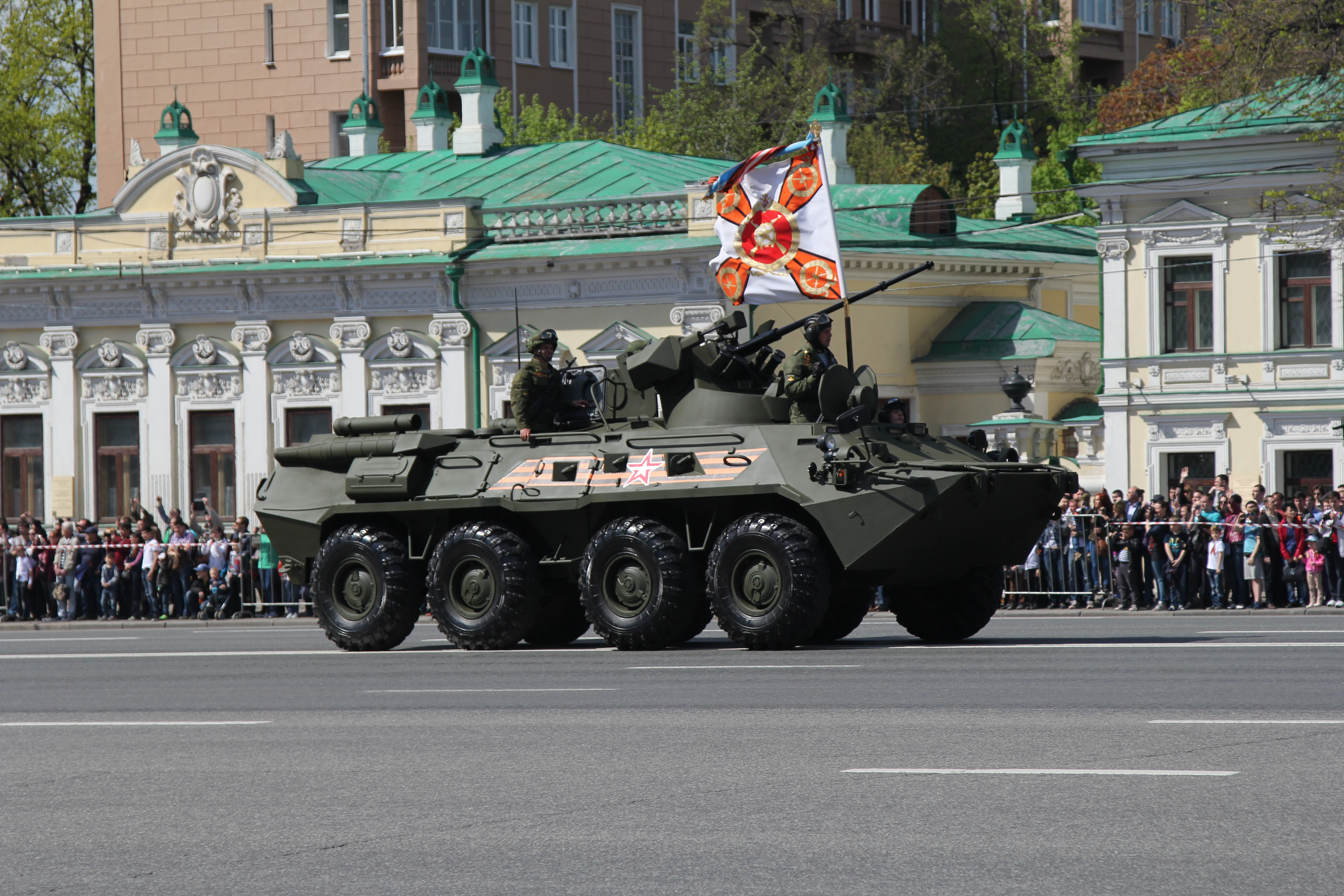
BTR-82A

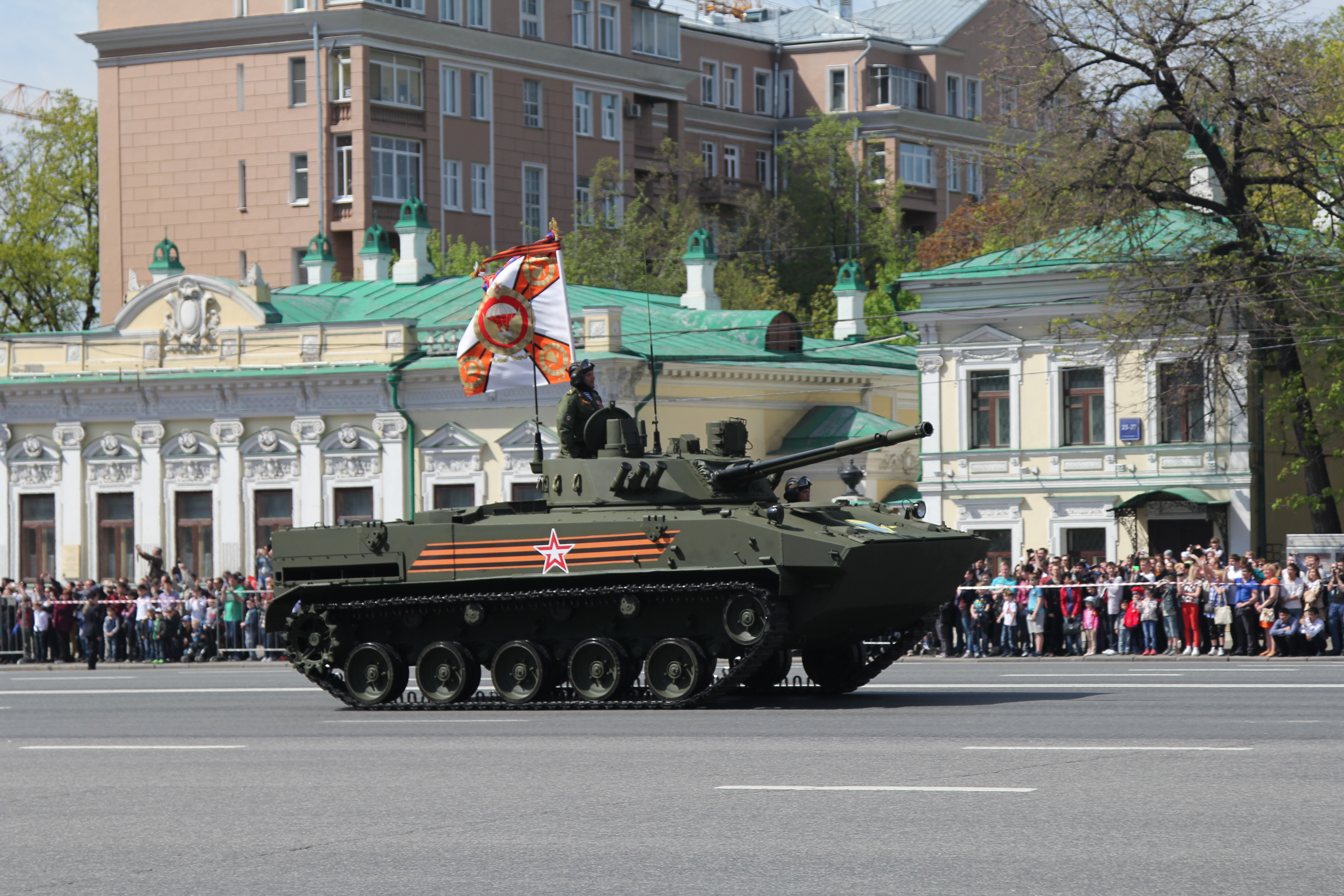
BMD-4M

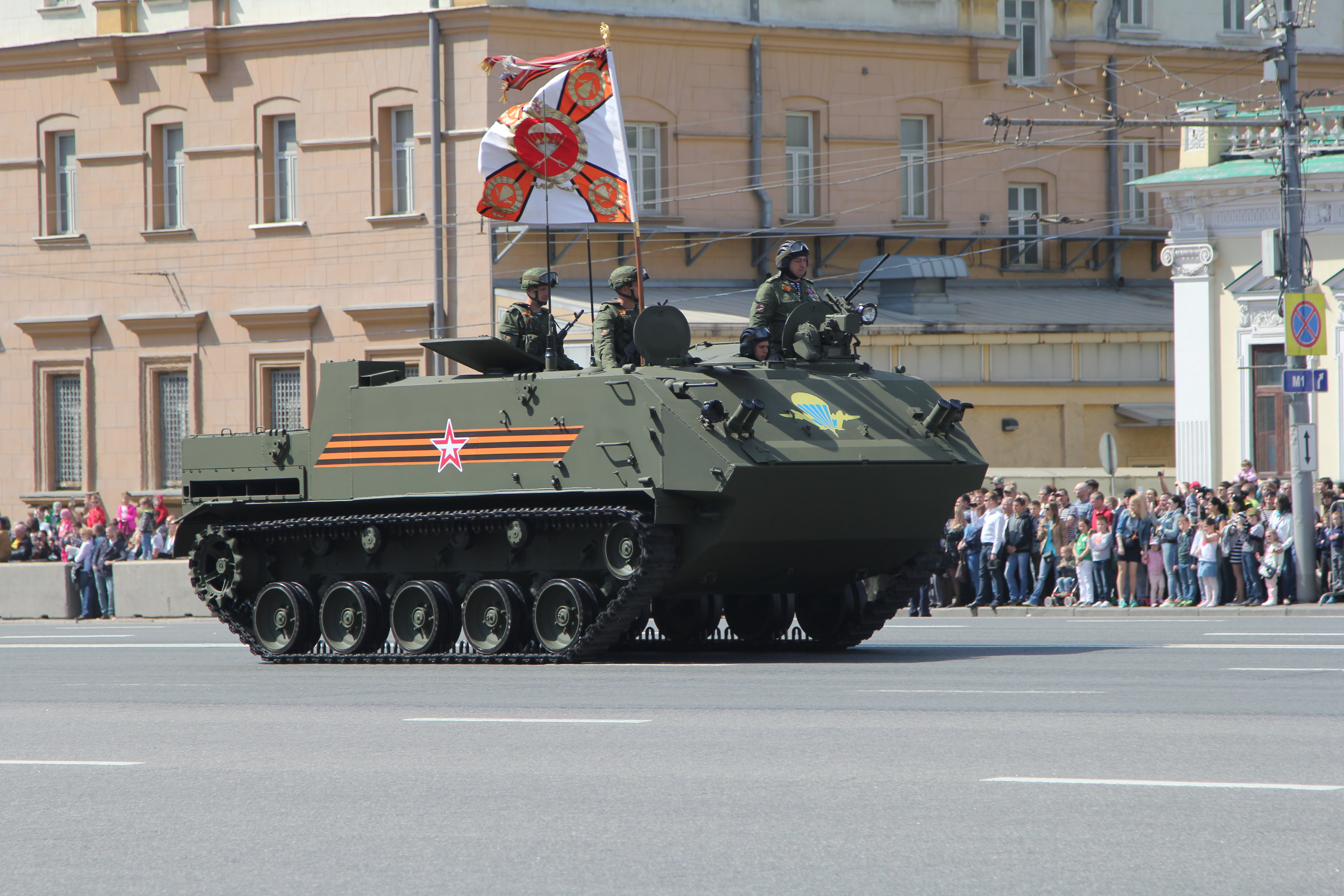
BTR-MDM "Rakushka"

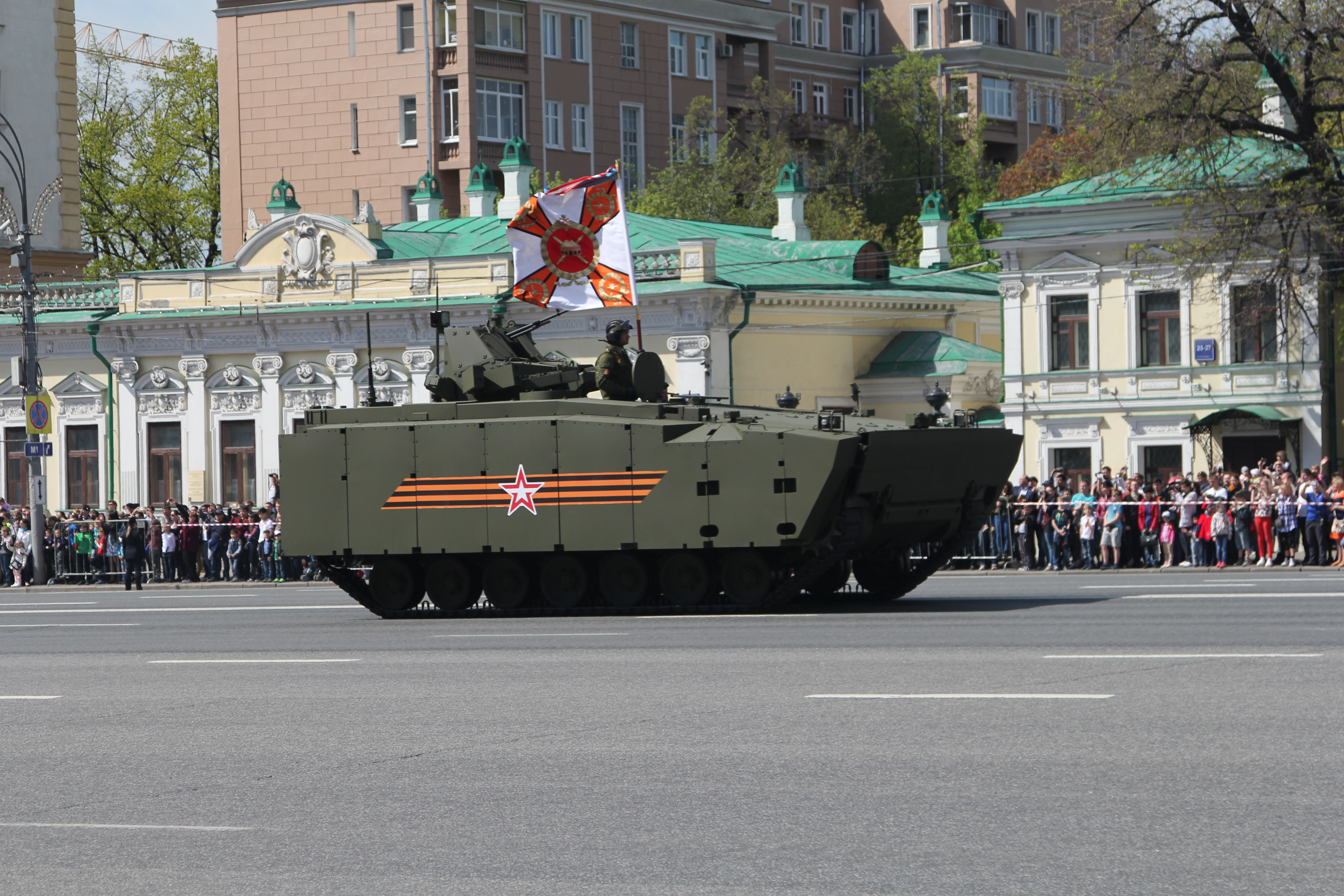
B-10

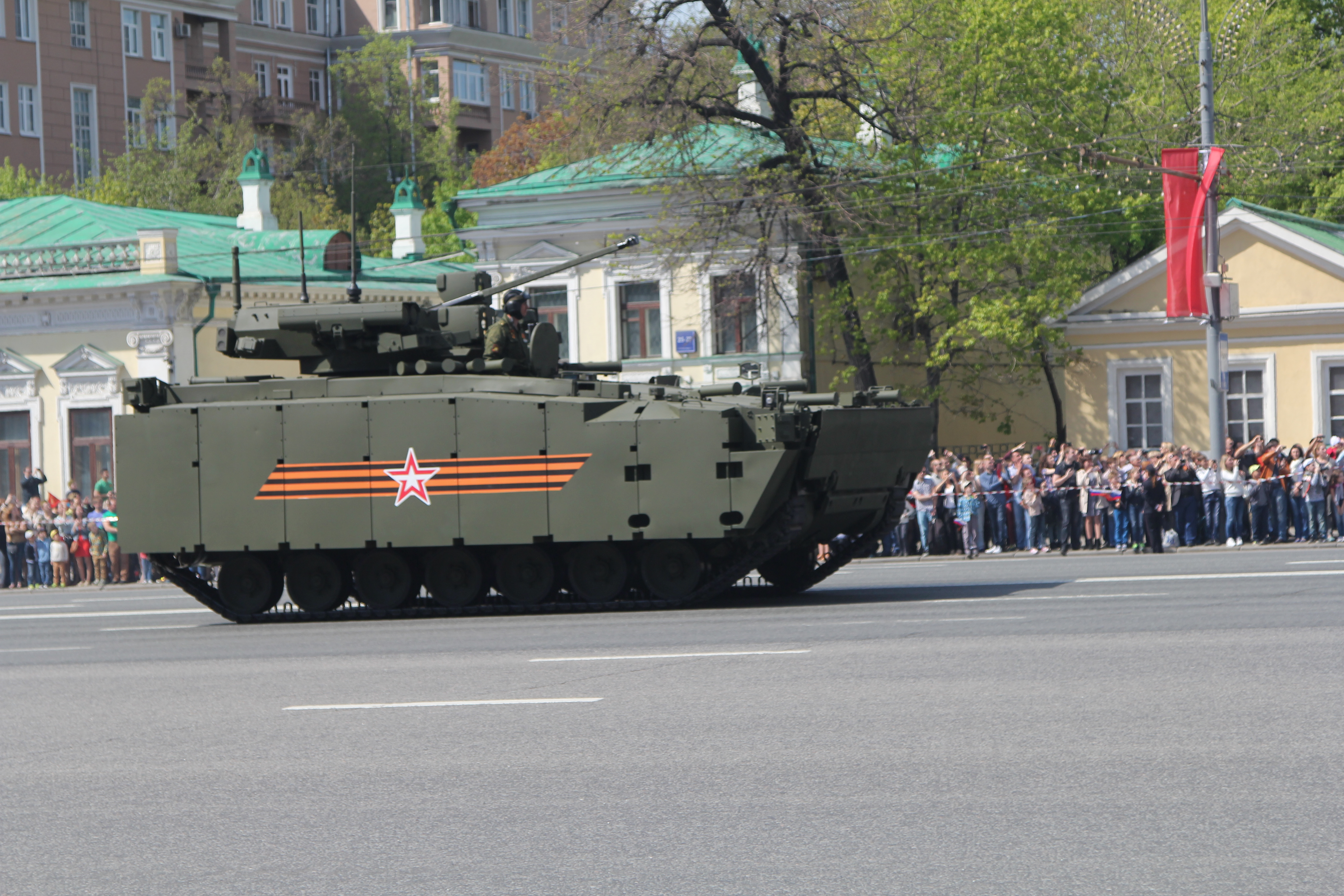
B-11

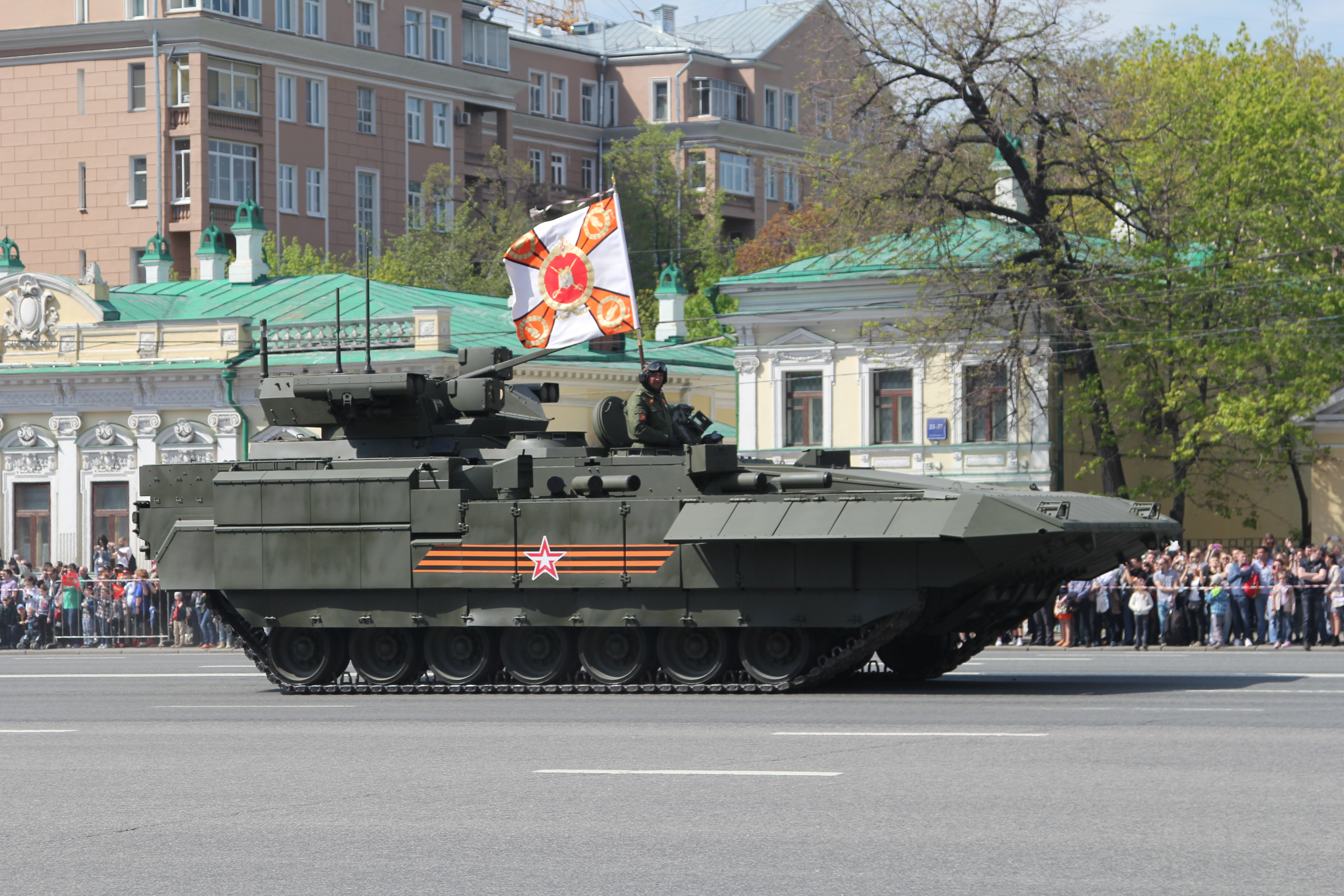
T-15

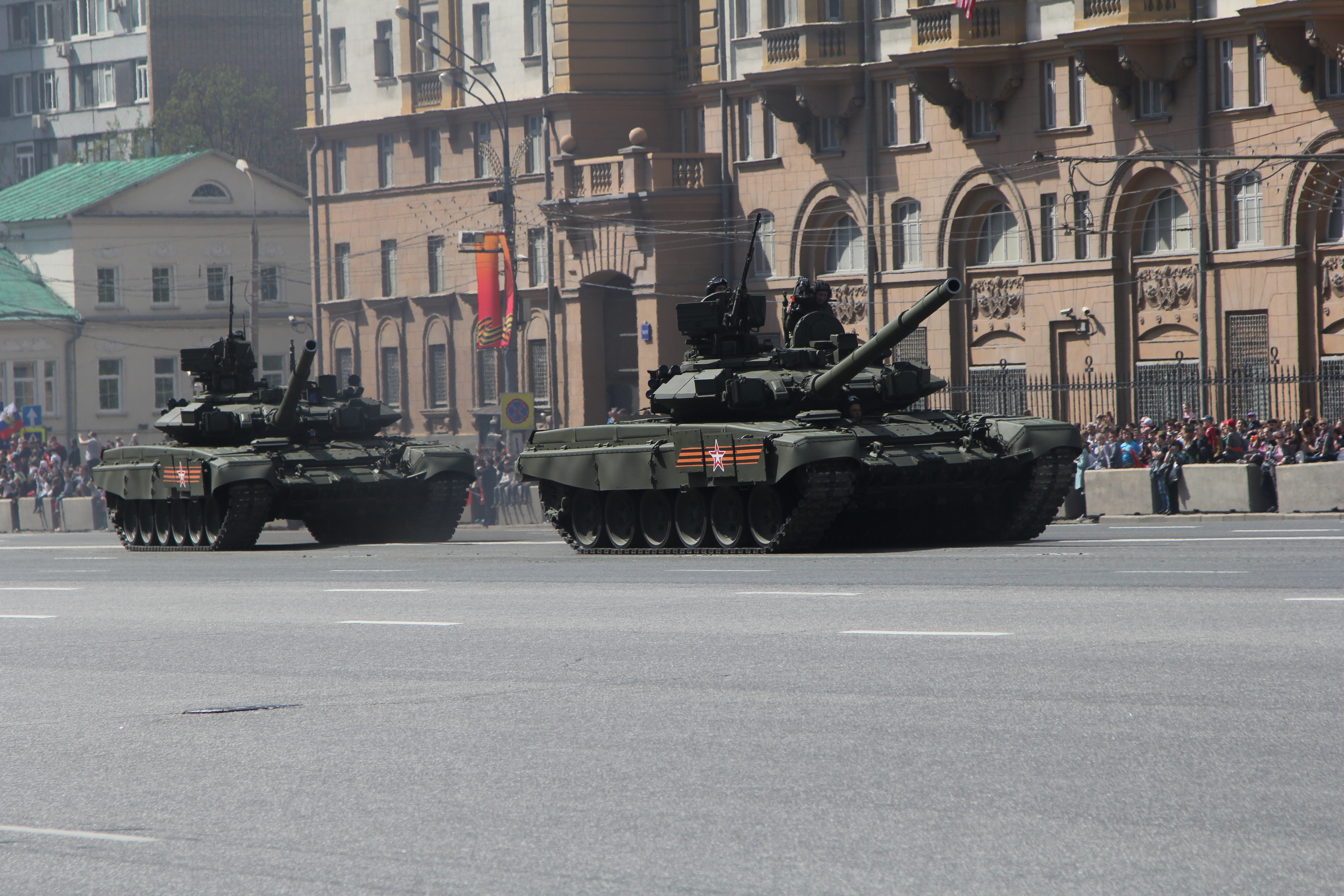
T-90

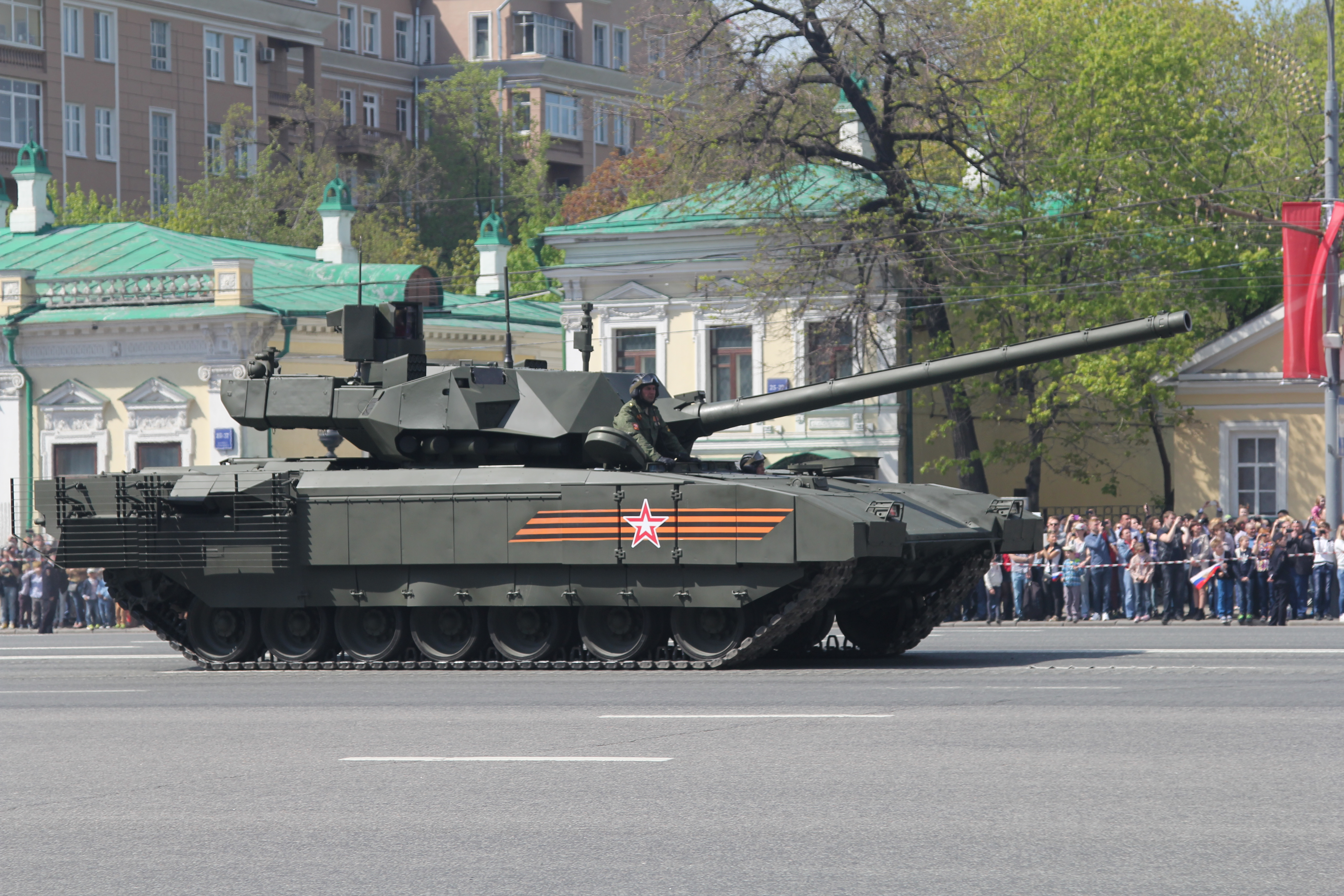
T-14 Armata

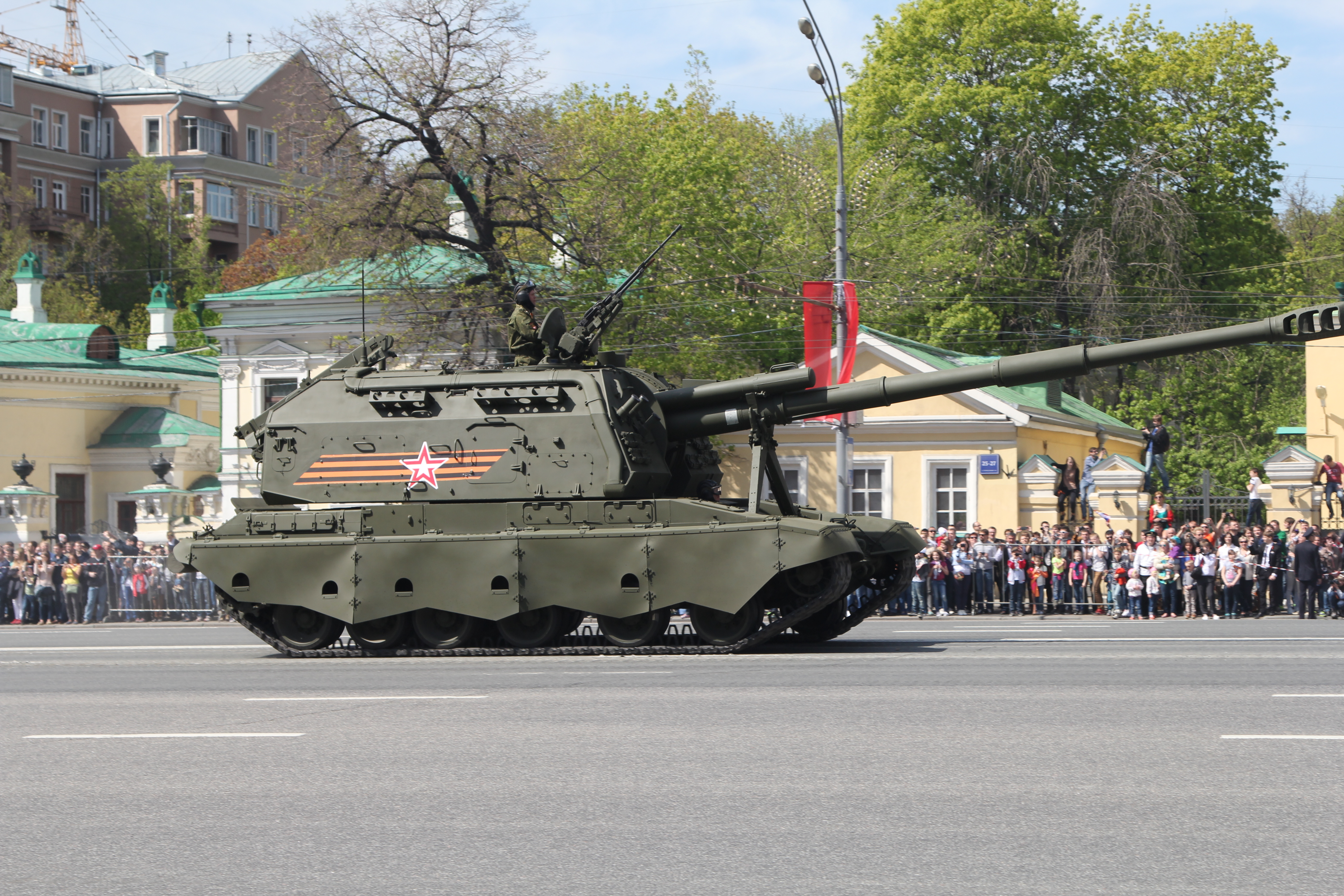
2S19 Msta-S

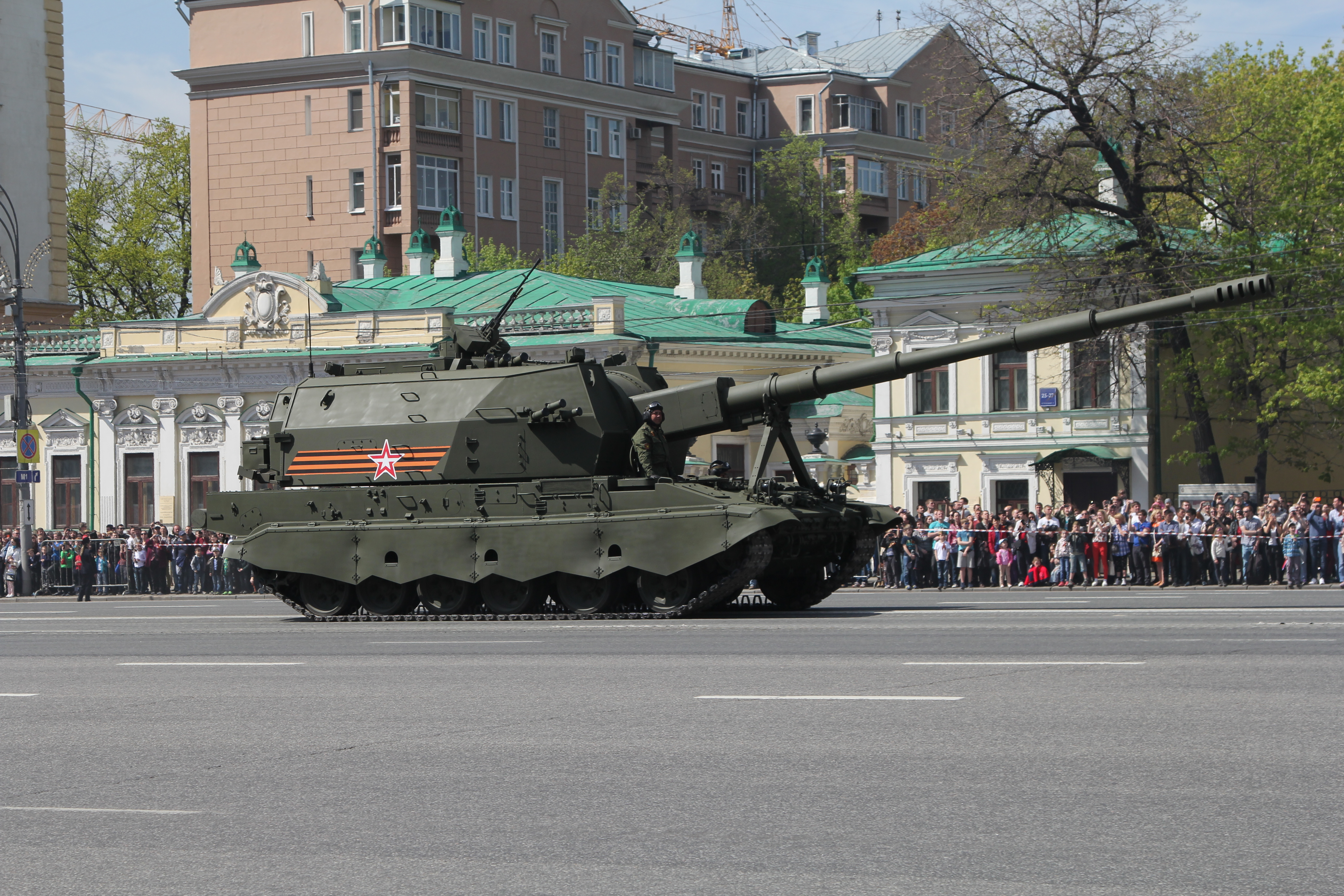
2S35 Koalitsiya-SV

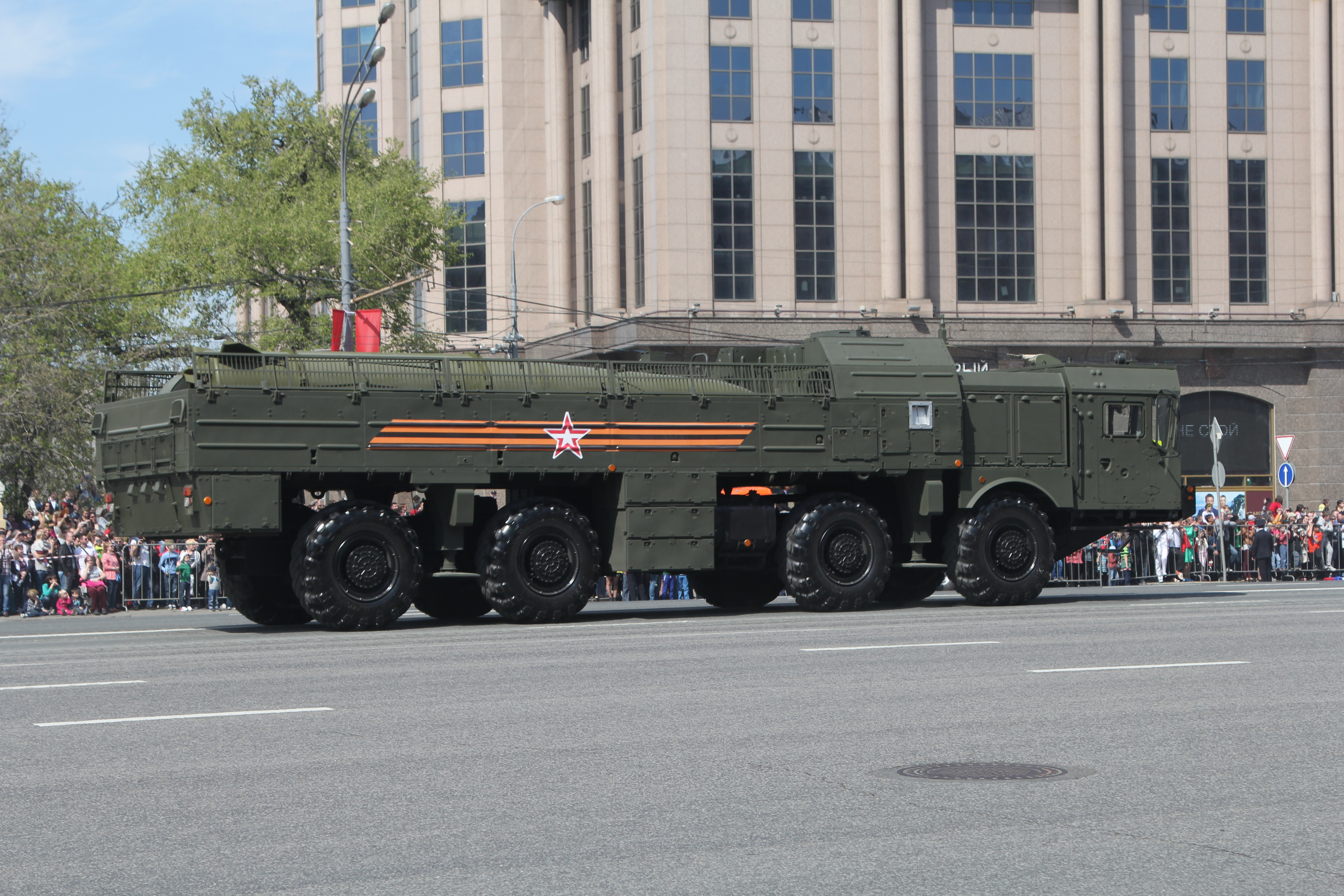
9K720 Iskander-M

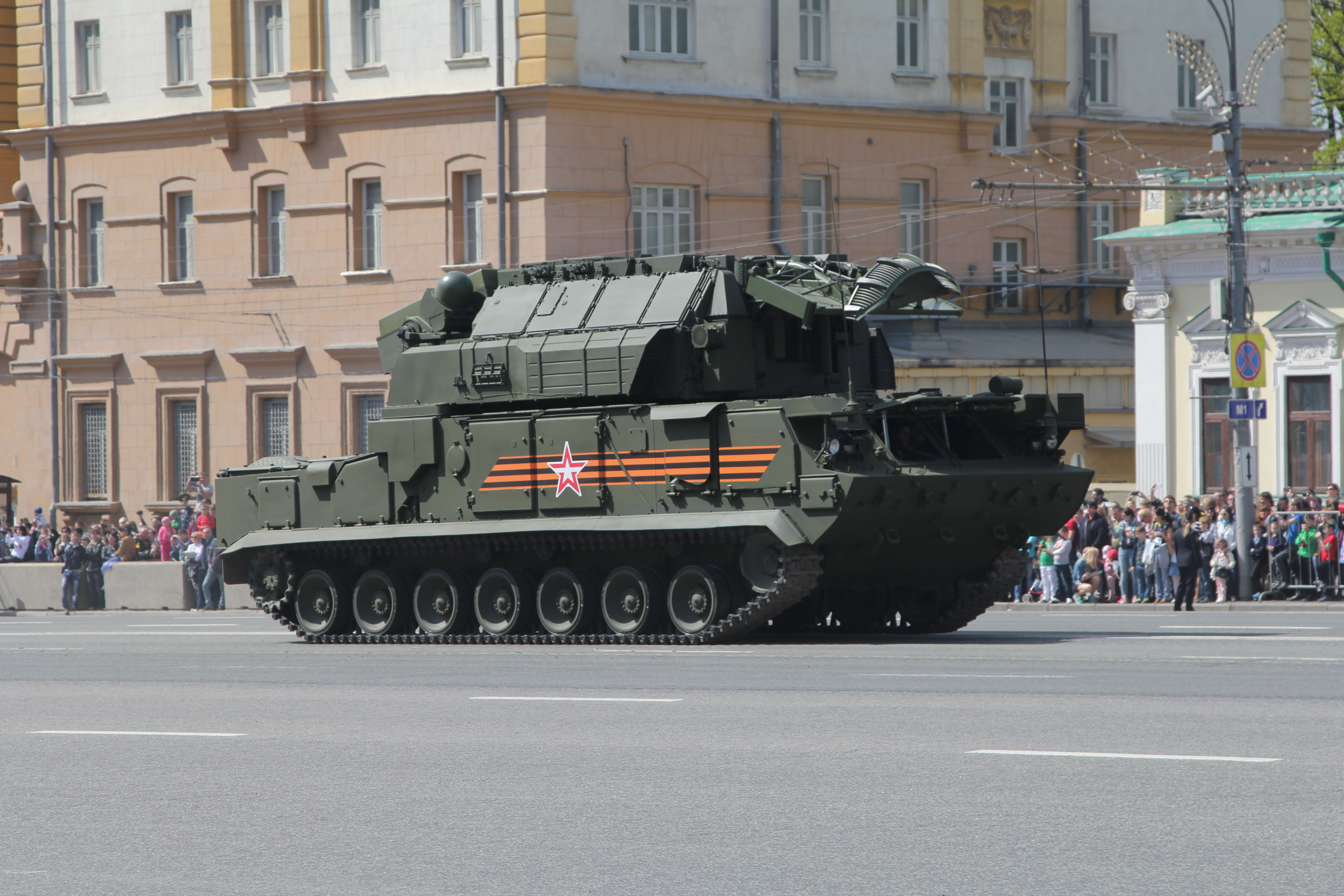
Tor-M2U

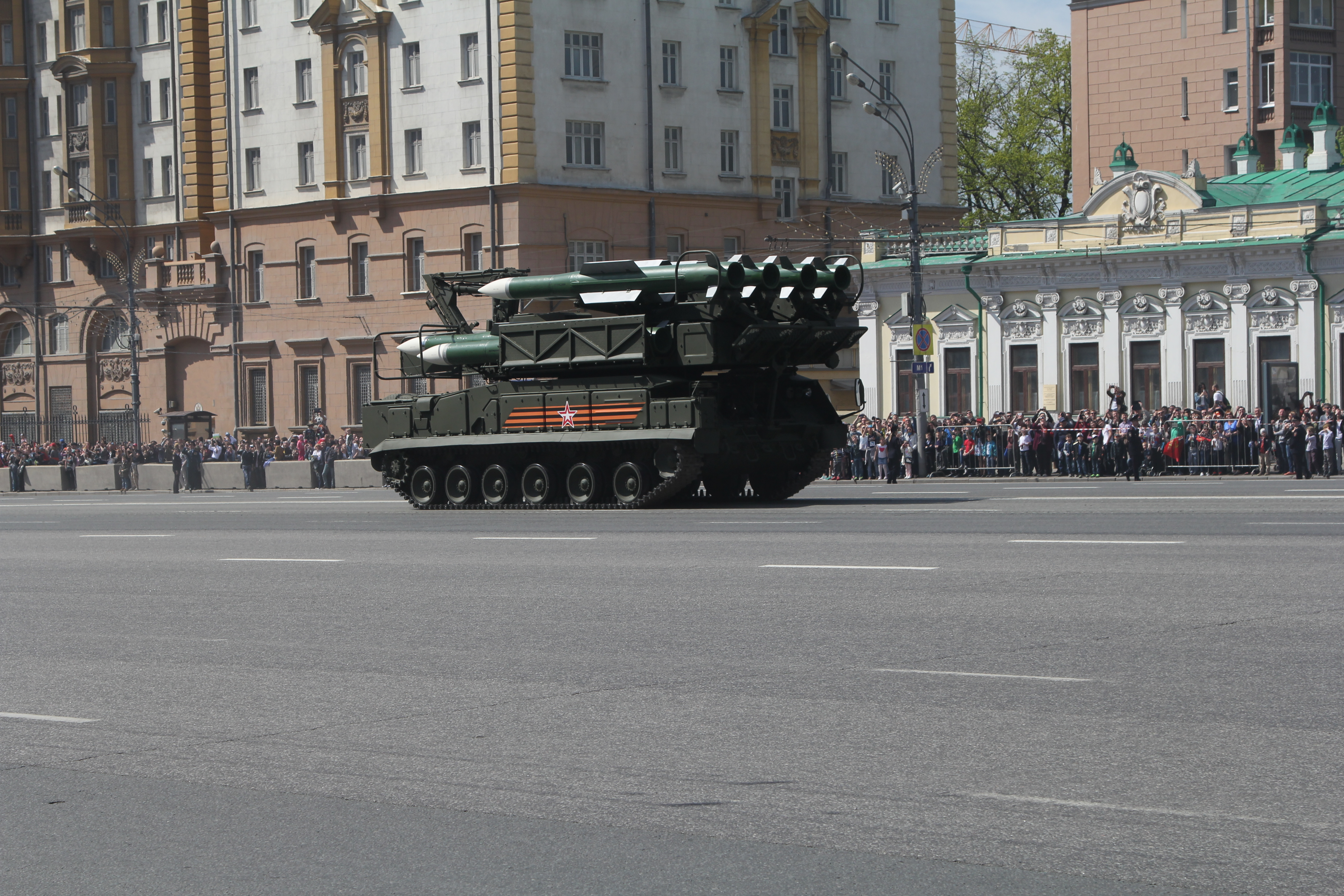
Buk-M2

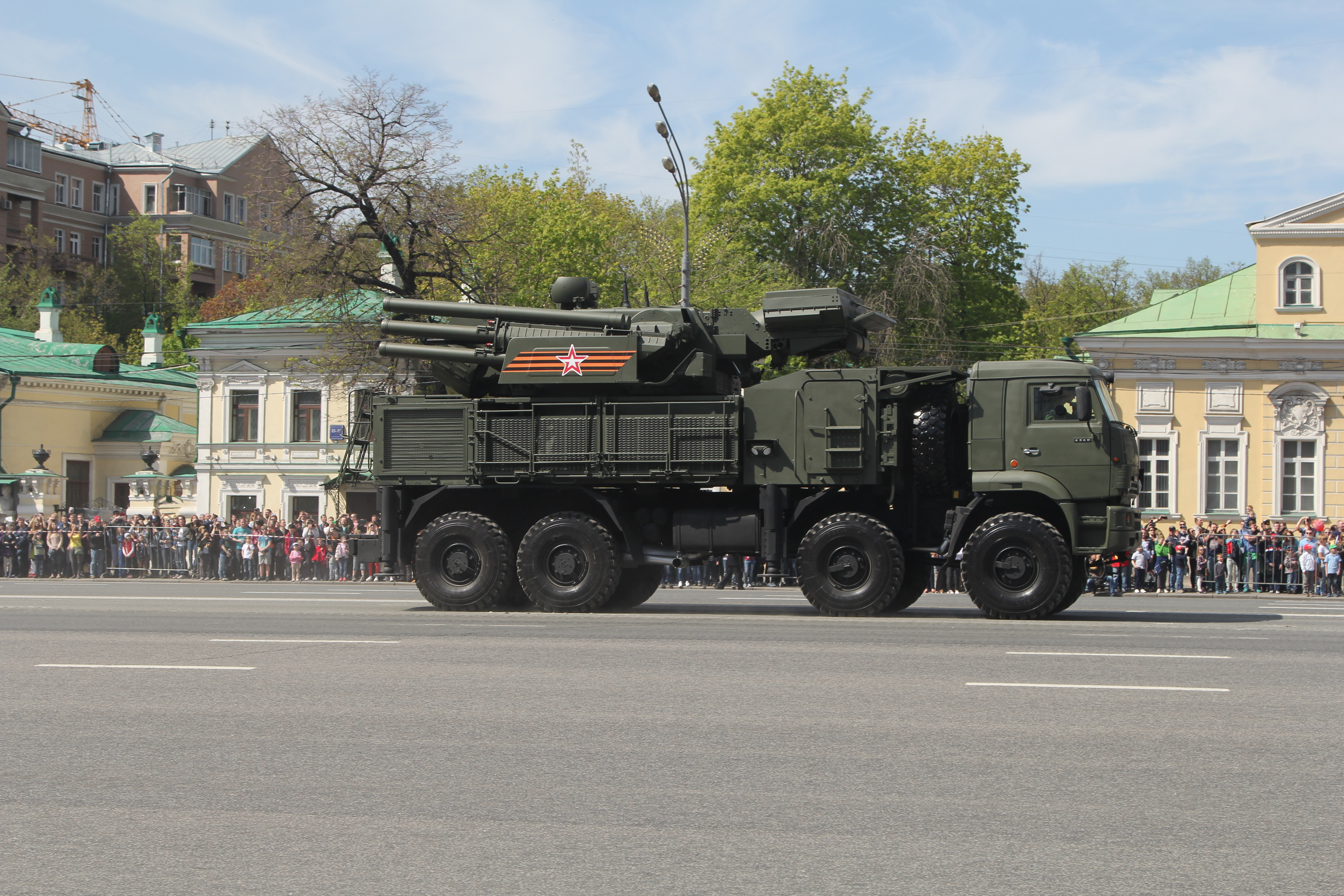
Pantsir-S1

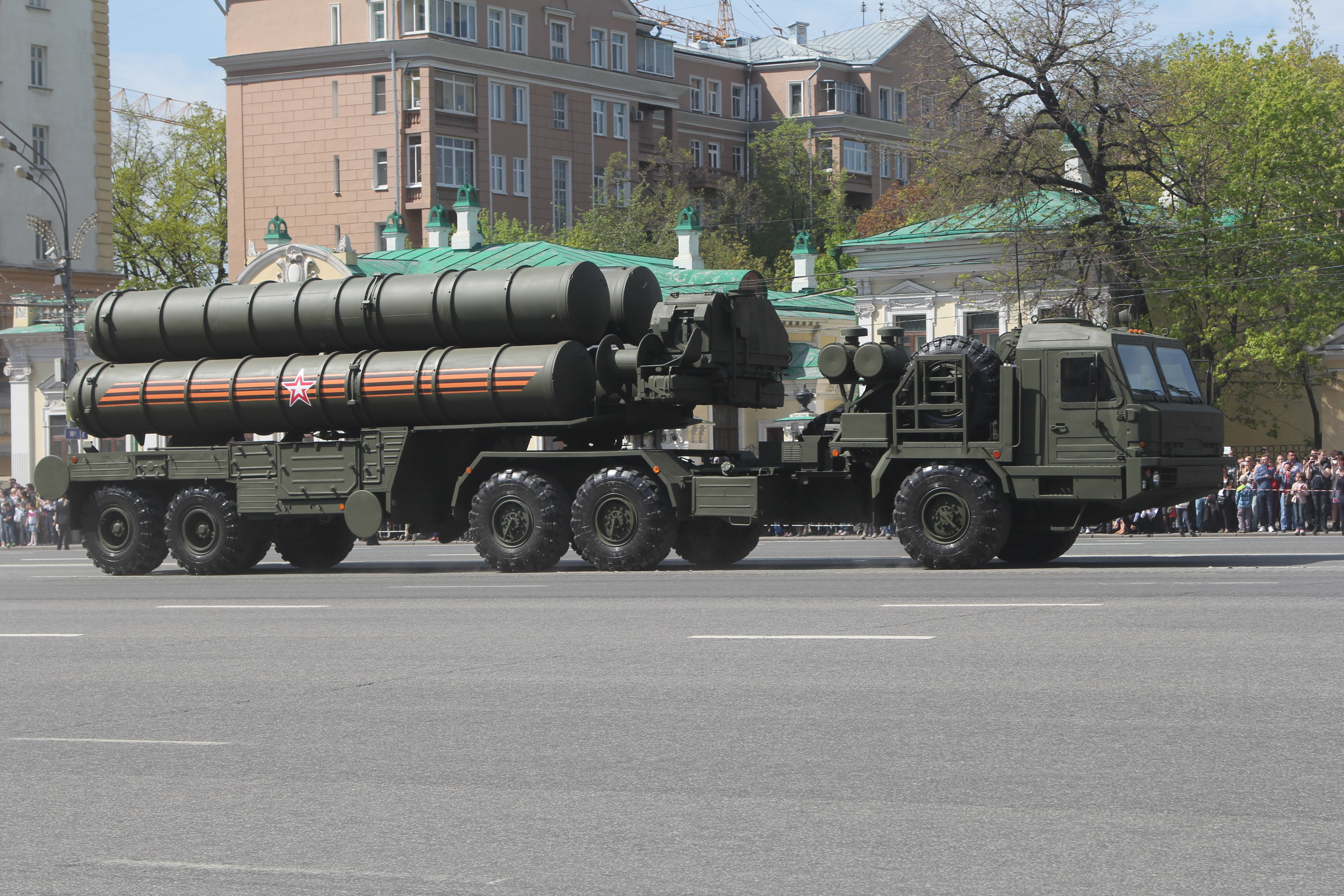
S-400 "Triumpf"

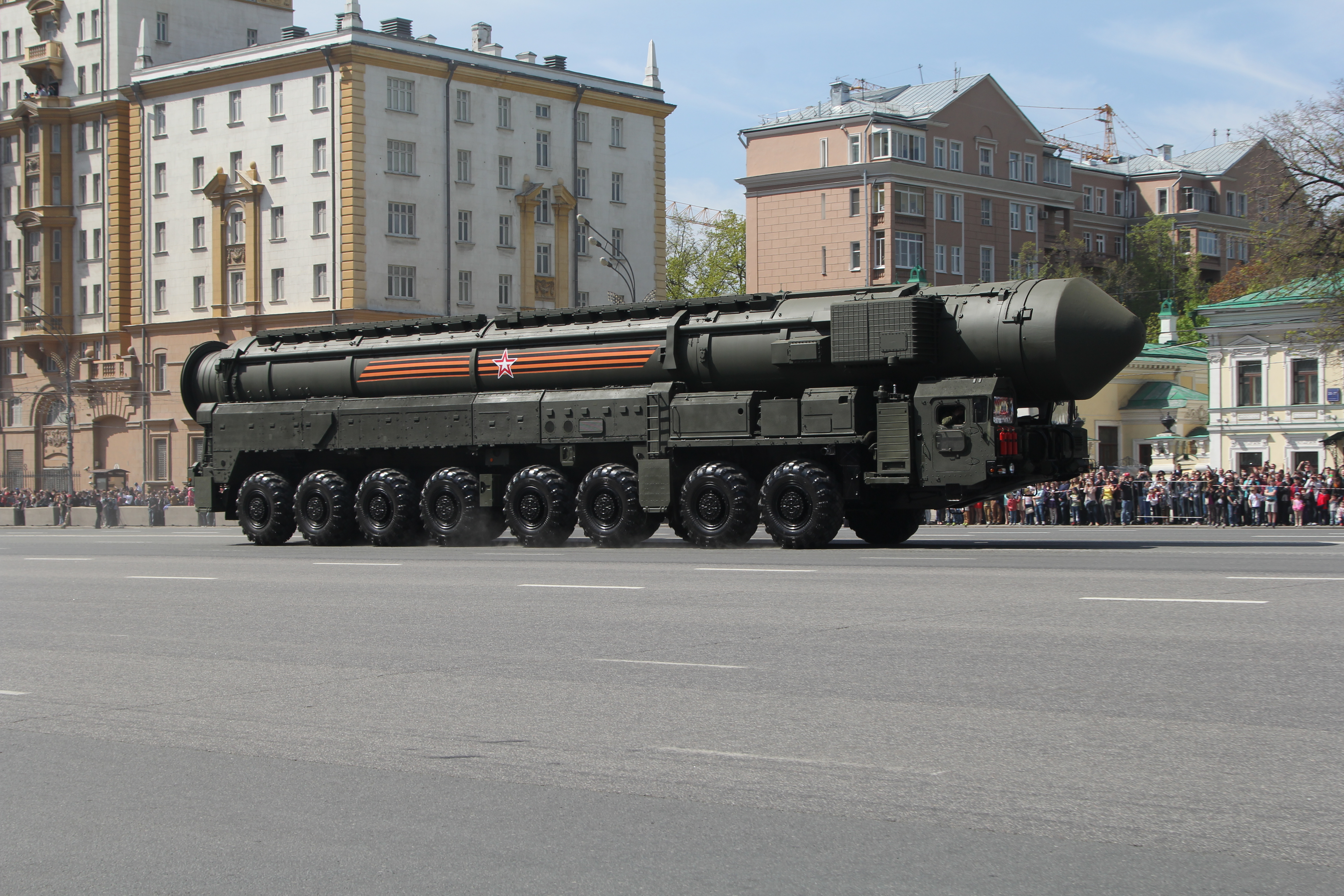
RS-24 "Yars"

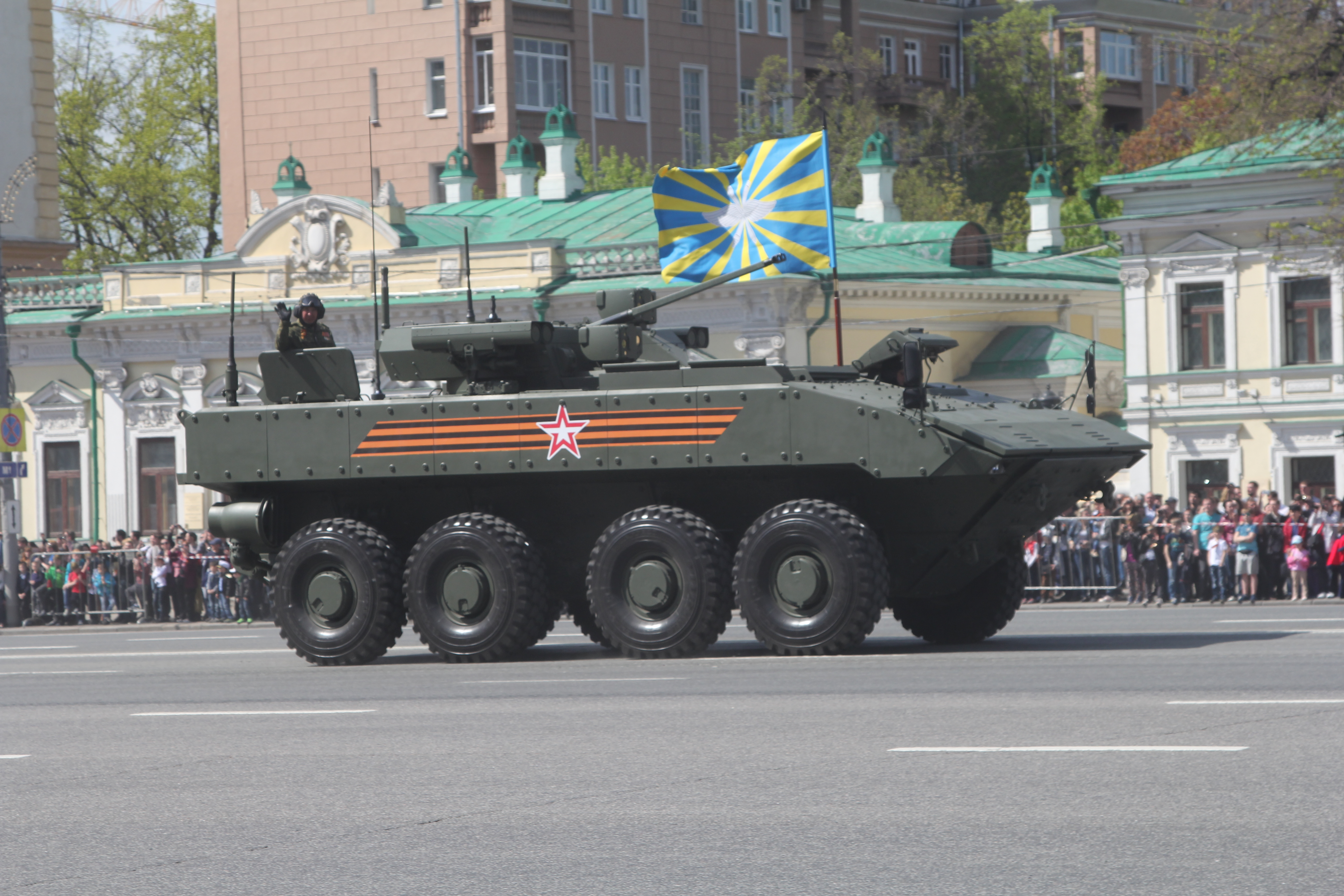
Bumareng
- T-34/85 medium tank
- SU-100 tracked tank destroyer
- GAZ-2975 "Tigr" infantry mobility vehicle
- **Kornet D/EM** mobile ATGM system (First appearance)
- Typhoon-K MRAP
- **Ural Typhoon** MRAP (First appearance)
- BTR-82AM APC
- **BMD-4M** air-droppable IFV (returning)
- **BTR-MDM "Rakushka"** APC (first appearance)
- **BMP Kurganets-25** (first appearance of both IFV and APC versions)
- **T-15** heavy IFV (first appearance)
- T-90A main battle tank
- **T-14** main battle tank (first appearance)
- 2S19 Msta-S tracked self-propelled howitzer
- **2S35 Koalitsiya-SV** tracked self-propelled howitzer (first appearance)
- 9K720 Iskander mobile tactical ballistic missile system
- Tor-M2U mobile SAM system on tracked chassis
- Buk-M2 mobile tracked SAM system
- Pantsir-S1 mobile SAM system on wheeled chassis
- S-400 Triumf mobile launch unit on 5P85TE2 trailer
- **RS-24 Yars** road-mobile ICBM system (first appearance)
- **BTR Bumerang APC** (first appearance)

=== Air Fly Past Column ===
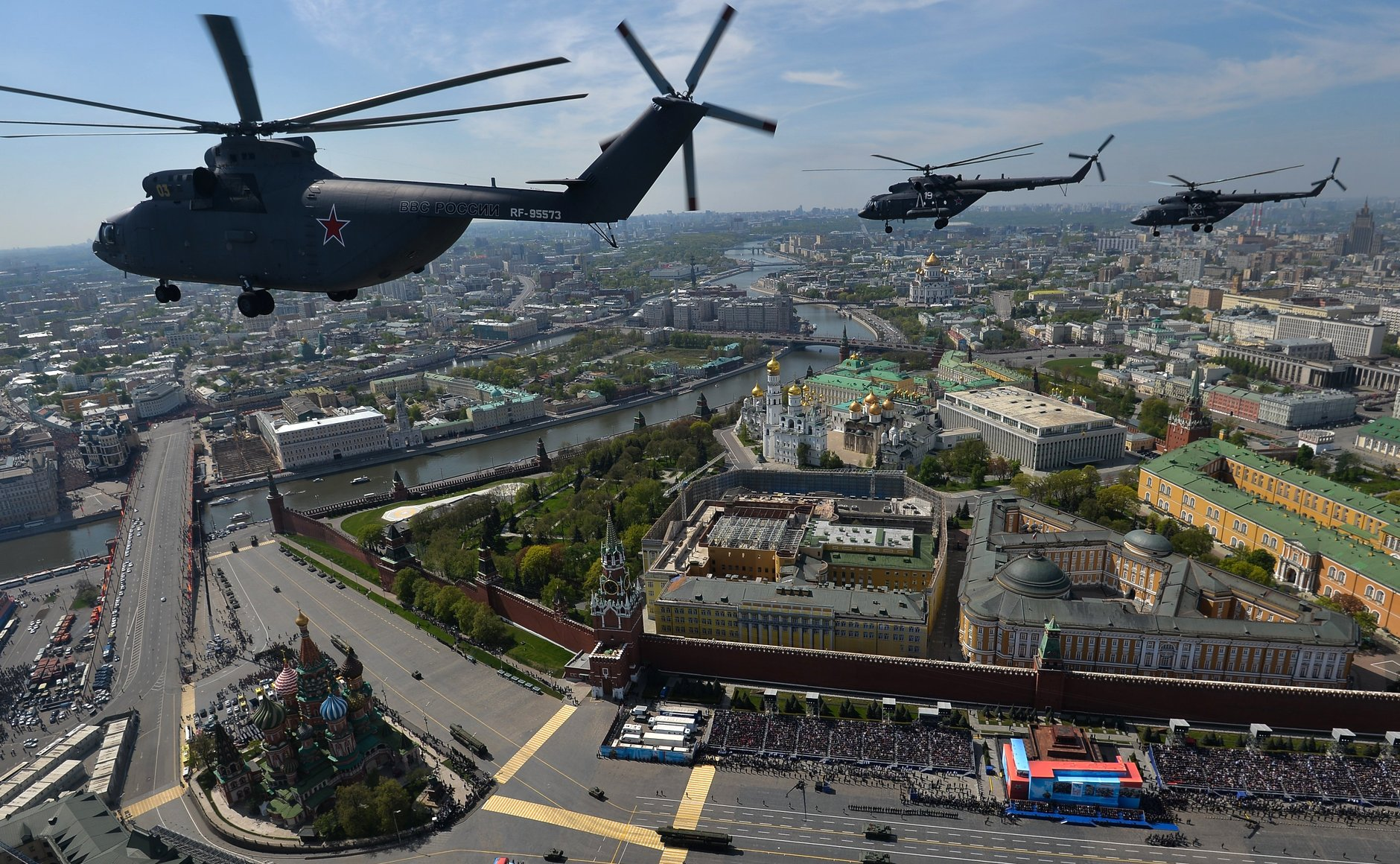
Mi-26 and two Mi-17s fly over the Red Square

- Mil Mi-26
- Mil Mi-17 Colors Party
- Mil Mi-24
- Mil Mi-28
- Mil Mi-35
- Kamov Ka-52
- **Kazan Ansat** (first appearance)
- Mikoyan MiG-29
- Sukhoi Su-24
- Sukhoi Su-34
- Sukhoi Su-27
- **Sukhoi Su-30** (first appearance)
- **Sukhoi Su-35** (first appearance)
- Mikoyan MiG-31
- Ilyushin Il-76
- Ilyushin Il-78
- Tupolev Tu-22M3
- Tupolev Tu-95
- Tupolev Tu-160
- Sukhoi Su-25
- Antonov An-124
- Antonov An-22
- Yakovlev Yak-130 from the new aerobatic group **Crimean Wings** (first appearance)
- **Sukhoi Su-27 and Mikoyan MiG-29 of the Russian Knights and Strizhi** (returning)

== Music ==
Flag procession, Review, and Address

- Sacred War (Священная Война) by Alexander Alexanderov
- Solemn Triumphal March (Торжественно-Триумфальный Марш) by Valery Khalilov
- March of the Preobrazhensky Regiment (Марш Преображенского Полка) by Unknown
- Slow March of the Officers Schools (Встречный Марш офицерских училищ) by Semyon Tchernetsky
- Slow March to Carry the War Flag (Встречный Марш для выноса Боевого Знамени) by Dmitriy Valentinovich Kadeyev
- Slow March of the Guards of the Navy (Гвардейский Встречный Марш Военно-Морского Флота) by Nikolai Pavlocich Ivanov-Radkevich
- Slow March (Встречный Марш) by Evgeny Aksyonov
- Glory (Славься) by Mikhail Glinka
- Parade Fanfare All Listen! (Парадная Фанфара “Слушайте все!”) by Andrei Golovin
- State Anthem of the Russian Federation (Государственный Гимн Российской Федерации) by Alexander Alexandrov
- Signal Retreat (Сигнал “Отбой”)

Infantry Column

- March General Miloradovich (Марш “Генерал Милорадович”) by Valery Khalilov
- Triumph of the Winners (Триумф Победителей)
- Farewell of Slavianka (Прощание Славянки) by Vasiliy Agapkin
- At an Unknamed Height (На безымянной высоте) by Veniamin Bacner
- Cossacks in Berlin (Казаки в Берлине) by Pokrass Brothers
- Moscow Nights (Подмосковные вечера) by Vasily Solovyov-Sedym
- Blue Scarf (Синий платочек) by Jerzy Petersbursky
- Katyusha (Катюша) by Matvey Blanter
- Moscow May (Москва майская) by Pokrass Brothers
- March Parade Ground (Марш “Плац”) by Valery Khalilov
- On Guard for the Peace (На страже Мира) by Boris Alexanderovich Diev
- Air March (Авиамарш) by Yuliy Abramovich Khait
- March Airplanes – First of all (Марш “Первым делом самолёты”) by Vasili-Solovyov-Sedoi
- Legendary Sevastopol (Легендарный Севастополь) by Bano Muradeli
- The Crew is One Family (Экипаж - одна семья) by Viktor Vasilyevich Pleshak
- Artillery March (Марш Артиллеристов) by Tikhon Khrennikov
- March of the Cosmonauts/Friends, I believe (Марш Космонавтов /Я верю, друзья) by Oskar Borisovich Feltsman
- We Need One Victory (Нам Нужна Одна Победа) by Bulat Shalvovich Okudzhava
- The Last Battle (Последний бой) by Mikhail Nozhkin
- To Serve Russia (Служить России) by Eduard Cemyonovich Khanok
- Sound about the Alarming Youth (Песня о тревожной молодости) by Alexandera Pakhmutova
- Eternal Flame (Вечный огонь) by Rafail Khoak
- Ballad of a Soldier (Баллада о Солдате) by Vasily Pavlovich Solovyov-Sedoy
- On the Road (В Путь) by Vasily Pavlovich Solovyov-Sedoy

Mobile Column

- March General Miloradovich (Марш “Генерал Милорадович”) by Valery Khalilov
- March Three Tankmen (Марш “Три Танкиста”) by Pokrass Brothers
- Katyusha (Катюша) by Matvey Blanter
- Legendary Sevastopol (Легендарный Севастополь) by Bano Muradeli
- Invincible and Legendary (Несокрушимая и легендарная) by Alexander Alexandrov
- March of the Soviet Tankists (Марш сове́тских танки́стов) by Pokrass Brothers
- March Hero (Марш “Герой”) by Unknown
- March Victory (Марш “Победа”) by Albert Mikhailovich Arutyunov
- Artillery March (Марш Артиллеристов) by Tikhon Khrennikov
- Long Live our State (Да здравствует наша держава) by Boris Alexandrov

Air Column

- Air March (Авиамарш) by Yuliy Abramovich Khait
- March Airplanes – First of all (Марш “Первым делом самолёты”) by Vasili-Solovyov-Sedoi
- Air March (Авиамарш) by Yuliy Abramovich Khait
- March Airplanes – First of all (Марш “Первым делом самолёты”) by Vasili-Solovyov-Sedoi
- Air March (Авиамарш) by Yuliy Abramovich Khait

Conclusion

- We are the Army of the People (Мы Армия Народа) by Georgy Viktorovich Mavsesya
- Victory Day (День Победы) by David Fyodorovich Tukhmanov

== Gallery ==
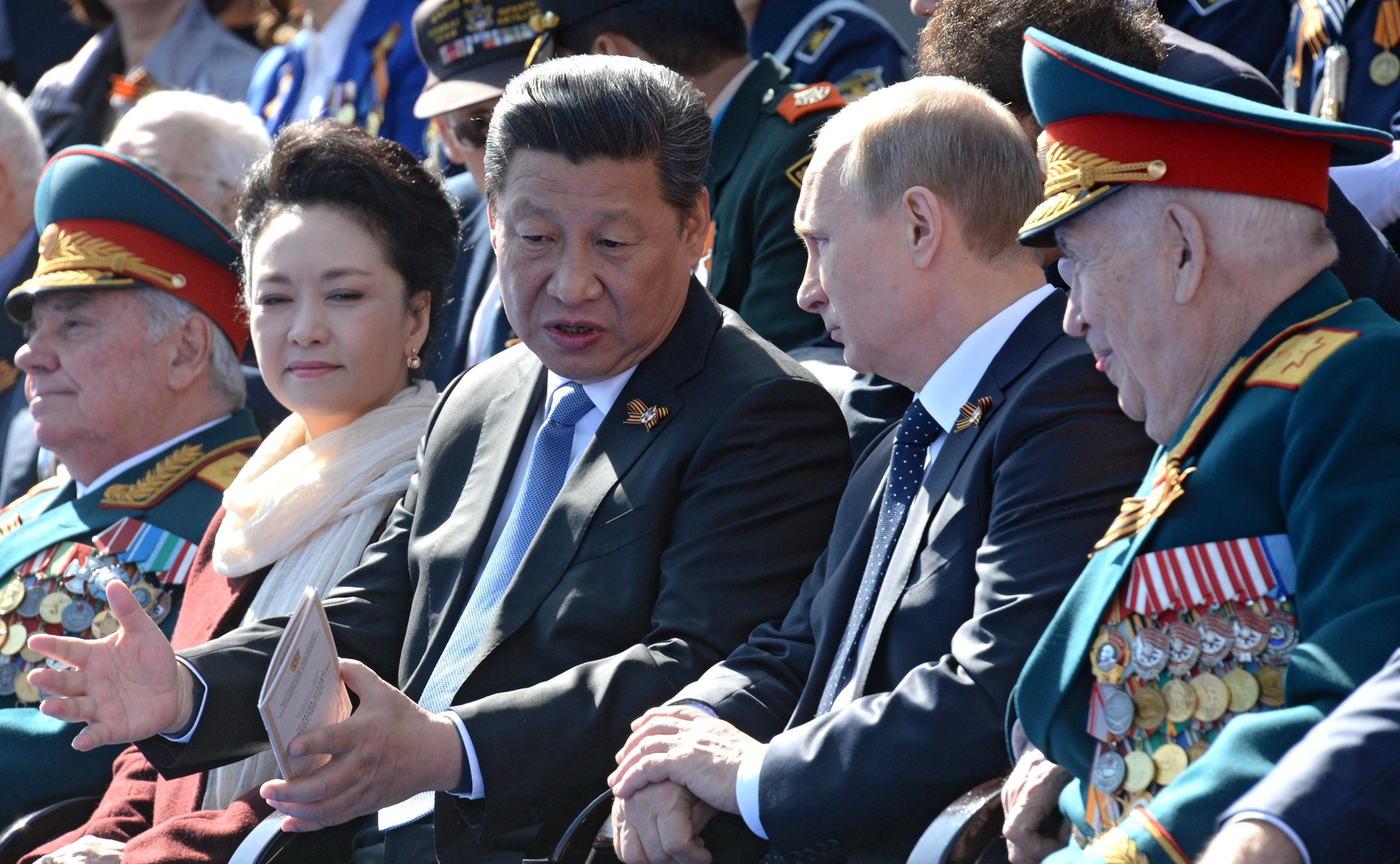
Chinese leader Xi Jinping and his wife with Russian President Vladimir Putin

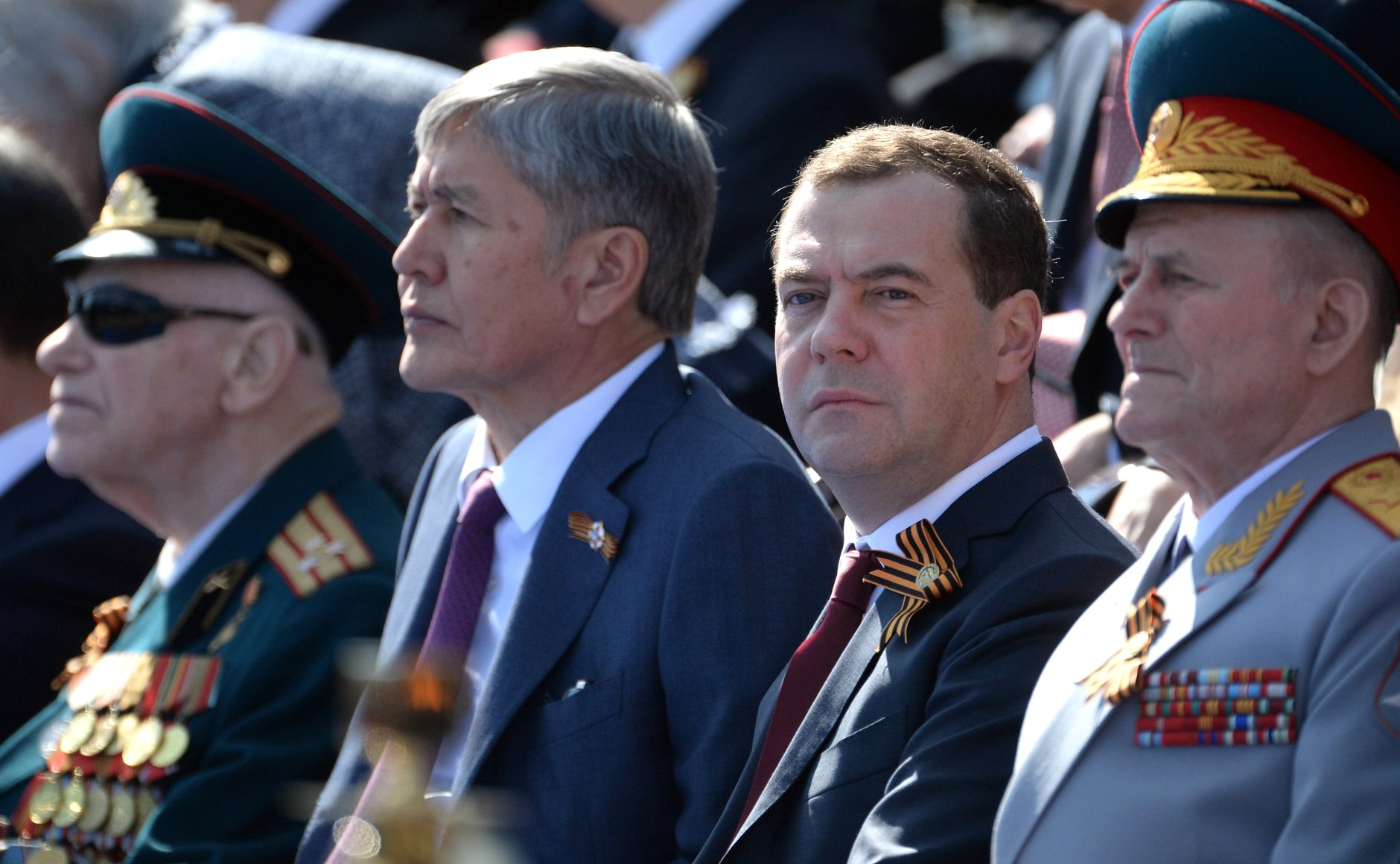
Kyrgyz President Almazbek Atambayev with Russian Prime Minister Dmitry Medvedev

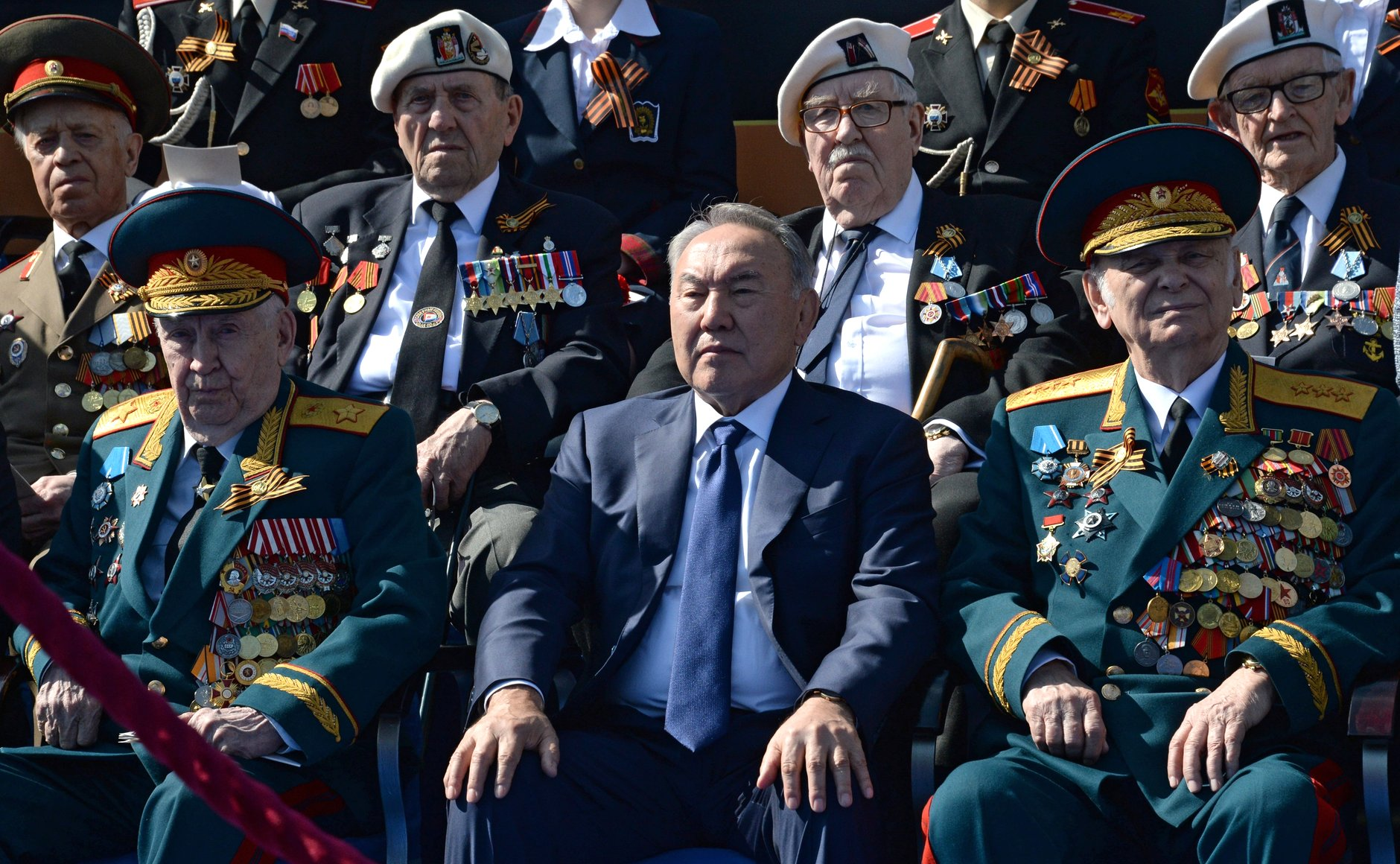
Kazakh President Nursultan Nazarbayev with veterans during the parade

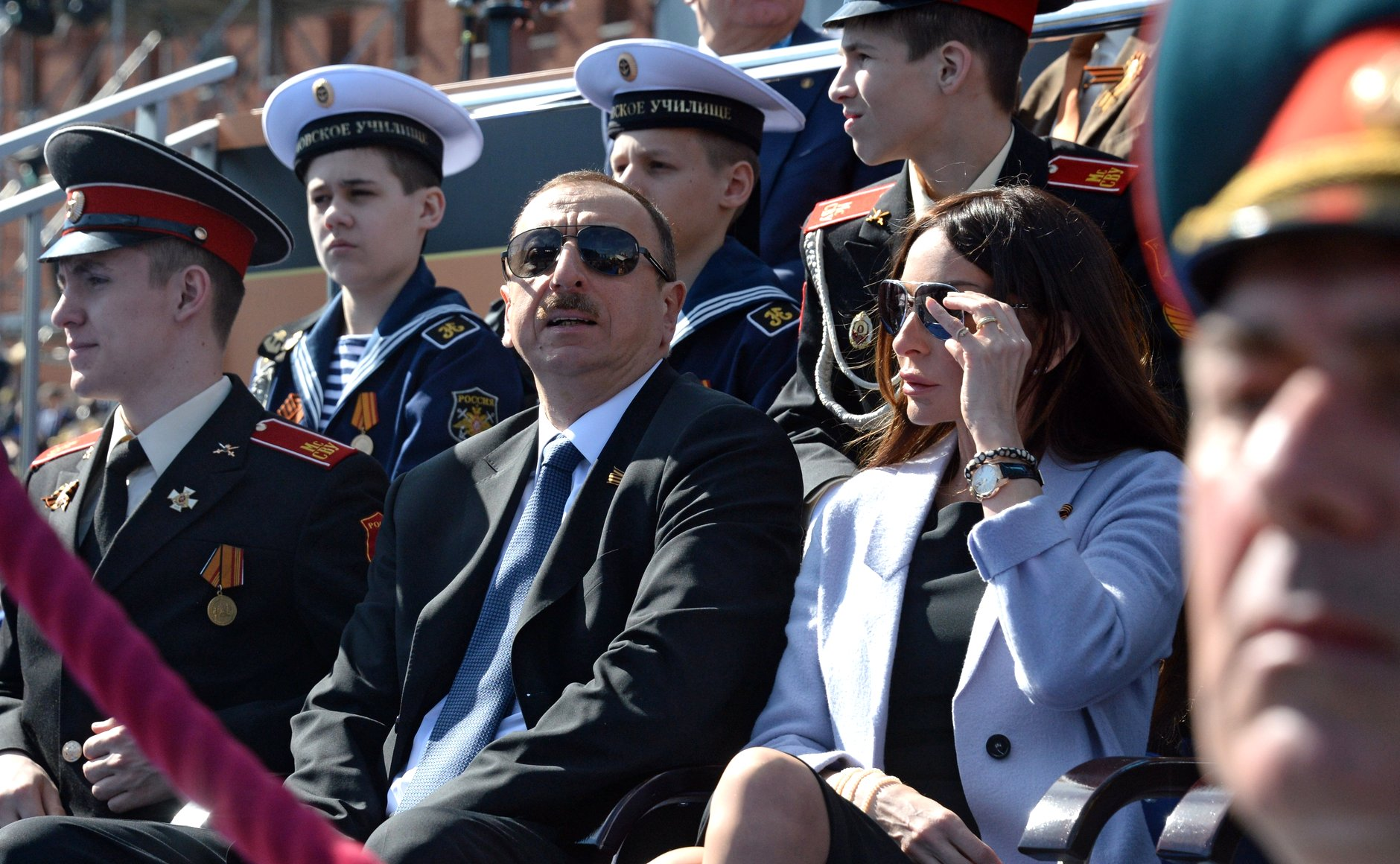
Azerbaijani President Ilham Aliyev with his wife

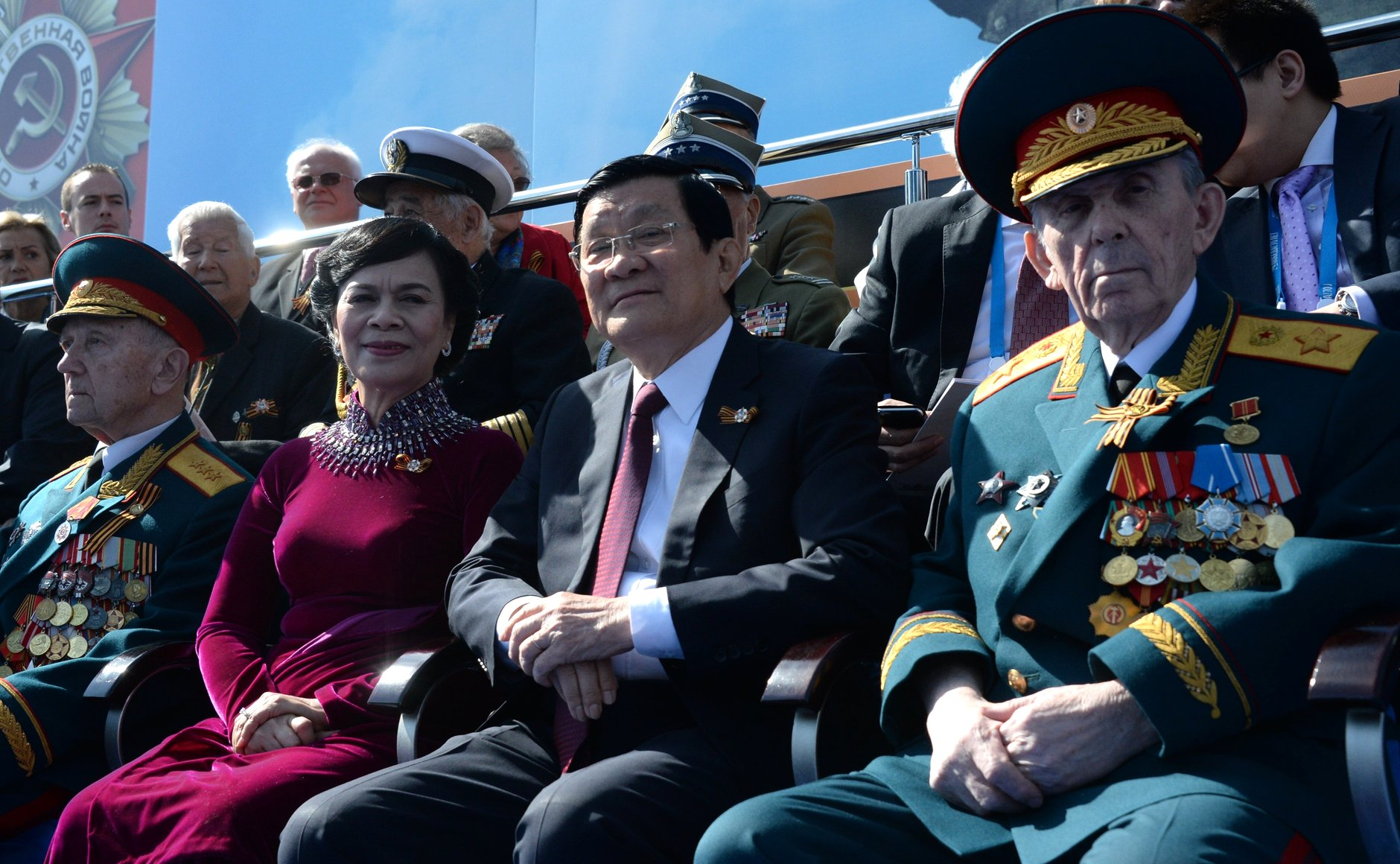
Vietnamese President Trương Tấn Sang with his wife

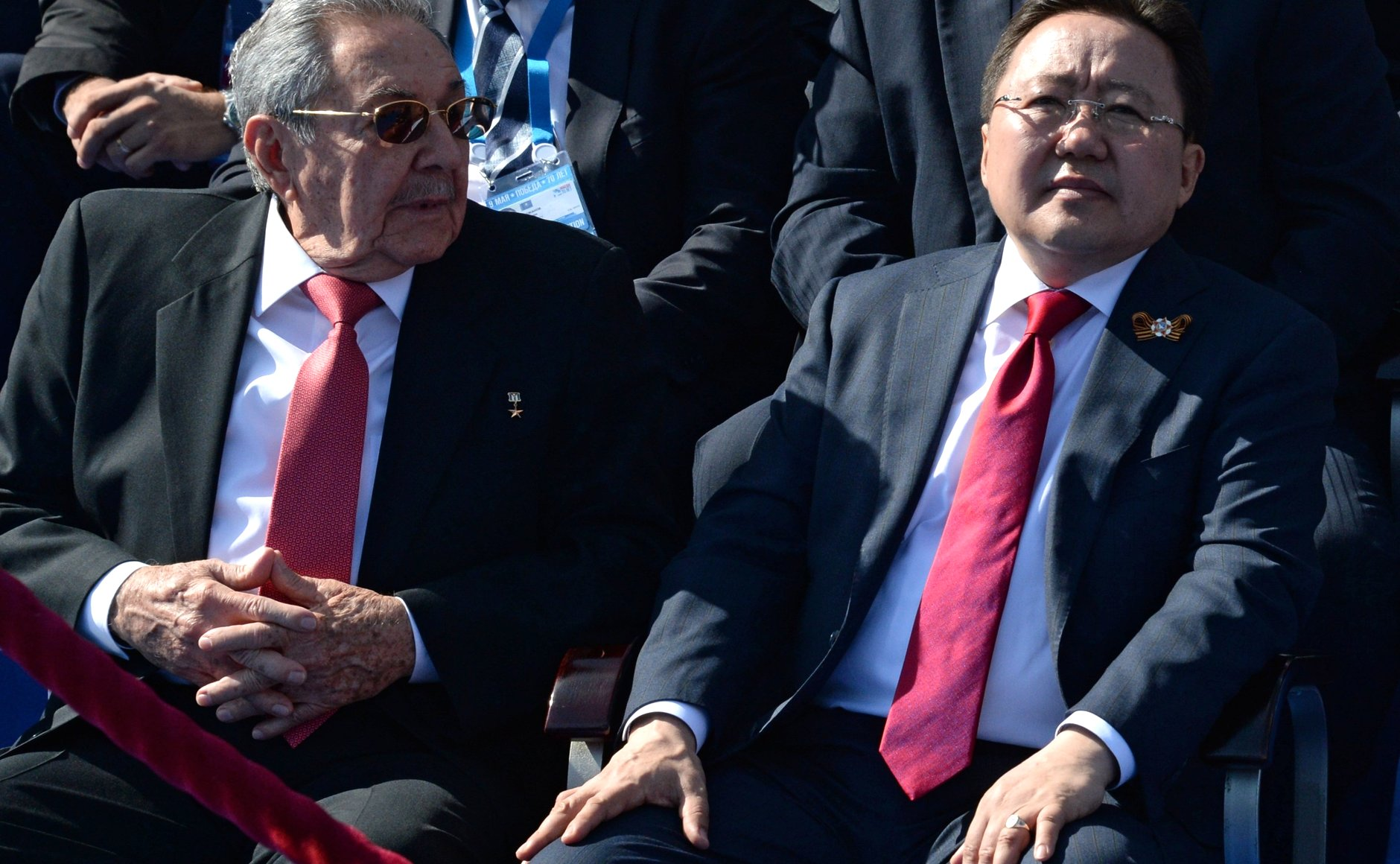
Cuban leader Raúl Castro with Mongolian President Tsakhiagiin Elbegdorj

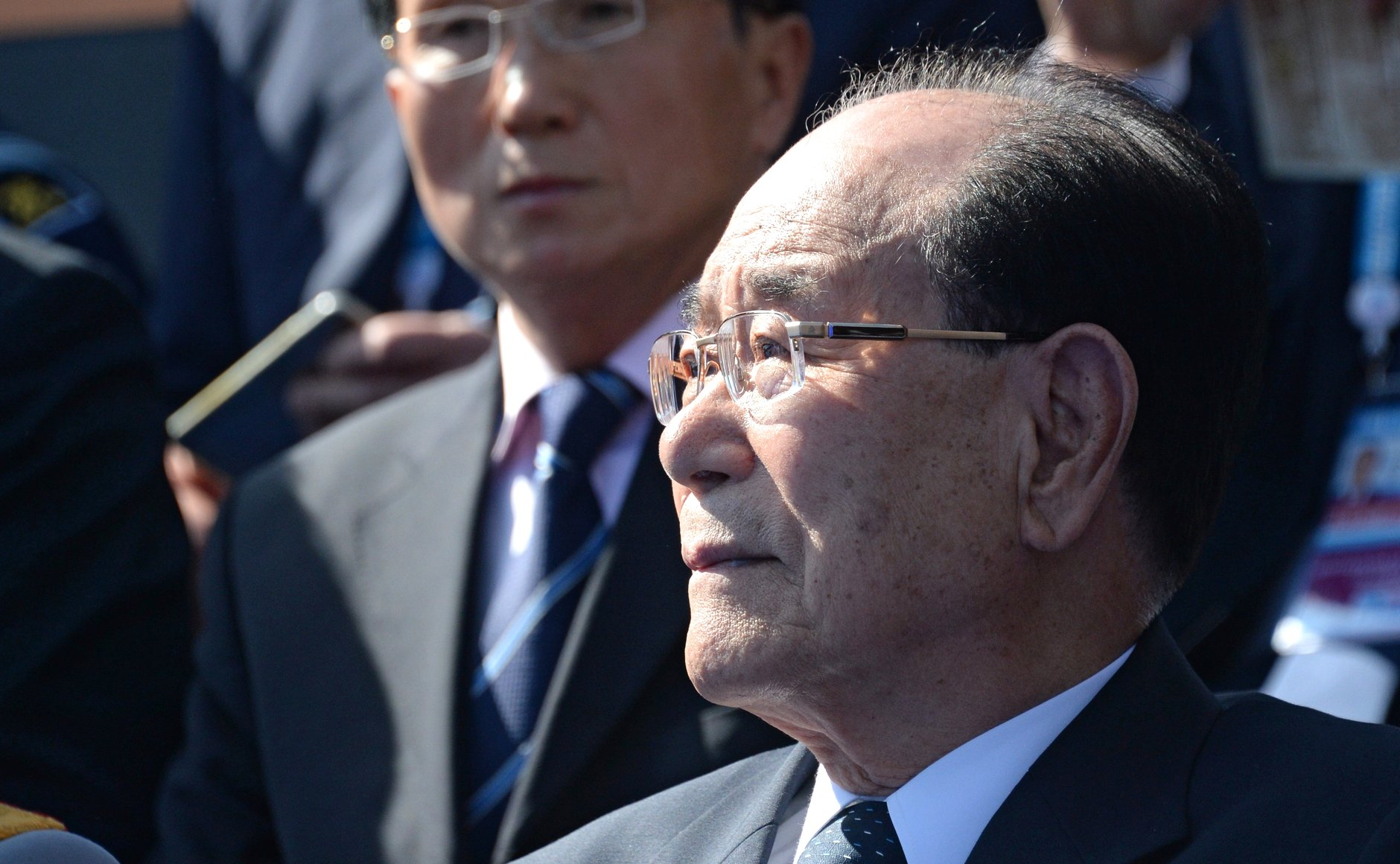
North Korean Chairman of the Supreme People's Assembly Kim Yong-nam during the parade

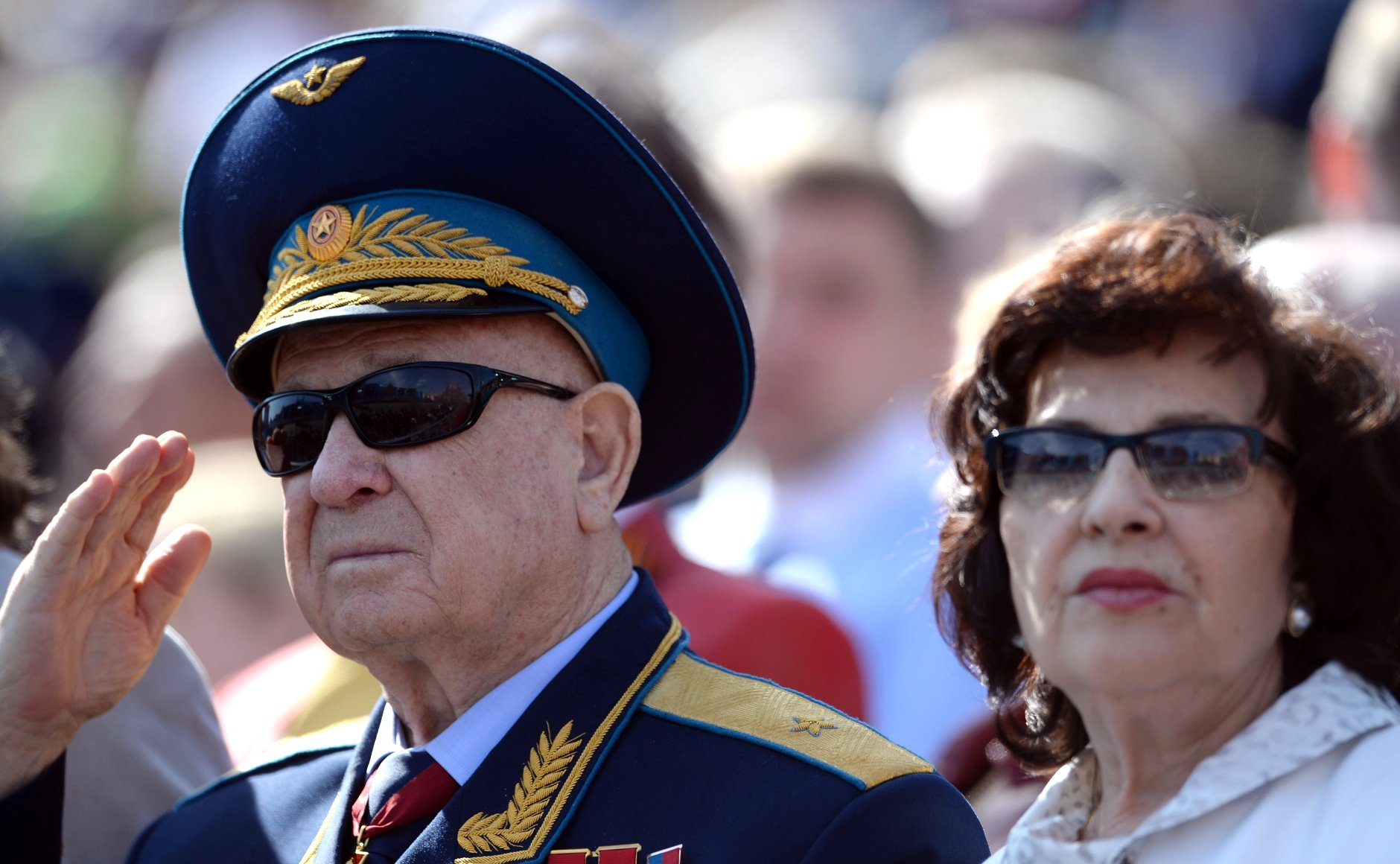
Former Soviet cosmonaut and first space walker Alexei Leonov with his wife during the parade

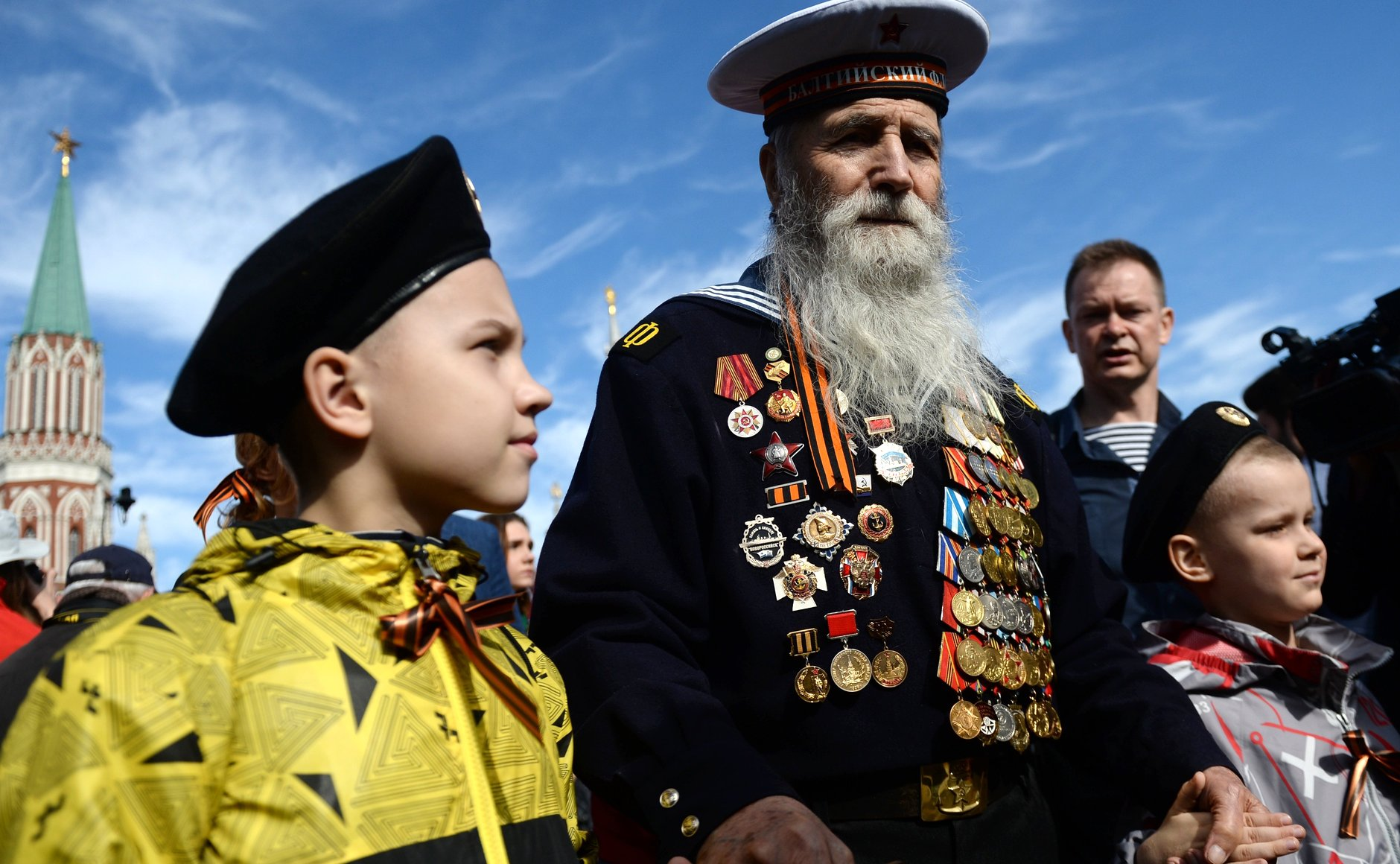
Georgy Shirokov, 91-year-old Russian veteran of World War II and former sailor of the Baltic Fleet walks with his great grandchildren

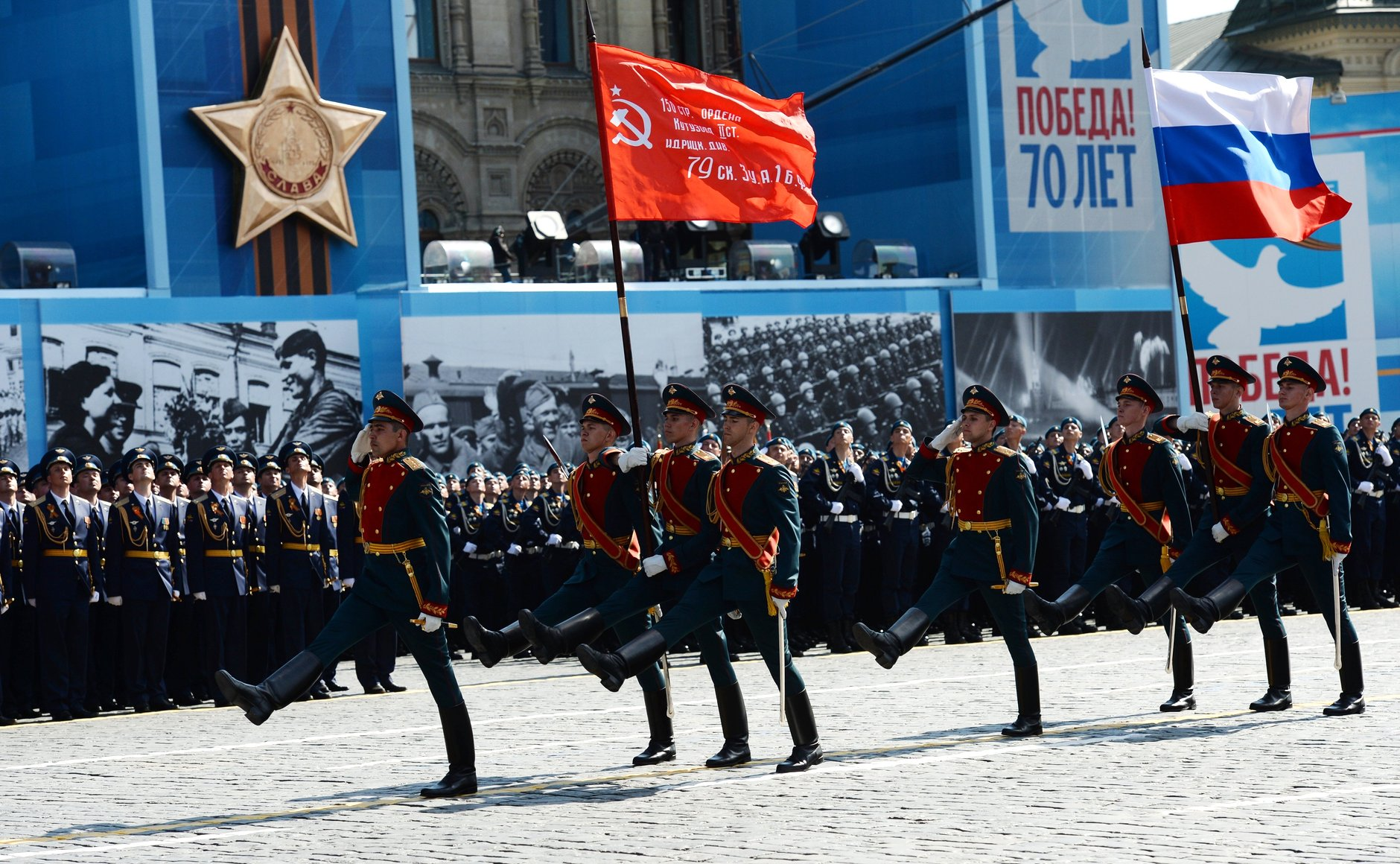
Honour guard marching with the Victory Banner and the Russian flag

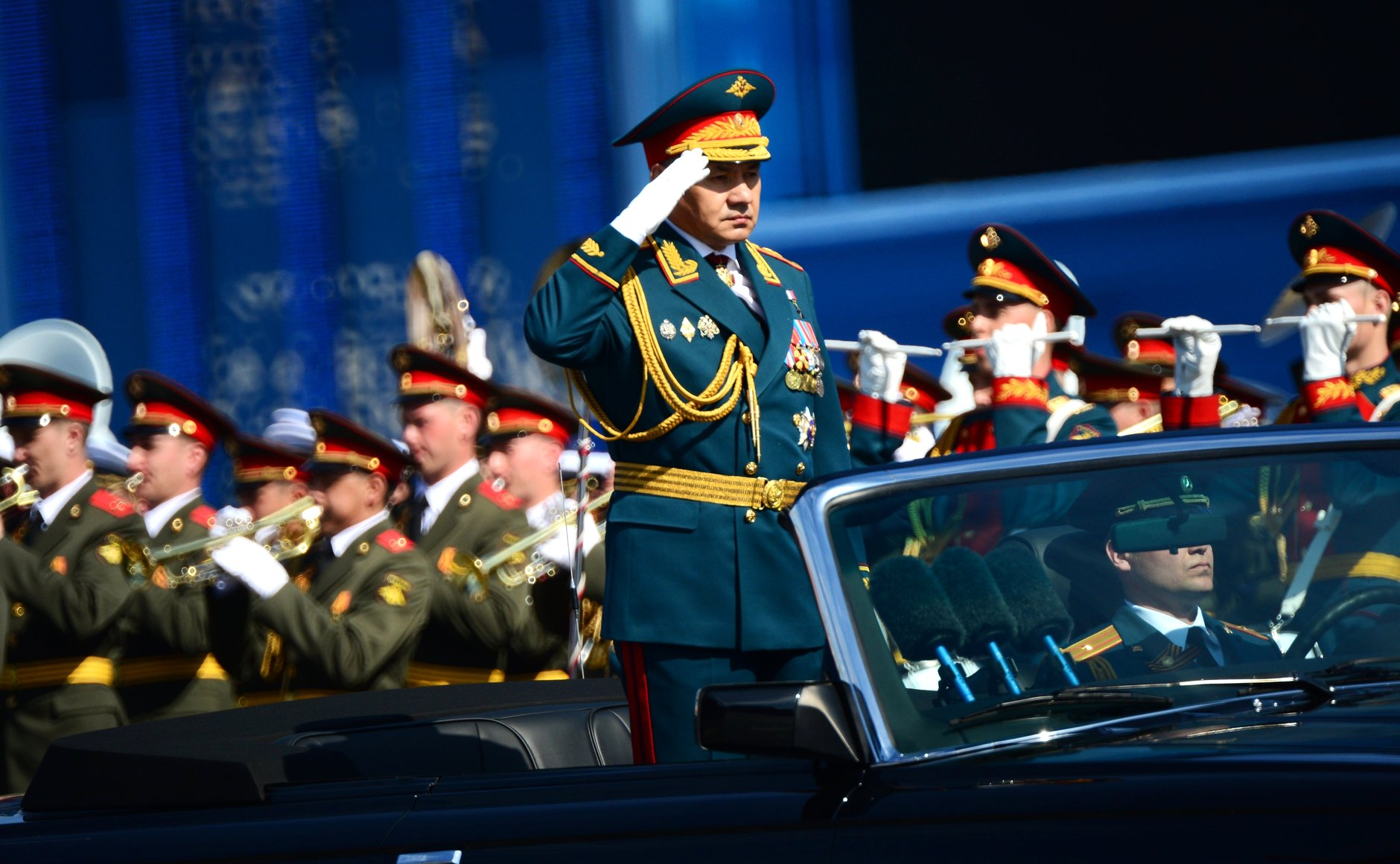
Defense Minister Sergey Shoygu inspecting the parade

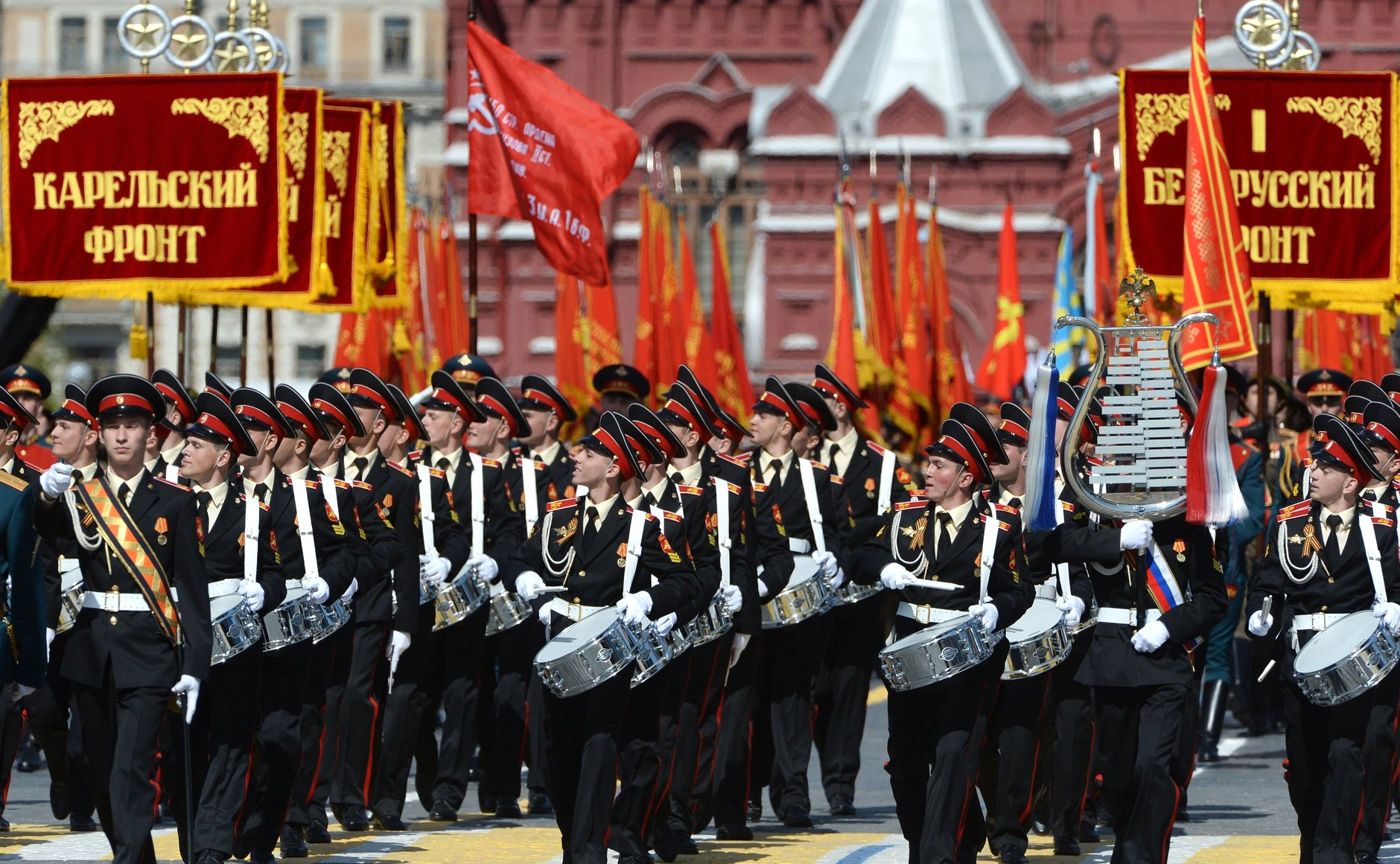
Russian drummers with historical units marching behind them

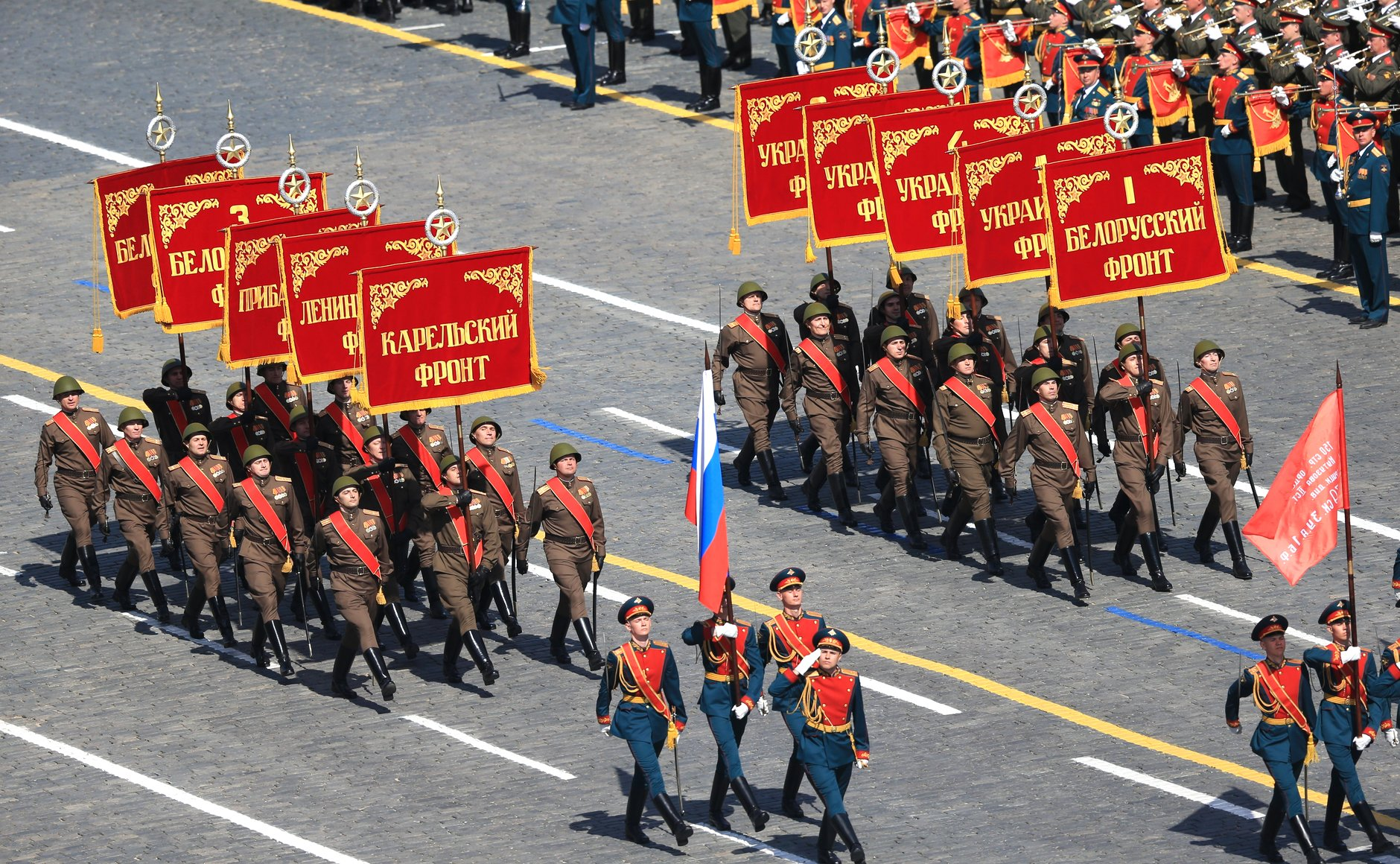
Historical units holding the banners of Soviet Army groups

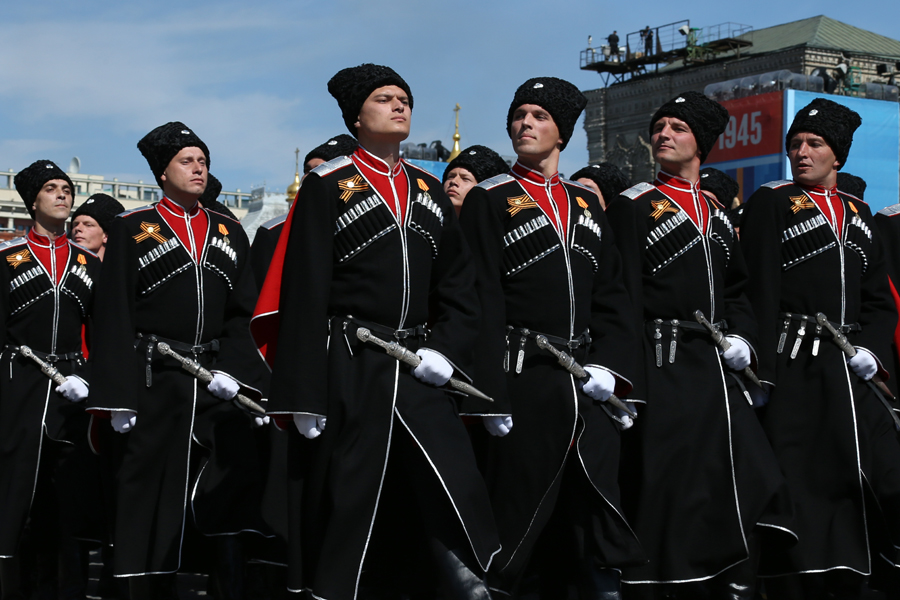
Historical Cossack units during the parade

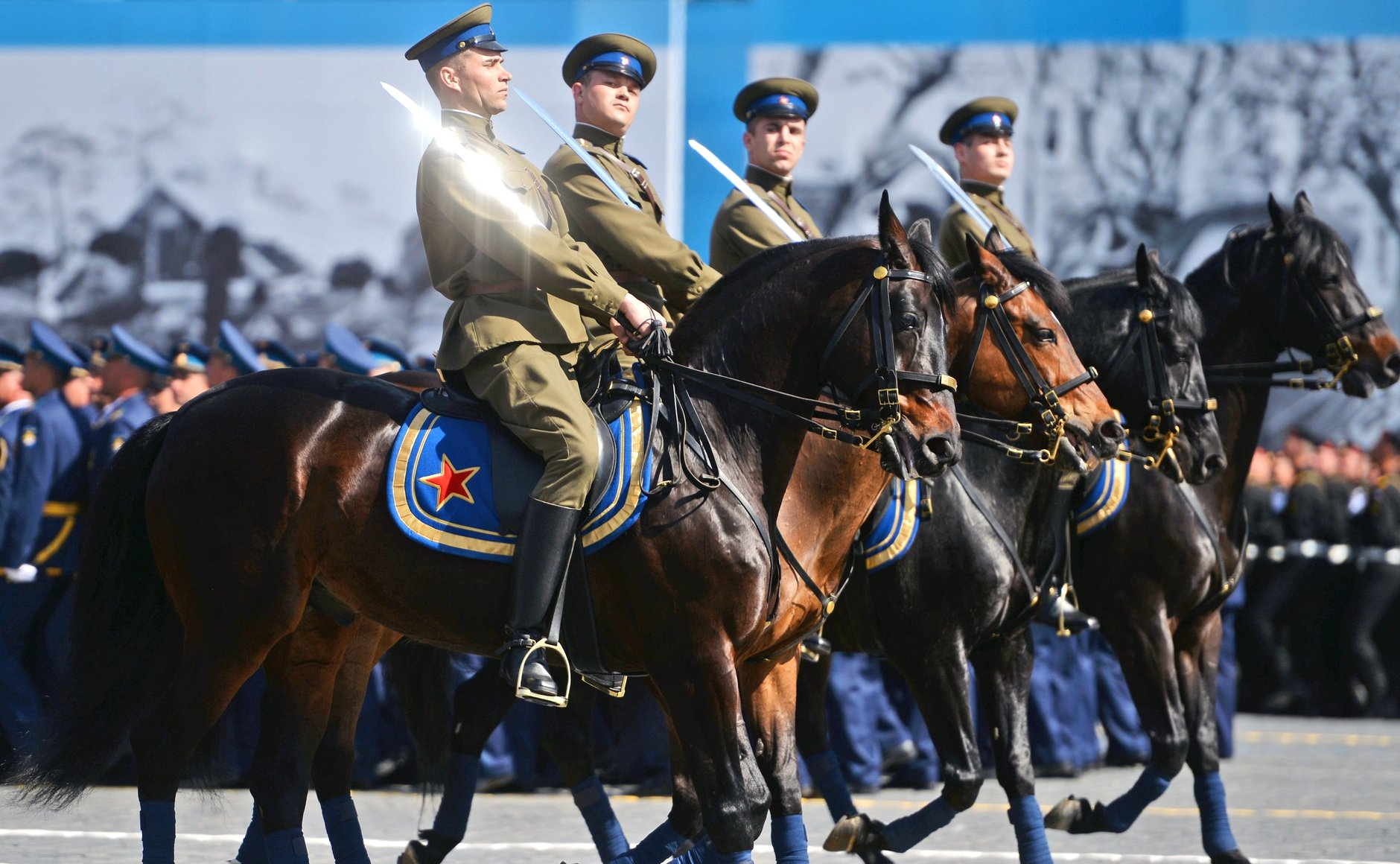
Historical Cavalry units during the parade

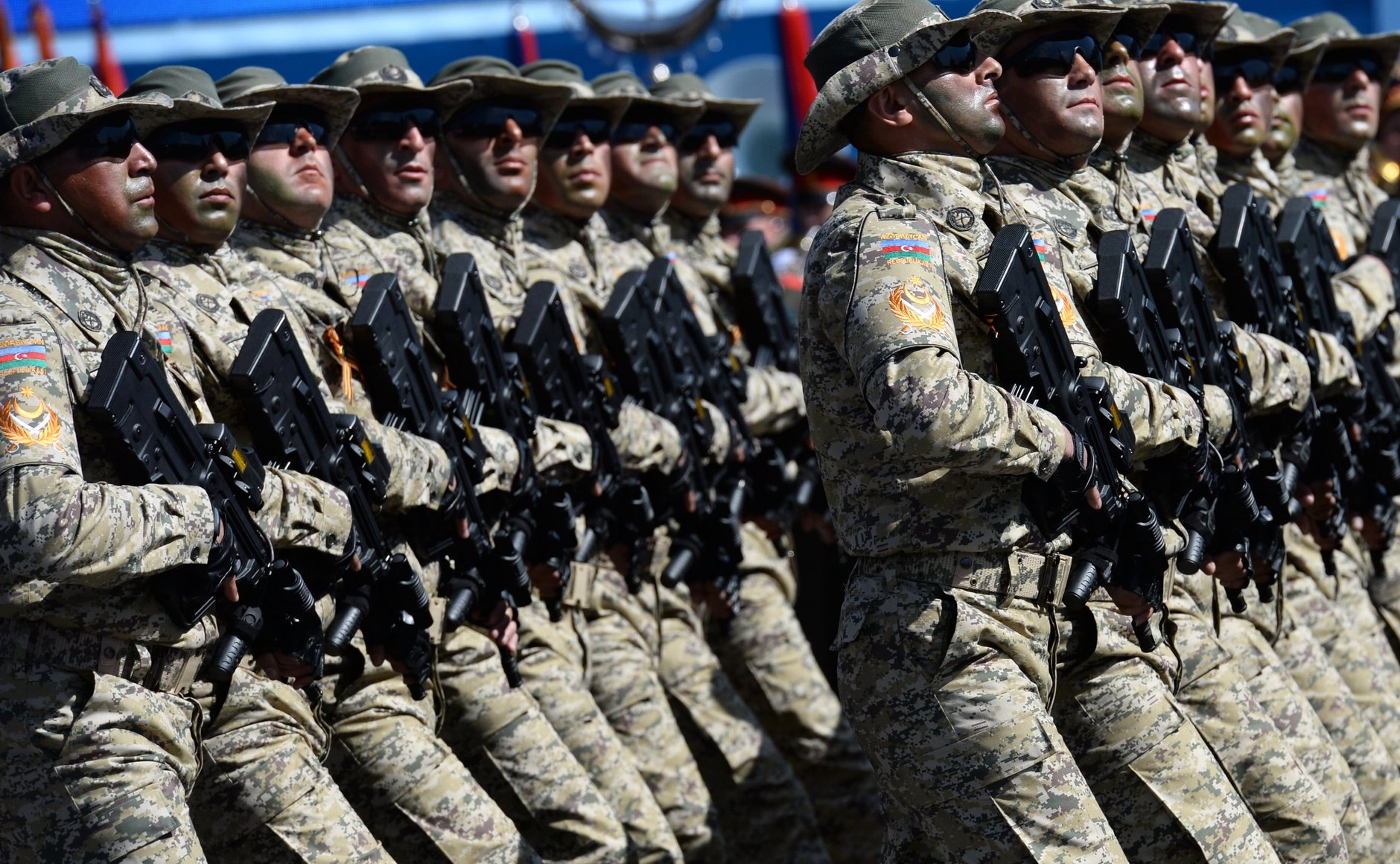
Contingent from the Special Forces of Azerbaijan

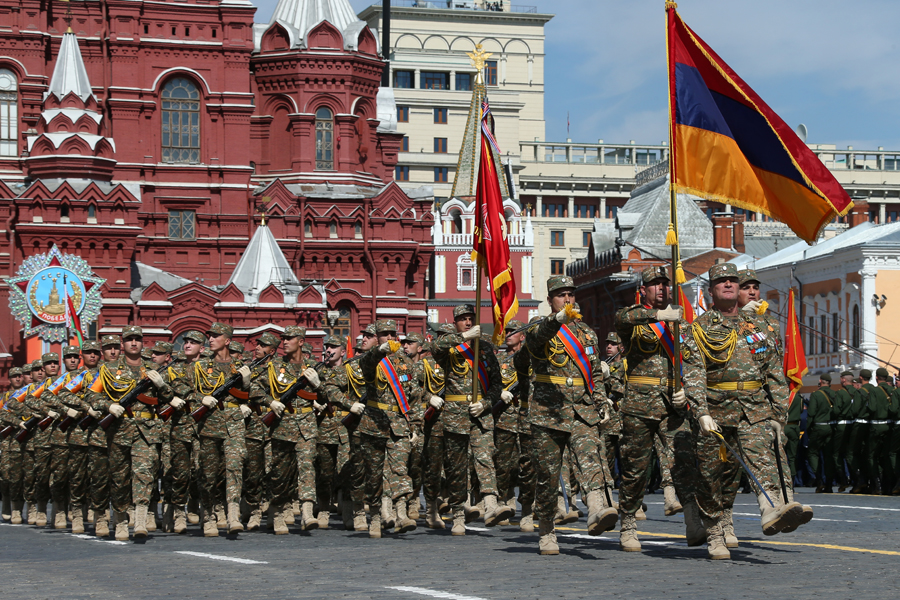
Contingent from the Armed Forces of Armenia

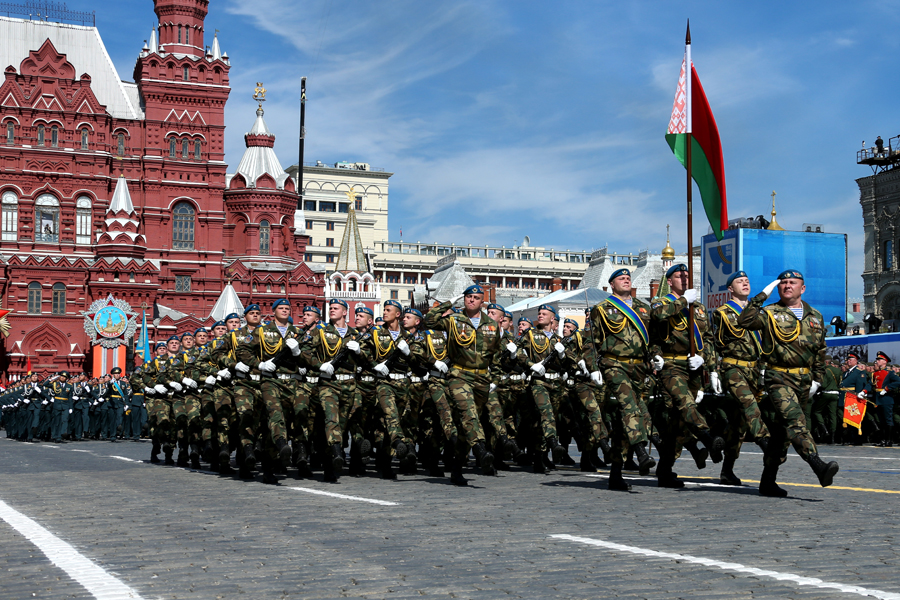
Contingent from the Armed Forces of Belarus

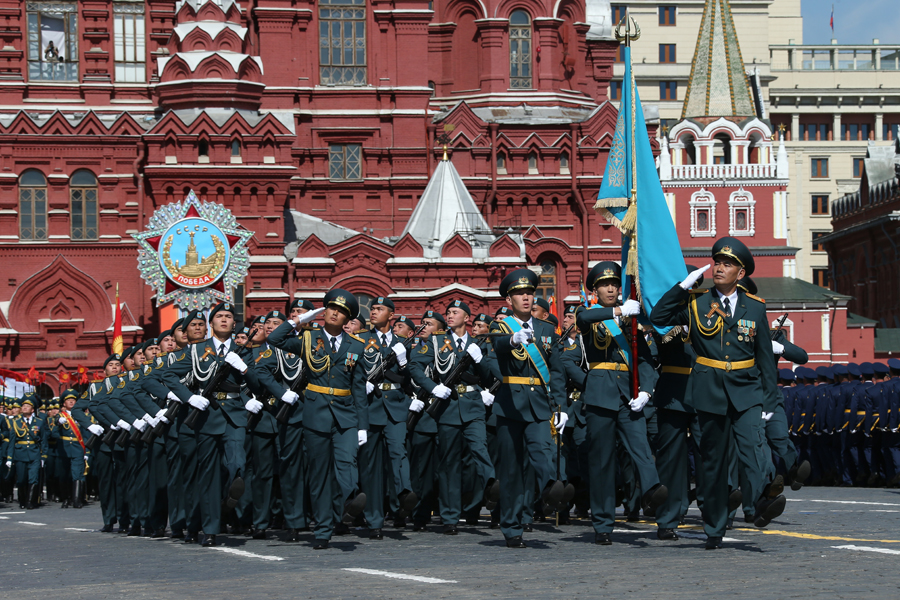
Contingent from the Kazakh Armed Forces

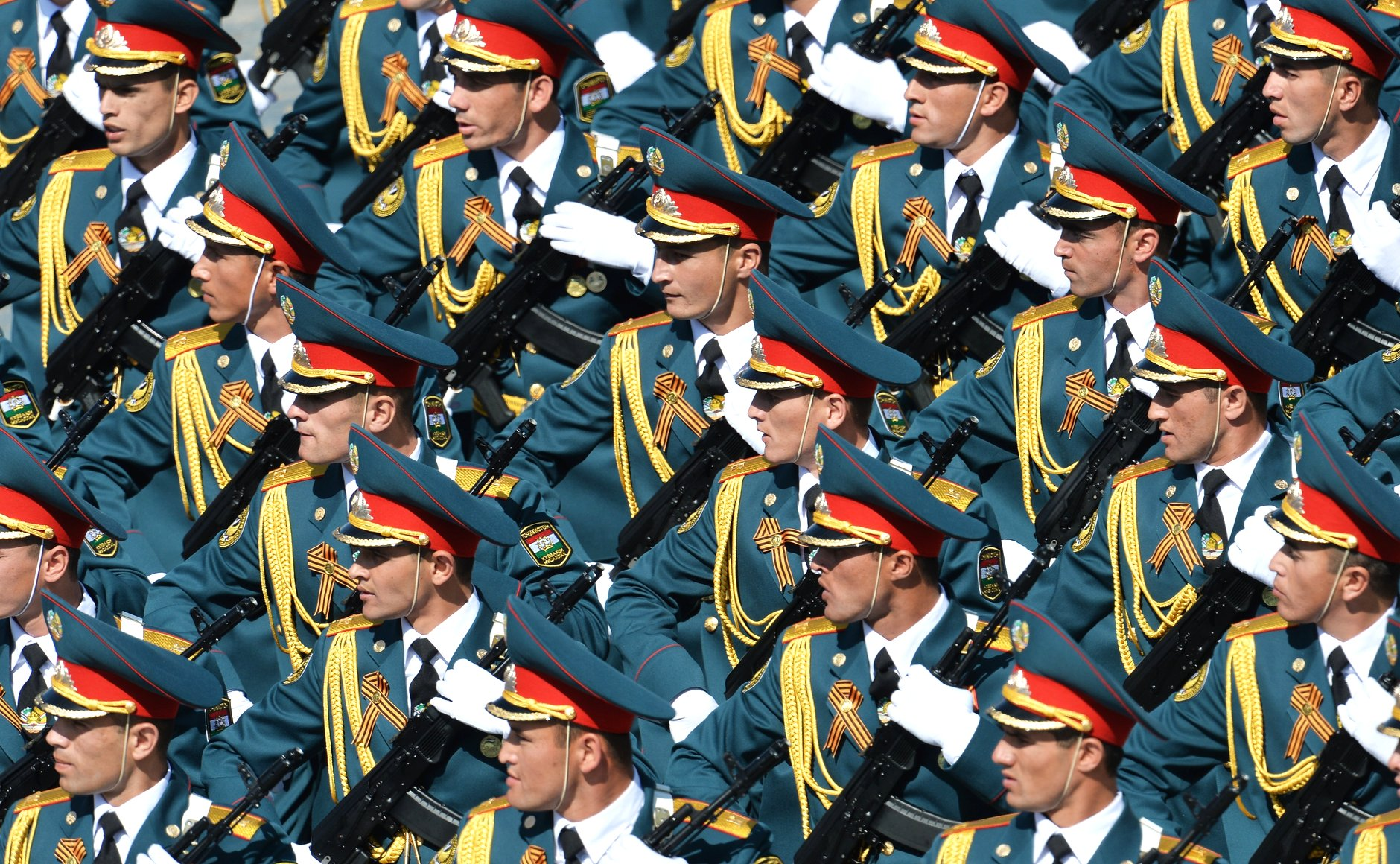
Contingent from the Tajik National Army

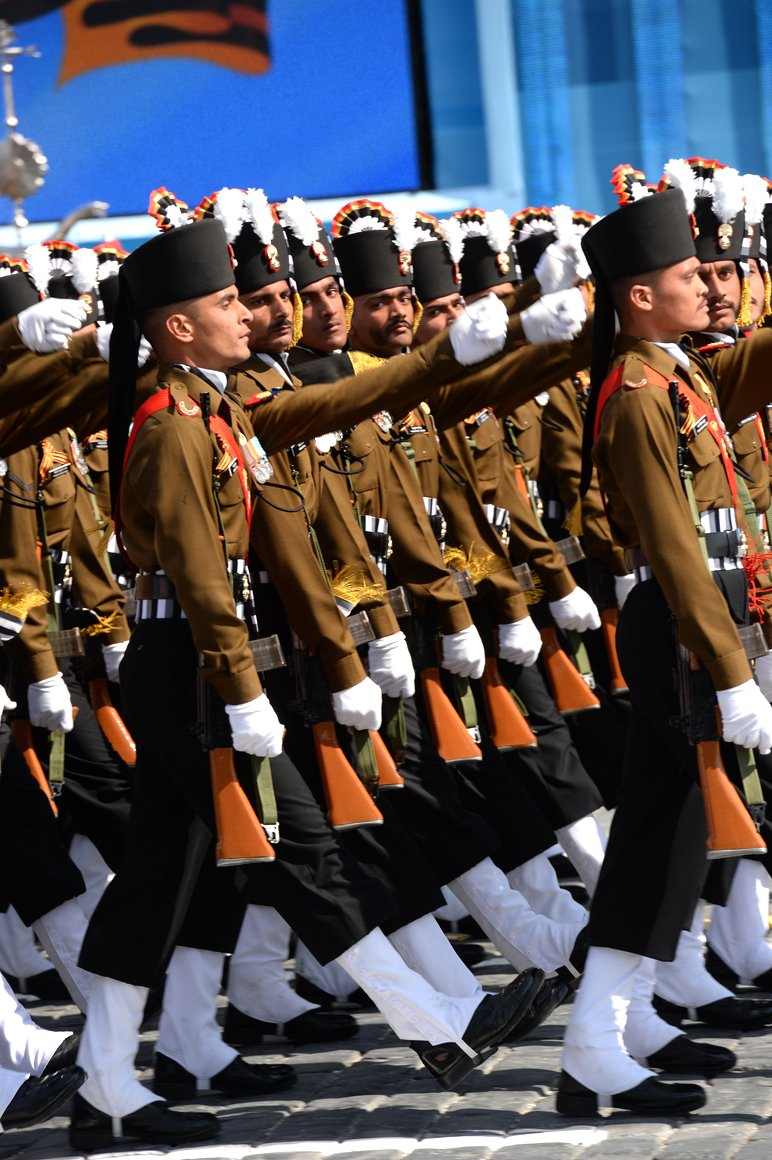
Contingent from the Indian Army

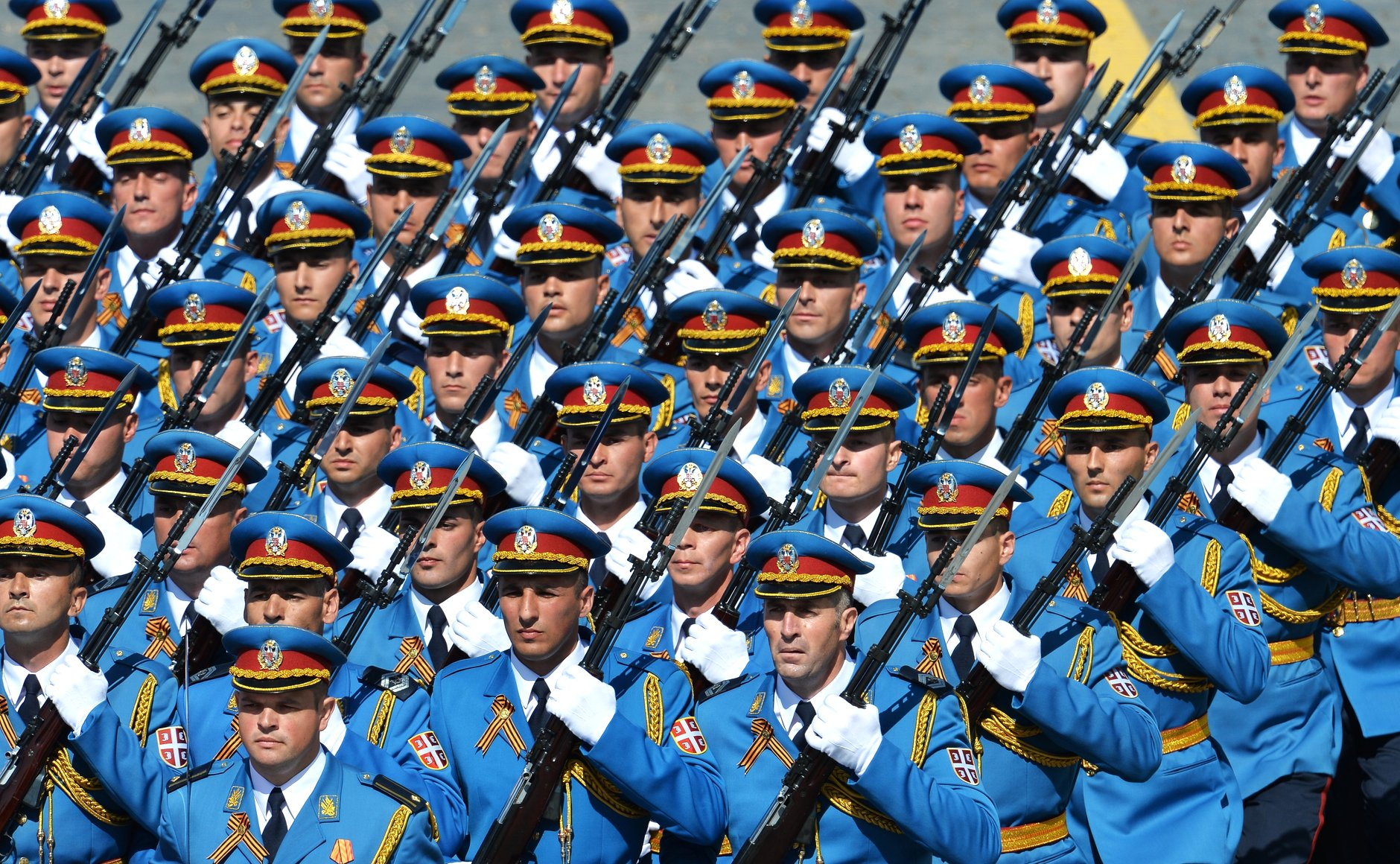
Contingent from the Serbian Army

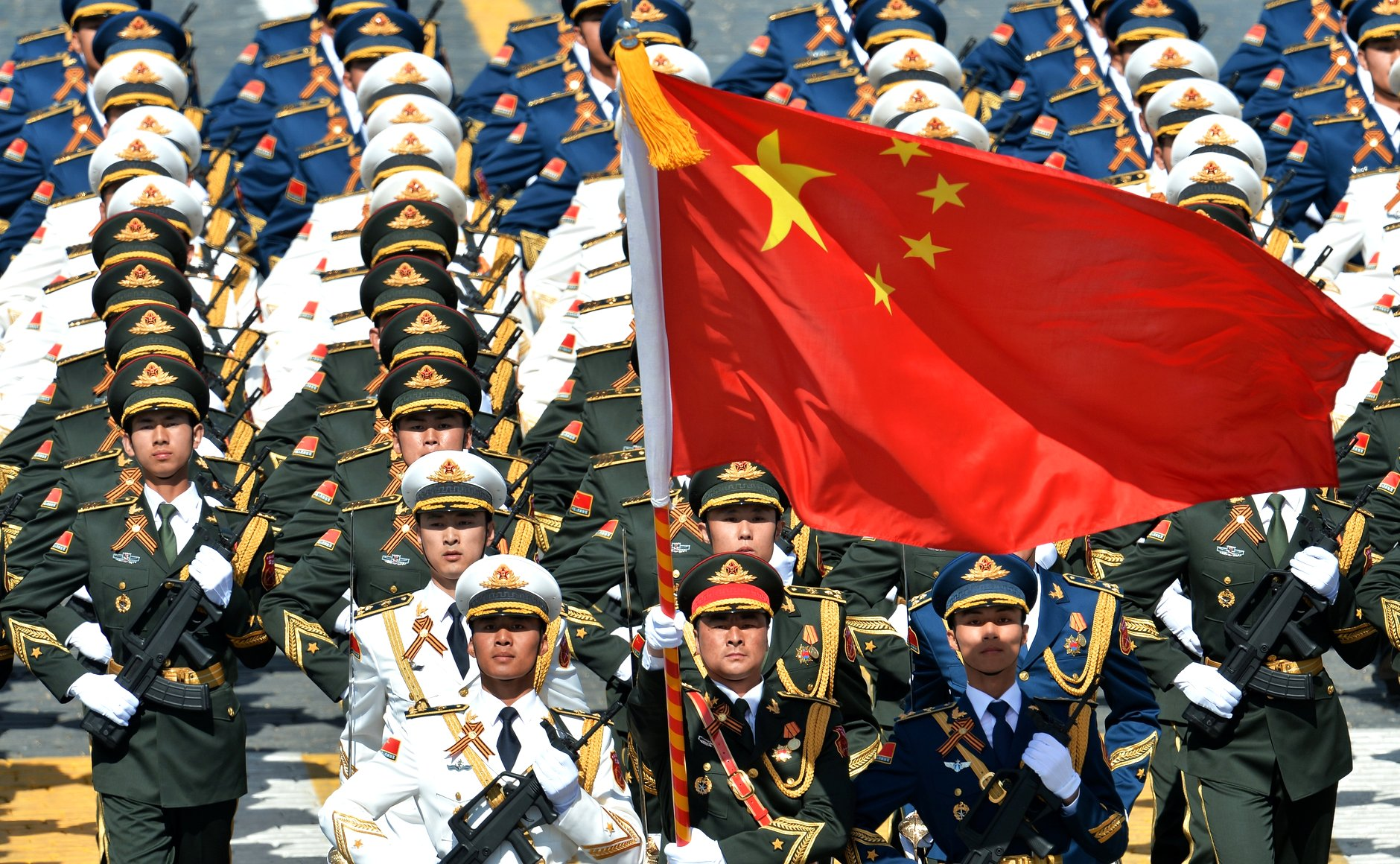
Contingent from the People's Liberation Army Ground Force

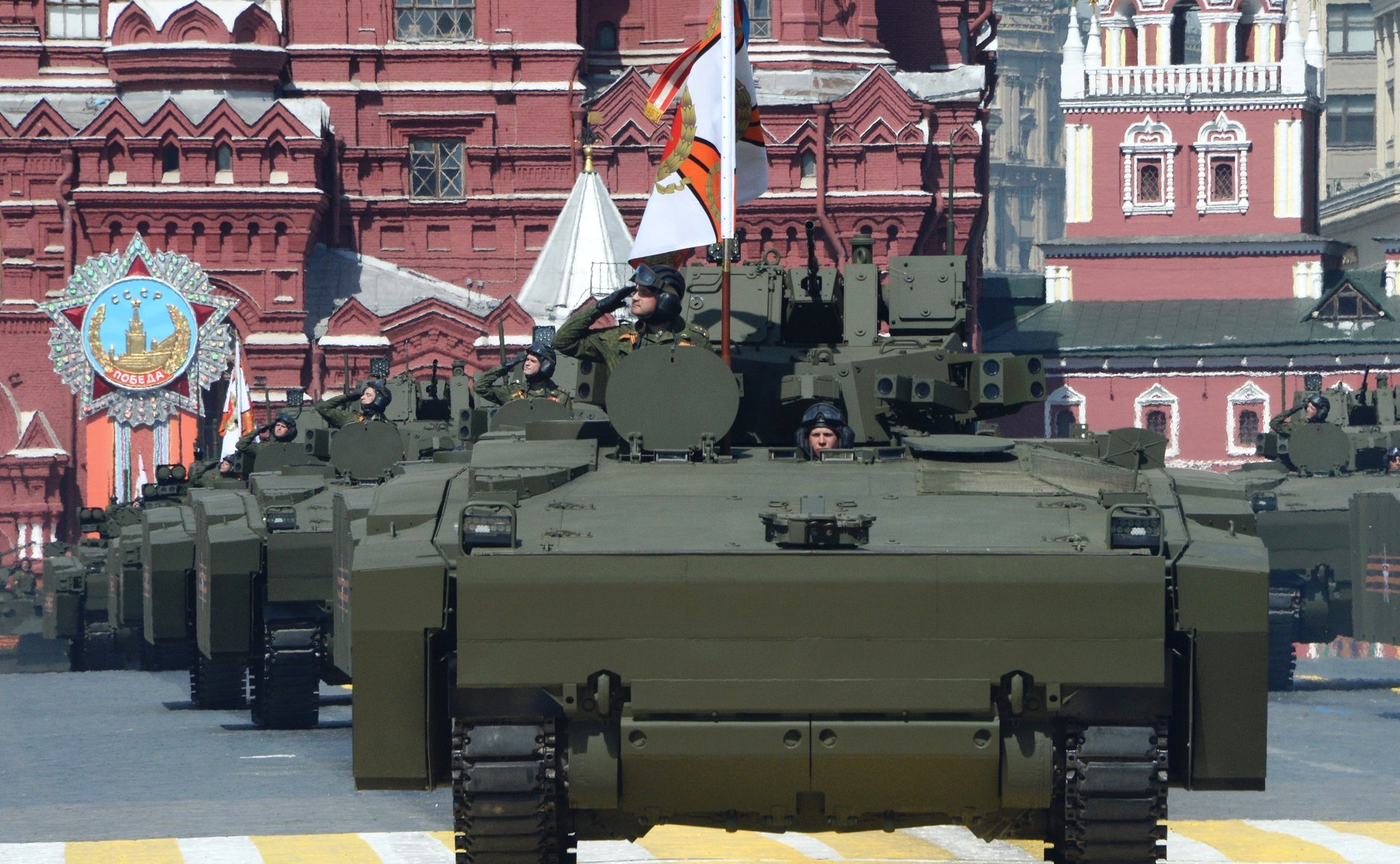
Kurganets-25 APC (front) and IFV (rear) variants during the parade

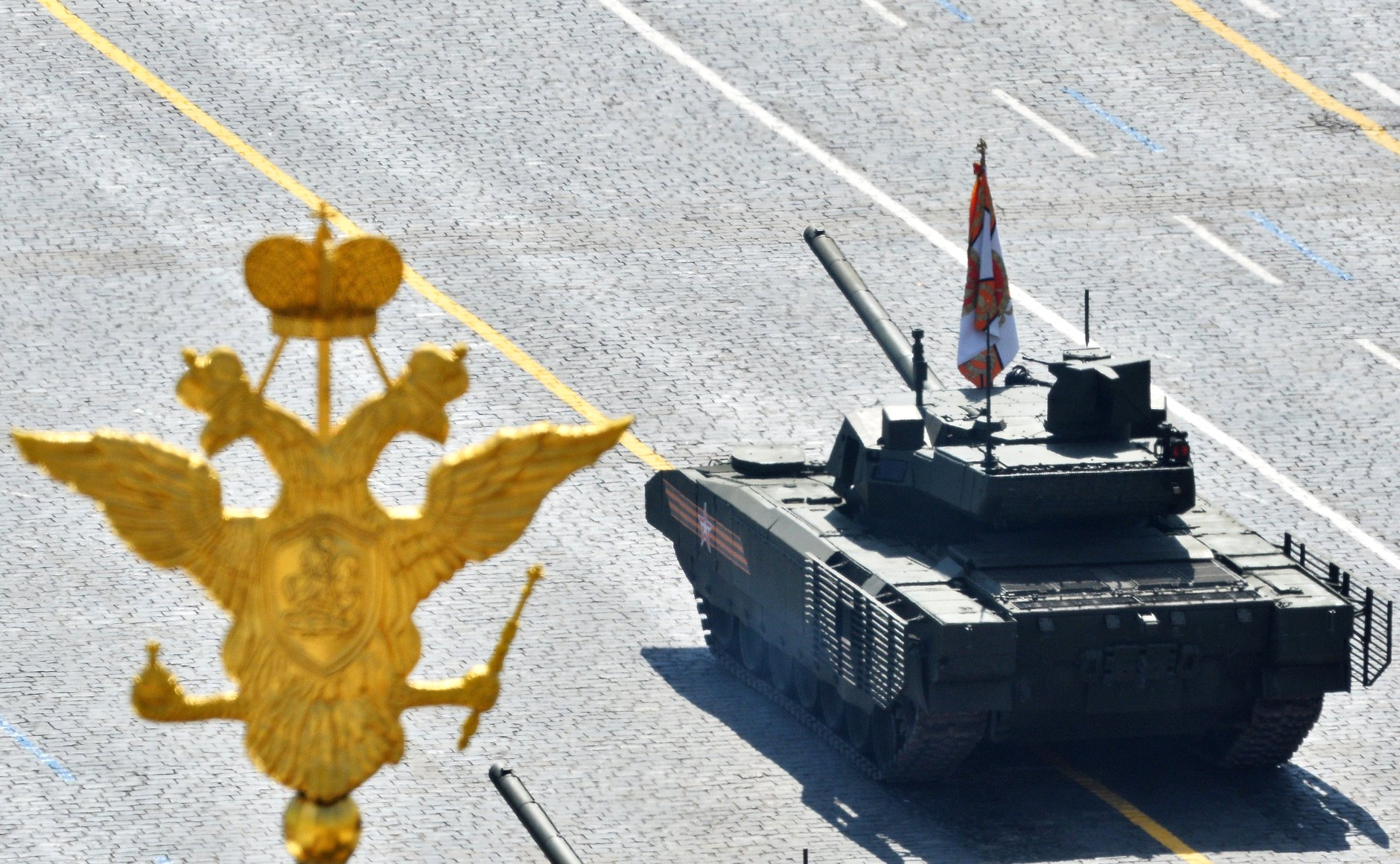
T-14 tank on Red Square during the parade

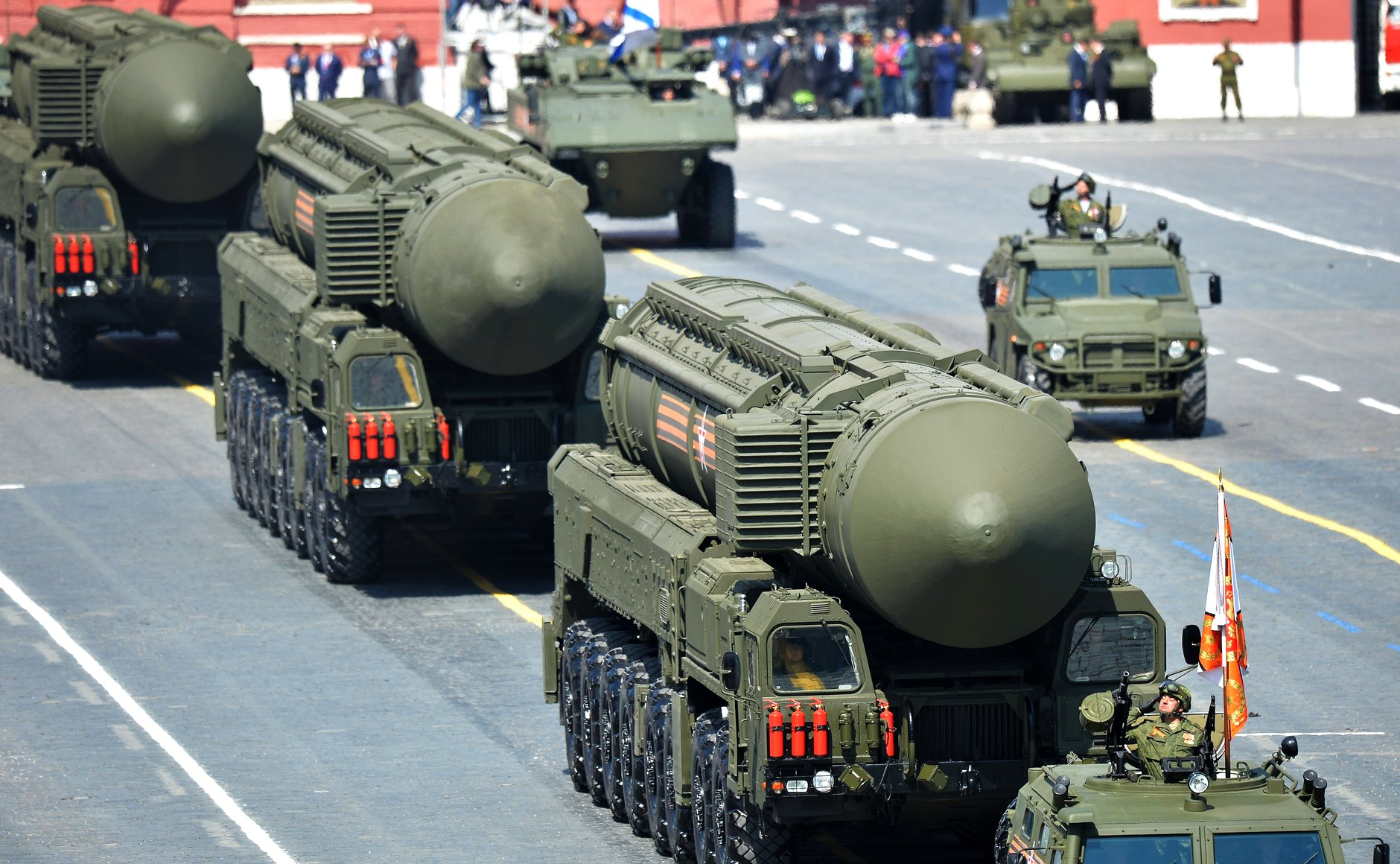
RS-24s escorted by GAZ Tigrs and Bumerang APCs behind them

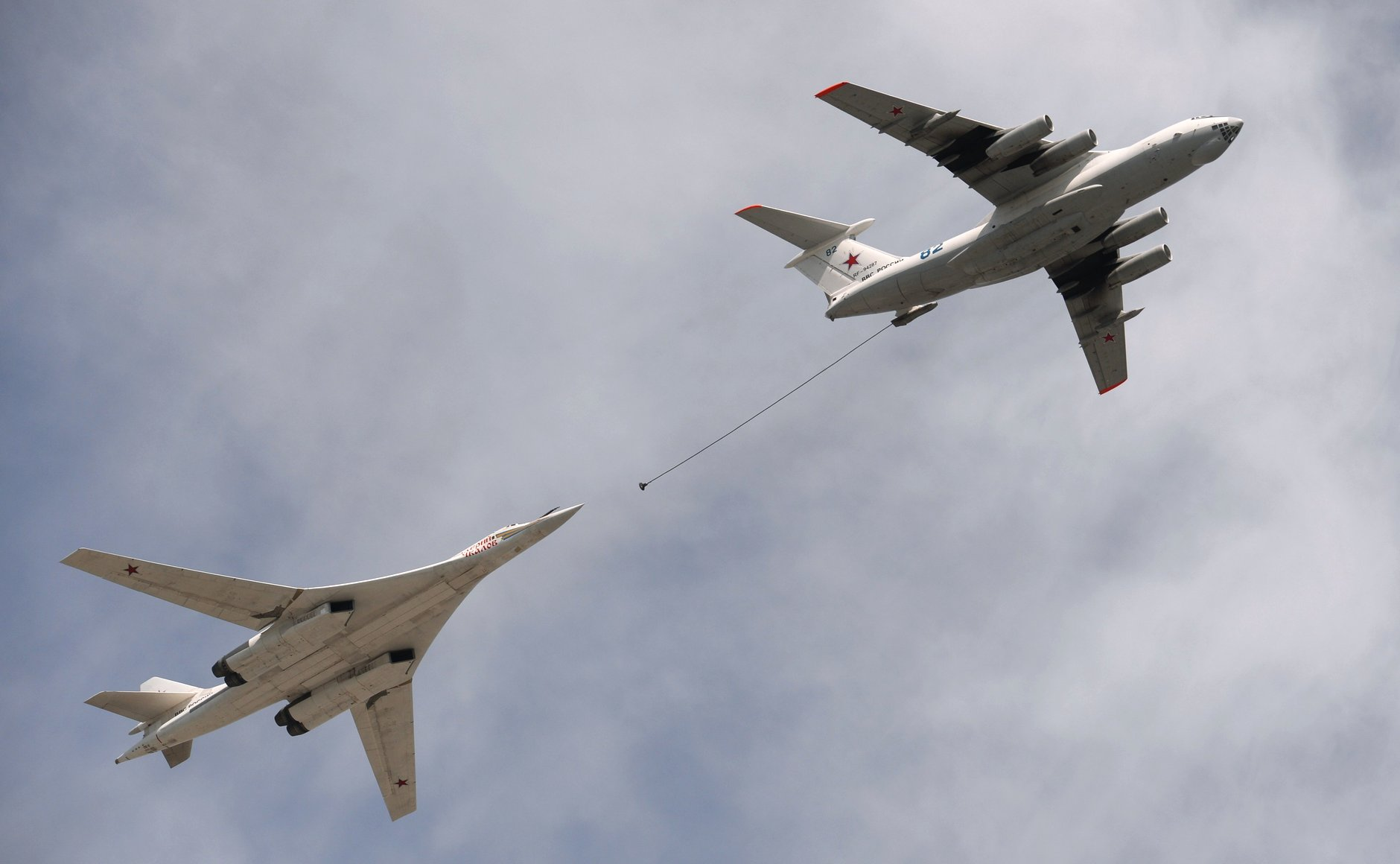
Strategic bomber Tu-160 with refueling Il-78 during the parade

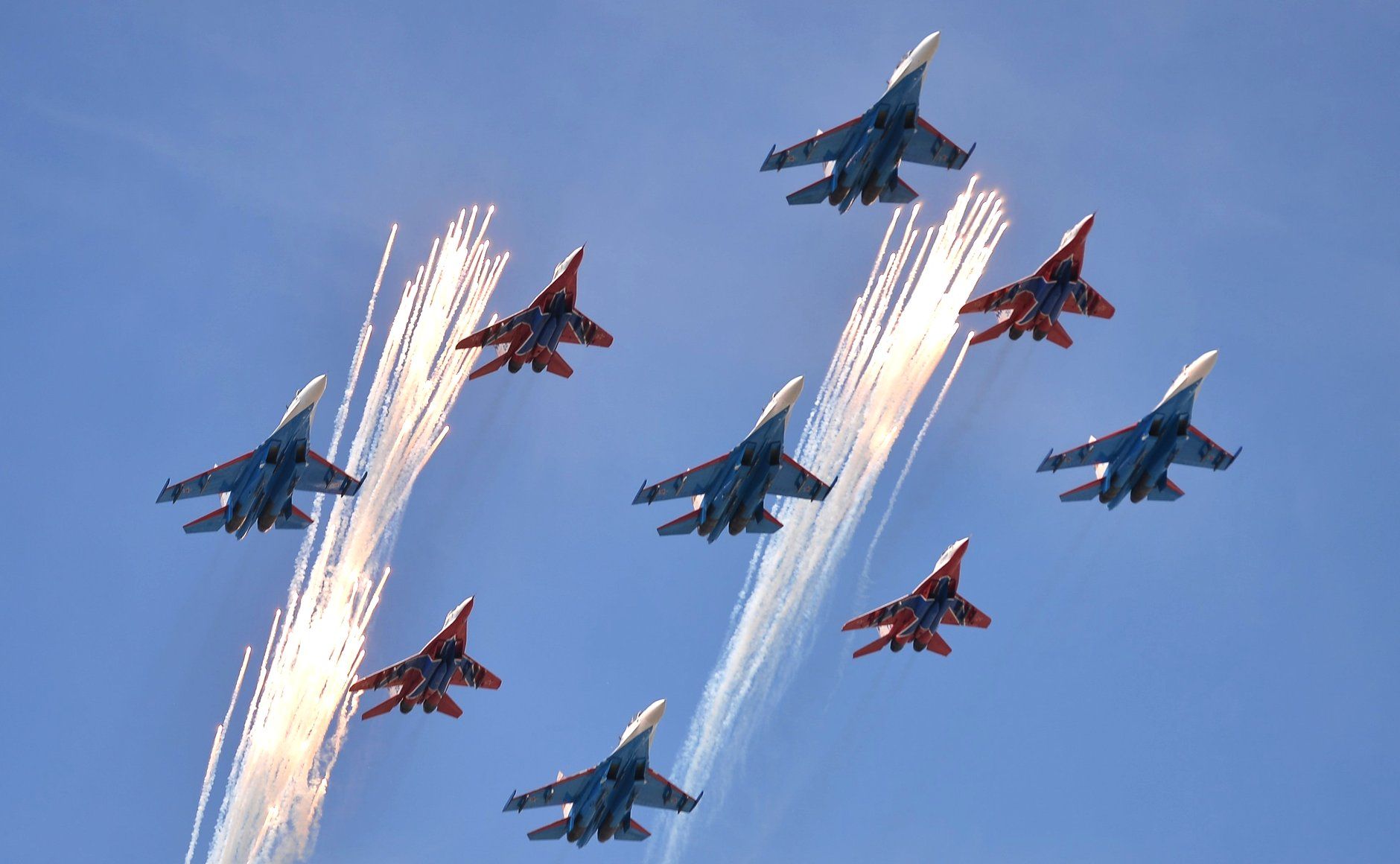
Russian Knights and Strizhi over the Red Square

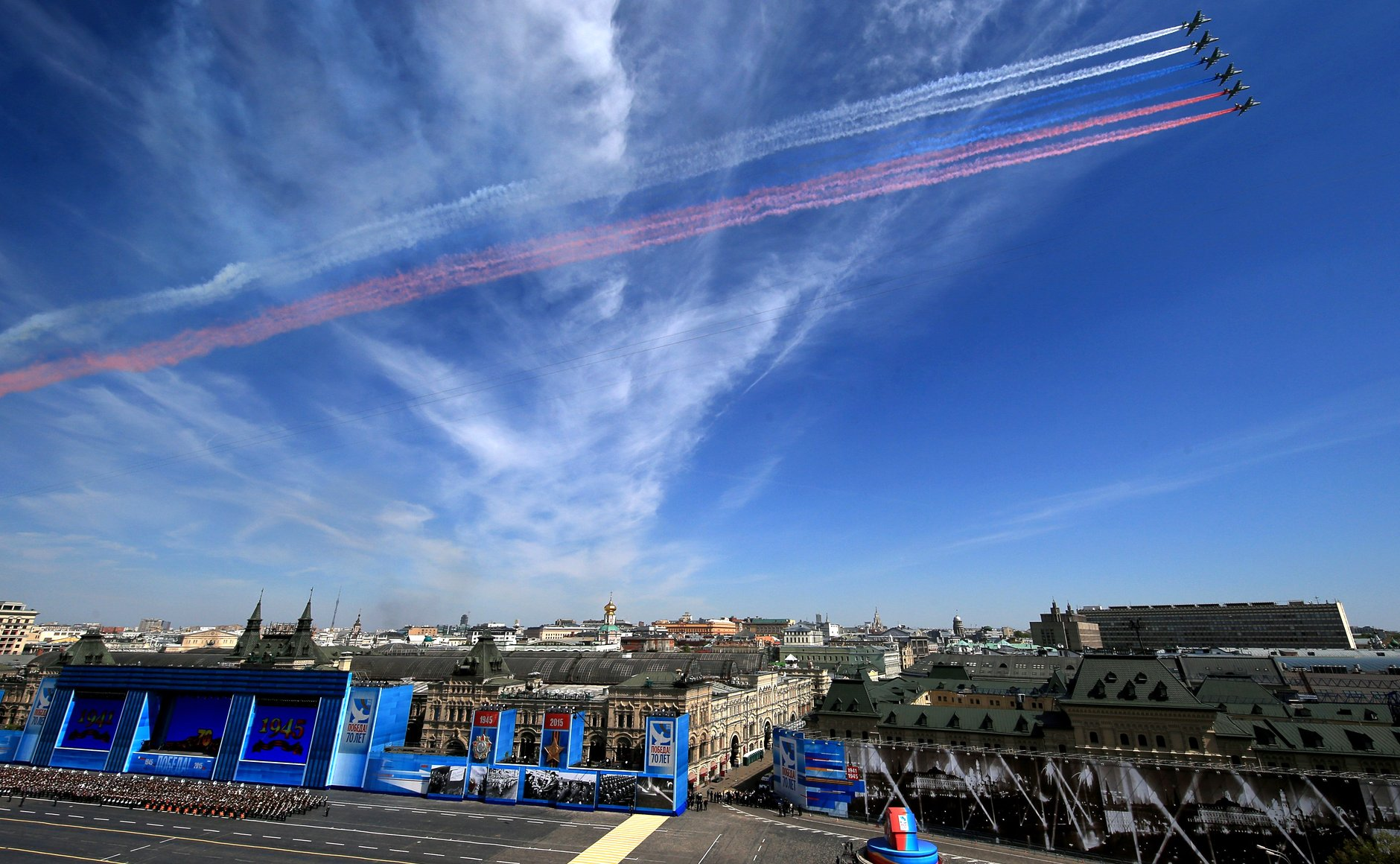
Su-25s coloring the sky with the Russian flag

== See also ==
- 2015 Chinese Victory Day Parade
- Moscow Victory Parade of 1945
- Victory Day (9 May)
- Webpage for the 2015 Victory Day Parade
- 2015 Minsk Victory Day Parade
