= T-15 Armata =

Russian heavy infantry fighting vehicle

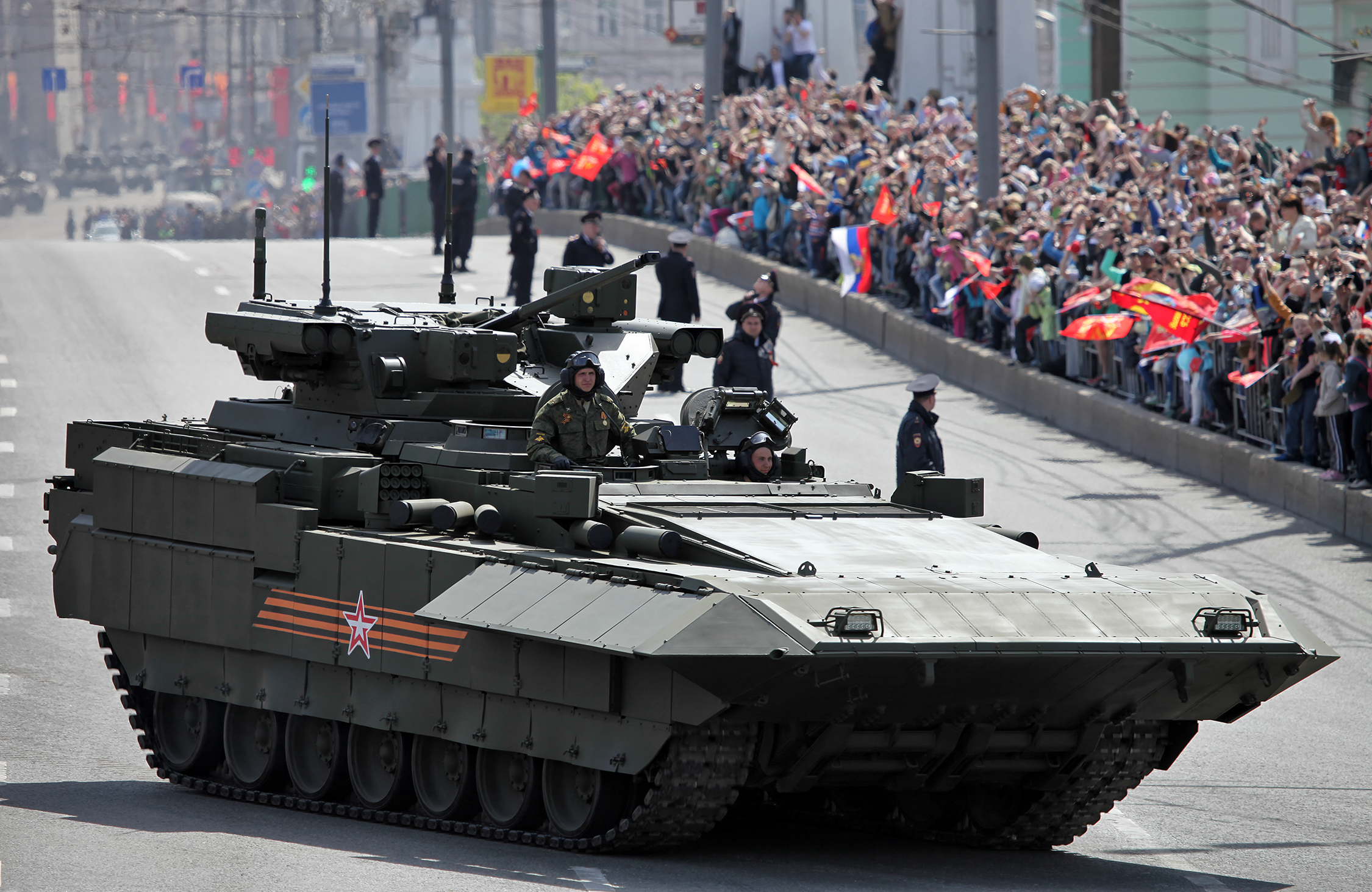
- Russian army T-15 Armata during the 2015 Moscow Victory Day Parade
- Type: Heavy IFV (HIFV)
- Place of origin: Russia

Service history
- Used by: Russian Ground Forces

Production history
- Manufacturer: Uralvagonzavod
- Produced: 2015–present

Specifications
- Mass: 50 tons
- Length: 9.65 m (31.7 ft)
- Armor: Steel and ceramic composite 1,200–1,400 mm vs HEAT
- Main armament: Bumerang-BM remote weapon station turret with 30 mm automatic cannon 2A42, 9M133 Kornet-EM anti-tank missiles, and PKT 7.62 mm coaxial machine gun with 500 rounds (AP/HE) or DUBM-57 Kinzhal remote weapon station turret with 57mm BM-57 autocannon and Ataka-T anti-tank guided missiles (ATGM) or AU-220M Baikal remote weapon station with BM-57, coaxial PKMT machine gun, and 9M120-1 Ataka ATGM missiles
- Engine: Multifuel diesel engine 12N360; 1,500 hp
- Payload capacity: 8 infantry (+3 crew)
- Transmission: automatic
- Operational range: 550 km (340 mi)
- Maximum speed: 65–70 km/h (40–43 mph) (road)

The T-15 Armata (Russian: T-15 Армата), with industrial designation "Object 149", is a Russian heavy infantry fighting vehicle first seen in public (initially with its turret covered) in 2015 during rehearsals for the Moscow Victory Day Parade. The T-15 concept of a heavy IFV is derived from design of the BTR-T vehicle (based on the T-55 chassis) that never entered military service. As of August 2026, the T-15 Armata has not entered service.

== Background ==
The infantry fighting vehicle concept was first conceived of in the 1960s during the Cold War, where a confrontation between NATO and Warsaw Pact countries was expected to be dominated by tanks, so infantry required transport to sustain the pace of advance while having armament to fight tanks, and armor to withstand machine gun and artillery fire; the Soviet Union created the BMP-1/BMP-2 and the United States the M2 Bradley. While IFVs provided troops with heavier mounted firepower, the prevalence of anti-tank launchers and guided missiles made it uneconomical to protect them from such weapons. Post-Cold War, rather than maneuver warfare, most fighting took place in urban areas, such as what the Russians experienced in Grozny. While heavy losses can be tolerated in a near-peer conflict, the ease at which insurgent ambushes using anti-tank weaponry can inflict casualties by targeting IFVs has become an issue for IFV operators. In an effort to field better protected troop carriers, some countries have experimented with converting tank hulls to carry dismounted infantry, such as Israel with the Namer.

The Russian T-15 is based on the T-14 tank hull, with its engine relocated to the front to accommodate a passenger compartment in the rear. This adjusted engine position provides additional crew protection against frontal attacks. Passenger capacity is estimated at between seven and nine troops. At 48 tons, the vehicle is slightly heavier than the T-90 main battle tank. It has a built-in entrenching blade and the T-14's numerous cameras and sensors.

== Design ==
=== Armament ===
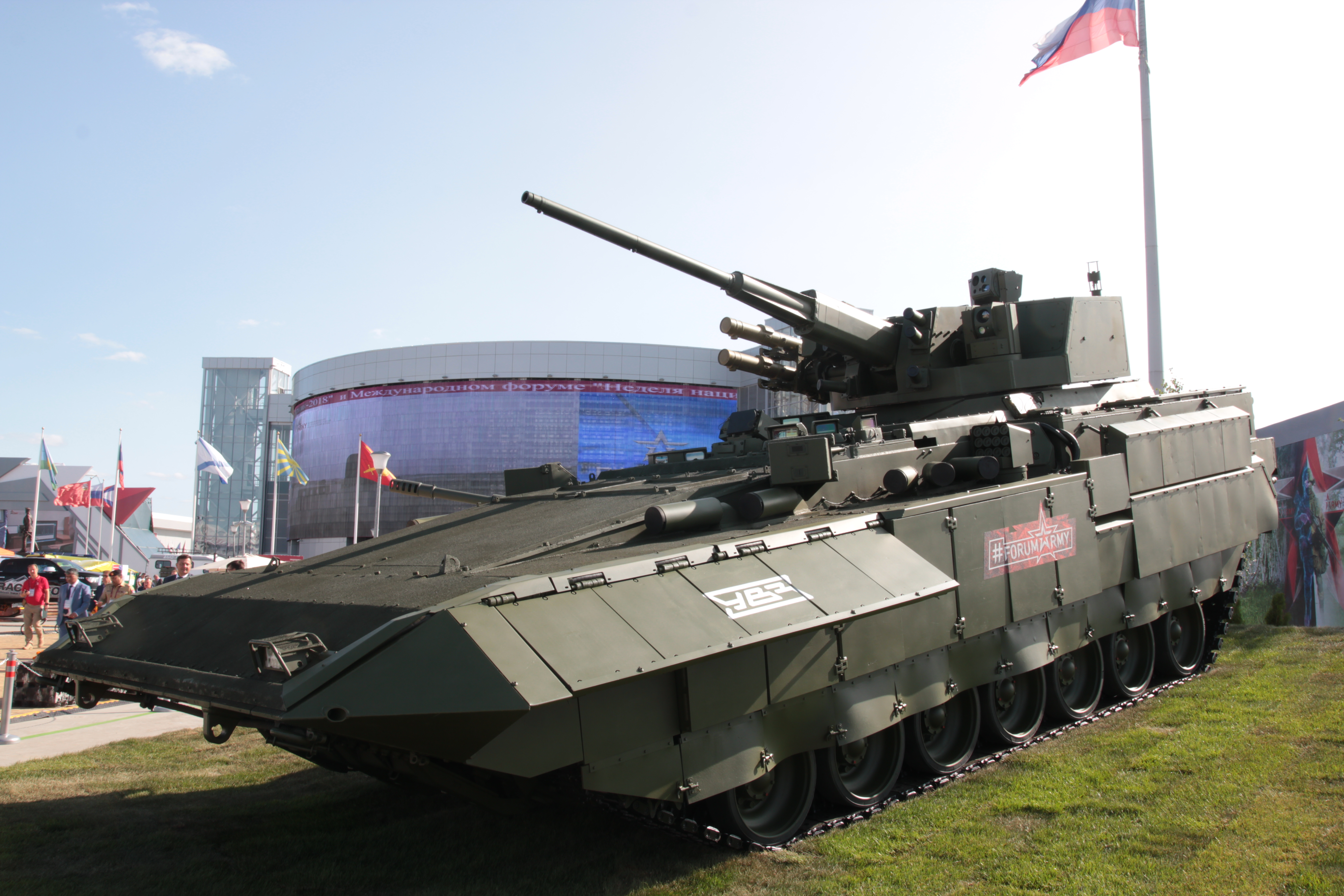
A Russian Army Т-15 with module АU-220М armed with 57mm BM-57 autocannon.

The T-15 Armata can be fitted with:

- The Bumerang-BM (Epoch) remote control weapon station turret with a 2A42 30 mm autocannon, a 7.62 mm coaxial PKT and a bank of two 9M133M Kornet-M anti-tank guided missiles on both sides
- The AU-220M Baikal remote turret that features a 57 mm autocannon BM-57 and the 9M120-1M Ataka guided anti-tank missiles
- DUBM-57 Kinzhal RCWS with BM-57 autocannon, 7.62mm PKMT machine gun, and 9M120-1 Ataka ATGMs

=== Mobility ===
Like the T-14, the T-15 is based on the Armata Universal Combat Platform, but unlike the T-14 it has its engine in the front. It is powered by the new generation 1,500 hp multifuel diesel engine 12N360 coupled with a hydro-mechanical automatic transmission, has a combat weight of about 48 tons, a maximum road speed of 65–70 km/h (40–43 mph), an operational range of 550 km (340 mi), and a power-to-weight ratio of over 30 h.p./t.

=== Protection ===
Like the T-14, the T-15 is protected by reactive armour and the Afganit active protection system. While the T-14 has its Afganit launch tubes at the base of its turret, the T-15 has them arrayed along the top sides of its hull. It uses four soft-kill launchers to deploy smoke grenades that disrupt visual and infrared guidance systems, and five hard-kill launch tubes on top of the hull, compared to the T-14's ten hard-kill tubes on the turret which automatically turns to face a threat.

The floor is reinforced with an added armor plate to protect against land mines and improvised explosive devices (IEDs). It also has a radar jamming and deception system to detonate radio-controlled anti-tank mines, and an NBC protection system.

== Variants ==
- BMP-KSh: Command post variant, has the turret removed and replaced by additional power supply equipment.

== Operators ==
Russia

- Russian Ground Forces

== See also ==
- Armata Universal Combat Platform – (Russia)
- Kurganets-25 – (Russia)
- VPK-7829 Bumerang – (Russia)
- Typhoon (AFV family) – (Russia)
- Namer – (Israel) HAPC on the Merkava chassis
- VN20 – (China) HIFV developed from the VT-4 chassis
- Borsuk IFV – (Poland)
- T-14 Armata – (Russia)
- Vikram VT21 – (India)

== Image gallery ==
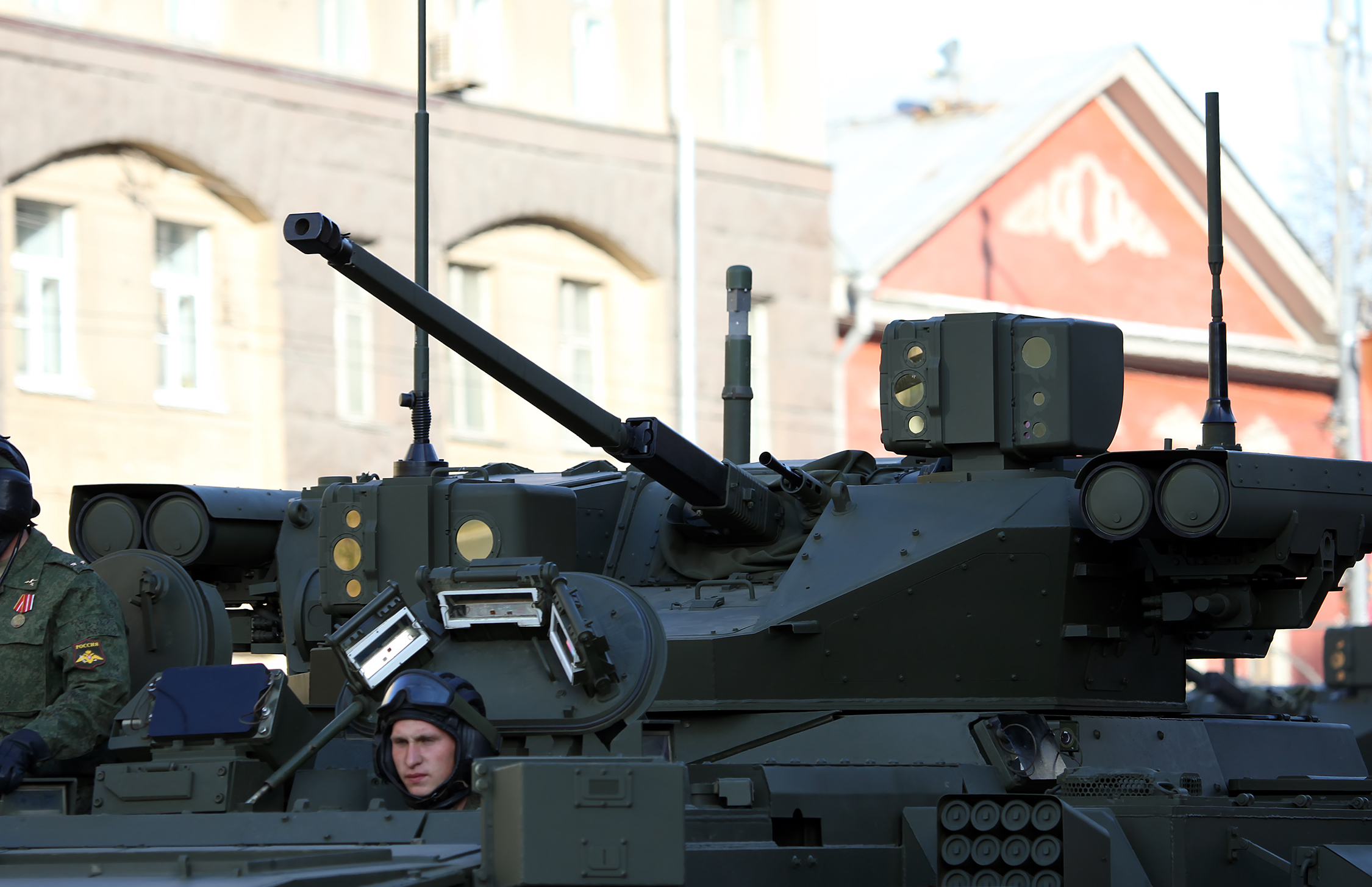
Close-up of turret

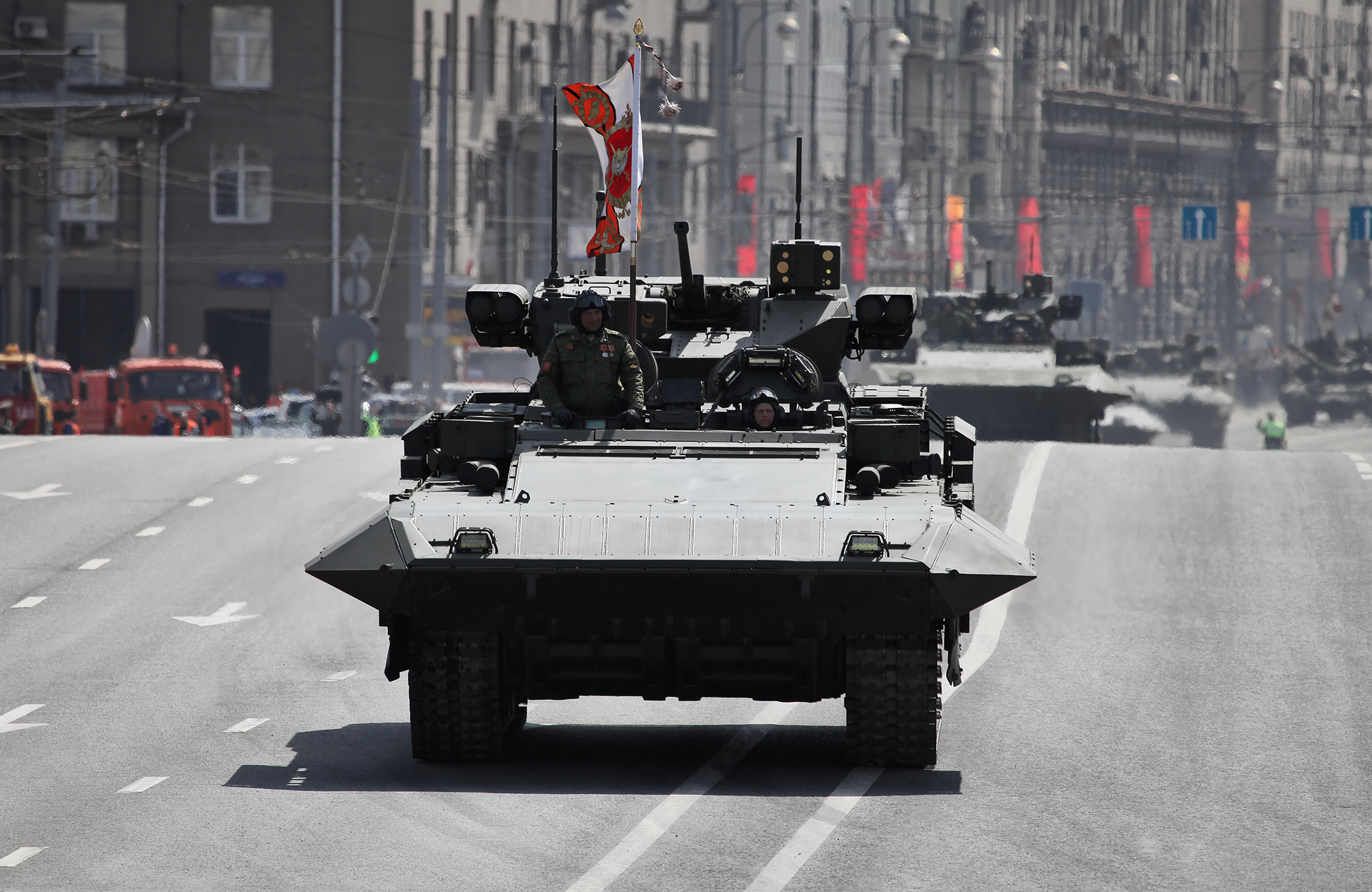
Front view

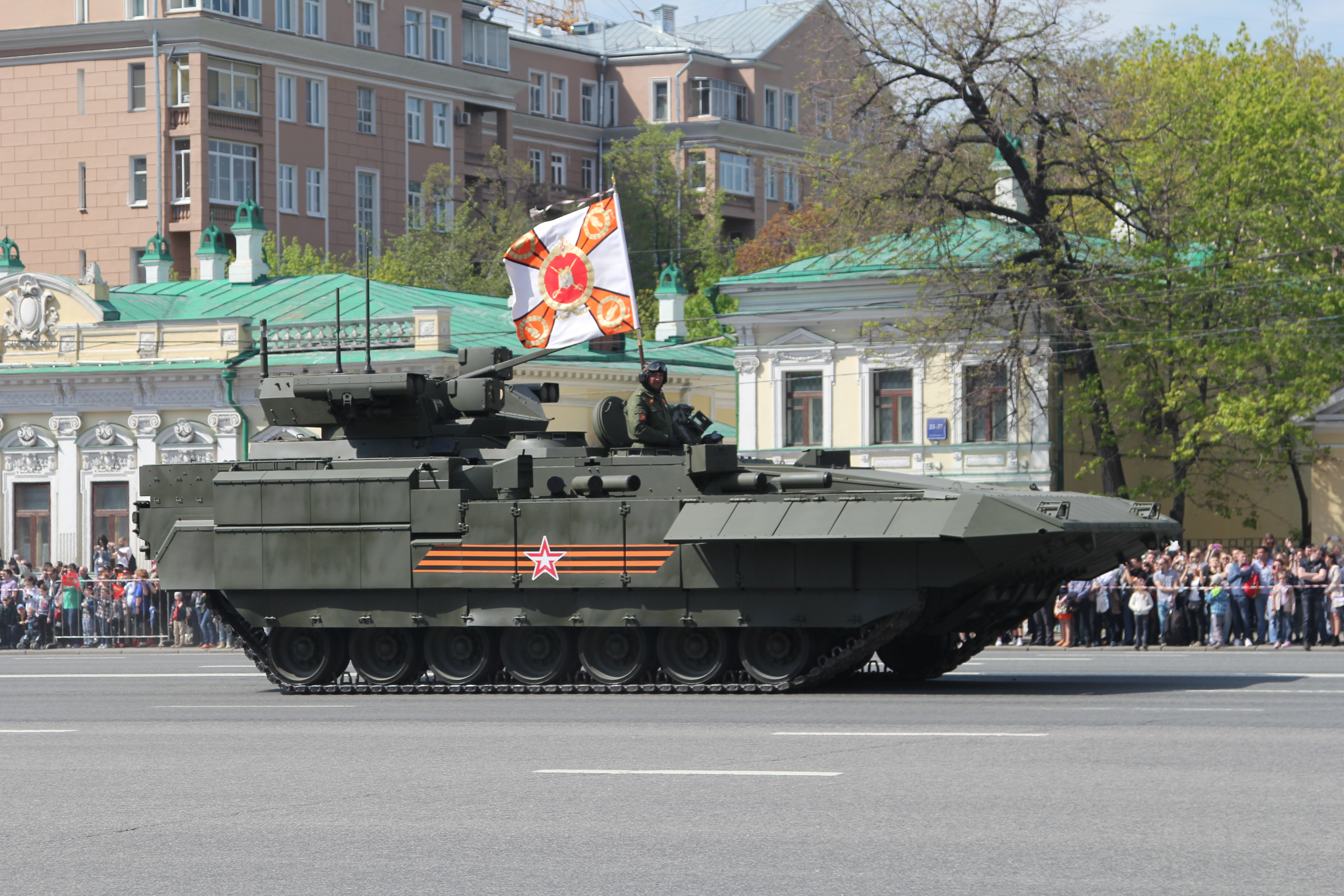
Side view

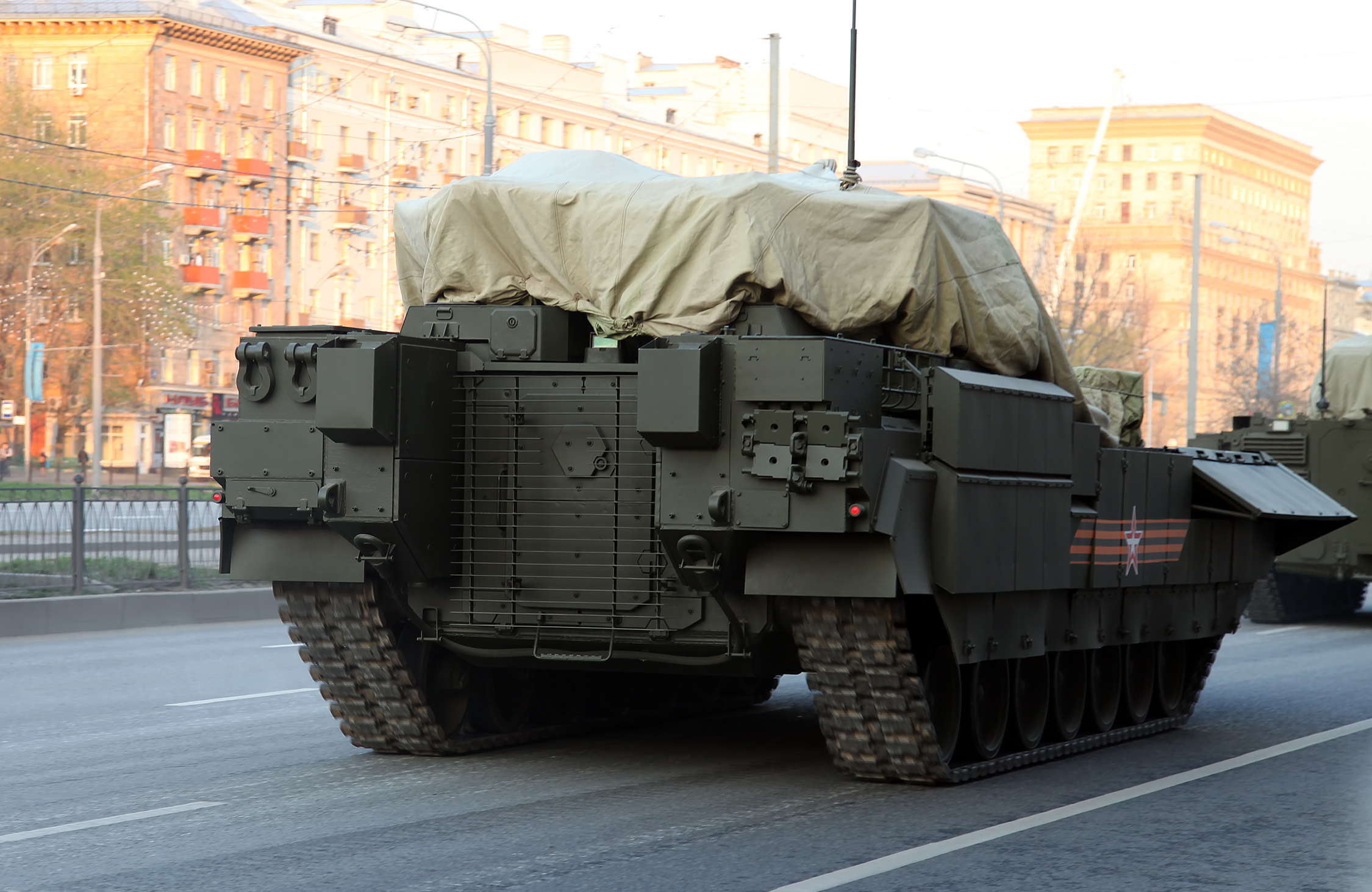
Rear view with the rear ramp door

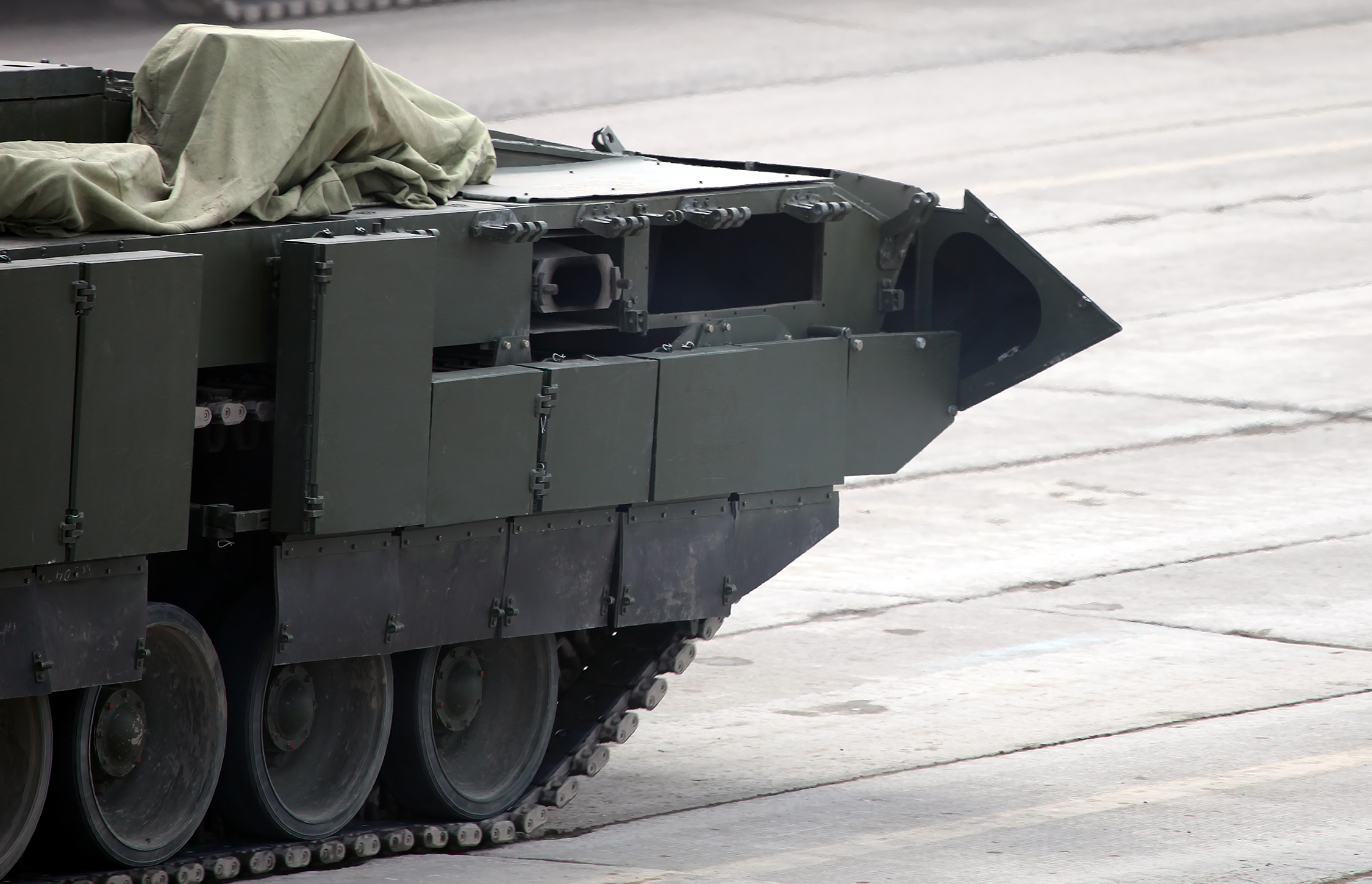
Close-up of engine exhaust ports in the front
