= Kurganets-25 =

Russian infantry fighting vehicle

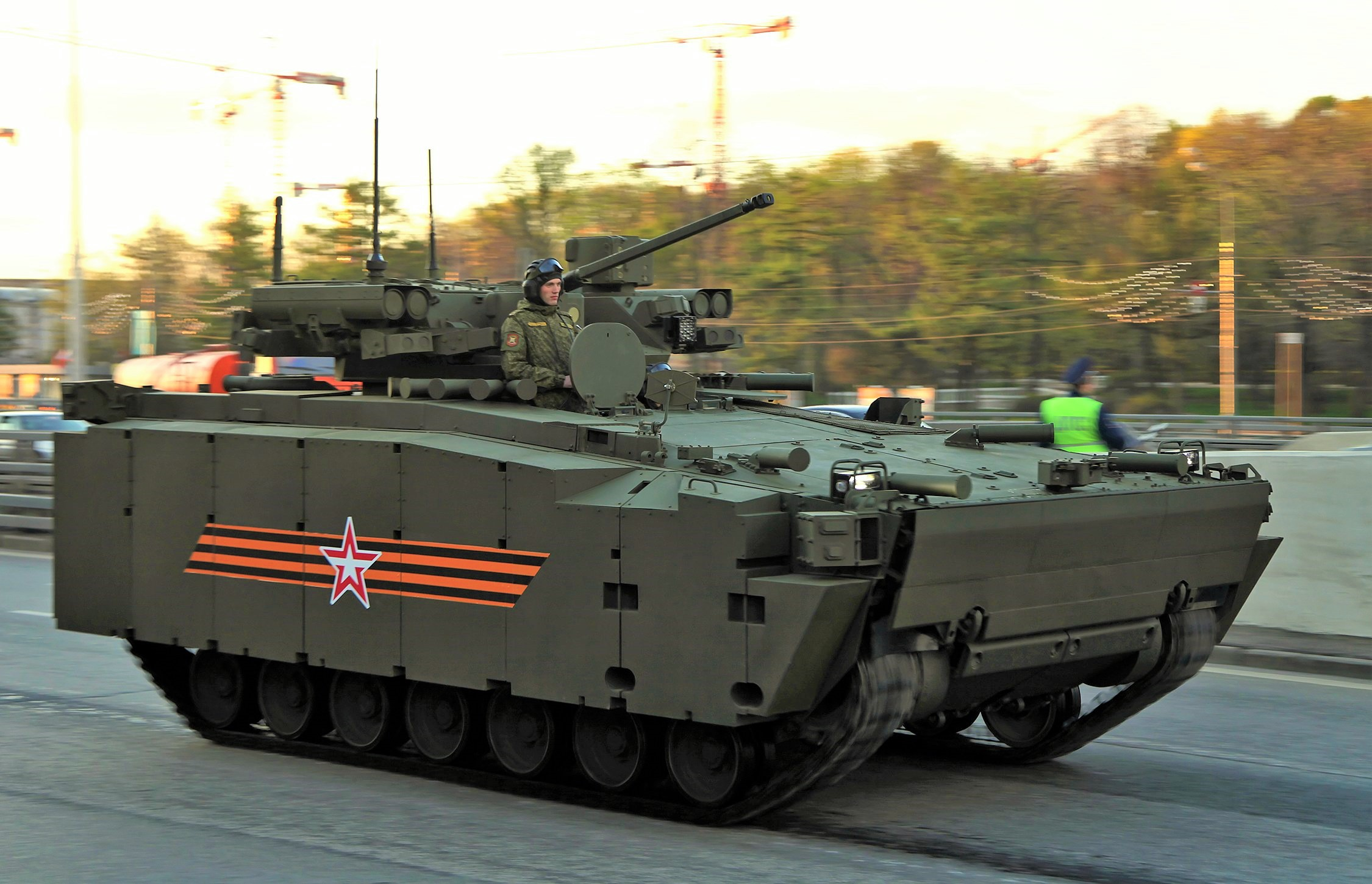
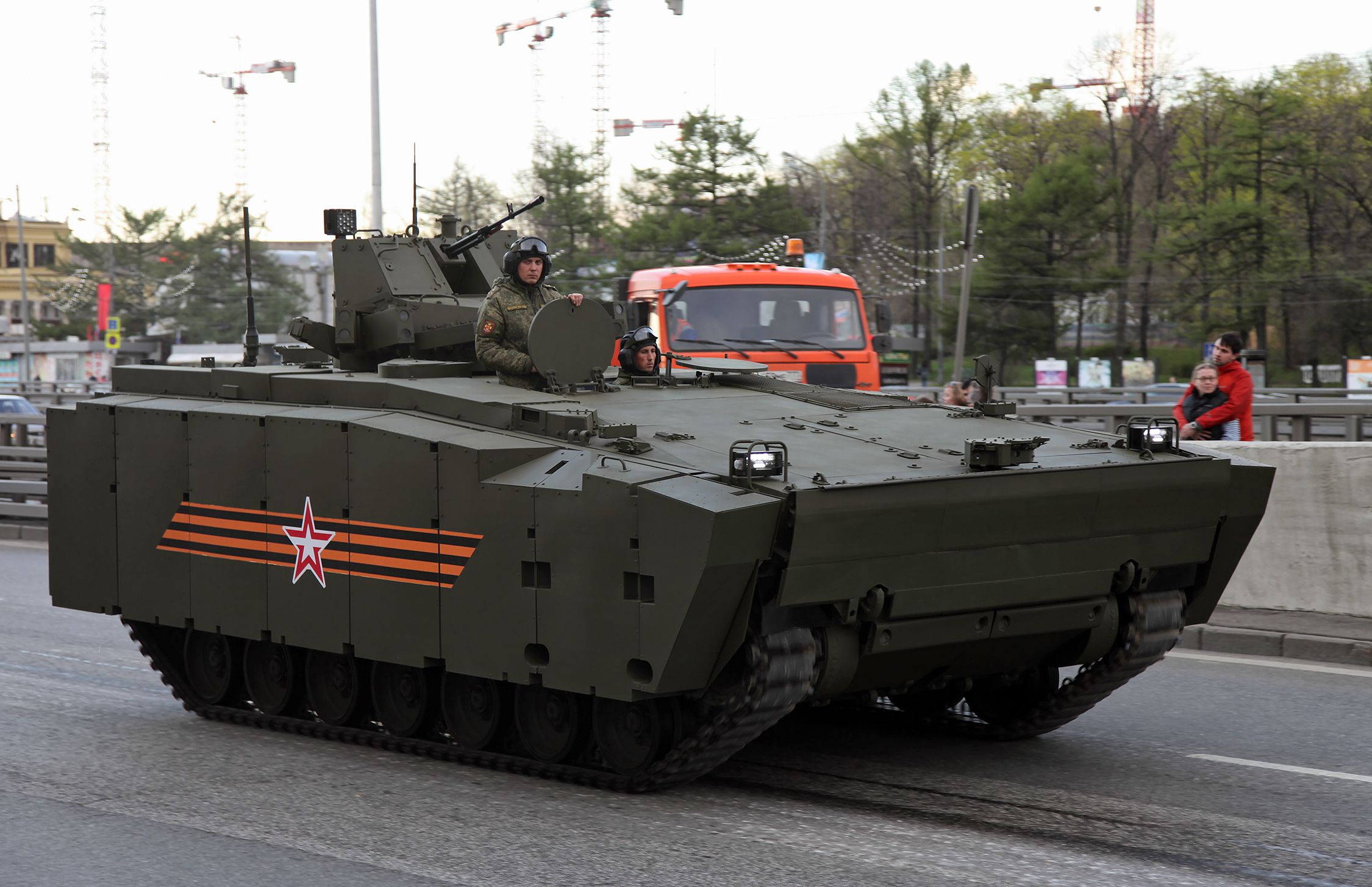
- Kurganets-25 IFV Kurganets-25 APC
- Type: Infantry fighting vehicle Armoured personnel carrier Armoured recovery vehicle
- Place of origin: Russian Federation

Service history
- Used by: Russian Armed Forces

Production history
- Designer: Kurgan Machine-Building, Kurganmashzavod
- Manufacturer: Kurganmashzavod
- Unit cost: around 300,000,000 rubles (4,000,000 dollars)
- Produced: unknown, at least 1 as a technology demonstrator

Specifications
- Mass: 25 tonnes (28 short tons)
- Crew: 3 (+8 passengers)
- Main armament: Kurganets-25 IFV: Bumerang-BM remote weapon station turret with 30 mm automatic cannon 2A42, 9M133 Kornet-EM anti-tank missiles, and PKT 7.62 mm coaxial machine gun or AU-220M Baikal remote weapon station with 57 mm BM-57 autocannon and 7.62 mm PKMT machine gun Kurganets-25 APC: 12.7 mm 6S21-01 DPV-T machine gun remote turret
- Engine: 800 hp
- Power/weight: 32 hp/tonne
- Suspension: Torsion bar
- Maximum speed: 80 km/h (50 mph); On water: 10 km/h (6.2 mph; 5.4 kn)

The Kurganets-25 (Russian: Курганец-25) is a tracked amphibious, 25-ton modular infantry fighting vehicle and armored personnel carrier being developed for the Russian Army. The Kurganets-25 is planned to evolve into various models, gradually replacing BMP, BMD, MT-LB and other types of tracked Soviet armored platforms. The Kurganets-25 is supposed to have modular armor that can be upgraded for specific threats. The Kurganets-25 IFV and APC variants were first seen in public (initially with the turret and main armament shrouded) during rehearsals for the 2015 Moscow Victory Day Parade. Serial production was supposed to begin in 2016, but as of 2020, certification by the military is still pending. In 2023, it was confirmed that Kurganets was undergoing trials, and that the vehicle was modified at the customer's request. The changes affected the Kurganets-25 chassis, which as a result became more reliable and also easier to operate and repair.

A few of the vehicles were seen in the 2025 Moscow Victory Day Parade.

== Design ==
The Kurganets-25 is designed to be a successor to the BMP-3 Russian tracked troop carrier which fulfills a similar role as Western designs like the American M2 Bradley and British Warrior. The Kurganets-25 is based on the Armata Universal Combat Platform while being lighter than the T-15 Armata "heavy IFV" based on the same and similar to the wheeled VPK-7829 Bumerang.

There are two versions of the vehicle: a heavily armed infantry fighting vehicle carrying 6-7 troops, and a lightly armed APC carrying 8 troops. Other variants proposed for the Kurganets include an armored ambulance, an 82 mm Vasilek mortar carrier, an anti-tank vehicle, an armored recovery vehicle, a reconnaissance vehicle, a command vehicle, and an armored engineering vehicle.

The vehicle represents a departure from traditional Russian low profile designs, having a higher floor more suited for mounted combat rather than troop carrying, which provides better IED and mine protection. While the T-15 is expected to be deployed with T-14 tanks in armored formations, Kurganets-25 platforms will equip mechanized units. Russian Ground Forces were to receive the first batch of Kurganets-25 IFVs for trials in 2019. No vehicle production or commission as of 2025.

=== Armament ===
The Kurganets-25 IFV features the Bumerang-BM remote control turret with its 2A42 30 mm autocannon, a 7.62 mm coaxial PKT machine gun and a bank of two Kornet-EM anti-tank guided missiles on either side. The Kurganets-25 APC variant has a 12.7 mm MG RWS instead of the Bumerang-BM turret.

An SPAAG version with a 57 mm autocannon and a Kurganets-25 SPG with a 125 mm are planned.

=== Mobility ===
The Kurganets-25 weighs 25 tonnes. This allows the Kurganets-25 to be light enough to be mobile on water. The maximum speed of the vehicle is 80 km/h on land and 10 km/h on water. Both the IFV and APC variants have a front-mounted 800 hp engine.

=== Protection ===
The Kurganets-25 IFV has 360-degree coverage from its active protection system launcher tubes. This APS is smaller than the one found on the T-14 Armata and T-15, but like the T-15, it is attached close to the top of the hull. A two-part projectile detection system is placed on various places on the hull and turret. The Kurganets-25 APC variant, when revealed in the 2015 Moscow Victory Day Parade, had a scaled down APS system which was mounted only on the turret with none on the hull.

=== Ergonomics and crew ===
According to the first vice president and co-owner of Concern Tractor Plants, Albert Bakov, the Kurganets-25 uses a console similar to a Sony PlayStation DualShock gamepad. It is wider than previous generations of Russian APCs and IFVs.

The front located engine increases crew comfort and ease of access.

== Variants ==
A few different versions of Kurganets-25 are in development.

- B-10 IFV (Industrial designation – Object 693);
- B-11 APC (Industrial designation – Object 695).
- B-12 ARV – Equipped with a crane, a winch and armed with a 12.7mm heavy machine gun.

== See also ==
- Bumerang-BM – (Russia)
- VPK-7829 Bumerang – (Russia)
- T-15 Armata – (Russia)
- Typhoon (AFV family) – (Russia)
- Borsuk IFV – (Poland)
