= Armata Universal Combat Platform =

Armata
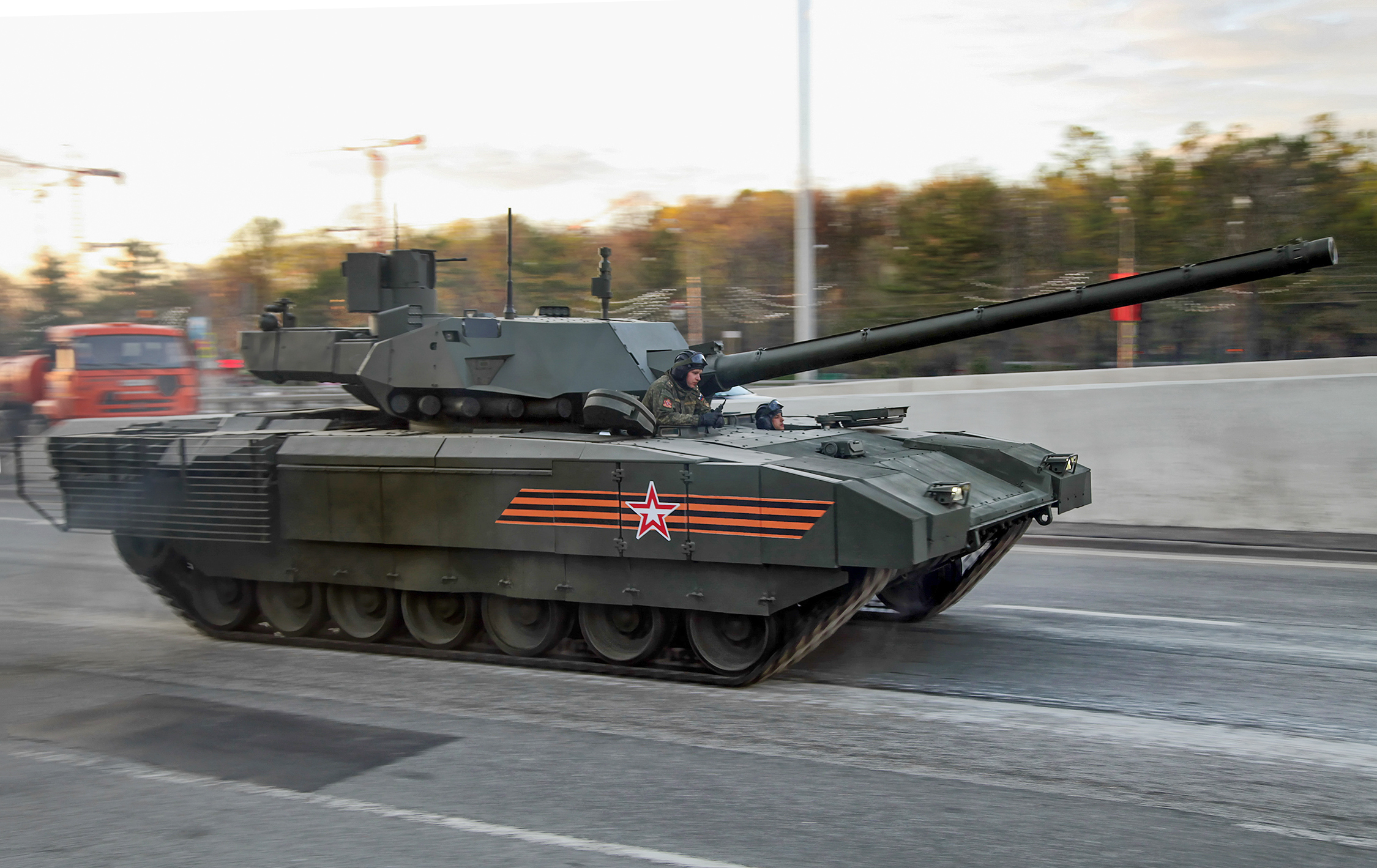
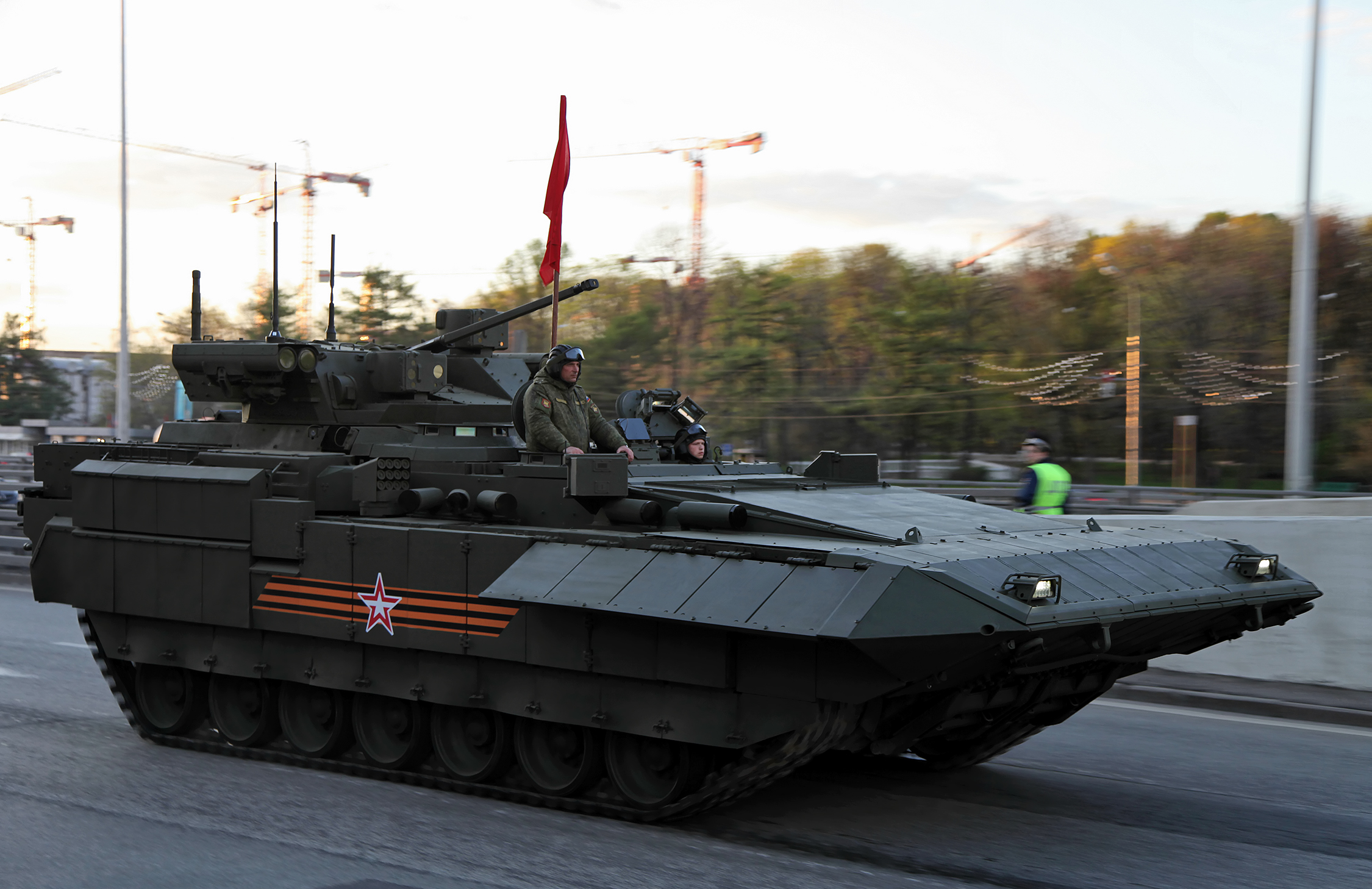
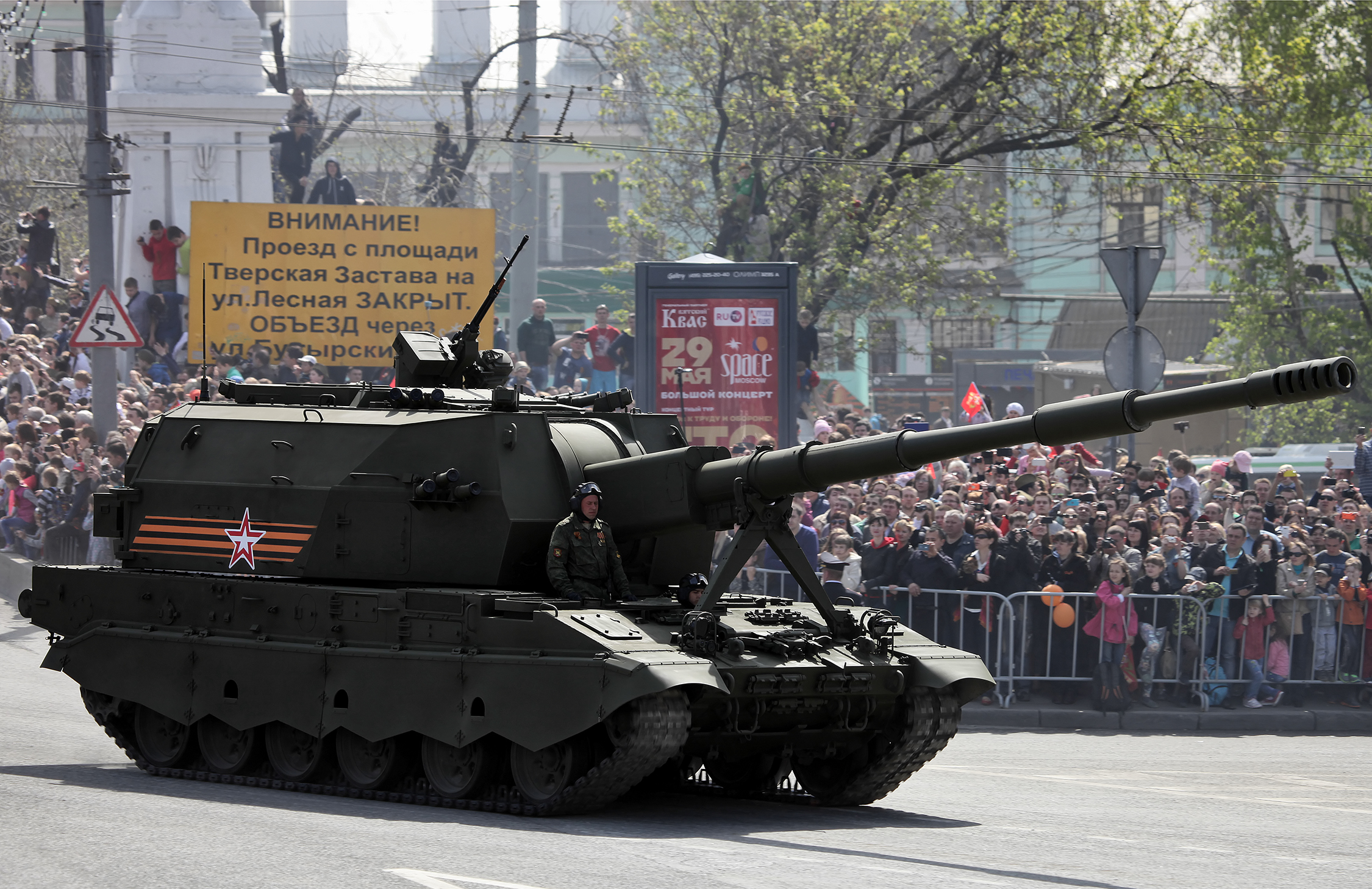
- T-14 Armata MBT T-15 Armata IFV with Epoch 30mm turret covered up 2S35 self-propelled artillery
- Type: Tracked heavy armored vehicle
- Place of origin: Russia

Service history
- Used by: Russian Armed Forces

Production history
- Designer: Ural Design Bureau of Transport Machine-Building, Uralvagonzavod
- Manufacturer: Uralvagonzavod
- Unit cost: $3,700,000 (T-14)
- Produced: 2015
- No. built: 20+

Specifications
- Mass: 48 tons in an MBT configuration
- Crew: 3
- Armor: Steel 44S-sv-Sh; (T14/15) Afganit active protection system soft & hard measures; Dual-reactive armour "Malachit"; (the stealth and list is not exhaustive)
- Main armament: T-14: 125mm 2A82-1M smoothbore cannon with autoloader; T-15: Bumerang-BM turret; 2S35: 152mm gun
- Secondary armament: T-14: 12.7 mm and 7.62 mm machine guns
- Engine: ChTZ 12N360 (A-85-3A) diesel engine 1,500 hp (1,100 kW), moderated to 1,200 hp (890 kW) in normal operation
- Transmission: 16-gear automatic transmission (estimate, including reverse gears)
- Maximum speed: 80 km/h (50 mph) (forwards, estimate); 80 km/h (50 mph) (reverse, estimate)

The "Armata" Universal Combat Platform (Russian: Армата) is a Russian advanced next generation modular heavy military tracked vehicle platform. The Armata platform is the basis of the T-14 (a main battle tank), the T-15 (a heavy infantry fighting vehicle), a combat engineering vehicle, an armoured recovery vehicle, a heavy armoured personnel carrier, a tank support combat vehicle, and several types of self-propelled artillery, including the 2S35 Koalitsiya-SV under the same codename based on the same chassis. It is also intended to serve as the basis for artillery, air defense, and NBC defense systems. The new "Armata" tank platform is meant to replace the older Russian main battle tanks and APCs that are currently used by the Russian military.

== Origin of designation ==
The combat platform is formally designated as "prospective family of heavy unified battlefield platforms". The name "Armata" derives from the plural of the Latin word arma which refers to weapons of war, and was an old Russian word for 14th century guns; it is also the plural of the ancient Greek word "Arma", meaning "chariot" or in modern Greek, "tank". This was wrongly transcribed as "Armada" by journalists on several occasions.

== Development ==
The Armata combat platform has been under design and development since 2009 by Uralvagonzavod headquartered in Nizhny Tagil. Prototypes of heavy armored vehicles based on the Armata combat platform were presented at the defense exhibition Russian Arms Expo in Nizhny Tagil in September 2013. In November 2014 trials of the 2S35 Koalitsiya-SV self-propelled gun variant were under way.

The first vehicles were shown to the public in the 2015 Moscow Victory Day Parade, with a batch of 32 to be delivered to the Russian Land Forces during the same year. Russian media has previously stated that mass delivery will start in 2015 or 2016.

A total of 2,300 MBTs were expected to be supplied by 2020, modernizing 70 percent of the Russian tank fleet. The Uralvagonzavod plant was expected to roll out around 500 T-14 Armata tanks per year. In 2017, the order was scaled back to a test batch of 100 tanks by 2020, with the program extended to 2025.

At a 2015 Moscow Victory Day Parade practice drill run on the Alabino training grounds several types of armored vehicles described as various Armata models appeared with their turrets covered. Russian Defence Ministry signed a long-term contract for delivery of tanks and heavy IFVs on the Armata basis.

Serial production of the Armata Platform's ceramic armor components began in mid-2015.

In December 2019, Russian Deputy Minister of Defense Alexei Krivoruchko reported delays with the development and production, with the first batch of five vehicles available for state-conducted testing expected "in the next month or two".

== Design ==
Russian Lieutenant-General Yuri Kovalenko states that the "Armata" combat platform will utilize many features of the T-95 tank, of which only a few prototypes have been built. In the main battle tank variant, the ammunition compartment will be separate from the crew, increasing operational safety while the engine will be more powerful and the armor, main gun and autoloader will be improved.

According to preliminary reports, the new tank designated T-14 Armata will be less radical and ambitious than the canceled ‘Object 195’ or T-95. It will weigh less, therefore being more agile and more affordable when compared to its more ambitious predecessors. Additionally, the T-15 Armata, Kurganets-25 IFV and Bumerang IFV will be able to equip the same 30mm Bumerang-BM.

The vehicles of the Armata platform will be equipped with the radar and other technologies found on the Sukhoi Su-57 fifth-generation jet fighter. They include a Ka band radar (26.5–40 GHz) based on AESA radar. The devices should be ready by 2015.

The Armata will use a new type of lightweight armor designated 44S-SV-SH, developed by the Scientific Research Institute of Steel. This armor does not lose its qualities when used in extremely low temperatures, which may indicate an interest in using the tank in Arctic conditions.

The Armata tank will have a remote weapon station turret and an automated control system, with the crew protected by an armored capsule. It will have an externally mounted 125 mm gun with 32 rounds of ammunition; in addition to tank rounds, a new laser-guided missile able to be fired from the main gun with a tandem Kornet-D (or better) anti-tank or anti low flying helicopters warhead with a range of 7,000–12,000 m (23,000–39,000 ft). The secondary armament will consist of a 12.7mm 6P49 machine gun and a 7.62mm PKT machine gun.

== Variants ==
- T-14: Main battle tank. Industrial designation "Object 148".
- T-15: Heavy IFV. Industrial designation "Object 149".
- BREM-T T-16: Armoured recovery vehicle. Industrial designation "Object 152".
- BMOP "Terminator-3": Armoured fighting vehicle.
- 2S35 Koalitsiya-SV: Self-propelled gun However, the 2S35's on display during the 2015 Moscow Victory Day Parade and its rehearsals are not actually built on the Armata platform but rather a six-wheeled platform that appears to be a T-90 derived chassis.

Projects

- USM-A1: Combat engineering vehicle.
- BMO-2: Heavy armored personnel carrier for flamethrower-squads.
- BM-2: Large box-type multi-barrel rocket launcher for the TOS-2 Heavy Flamethrower System, similar to TOS-1 Buratino.
- TZM-2: Reloading vehicle for the TOS-2 Heavy Flamethrower System.
- MIM-A: Combat engineering vehicle.
- MT-A: Armoured bridge layer.
- UMZ-A: Combat engineering vehicle.
- PTS-A: Tracked amphibious vehicle.
- A mortar carrier which uses the 2S12A Sani or the 2B11 Sani.

== Operators ==
- Russia: 16 to 20 T-14 tank prototypes were built and used for evaluation and testing before 2018. The first 12 production tanks and 4 armoured recovery vehicles were to be delivered by the end of 2019 and then enter operational evaluation. In 2021, the Russian Ministry of Defense announced the first pilot batch of T-14, T-15 and T-16 vehicles would instead be delivered in 2022.

== See also ==
- T-90
- Typhoon (AFV family)
- Future Combat Systems Manned Ground Vehicles, American AFV program canceled in 2009
