= VPK-7829 Bumerang =

Russian amphibious armoured personnel carrier

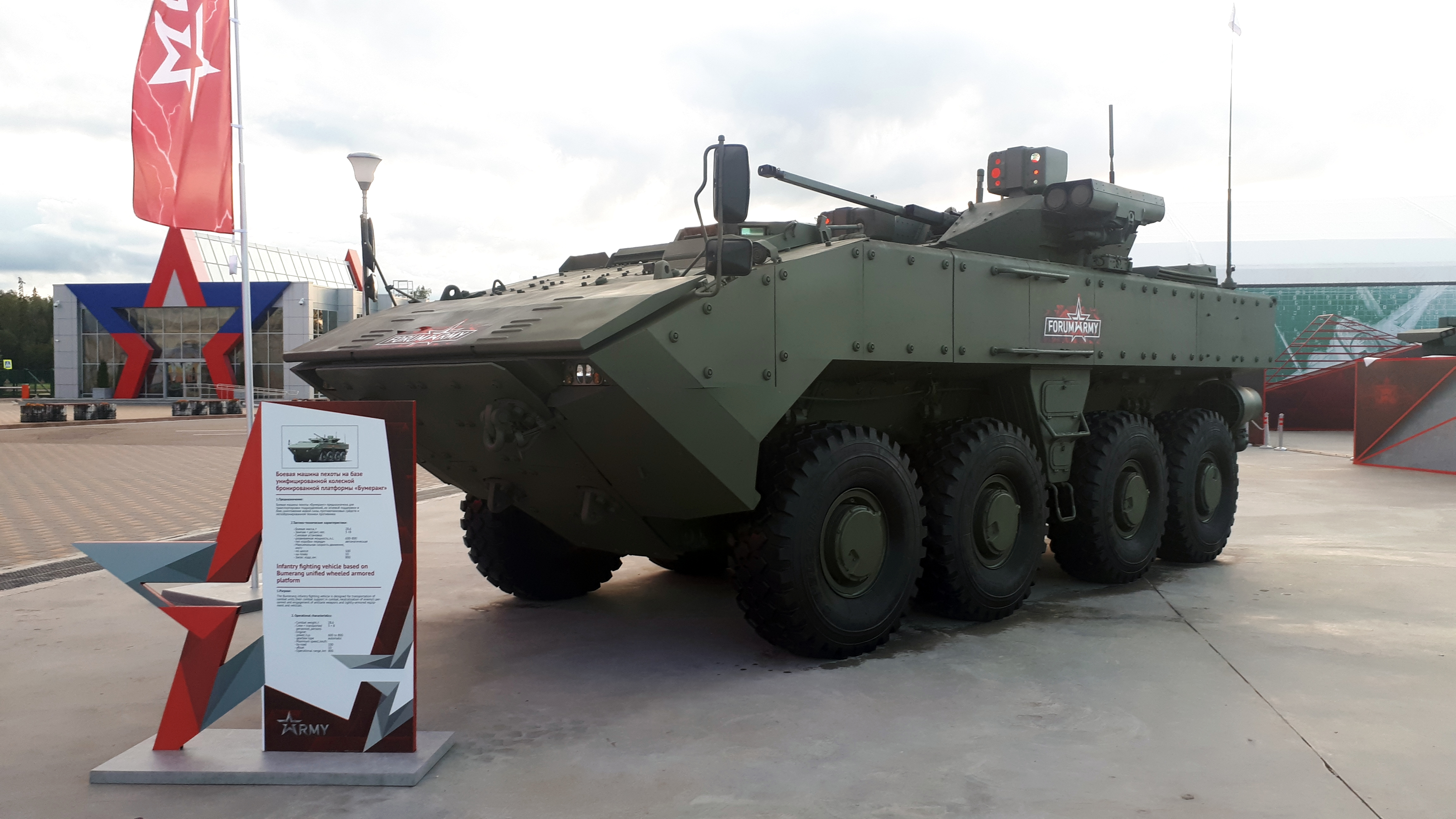
- Bumerang IFV
- Type: Infantry fighting vehicle Armoured personnel carrier Tank destroyer
- Place of origin: Russia

Production history
- Designer: Military Industrial Company LLC (VPK)
- Manufacturer: Arzamas Machine-Building Plant
- Produced: n/a
- No. built: ~5

Specifications
- Mass: 34 tons
- Length: 8.805 m
- Width: 3.187 m
- Height: 3.185 m (At the top of the sight)
- Crew: 3 (+7–8 passengers)
- Armor: Some form of ceramic
- Main armament: Bumerang IFV: Bumerang-BM remote weapon station turret with 30 mm automatic cannon 2A42, 9M133 Kornet-EM anti-tank missiles, and PKT 7.62 mm coaxial machine gun or AU-220M Baikal remote weapon station with 57 mm BM-57 autocannon and 7.62mm PKMT machine gun< Bumerang APC: 12.7 mm 6S21-01 DPV-T machine gun remote turret
- Engine: BarnaulTransMash turbocharged diesel UTD-32TR; 510 hp
- Suspension: wheeled 8×8
- Operational range: 800 km (500 mi)
- Maximum speed: 100 km/h (62 mph)

The VPK-7829 Bumerang (Russian: Бумеранг, Boomerang) is a prototype modular amphibious wheeled infantry fighting vehicle and armored personnel carrier developed by Russian Military Industrial Company for the Russian army. In over 10 years since being unveiled, the vehicle has not entered serial production and total vehicles delivered are widely reported to be in the single digits.

== History ==
In the early 1990s, the BTR-90 was developed as a replacement for the BTR-80 in the Russian Army. While it was a moderate improvement in armament, protection, mobility, and internal space over its predecessor, it all came at the cost of greatly increased unit price. It wasn't accepted into service (except in small numbers) as the modest increase in performance wasn't seen as enough justification for its cost and complexity. Purchases of the BTR-80 stopped in 2010 and the improved BTR-82 was obtained as a stop-gap measure. In mid-2011, the Russian Ministry of Defense issued a requirement for a new modular wheeled family of armored vehicles instead of buying the BTR-90. Development of a new wheeled APC is being done alongside the new and similarly armed and armored but tracked Kurganets-25 infantry fighting vehicle and heavy T-15 Armata IFV.

In November 2011, media reports said the new project had been approved. On 21 February 2012, Colonel General Alexander Postnikov said that the Russian Army would be taking the first deliveries of the Bumerang prototype in 2013. Large-scale deliveries are to begin in 2015. At least 2,000 Bumerang vehicles are to replace the BTR-80 and BTR-82/A in Russian service.

The Bumerang was first seen in public (initially with its turret and cannon shrouded) during rehearsals for the 2015 Moscow Victory Day Parade.

However, the vehicle faced several delays in both preliminary and state trials. In 2015 it was reported that the Bumerang had first entered preliminary trials and would enter service by the year's end. By 2018 it was reported to still be undergoing trials that would be completed within the year.

In 2020 it was stated that state trials of the platform will be finished in 2021, with production starting afterwards. The reason for the delay was that after preliminary trials in 2019, it was decided to make changes to the main body, as a result of which the conditions for soldiers in the troop compartment would be improved, as well as the vehicle's buoyancy.

In April 2023, it was reported that state tests of Bumerang vehicles had begun at military training grounds, with seven vehicles in total participating in the testing. It was stated that these tests are scheduled to finish by the end of 2023, after which mass production could begin.

== Design ==
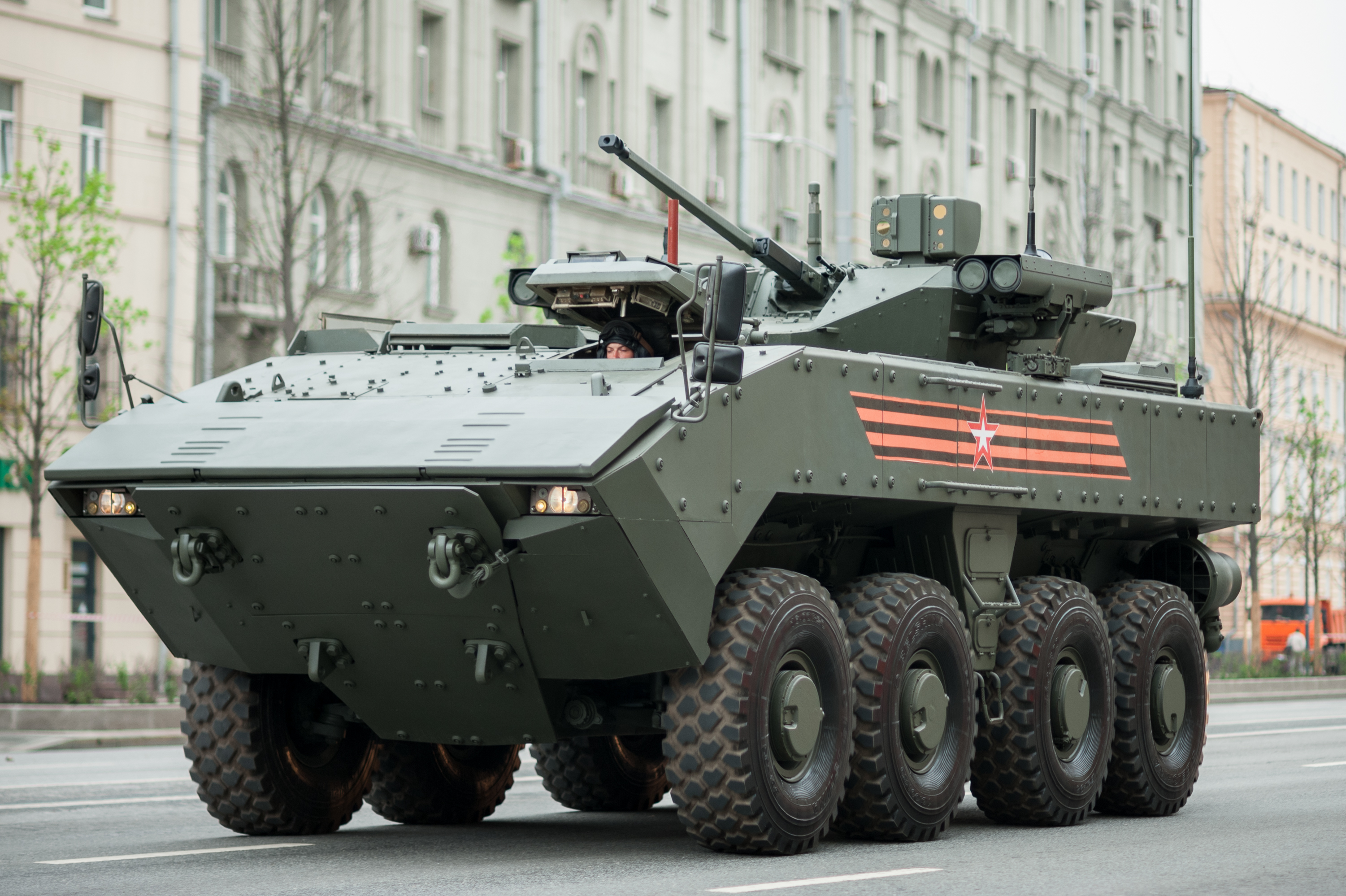
Bumerang IFV

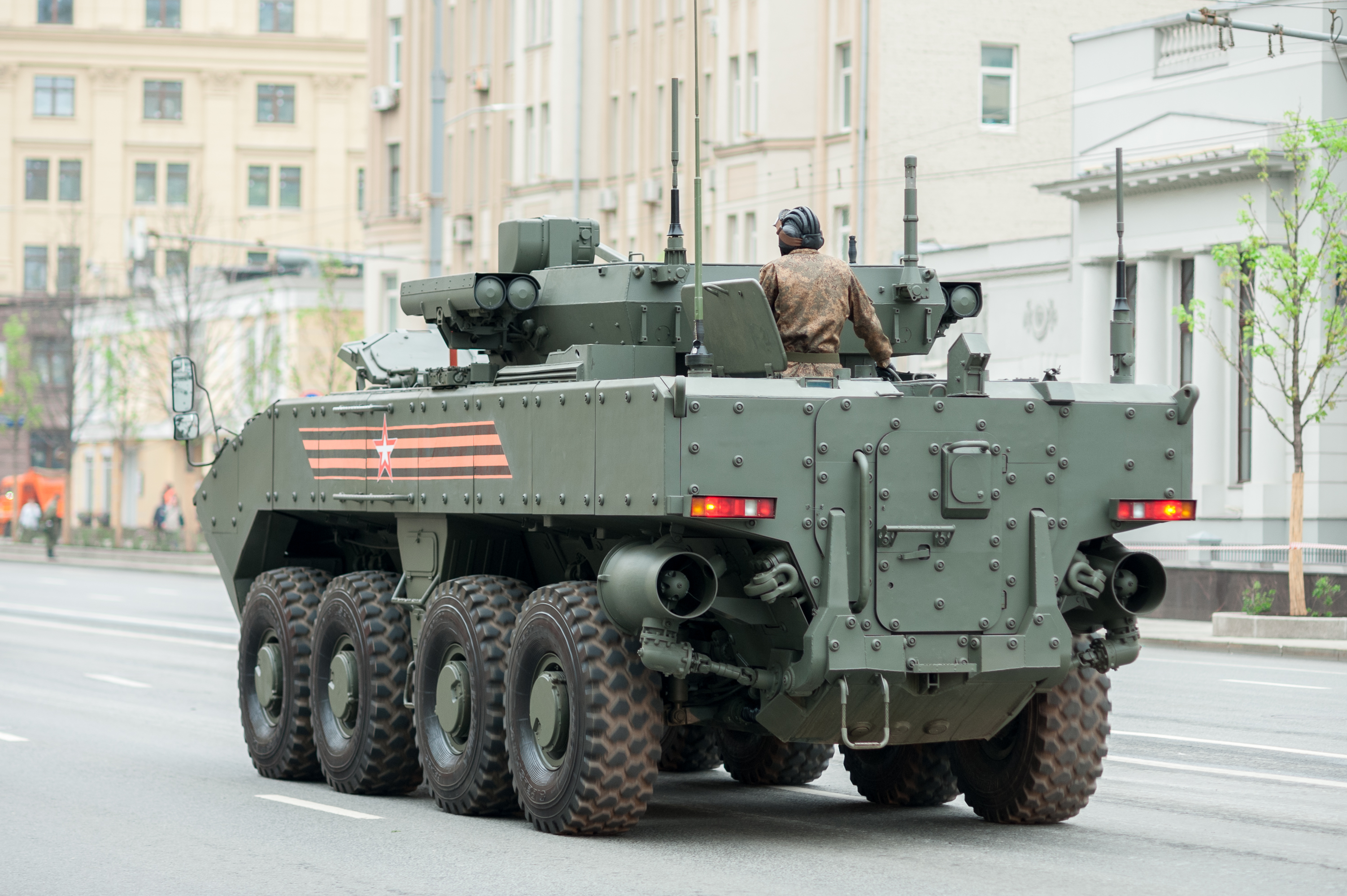
Rear view of the Bumerang with the two waterjets visible

MIC claims it "will be nothing like any of the modern APCs". The Bumerang vehicle will be based on Armata Universal Combat Platform. It will be amphibious and be able to negotiate and overcome water obstacles using two waterjets. In a departure with the previous BTR (Like BTR-70) series of vehicles, the engine will be located in the front instead of the rear. Engine location was a significant drawback of BTR vehicles, where soldiers had to exit the vehicles through cramped side doors. The Bumerang has rear doors and roof hatches for troop entry and exit. It will likely have a crew of three consisting of the driver, gunner, and commander and hold seven troops. Protection will come from ceramic armor and technologies to prevent shell splinters. Like BTRs, the Bumerang will be an 8×8 wheeled vehicle, and will be equipped with a 750 hp turbocharged diesel engine.

== Armament ==
Several components and subsystems will be interchangeable between the Bumerang APC and Kurganets-25 IFV, and both vehicles will be powered by the same engine. There are two versions of the Bumerang 8×8 vehicle: the K-16 armored personnel carrier (APC), lightly armed with a 12.7 mm machine gun in a small remote turret; and the K-17 infantry fighting vehicle (IFV), heavily armed with the Bumerang-BM RWS with a 30 mm cannon and Kornet-EM anti-tank missiles or AU-220M with 57 mm BM-57 autocannon and 7.62mm PKMT machine gun.

Front armor protection vs 30 mm – all-round armor protection 14.5 mm

== Variants ==
The VPK-7829 Bumerang is referred to as "a combat wheeled vehicle" because it will serve several different roles, similar to America's Strykers. Other vehicle platform variations will fulfill different roles in addition to armored transport, including as an armored ambulance, command post vehicle, reconnaissance vehicle, anti-tank missile carrier, air defense missile launcher, fire support vehicle, and mortar carrier. Further versions could include a light tank (plans to create a version with 57 mm autocannon as well as version with a 125 mm gun for use as a self-propelled anti-tank gun were confirmed in March 2018) and a self-propelled gun.

- BTR-7829 K-16 Bumerang – APC version with a remote weapon station with a 12.7mm heavy machine gun.
- VPK-7829 K-17 Bumerang – IFV version with 30 mm or 57 mm autocannon.
- Self-propelled anti-tank gun version – Similar to the Centauro, one of which had been previously leased to Russia.

== See also ==
- Bumerang-BM – (Russia) – Epoch remote control turret
- Kurganets-25 – (Russia)
- T-15 Armata – (Russia)
- T-14 Armata – (Russia)
- Typhoon – (Russia)
