= Volat V-2 =

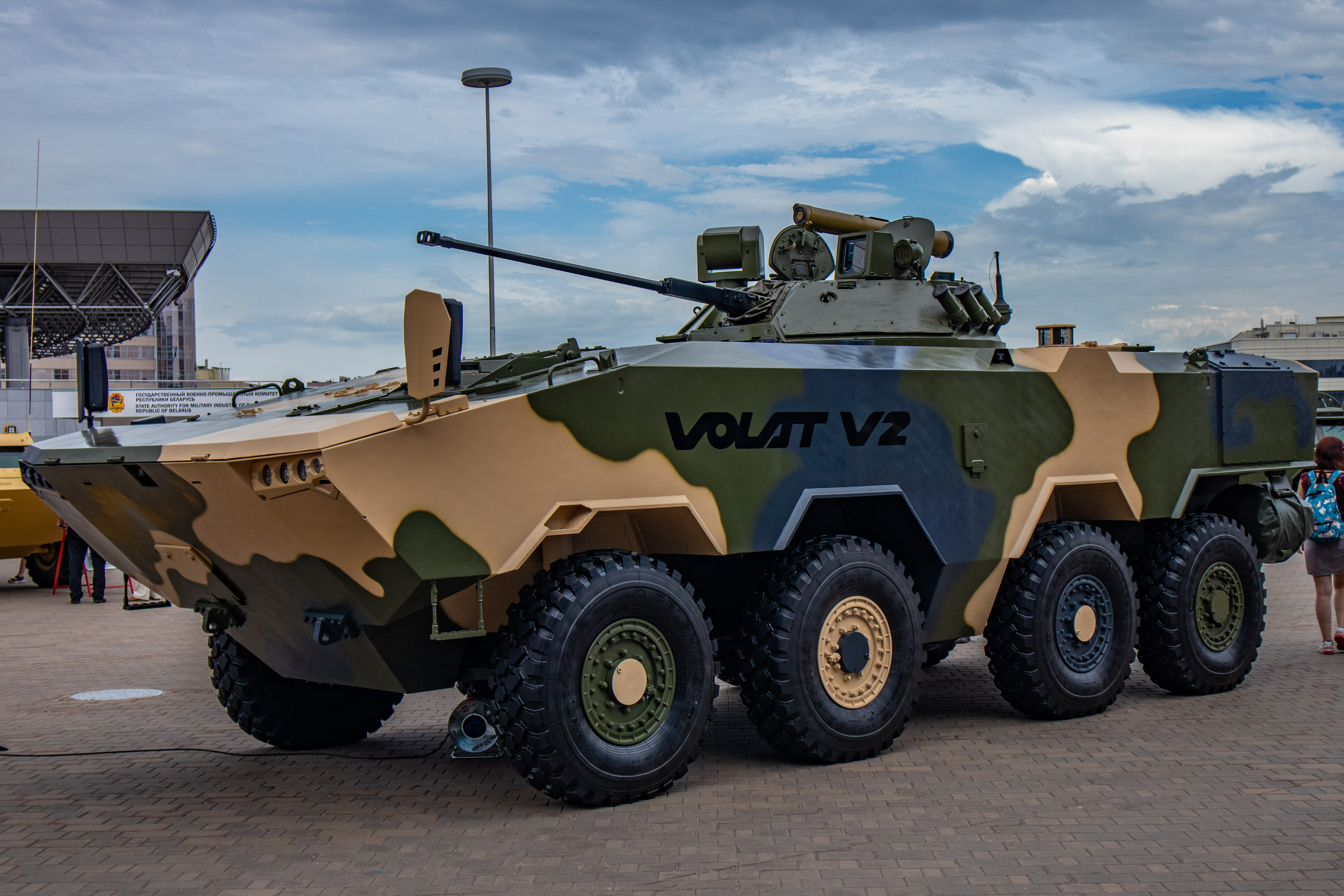
- Volat V-2 at Milex-2021
- Type: Armoured personnel carrier
- Place of origin: Belarus

Service history
- In service: 2025-present

Production history
- Designer: MZKT
- Designed: Before 2021
- Manufacturer: MZKT
- Produced: 2025-present

Specifications
- Mass: 23.5 t
- Crew: 3 (+ 8 passengers)
- Armor: Front: Br-5 Sides: Br-4
- Main armament: 30-mm 2A42 cannon
- Secondary armament: 7,62 mm PKT, 9M113 ATGM
- Engine: WP13.560 Diesel engine 560 hp
- Operational range: 900-1200 km
- Maximum speed: 110 km/h

MZKT-690003 Volat V-2 (Belarusian:Волат; "The Giant") is a Belarusian 8×8-wheeled Armoured personnel carrier developed by MZKT.

== History ==
Belarusian designers, in parallel with the process of upgrading and modernizing of BTR-70s, had an idea of creating an indigenous BTR in collaboration with Russia. This was the initiative of MZKT in a period of 2008-2010. The vehicle received index MZKT-590100 "Umka". However work has then stalled, as no government contract was signed, and suggestions towards State Military-Industrial Committee for development of government program failed. Umka project did not receive the support and funds of either the Ministry of Defense or the State Military-Industrial Committee. The lack of funding forced the MZKT to curtail work, and the initiative group of developers also disbanded.

In June 2021, it became known that the Minsk Wheeled Tractor Plant had developed the first domestic armored personnel carrier with an 8x8 wheel formula. In a statement issued by the press service of the State Military-Industrial Committee on the 8th of June, it says: "The created armored vehicles are capable of solving a wide range of combat tasks – to carry out the rapid transfer of personnel to combat sites and special operations, to provide fire support for personnel in combat, their protection from small arms, damaging factors of explosive devices and weapons of mass destruction, to destroy openly located and sheltered enemy manpower, its anti-tank weapons, lightly armored vehicles and tanks, as well as low-speed enemy air targets."

The vehicle was first shown to the public on June 23 at the MILEX-2021 exhibition. In the future, the APC should replace Soviet-made combat vehicles in service with the Belarusian army (BMP-1, BMP-2, BTR-70, BTR-80).

In July 2025, it was reported that MZKT was moving forward with serial production of the vehicle following its official adoption into service on the 7th May of the same year.

In November 2025 it was reported that first serial batch of Volat V2 has entered service with 120th Mechanized brigade. The vehicle presented had Adunok-BM30.2 combat module installed, suggesting that this version was accepted into service.

== Description ==
The vehicle is equipped with water-jet propulsion that ensures the ability to land from amphibious ships, cross rivers and other water barriers. The APC is capable of reaching speeds of up to 110 km/h on an asphalt surface and a maximum afloat speed of up to 10 km/h. It is equipped with a WP13.550 diesel six-cylinder engine with a capacity of 550 hp. The engine is paired with a hydromechanical six-speed gearbox manufactured by MZKT. To ensure high cross-country capability, a two-speed transfer case with a main lockable differential is installed on the APC, as well as drive axles with inter-wheel and inter-axle differentials with forced locking. Suspension is independent, single—lever, and hydropneumatic. Wheels with tubeless tires and radial deformation limiters (Run-Flat) are installed, ensuring movement on flat tires (if damaged) on hard roads at speeds up to 20 km/h. Additionally, a central automatic tire pressure control system is provided, controlled from the driver's seat. The APC is designed for operation in temperatures from -40 °C to +40 °C. This is ensured by the installation of an enhanced engine cooling system, a hydromechanical transmission and a separate transfer case cooling system. To power the engine with air afloat, the armored personnel carrier is equipped with a telescopic air intake.

The APC body consists of an engine and moto-transmission compartment, system compartments, and a habitat compartment. The habitat compartment consists of three compartments: control, combat and troop. In the control compartment there are controls, an instrument panel, a driver's seat, adjustable in height and longitudinal position, with a reclining backrest, with five-point seat belts; a driver's hatch with standard removable periscope monitoring devices. The combat compartment provides for the installation of a standard BMP-2 combat module (a 30-mm 2A42 automatic cannon with dual-tape power, a 7.62-mm PKT coaxial machine gun, and an ATGM). There is also a variation with the ADUNOK-BM30 module. In addition, there is the Br4 ballistic protection and the STANAG 4569 level 2a/2b mine protection. The troop compartment is located in the rear of the vehicle, accommodates eight people. A folding ramp in the rear of the APC allows landing both in the parking lot and in motion.

== Gallery ==
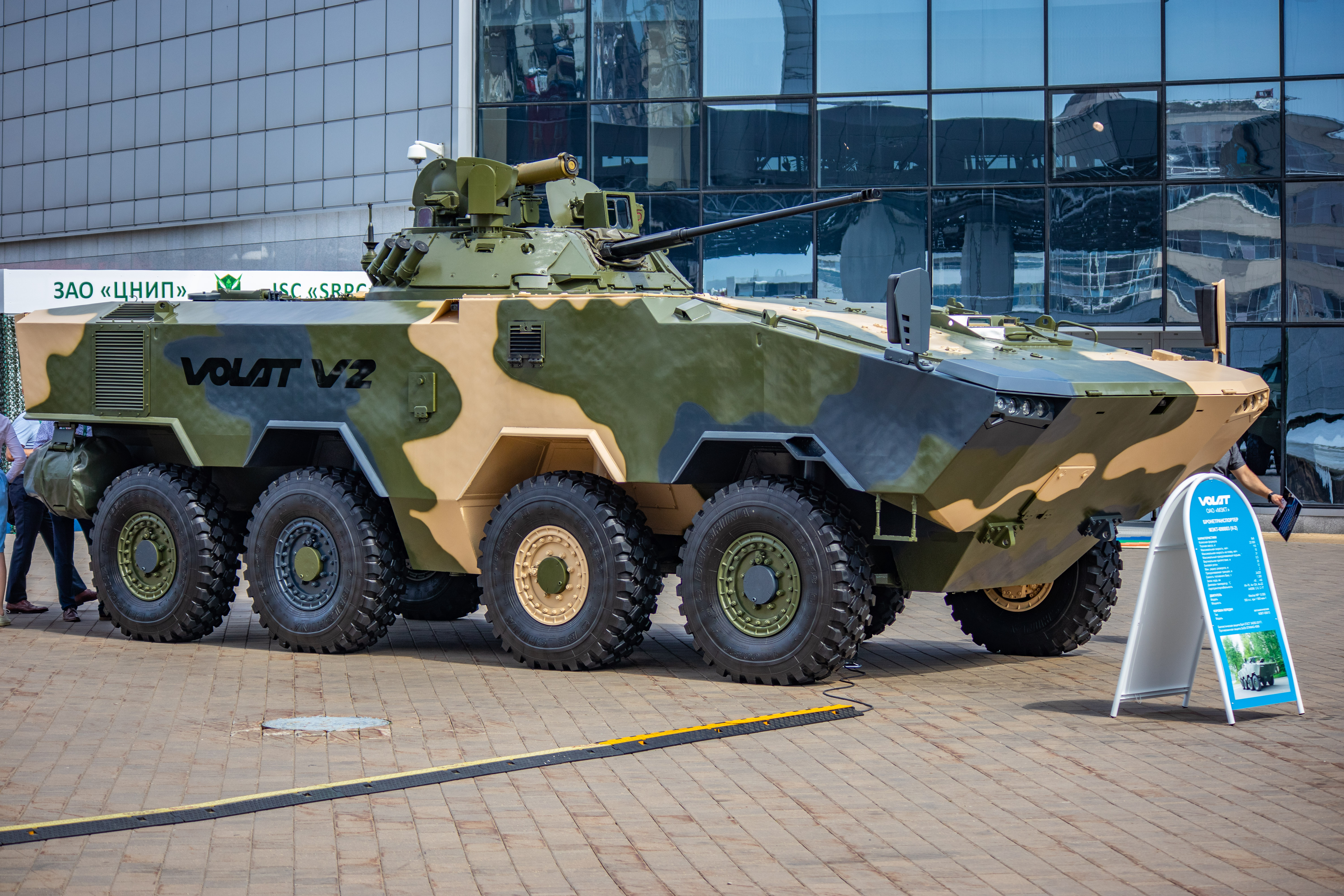
Volat V-2

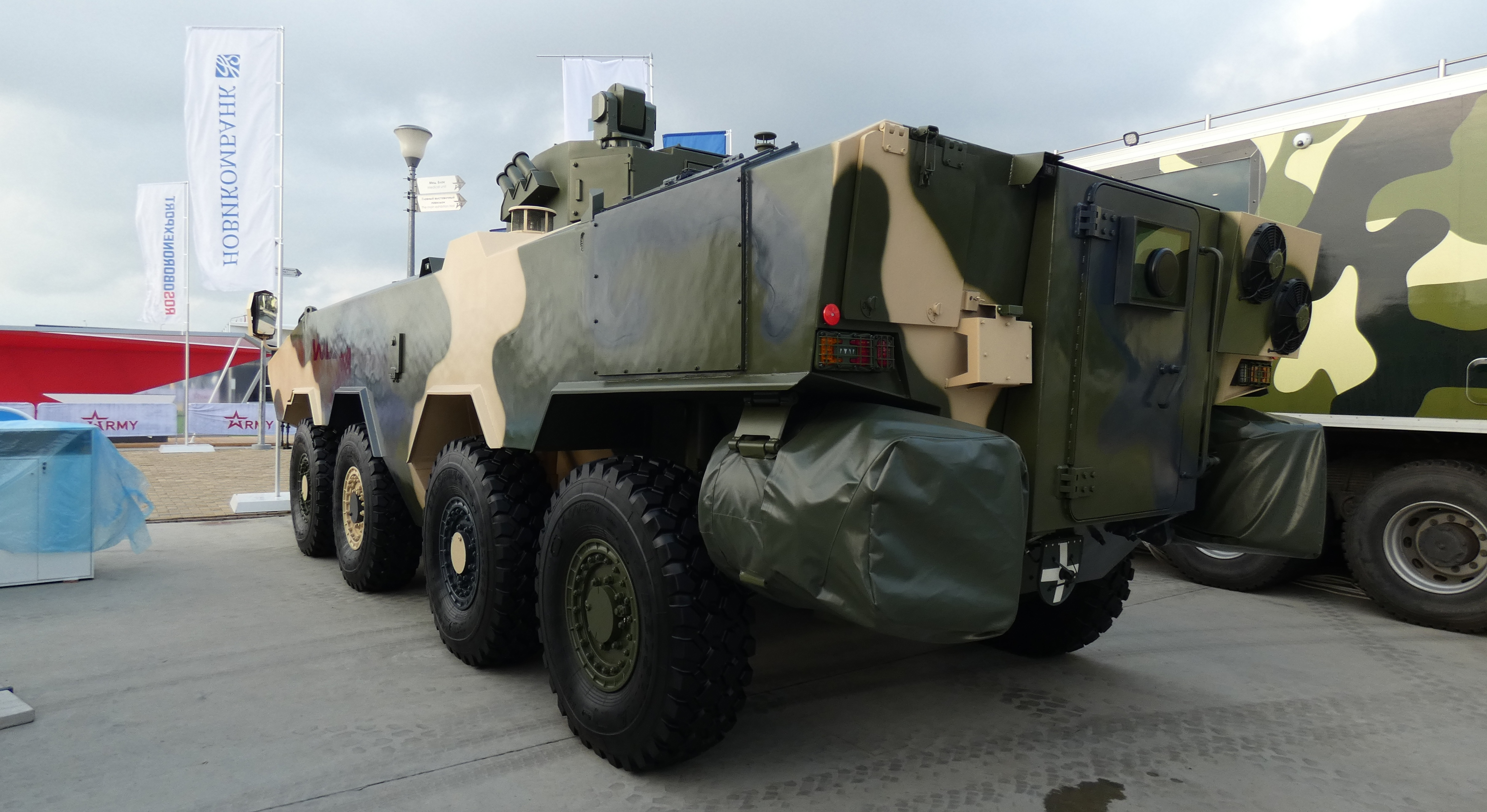
Pump jets are covered

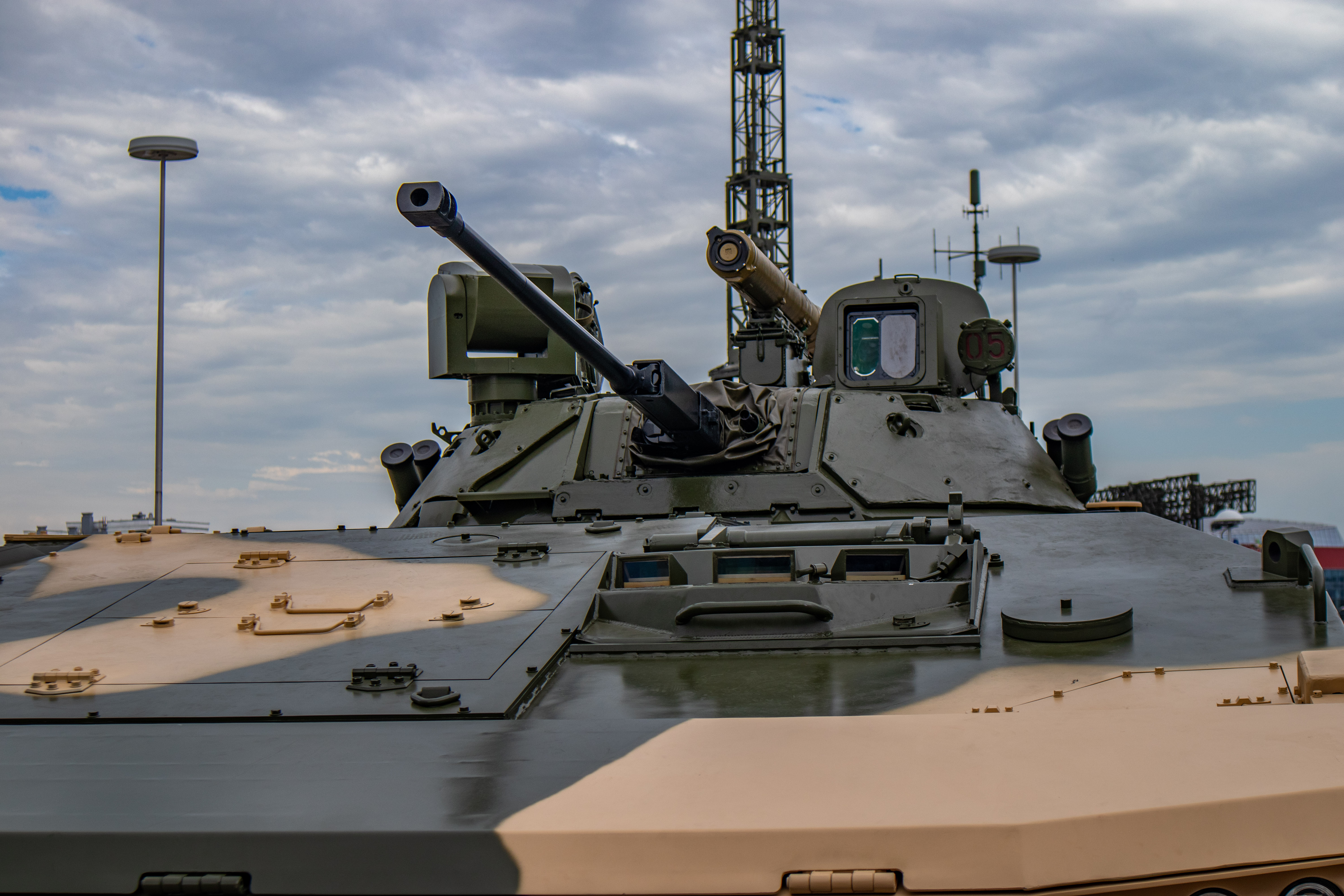
Modified BMP-2 turret
