= Kornet-D =

Kornet-D/EM
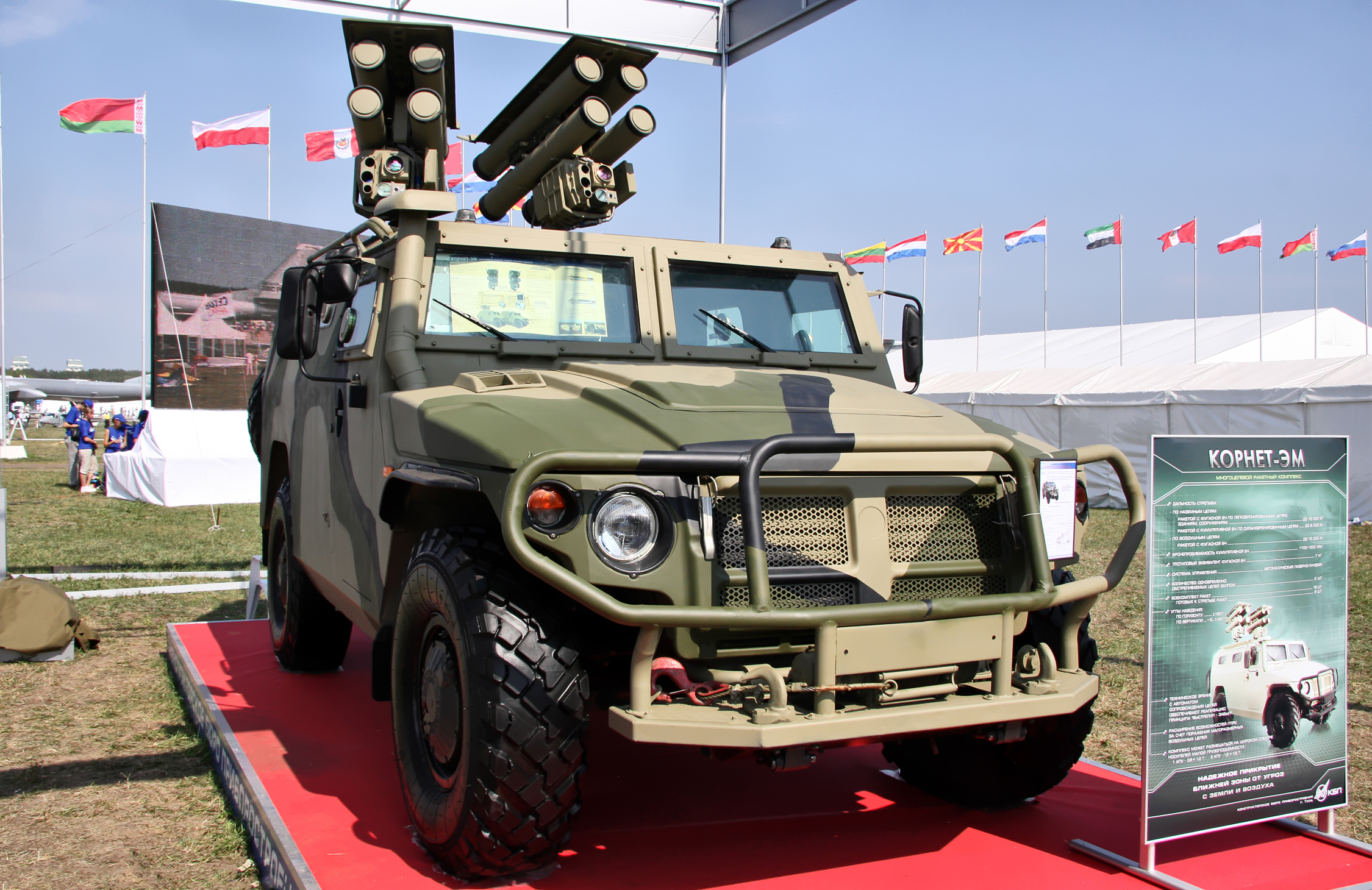
- Kornet-EM
- Type: Anti-tank missile carrier
- Place of origin: Russia

Service history
- In service: 2015
- Used by: see Current operators

Specifications
- Length: 4.61 meters
- Crew: 2
- Main armament: 8 × 9M133 Kornet-EM anti-tank guided missiles
- Engine: GAZ-562 or Cummins В180 or Cummins В215; 197–215 hp
- Suspension: 4×4
- Operational range: 1,000 km (620 mi)
- Maximum speed: 140 km/h (87 mph) on road 80 km/h (50 mph) off-road

Kornet-D is a Russian anti-tank missile carrier based on the AMS 233 144 TIGR-M 4x4 high mobility vehicle. It employs 9M133M Kornet-EM missiles in both tandem-HEAT or thermobaric warhead variants.

It is capable of launching a salvo of two missiles less than a second apart, either at a single target or at two different targets simultaneously. The two-missile salvo is intended to either defeat active protection systems or to ensure a single tank's destruction in the absence of an active protection system.

The system can be controlled remotely at a distance of 50 meters.

== Current operators ==
- Algeria
- Russia

== See also ==
- Pirooz - Iranian derivative of the Kornet-D system.

== See also ==
Media related to Kornet-EM at Wikimedia Commons

- List of Russian weaponry
