= Shipunov 2A42 =

Soviet autocannon

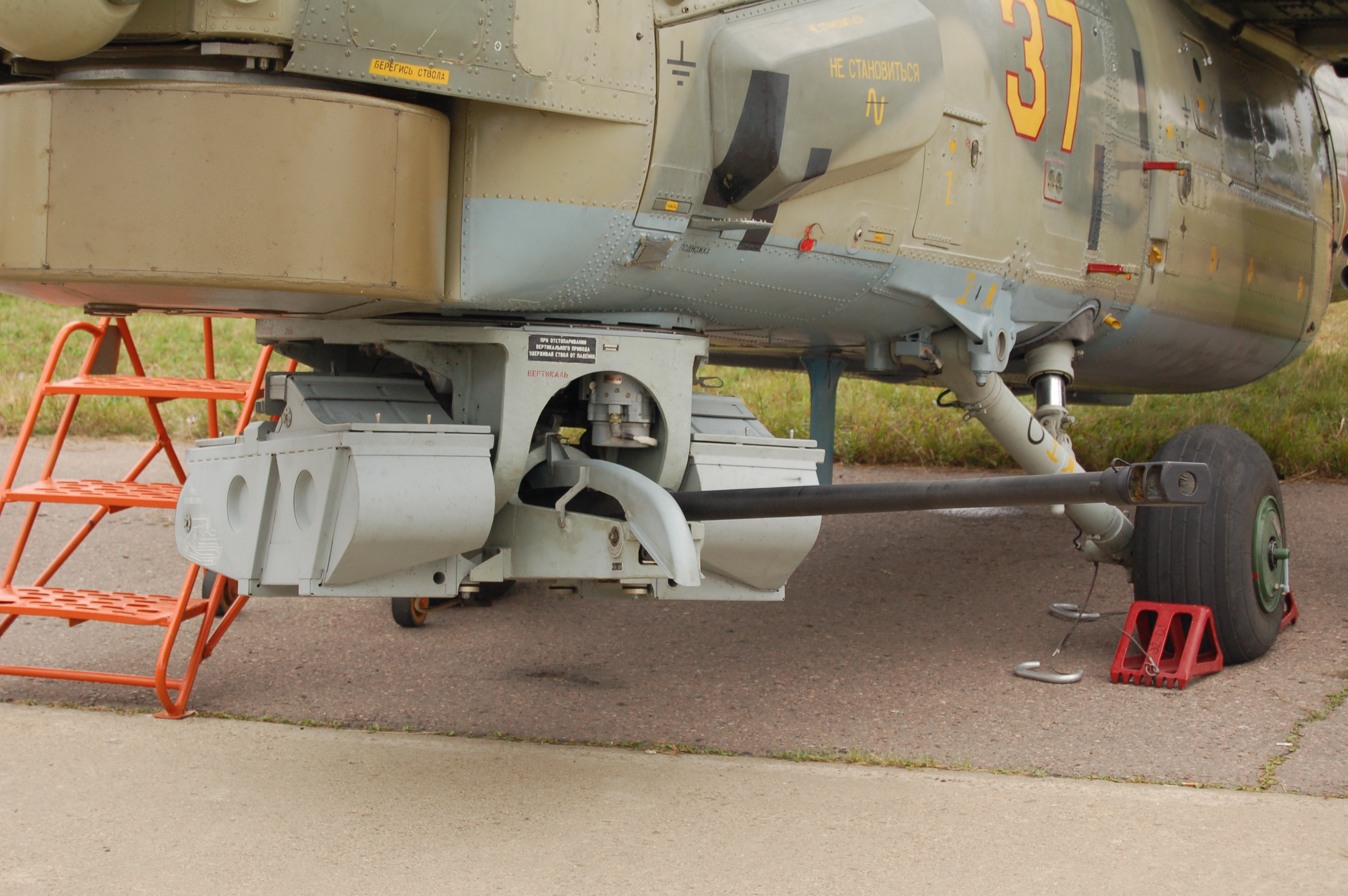
- 2А42 on the Mil Mi-28N helicopter
- Type: Autocannon
- Place of origin: Soviet Union

Service history
- In service: 1980–present

Production history
- Designer: KBP
- Designed: 1970s
- Manufacturer: Tulamashzavod
- Produced: 1980
- Variants: 2А72

Specifications
- Mass: 115 kilograms (254 lb)
- Length: 3.027 m (9 ft 11.2 in)
- Barrel length: 2,416 millimetres (95.1 in)
- Cartridge: 30x165 mm
- Caliber: 30 mm
- Barrels: 1
- Action: Gas-operated
- Rate of fire: 200–300 rds/min (low); 550–800 rds/min (high)
- Muzzle velocity: 960 metres per second (3,100 ft/s)
- Effective firing range: 2,000 metres (2,200 yd) (AP-T)
- Maximum firing range: 4,000 metres (4,400 yd) (HEI)
- Feed system: Twin feed

The Shipunov 2A42 is a Soviet 30 mm autocannon. It is built by the Tulamashzavod Joint Stock Company and named after A. G. Shipunov.

== Design ==
The 30 mm 2A42 autocannon was developed as a replacement for 2A28 Grom and has a dual feed. One is for HE-T and the other for AP-T rounds. The gunner can select from two rates of fire, low at 200 to 300 rds/min and high at 550 to 800 rds/min. According to the manufacturer, the cannon's effective range when engaging ground targets such as light armoured vehicles is 1,500 m (4,900 ft) while soft-skinned targets can be engaged out to 4,000 m (13,000 ft). Air targets can be engaged flying at low altitudes of up to 2,000 m (6,600 ft) at subsonic speeds, and up to a slant range of 2,500 m (8,200 ft). In addition to being installed in a two-person turret on the BMP-2 mechanised infantry combat vehicle, this gun is also fitted in the BMD-2 airborne combat vehicle, BMD-3 airborne combat vehicle and BTR-90 (or GAZ-5923) (8 × 8) armoured personnel carrier. A small number of these have now entered service. More recently, the 30 mm 2A42 cannon has been installed in a new turret and fitted onto the roof of the BTR-T heavy armoured personnel carrier based on a modified T-54/T-55 MBT chassis. The cannon is also the main armament of BMPT (Tank Support Fighting Vehicle). It is also used for various armament projects from various manufacturers. The design bureau for the 30 mm 2A42 cannon is the KBP Instrument Design Bureau.

The 2A42 autocannon has also been used on the BMPT and Bumerang-BM, and on unmanned remote controlled weapon station turrets on the new Russian infantry fighting vehicles including the Kurganets-25, VPK-7829 Bumerang, and T-15 Armata.

== Variants ==
- 2A42 – standard version.
  - ZTM-2 – Ukrainian production
  - GTS-30, GTS-30/A – Slovak production with a different muzzle brake
  - GTS-30/N – Slovak version adapted to 30x173mm NATO
- 2A72 – lighter simplified variant with a lower number of parts, a longer barrel, and higher muzzle velocity, but also a lower rate of fire. It is long recoil-operated, not gas-operated.
  - ABM-M30M3 – remote Weapon Station made by Impulse-2, for Uran-9 or different armored vehicles.
  - ABM-M30M3 Vikhr – another remote weapon station made by Impulse-2.
  - TRT-30 – remote weapon station.
  - ZPT-99 – In the 1990s, the People's Republic of China imported BMP-3 weapon systems technology, and then they re-introduced the cannon. The Chinese production model of 2A72 was named ZPT-99. It was widely used by Chinese armored fighting vehicles.
  - ZTM-1, KBA-2 – Ukrainian production

== Ammunition ==
The 2A42 fires 30×165mm ammunition, a cartridge introduced in the 1970s in the Soviet Union to replace previous 30 mm autocannon cartridges. Other weapons using this size of cartridge case include the 2A38, 2A38M, and 2A72 autocannons for various vehicle, helicopter and air defence applications, as well as numerous single-, dual- and six-barrel naval and air force cannons. The 2A42, 2A38, 2A38M, and 2A72 fire percussion-primed ammunition; the naval and aerial cannons use electrical priming, and therefore their ammunition is not interchangeable with the land-based ammunition types, despite the same cartridge case size.

Originally three basic types of ammunition were developed in the Soviet Union for the land-based weapons: high-explosive incendiary, high-explosive fragmentation with tracer, and an armour-piercing ballistic capped with tracer. Later a sub-caliber armour-piercing round was introduced, and today also countries other than Soviet Union/Russia manufacture 30x165 mm percussion-prime ammunition. The main types of ammunition are summarized in the table below:

Designation	Type	Projectile weight (g)	Bursting charge (g)	Muzzle velocity (m/s)	Notes	Penetration
3UOF8	HEI	389 g (13.7 oz)	49 g (1.7 oz) A-IX-2	960 m/s (3,100 ft/s)	A high-explosive incendiary round with A-670M nose fuze. The fuze produces a 0.15 millisecond delay on impact, and a self-destruct mechanism detonating the projectile after 7.5 to 14.5 seconds of flight (3,900 to 5,000 m (12,800 to 16,400 ft) distance from muzzle).	N/A
3UOR6	HE-T	385 g (13.6 oz)	11.5 g (0.41 oz) A-IX-2	960 m/s (3,100 ft/s)	Nose-fuzed high-explosive fragmentation tracer round, utilizing the same A-670M impact/self-destruct fuze as the 3UOF8. Tracer burn time 14 seconds.	N/A
3UBR6	APBC-T	400 g (14 oz)	none	970 m/s (3,200 ft/s)	Solid shot with blunt penetrator covered by a hollow windshield cap. Tracer burn time 3.5 seconds.	20mm RHA at 60 degree impact, 700 m (2,300 ft) range; 22 mm (0.87 in) RHA at 60 degree impact, 500 m (1,600 ft) range
3UBR8	APDS	304 g (10.7 oz)	none	1120	A sub-caliber discarding sabot. No tracer.	25 mm (0.98 in) RHA at 60 degree impact, 1,500 m (4,900 ft)
3UBR10	APBC-T	398 g (14.0 oz)	none	970 m/s (3,200 ft/s)	A development of 3UBR6 with plastic driving band for reduced barrel wear. Expected to enter service in 2020	20 mm (0.79 in) RHA at 60 degree impact, 700 m (2,300 ft)
3UBR11	APFSDS-T		none		Modern APFSDS round, developed late 2010s. Production and service status unknown. 1.5 second tracer burn.	Unknown
M929	APFSDS-T	235 g (8.3 oz)	none	1,260 m/s (4,100 ft/s)	A sub-caliber fin-stabilized discarding sabot round with tracer from Belgian Mecar, with tungsten alloy penetrator.	More than 50 mm (2.0 in) RHA at 60 degree impact, 1,000 m (3,300 ft)

Airburst munitions for Russian 30mm and 57mm autocannons are in development.

== Platforms ==
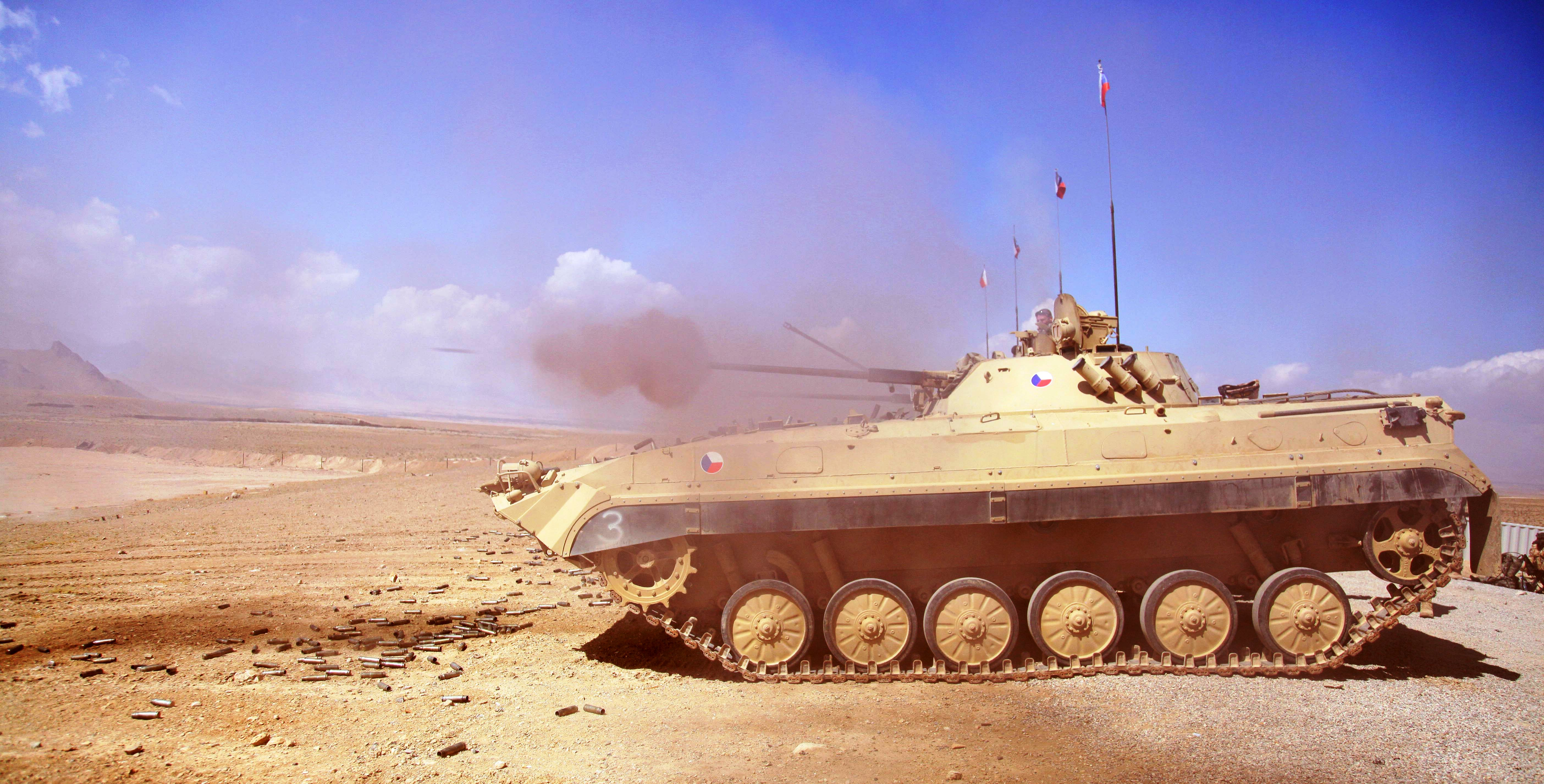
Czechoslovak-built BMP-2 in service with the Czech army in Afghanistan, September 2010.

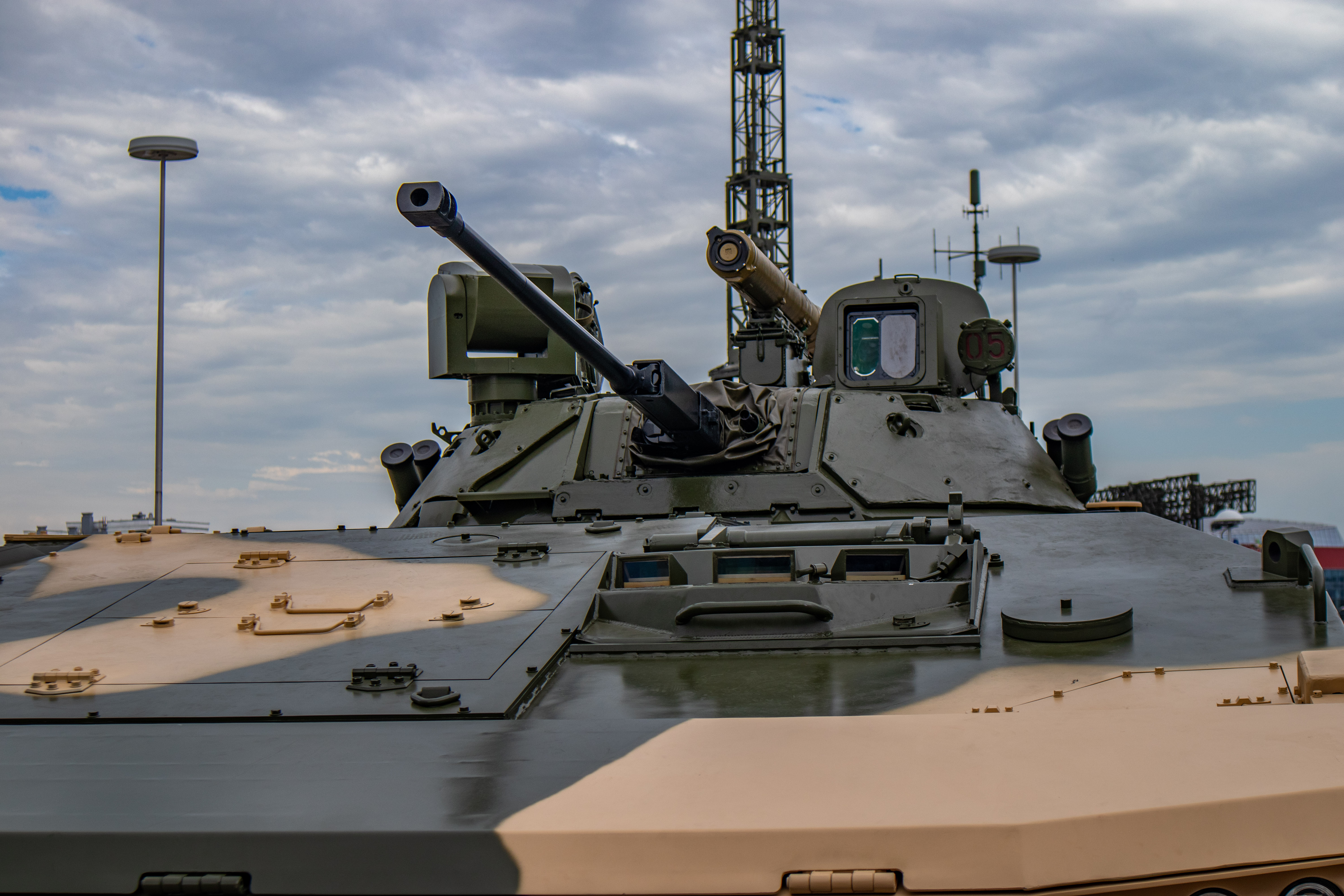
Turret of Belarusian-made Volat V2 APC, 2021.

The autocannon has been used since the 1980s on the following platforms:

Infantry fighting vehicles

- 2T Stalker
- MT-LBM 6MB
- BMP-1AM (2A72)
- BMP-2
- BMP-3 (2A72)
- BMD-2
- BMD-3
- BMD-4 (2A72)
- BTR-3 (2A72)
- BTR-4 (2A72)
- BTR-80A (2A72)
- BTR-82A (2A72)
- BTR-87
- BTR-90
- BTR-T
- GAZ Vodnik with BPPU module (2A72)
- BPsVI/BVP-M
- BMPT
- Fahd 280-30
- Boragh
- T-15 Armata
- VPK-7829 Bumerang
- Kurganets-25
- Lazar 3
- Makran IFV
- Scorpion IFV (2A72)
- Toros
- Tosan IFV
- Volat V2
- ZBD-86A (2A72)
- ZSL-92B (2A72)
- ZBD-03 (2A72)
- ZBD-04 (2A72)
- ZBD-05 (2A72)
- ZBL-08 (2A72)

MRAPs

- K-4386 Typhoon-VDV

Unmanned ground vehicles

- Bars BRShM (2A72)
- Uran-9 (2A72)
- UDAR UGV
- Vikhr UGV (2A72)

Attack helicopters

- Mil Mi-28
- Kamov Ka-29TB
- Kamov Ka-50
- Kamov Ka-52

Towed

- 2A42 gun fitted on D-44 gun carriage

== Similar 30mm autocannons ==
The 2A72 30mm autocannon, designed by KBP Instrument Design Bureau, is a lighter, less complex cousin of the 2A42, with a longer barrel. While the latter has 578 parts, 2A72 has only 349 parts, allowing it to weigh only 84 kg (with 36 kg barrel). 2A72 uses long recoil principle, resulting in lower recoil (7t instead of 20), but lower rate of fire (300-330 instead of 550). 2A72 is used in:

- BMP-3 – mounted in between 2A70 100 mm gun/launcher and PKT coaxial MG
- ABM-M30M3 – remote Weapon Station made by Impulse-2, for Uran-9 or different armored vehicles.
- ABM-M30M3 Vikhr – another remote weapon station made by Impulse-2.
- TRT-30 – remote weapon station.

The 2A38 and 2A38M are 30mm twin-barrel autocannons, Gast-type. They are mainly used on air defense vehicles like 2K22 Tunguska and Pantsir-S1. It weighs 195 kg and has a maximum rate of fire of 2500 rd/min.

The Ordnance Factory Medak in India has developed the Medak gun and CRN 91 Naval Gun out of this platform.

== Users ==
Current operators

- Algeria
- China
- Czech Republic
- Egypt
- Finland
- India
- Iraq
- Iran
- Russian Federation
- Serbia
- Slovakia
- Syria
- Ukraine
- Viet Nam

Former operators

- Soviet Union
- Czechoslovakia

== See also ==
- List of Russian weaponry
- 2A42 Cobra
- M242 Bushmaster 25mm chain gun
- Mk44 Bushmaster II
- Bushmaster III
- Bushmaster IV
- M230 chain gun
- Medak gun
