= Bumerang-BM =

Bumerang-BM or DUBM-30 Epoch
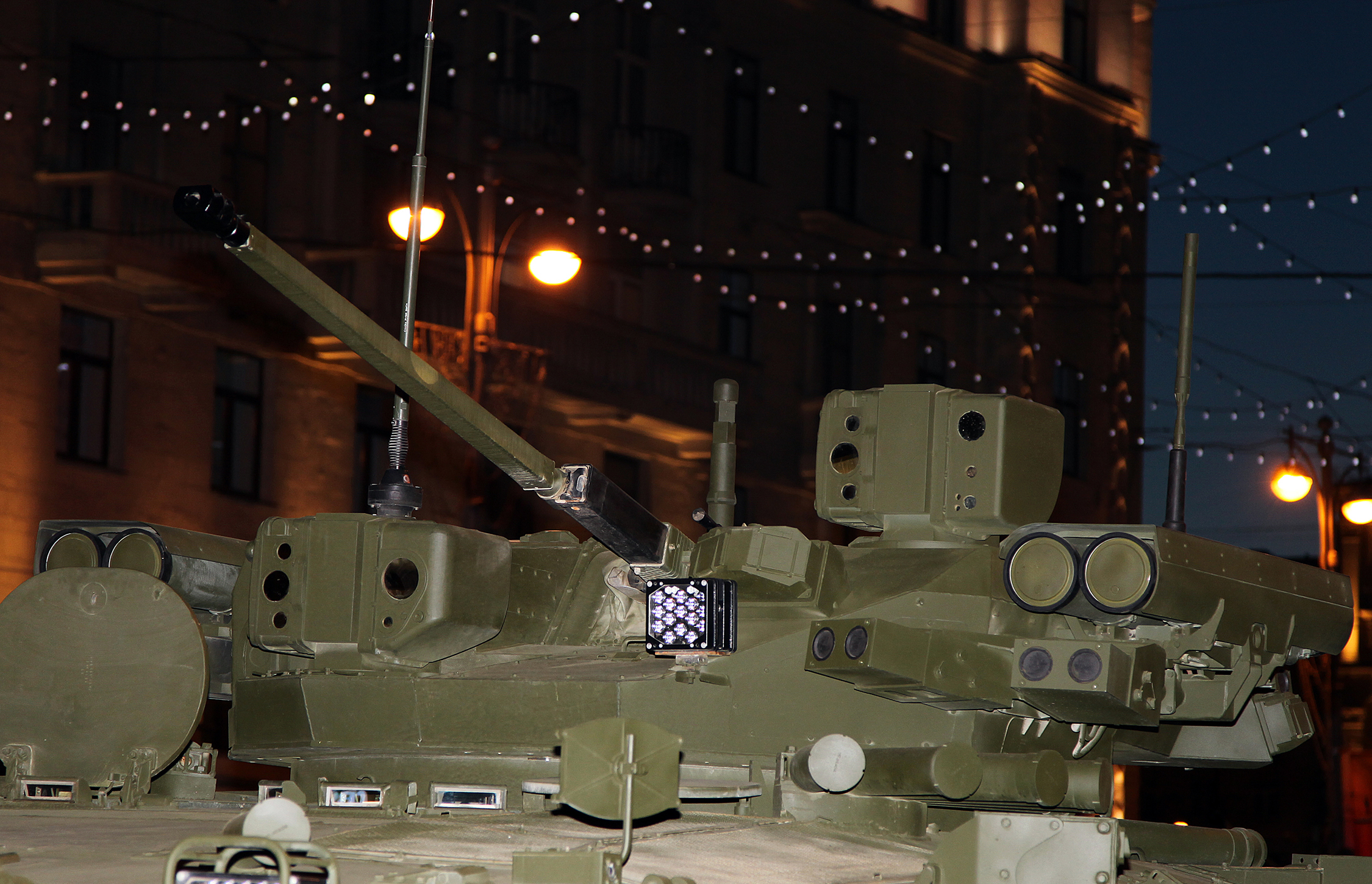
- The turret mounted on a Kurganets-25 IFV
- Type: Remote weapon station
- Place of origin: Russia

Service history
- Used by: Russian Armed Forces

Production history
- Designer: KBP Instrument Design Bureau
- Produced: 2015-present

Specifications
- Crew: 0 (remotely controlled)
- Main armament: 2A42 30 mm auto cannon with 500 rounds (AP/HE); 4 Kornet-EM
- Secondary armament: 7.62 mm coaxial PKT

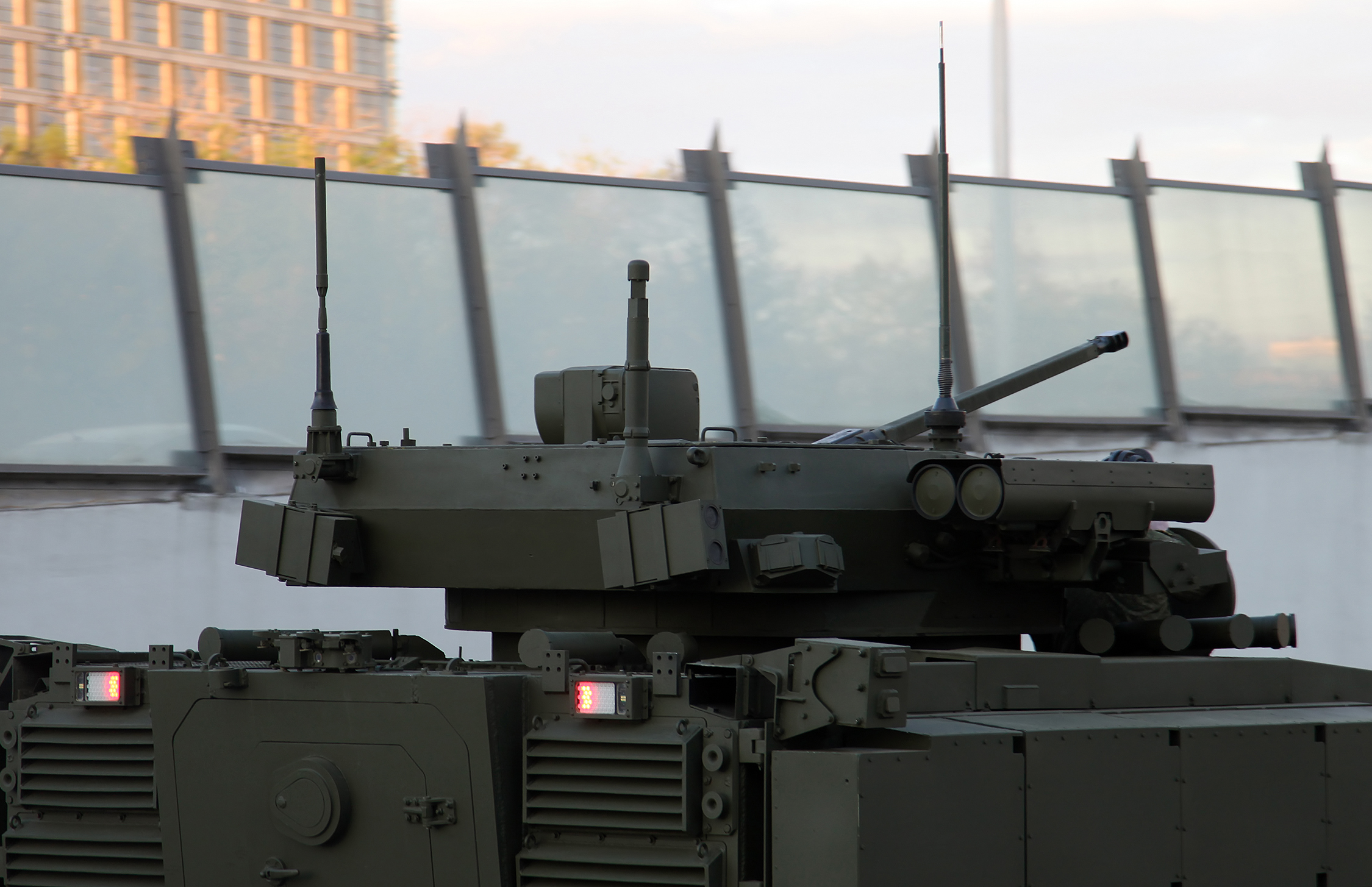
Rear view of the turret mounted on a Kurganets-25 IFV

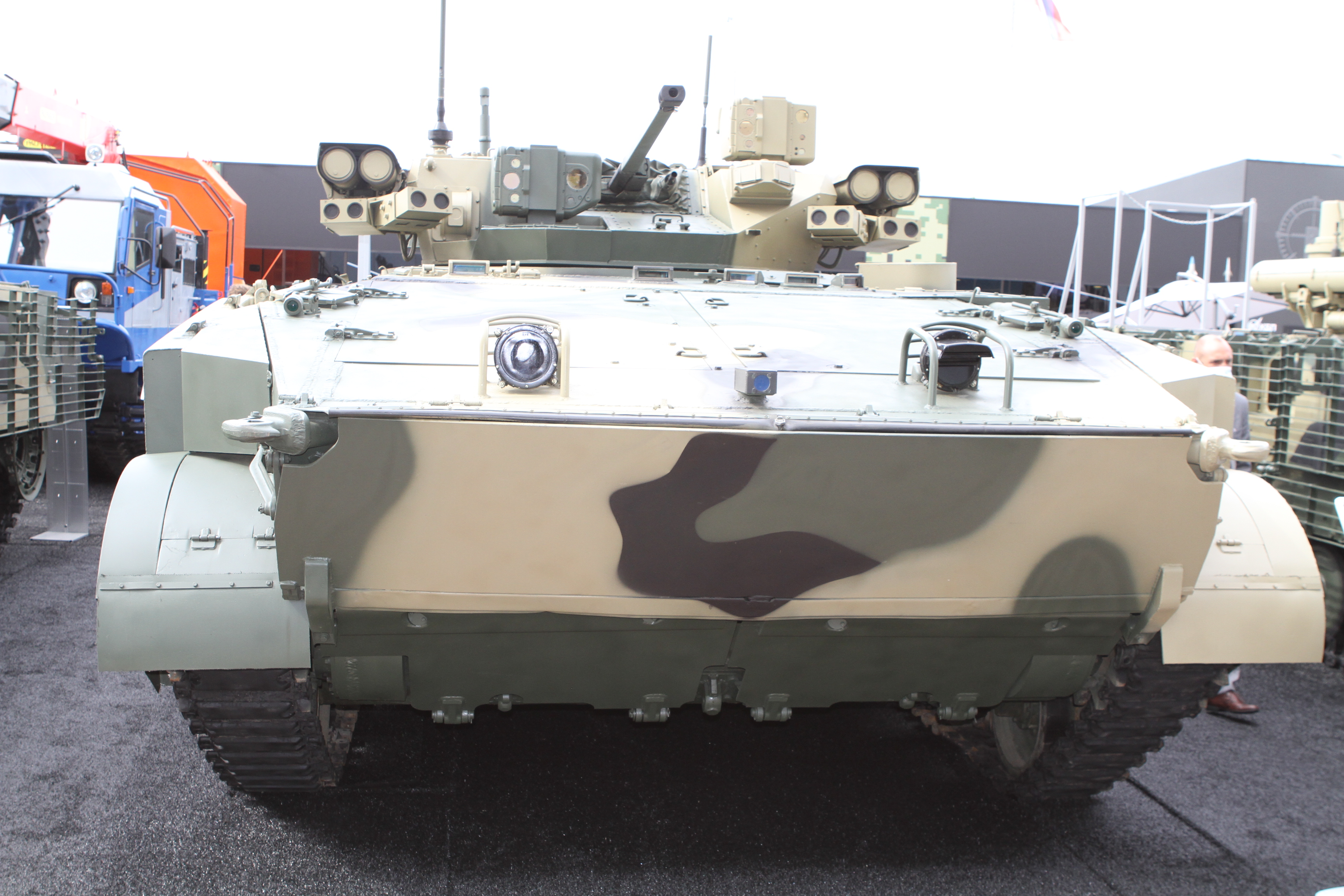
Front view of the turret mounted on a BMP-3 IFV

The Bumerang-BM (Russian: Бумеранг-БМ) or DUBM-30 Epoch is a remotely controlled turret for the T-15 Armata heavy IFV, Kurganets-25 and Bumerang platforms. It was first seen in public in 2015 during rehearsals for the Moscow Victory Day Parade, mounted on those three platforms.

== Design ==
The turret is designed by the KBP Instrument Design Bureau.

=== Armament ===
The main armament is the 2A42 30 mm auto cannon with 500 rounds consisting of 160 AP and 340 HE shells with effective firing ranges of 4,000 m (2.5 mi) and 1,500 m respectively, along with a coaxial 7.62 mm PKT machine gun with 2,000 rounds.

The turret has a pair of Kornet-EM anti-tank guided missiles (ATGMs) on either side, enabling it to salvo fire two missiles at once, either at separate targets or to "double tap" the same one to overwhelm active protection systems.

The turret comes with a wide range of modern sensory, target acquisition and target tracking equipment which can engage targets day and night at maximum range of 5,500 m (3.4 mi).

== Operators ==
- Russia

== See also ==
- Bumerang – (Russia)
- Kurganets-25 – (Russia)
- T-15 Armata – (Russia)
