= 12N360 =

Russian four-stroke diesel engine

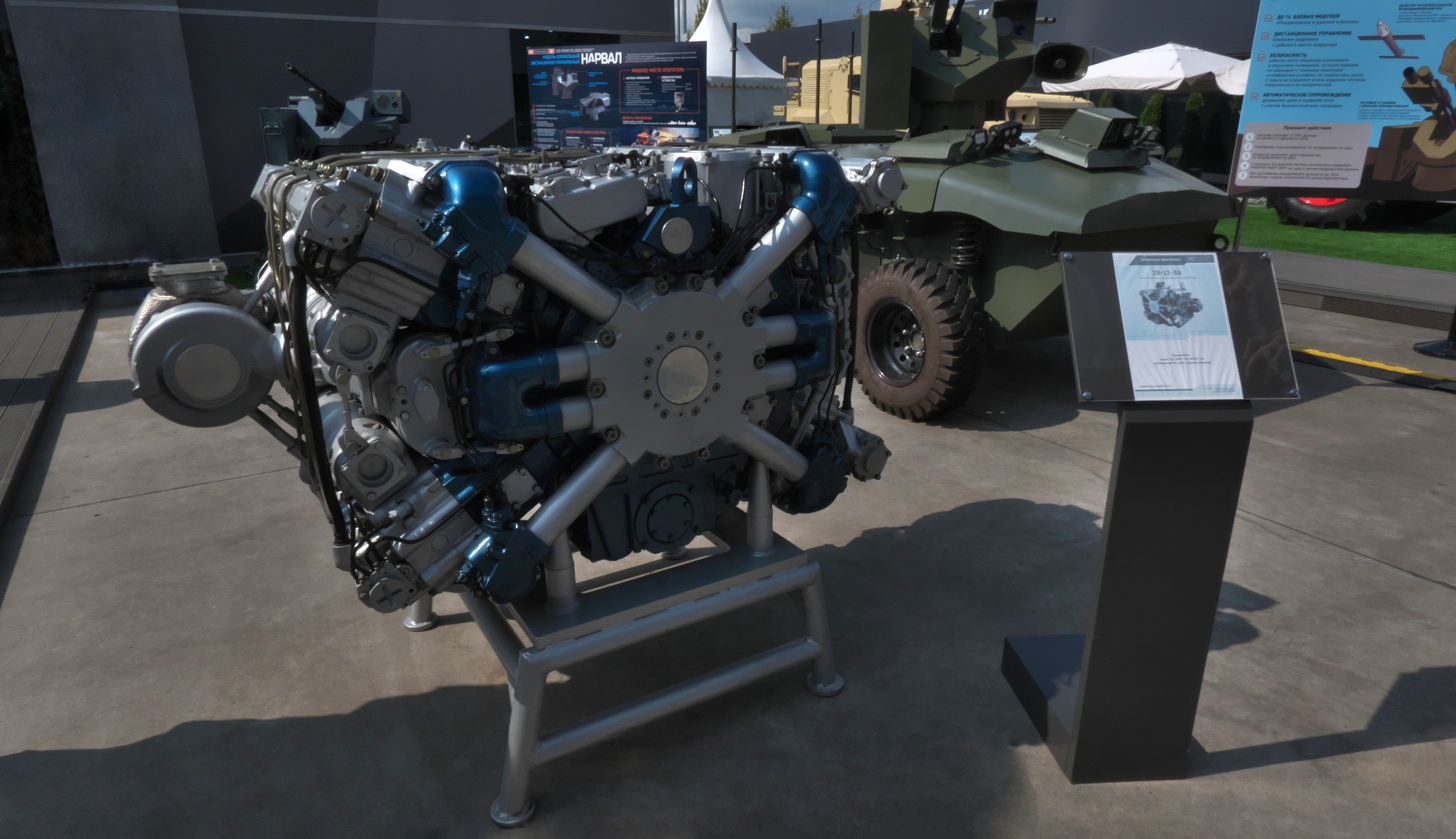
The 12N360

The 12N360 (Russian: 12Н360; other designations are A-85-3A or 2V-12-3A) diesel engine is a Russian four-stroke diesel engine produced by the Chelyabinsk Tractor Plant. The water-cooled twelve-cylinder X-engine with direct injection was developed to power the Armata Universal Combat Platform, on which the T-14 tank, among others, is based.

== Development ==
Development of the 12N360 began as early as the 1970s. In 1977 a first prototype with an output of 1200 hp and the designation 12ChN was running. At the time, the Soviet leadership favored the gas turbine and the two-stroke 5TDF opposed-piston engine for tank propulsion, and no funds were made available for further development of the 12ChN. Also, the later development of the V-2 series into the V-93 with 1120 hp showed that this V12 engine still had potential.

== Design ==
The 12N360 is a turbocharged, horizontal X engine with 12 cylinders. The X design makes it much more compact than its predecessor, the V-93 (Chelyabinsk Tractor Plant), and similar in size to the 5TDF and 6TDF two-stroke opposed-piston engines (Malyshev Factory).

== Technical data ==
| Number of cylinders | 12 |
| Displacement | 34,593 cc (2,111.0 cu in; 34.593 L) |
| Max. Torque | 5,252.5 N⋅m (3,874.0 lb⋅ft) |
| Length | 813 mm (32.0 in) |
| Width | 1,300 mm (51 in) |
| Height | 820 mm (32 in) |
| Mass | 1,550 kg (3,420 lb) |
| Rated power | 1,500 PS (1,100 kW) |
| Rated speed | 2000 RPM |
| Specific fuel consumption | 217.9 g / kWh |
