= BTR-T =

Russian prototype heavy armored personnel carrier

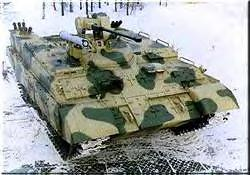
- A Russian BTR-T
- Type: Heavy armored personnel carrier
- Place of origin: Russia

Production history
- Designer: Omsktransmash
- Designed: 1994–1996
- Manufacturer: Omsktransmash
- Unit cost: US$640,110 (equivalent to $1,253,814 in 2024) with 30mm cannon and US$440,180 (equivalent to $862,202 in 2024) without cannon
- Produced: 1997 (cancelled)

Specifications
- Mass: 38.5 metric tons (85,000 lb)
- Length: 6.45 meters (21.2 ft)
- Width: 3.27 meters (10.7 ft)
- Height: 2.4 meters (7.9 ft)
- Crew: 2 (+5 passengers)
- Armor: 600 mm max with ERA
- Main armament: Turret with either 2A42 30mm autocannon and 9M113 Konkurs ATGMs or 2A42 and AGS-30 or twin 30mm 2A38M autocannons or 12.7mm NSV machine gun and AGS-17D grenade launcher
- Engine: diesel V-55 with 12 cylinders 620hp
- Power/weight: 187hp/tons
- Suspension: torsion bar
- Operational range: 500 kilometres (310 mi)
- Maximum speed: 50 km/h off-road: 25 kilometres per hour (16 mph)

The BTR-T (Russian: Бронетранспортёр-Тяжелый, romanized: Bronetransporter-Tyazhelyy, lit. 'Armored Transporter–Heavy') was a Russian heavy armored personnel carrier (APC), designed by the Design Bureau of Transport Machine-Building (Omsktransmash) state-run production association.

== Description ==
The vehicle is based on the hull of the T-55 tank and answers the need for a heavy, well protected and well armed vehicle adapted to urban combat. The need for a heavy APC appeared after the First Chechen War during which APCs like the BTR-80 were annihilated in urban areas at the hands of Chechen rebels using RPG shoulder-launched anti-tank weapons. Consequently, the design incorporates the T-55 tank's thick hull armor, with built-in Kontakt-5 reactive armour. It also had a heavier armament (similar to the BMP-2) with sufficient elevation to engage targets in multi-story buildings.

First appearance of this vehicle was in exhibition in Omsk in 1997. Due to lack of funding, the vehicle never had adequate testing and never entered service in the Russian military. There is no information about the number of vehicles converted. No export contracts have been signed.

== Design ==
The choice of the T-55 hull rather than that of a more modern tank was decided on as an efficiency measure and also probably to validate a conversion for the many T-55s in use around the world. It was influenced by Israel's IDF Achzarit that created virtually the same modifications in the 1980s.

After removing T-55 gun and heavy turret, designers used a light, low-profile turret with a basket under it. The gunner was supposed to sit in that basket and rotate together with the turret. By removing stocks of 100 mm ammunition and using a space where empty shells were discarded inside the vehicle, designers made a space for five fully-equipped infantrymen (plus driver and gunner). That was not enough to make it a decent personnel carrier. With turret and armament similar to BMP-2 and 5+2 people inside, it turned out to be the first Russian heavy IFV rather than a heavy APC.

The roof plate of the hull was replaced with a new one that had four hatches for entering and leaving the vehicle. Frontal armor, side armor and roof plate were reinforced with Kontakt-5 ERA blocks. The side of the vehicle was reinforced with spaced armor and rubber side skirts. Armored fuel tanks were positioned in the rear of the vehicle. Floor armor plate was reinforced with anti-mine protection.

== Armament ==
The turret can accommodate several weapon configurations:

- 2A42 30 mm autocannon.
  - 9M113 Konkurs ATGMs.
- 2A42 30 mm autocannon.
  - 30mm AGS-17 automatic grenade launcher.
- Twin 2A38 30 mm autocannons.
- 12.7×108 mm NSV heavy machine gun.
  - 9M113 Konkurs ATGMs.
- 12.7×108 mm NSV heavy machine gun.
  - 30 mm AGS-17 automatic grenade launcher.

== See also ==
- IDF Achzarit
- BMPT Terminator
- VIU-55 Munja
- Sabiex HIFV UAE HIFV developed from OF-40
- Type 59 HIFV Chinese (heavy) infantry fighting vehicle developed from Type 59, chinese version of the T-54/T-55
- BMPV-64 (uk:БМПВ-64): A Ukrainian heavy infantry combat vehicle based on the T-64 chassis.
