= 9M133M Kornet-M =

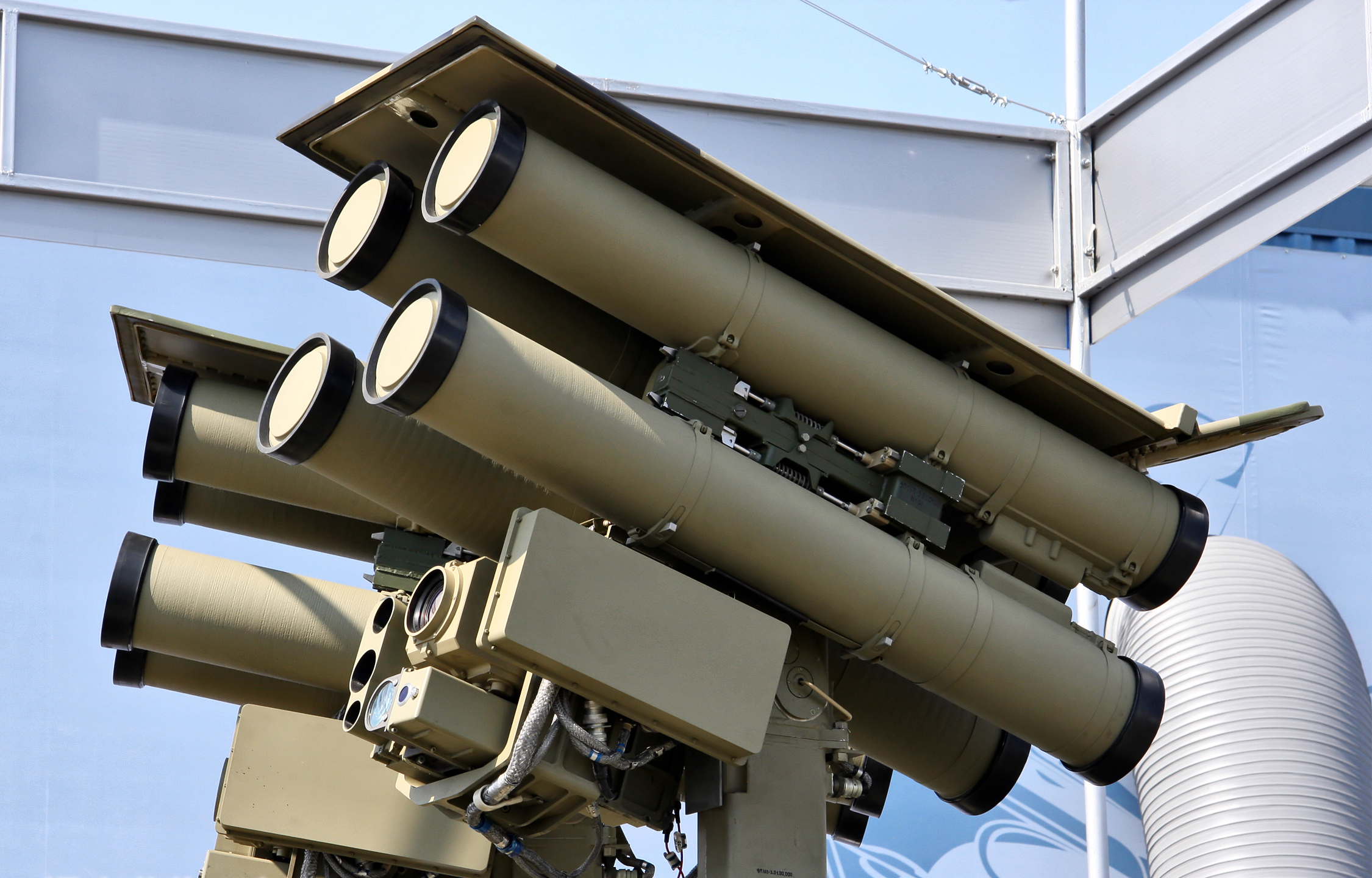
- Kornet-EM missiles on a Kornet-D.
- Type: Anti-tank missile
- Place of origin: Russia

Service history
- In service: 2015–present
- Used by: See Users

Production history
- Designed: 2011
- Manufacturer: KBP Instrument Design Bureau
- Produced: 2012
- No. built: Unknown

Specifications
- Mass: 31 kg (with launch tube)
- Length: 1,210 mm
- Warhead: Tandem-HEAT, thermobaric
- Warhead weight: Thermobaric: 7–10 kg equivalent of TNT
- Detonation mechanism: Impact fuze
- Blast yield: 1,000+ mm RHA after ERA
- Operational range: 8,000 m (anti-tank warhead); 10,000 m (thermobaric warhead)
- Maximum speed: 300 m/s
- Launch platform: Kornet-D, T-15 Armata, Raptor-class patrol boat

The 9M133M Kornet-M (also known by the export designation 9M133 Kornet-EM) Russian anti-tank guided missile (ATGM) is an improved version of the 9M133 Kornet ATGM, with increased range and an improved warhead.

Kornet-EM missiles are chiefly used on the Kornet-D system. Kornet-M missiles are also compatible with standard Kornet man-portable tripod launchers.

== Design ==
Introduced in 2012, its vehicle mounted version is equipped with an automatic target tracker. Instead of manually placing the crosshairs on target throughout the missiles flight, the operator designates a target once and the computer tracks the target as the missile travels towards it. The beam riding system also allows a vehicle equipped with twin launchers to attack two different targets at once, increasing its rate of fire, decreases the number of vehicles needed for a mission, and can defeat vehicles equipped with an active protection system through salvo fire at one target. The system's use of an autotracker can make it more effective against low-flying aerial threats like helicopters and unmanned aerial vehicles (UAVs). Like the Kornet, the Kornet-M is designed to defeat vehicles with explosive reactive armor via a tandem-warhead. There are also Kornet-M variants equipped with thermobaric warheads. Russia has developed a new X-UAV guided aircraft missile.

== Users ==
- Algeria
- Bahrain
- Cameroon
- Iran (licensed production)
- Russia
- Saudi Arabia (licensed production)
- Serbia (introduced in 2021)
- Syria
