= Obiekt 187 =

- Type: Main battle tank
- Place of origin: Soviet Union

Service history
- In service: Never, prototype only

Production history
- Designer: Vladimir Ivanovich Potkin (chief designer); UKBTM - Ural Design Bureau of Transport Machine-Building
- Designed: late 1980s - middle 1990s
- Manufacturer: Uralvagonzavod
- Variants: 6

Specifications
- Mass: 50 metric tons
- Crew: 3
- Armour: 950 mm (maximum physical thickness, not counting the reactive armor); Composite armour / reactive armour (turret and hull front); Rolled homogeneous armour (rest of the tank)
- Main armament: 125 mm 2A66 smoothbore tank gun (48 calibers long barrel)
- Secondary armament: 7.62 mm coaxial PKT machine gun 12.7 mm NSVT heavy machine gun
- Engine: А-85-2 diesel engine 1200 hp

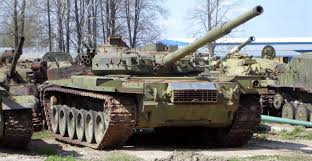
Object 187 Number 3

Object 187 (Объект 187) was a Soviet experimental main battle tank developed between the late 1980s and the mid-1990s. It remains a relatively unpublicized development because of high levels of secrecy surrounding the project.

== Design ==
The tank was equipped with cutting-edge systems and structural solutions, losing many of the traditional shortcomings of Soviet tanks. Originally, the design was intended to be only a temporary solution before the development of new combat platforms. Obiekt 187 was a parallel project to Obiekt 188, the T-90 tank. It was based on the T-72B, with a heavily modified turret. A particularly notable feature was the rejection of the T-64 hull design. The redesigned layout took up more space, but positively affected ergonomics and protection from the glacis plate. Due to lengthening of the hull's nose section, the driver's position was lower, with his optics attached to the roof of the hull, unlike in the T-64 and its derivatives. This remedied a notorious weak spot of the T-64 design – the section between the turret and the hull. The same solution made it possible to arrange armouring at more rational angles of inclination as a countermeasure to modern sub-caliber armour-piercing rounds. The tank was fitted with a new welded turret, unlike traditional cast ones, fabricated using steel rolled homogeneous armour (RHA). Work on the welded turrets of Obiekt 187, Obiekt 188 (T-90) and the future T-80UD was carried out almost simultaneously. The turret of Obiekt 187 was characterized by an imposing overall size, especially in the rear section.

The 902A "Tucha" grenade launcher was fitted to deploy smoke and aerosol screens, and vehicle snorkel equipment was also installed.

Several types of power plants and transmissions were tested on the different modifications, including a gas turbine engine. The most promising of the power plants in the course of tests proved to be the 1200 hp А-85-2 engine. It was installed in a longitudinal configuration, similar to the T-34. A new undercarriage and hydraulic shock absorbers substantially increased dynamic abilities.

=== Main armament ===
During testing, some of the Obiekt 187 prototypes were fitted with the 125 mm (4.9 in) 2A46M smoothbore gun of the T-80B. Planned primary armament of the tank though was the ballistically improved 125 mm 2A66 (also known as D-91T) smoothbore gun. Together with the tank gun, new depleted uranium-cored sub-caliber armour-piercing fin-stabilized discarding sabot (APFSDS) rounds were developed named Anker-1 and Anker-2, and new HEAT shells, and gun-launched anti-tank missiles. The 2A66 had a different appearance to the 2A46M. A muzzle brake was installed primarily to keep a clear line-of-sight for the missile guidance system, while also decreasing effective recoil from the more powerful new gun. The barrel was strengthened, with chamber volume increased to accommodate the larger round and incremented charge. The tank was equipped with the most advanced fire control system of the time. Something similar began to appear more widely on tanks in the late 1990s.

The 2A66 was based on the 2A46M as a transitional version between the 2A26 gun and the new generation 2A82 smoothbore gun. The 125 mm 2A82 was tested earlier (late 1970s) on the experimental tank Obiekt 785. Obiekt 785 was also tested with a 130 mm rifled gun. While Obiekt 187 was in development work on yet another experimental tank was also in progress. This was the Obiekt 292, armed with a much more powerful 152.4 mm rifled gun. Similar projects, mainly for up-arming, existed in Western countries. A few years prior to Obiekt 187, the US developed the CATTB M1 variant, armed with a 140 mm gun. Some years later, Germany developed the Leopard 2-140, armed again with a 140 mm gun. Later, the Swiss developed the Pz 87-140, armed with a 140mm gun and with additional armour. Enhancement was limited largely to armament in these programs, however, while the Obiekt 187 was focused on an extreme level of protection, surpassing all third generation tanks even today. New generations of tanks though potentially combine or surpass Cold-War developments. The Chinese Type 99KM is an example of possible superiority, armed with a powerful 125 mm gun firing next generation kinetic rounds or precision guided missiles, and using a more effective active protection system. The Russian Obiekt 195 prototype had a level of firepower which has not been matched by many other prospective designs, including the very powerful 152 mm 2A83 smoothbore gun, and a 30 mm coaxial cannon.

=== Armour ===
The Obiekt 187 used composite armour for the turret and the hull front, and RHA for the rest of the tank. The passive armour was supplemented by the new Malakhit explosive reactive armour, a prototype of the present Relikt, and by the Shtora active protection system. It also had a chemical, biological, radiological, and nuclear (CBRN) protection system. Maximum physical thickness of the passive armour was up to 950 mm (37 in). It possibly consisted of special materials including ceramic or high density uranium alloys.

== History ==
Work on the tank was conducted by the Ural Design Bureau of Transport Machine-Building under a T-72B improvement program with an order dated June 19, 1986. Conceived as a next-generation development, it was designed to fulfill operational requirements not then met by the rest of the main battle tanks built by Uralvagonzavod. Different prototypes of Obiekt 187 were built in three series. Each series differed significantly from the previous, clearly demonstrating the evolution of the tank. The interior differences were less significant.

The first modification was a change to an 840 hp engine. The tank was equipped with the Kontakt-5 explosive reactive armour. That modification was dismantled after its trials and its hull used for the third modification. The whole power plant of the tank was later used on the Obiekt 188 (T-90).

A 1000 hp engine was installed on the second modification. Trials showed a high level of protection against contemporary weapons. The first and the second prototype series were the closest in appearance to the future T-90 tank.

The third modification was intended originally for diverse experiments testing for possible structural failure; it was never fully equipped. Unlike the first and second prototype series, the 3rd series had a new welded turret made out of RHA plates with a thickness of 40 mm each. The turret closely resembled those of the T-90S, T-90SA and T-90A. Their turret design was later based on the third prototype series turret, with its similar lowered driver position, etc. The tank was originally equipped with a 1000 hp engine, but as an experiment the 1250 hp gas-turbine engine and transmission of the T-80U was fitted with a corresponding change in the hydro-shock absorbers, and the result sent to trials. Trials indicated the diesel engine was superior to the gas-turbine one. An Obiekt 187 prototype underwent complex tests for anti-nuclear defense at the Arzamas-16 nuclear center. This tank was equipped with the Kontakt-5 explosive reactive armour.

The fourth modification prototype was similar to the third before engine and transmission changes. It had a new, larger, welded turret. That modification was equipped with the 1200 hp А-85-2 engine. It also received the new Malakhit explosive reactive armour, a prototype of the present Relikt, with reaction plates made of sufficiently massive titanium plates.

The fifth and sixth modifications were the most advanced. The difference between them was in the transmission. The fifth had a mechanical transmission while the sixth was using a hydro-transmission. Both modifications used the 1200 hp А-85-2 engine. The nose section of the hull was increased in size even more, and changed in form. Armour protection of the turret was significantly improved and it was increased in size again, reaching a width of 3.12 meters (without explosive reactive armour); the widest rear of all welded turret Soviet tanks. These modifications had the same Malakhit explosive reactive armour as the fourth modification, except that the reaction plates were made of steel instead of titanium.

=== Status ===
Uralvagonzavod undertook enormous efforts for this tank to be adopted, but in the end after successful trials proving high combat and technical potential, the tank was not accepted in part due to old ammunition of 2A46 not being reusable by 2A66, making costs prohibitively high. Instead, the preferred project was the Obiekt 188 (T-90), which was a symbiosis of the T-72B's hull and some of the Obiekt 187's systems. According to its chief designer Vladimir Ivanovich Potkin, Obiekt 187 should have become the foundation for design and production of an entire future family of Soviet tanks, and to serve as a foundation for more advanced and powerful tanks.

Even today secrecy around this tank remains. Technical data about it is largely estimated. The scale model of Obiekt 187 model No. 6 remains under wraps on the Ural Design Bureau of Transport Machine-Building premises. This model was built by employees and there is a possibility it could be transferred to the armor museum of Uralvagonzavod for storage and exhibition. Persistent requests by the armor museum of Uralvagonzavod for transfer of at least one Obiekt 187 for restoration and display have been rebuffed. However, according to some sources, Kubinka Tank Museum plans to conduct a repair of the remaining tanks with a subsequent open demonstration.

== See also ==
- Obiekt 292
- T-14 Armata
