= Saab Sensores e Serviços =

Saab Sensores e Serviços Brasil
- Type: Subsidiary
- Industry: Aerospace
- Founded: 2020; 6 years ago
- Headquarters: São Bernardo do Campo, Brazil
- Parent: Saab AB
- Website: saab.com

Saab Sensores e Serviços Brasil is a Brazilian defence electronic manufacturer which has operated since 2020 as a subsidiary company of the Saab AB. Previously established in 2004 as Atmos Sistemas S.A to provide electronic equipment and weather radars, it was bought entirely by the Swedish multinational to manufacture and sell electronic products and avionics for the aerospace industry, and to supply the parts and maintenance needs of the Saab JAS 39 Gripen aircraft of the Brazilian Air Force.

Currently the company provides both technical support, equipment components and electronic and maintenance services to the Brazilian armed forces in the defense field, as well as to civilian customers.

== See also ==
- Saab Aeronáutica Montagens
- Ares Aeroespacial e Defesa
