= T-14 Armata =

Russian main battle tank

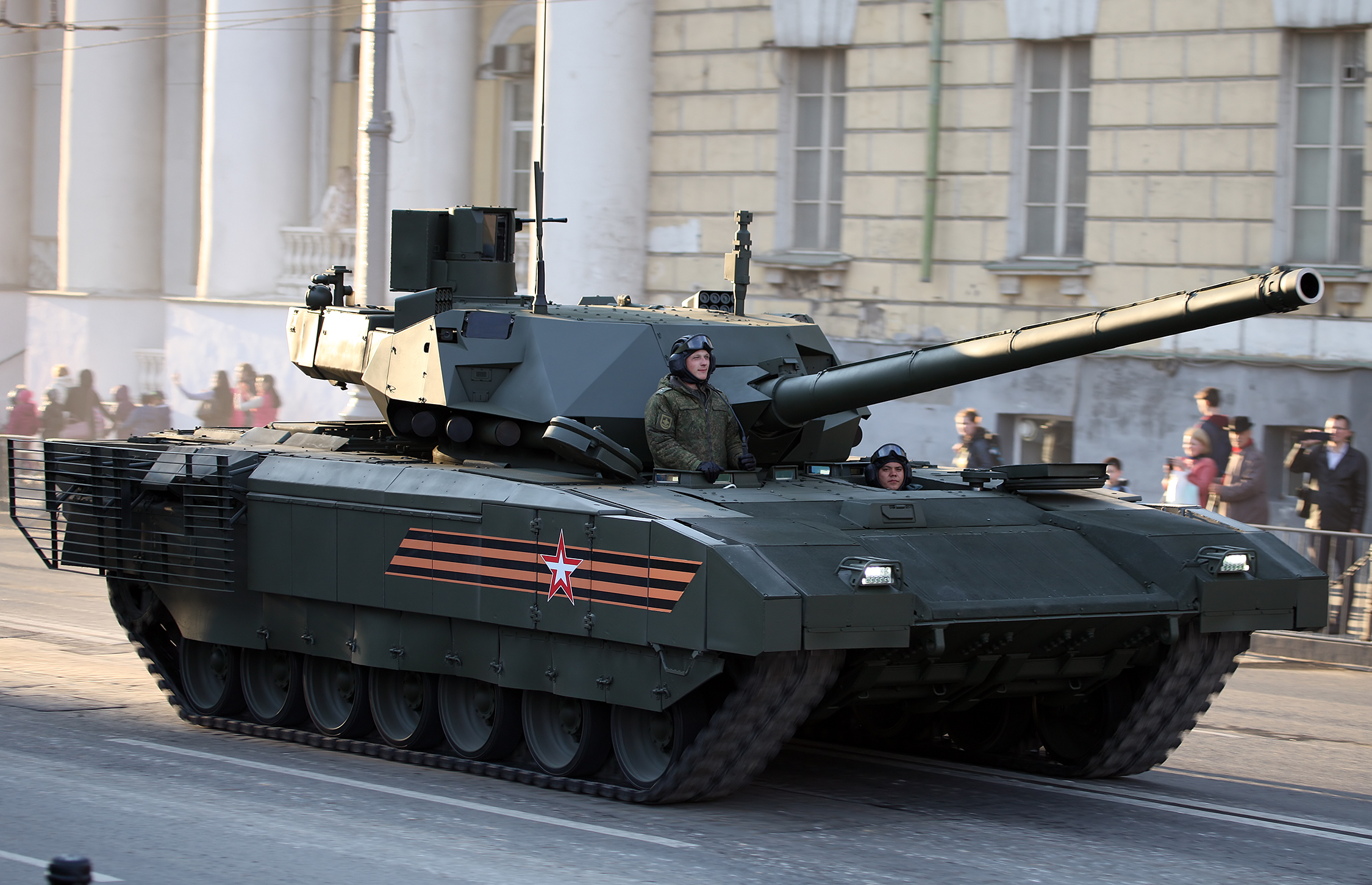
- A Russian Army T-14 Armata tank in rehearsal for Victory Day celebrations
- Type: Main battle tank
- Place of origin: Russia

Production history
- Designer: Ural Design Bureau of Transport Machine-Building, Uralvagonzavod
- Designed: 2014
- Manufacturer: Uralvagonzavod
- Unit cost: $3.7–$4.6 million in 2015 $5–7.1 million in 2022
- Produced: 2014–2021 (prototypes), 2021–present (claimed serial production)
- No. built: Unknown/Low tens

Specifications
- Mass: 55 tonnes
- Length: 10.7 m (35 ft)
- Width: 3.5 m (11 ft)
- Height: 3.3 m (11 ft)
- Crew: 3
- Calibre: 125 mm (4.92 in)
- Effective firing range: 5 km, Uralvagonzavod claims
- Maximum firing range: 12 km, Uralvagonzavod claims
- Armour: 44S-sv-Sh Steel
- Main armament: 2A82-1M 125 mm smoothbore cannon with 45 rounds (of which, 32 in the autoloader). Future version may use the smoothbore 2A83 152 mm tank gun.
- Secondary armament: 12.7 mm (1/2 in) Kord machine gun (6P49), 7.62 mm (0.30 in) PKTM machine gun (6P7К)
- Engine: 12N360 Twin Turbo Diesel; 1,100 kW (1,500 hp)
- Power/weight: 20.4 kW/t (27.3 hp/t)
- Transmission: 12-speed automatic gearbox
- Suspension: Hydropneumatic suspension
- Operational range: Min. 500 kilometres (310 mi)
- Maximum speed: 75–80 km/h (47–50 mph) (estimated)

The T-14 Armata (Russian: Т-14 «Армата»; industrial designation Russian: Объект 148, romanized: Obyekt 148, lit. 'Object 148') is a Russian fourth-generation main battle tank (MBT) based on the Armata Universal Combat Platform.

The Russian Army initially planned to acquire 2,300 T-14s between 2015 and 2020. By 2018, production and fiscal shortfalls delayed this to 2025, before Russia announced the apparent cancellation of the main production run on 30 July 2018. However, as of 2021, the Russian state-owned TASS media agency claimed the Armata had been expected to begin serial production in 2022, with delivery of a test batch of 100 to the 2nd Guards Tamanskaya Motor Rifle Division expected to begin in 2022. The tanks are planned to only be officially transferred following completion of all state tests. In December 2021 the Russian state conglomerate Rostec stated that serial production had commenced, with "more than 40" Armata tanks anticipated to be delivered to Russian troops after 2023. On 4 March 2024, Sergey Chemezov, the CEO of Rostec, stated that the T-14 Armata had entered service with the Russian Armed Forces. This claim has not been confirmed.

== History ==
After the cancellation of the T-95 in 2010, Uralvagonzavod began the OKR Armata (Armament) design study. The study resulted in the Object 148 based on the T-95 (itself based on the Object 187). The Russian Army curtailed T-90 orders beginning in 2012 to prepare for the arrival of the new tank.

The T-14 first publicly appeared in March 2015, when several tanks with covered turrets were seen loaded on train carriage in Alabino. It was subsequently revealed on 9 May during the 2015 Moscow Victory Day Parade. During the 2015 rehearsals, one of the tanks suddenly stopped moving, and after attempts to tow it failed, it moved away under its own power after about 15 minutes.

At least seven T-14 Armata tanks appeared in the 2015 and 2016 Moscow Victory Day parade, five in 2017 and 2018. Four were anticipated in promotional materials in advance of the 2019 parade.

The state trials of the tank started in early 2020. This became known in April 2020, when Minister of Industry and Trade Denis Manturov stated the T-14 has already been tested in combat conditions on the territory of the Syrian Arab Republic. Subsequently in July 2020, testing of an unmanned version of the T-14 called "Tachanka-B" (Russian: Тачанка-Б) was announced.

In November 2022, The Moscow Times and Newsweek reported that the state program under which the T-14 Armata is being developed had been halted because the 2022 Russian invasion of Ukraine necessitated radical changes to the planned expenditure for urgent needs. The same month, several videos and photos of T-14s appeared on social media, apparently training at the same grounds as Russian military personnel who were mobilized. The videos were located to a training ground in Kazan, where cadets of the Kazan Higher Tank Command School train. On 4 March 2024, Sergey Chemezov, CEO of Rostec corporation, stated that T-14 Armata entered service with the Russian Armed Forces.

=== Procurement ===
In 2016 the Russian Defence Ministry announced that it had signed a contract for a "test batch" of 100 T-14 tanks to be delivered by 2020, with the full project to be extended until 2025.

In July 2018, Deputy Prime Minister for Defence and Space Industry Yury Borisov said there is currently no need to mass-produce the Armata when its older predecessors, namely the latest variants of the T-72, remain "effective against American, German and French counterparts", saying, "Why flood our military with Armatas, the T-72s are in great demand on the market(s)." Instead, a modernization program of the T-72s, T-80s and T-90s in-service will take precedence. In August 2018, at the ARMY2018 Forum outside Moscow, the Russian Ministry of Defense signed a contract for the purchase of 32 T-14s tanks and 100 T-15 infantry fighting vehicles, with delivery to be finished by 2021.

In February 2019 it was announced that the first 12 tanks would be delivered by the end of that year. In August 2019, the Russian Military-Industrial Courier reported that out of a contractually agreed 132 Armata-platform vehicles over three years to 2021 (including T-14 tanks, and also T-15 IFVs and T-16 BREM ARVs (ru:Т-16 (БРЭМ)), assuming production of 44 vehicles a year, only 16 would be delivered by the end of 2019. This implied a shortfall of at least 28 vehicles that year. By November 2019 the delivery forecast slipped to "late 2019 or early 2020."

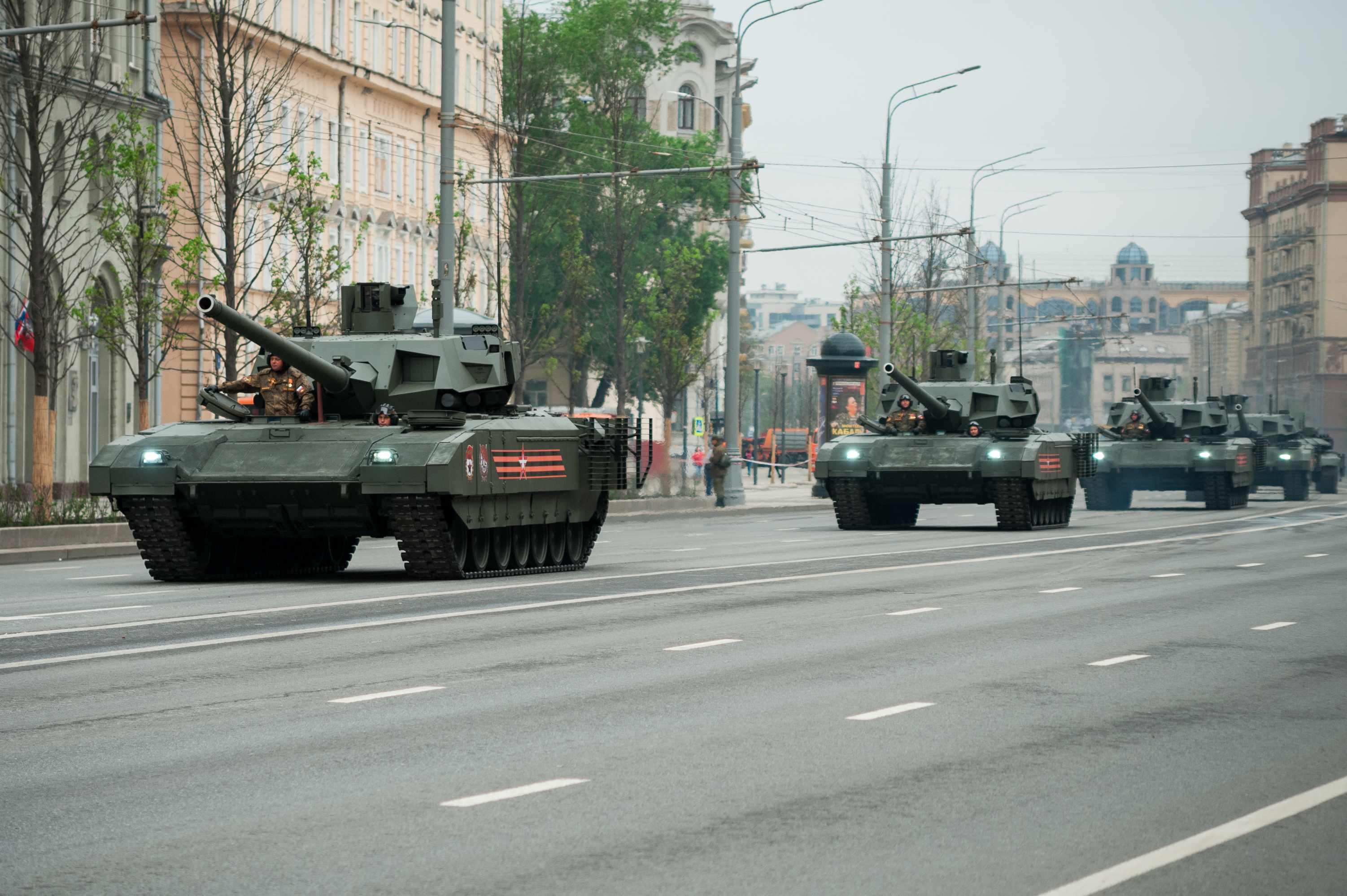
T-14 Armata tanks during 2018 Moscow Victory Day Parade in Moscow

In mid January 2020 the head of Rostec (the conglomerate owning Uralvagonzavod) said no Armata-platform vehicles including T-14 tanks had been delivered, and in February the CEO of Uralvagonzavod only said that Armata-platform armour (not necessarily T-14 tanks) would start shipping to begin operation evaluation in 2020, with the full contract of 132 Armata-platform vehicles completed by 2022. Furthermore, also in February 2020 it became evident that the set of requirements for the intended engine of the tank were not met by the construction bureau and the project of development of the engine would be closed in the first quarter of 2020, further delaying the introduction of the tank for an unspecified time. In August 2020, the Industry and Trade minister told journalists that the production of 132 Armata-platform tanks and fighting vehicles including T-14 tanks had begun after the resolution of problems with engines and thermal-imaging equipment, and they would be issued to the armed forces in 2021.

In July 2021, Minister of Industry and Trade Denis Manturov said the tank would enter serial production in 2022. However in March, Defence Minister Sergei Shoigu claimed that only "an experimental-industrial" batch of T-14s would be delivered in 2022. In August 2021, Deputy Defense Minister Alexei Krivoruchko said that the Russian Armed Forces would receive 20 T-14 Armata tanks by the end of 2021. On 23 August 2021, a Rostec official said that the company had shipped an unspecified number of T-14 tanks in an "experimental batch" to the Russian Armed Forces. In November 2021, state trials were in progress and expected to be completed in 2022, and a "pilot batch" of twenty tanks was yet to be delivered to the armed forces. On 24 December 2021, First Deputy General Director of Rostec Vladimir Artyakov announced, that "serial production" of the T-14 was launched.

On 9 December 2021 MIC First Deputy Chairman Andrei Yelchaninov said that state trials of new ammunition loader for the T-14 should be fully completed in 2022, and that "more than 40" Armata tanks will be delivered to Russian armed forces "after 2023".

On 4 March 2024, Sergey Chemezov, the CEO of Rostec, stated that the T-14 Armata had entered service with the Russian Armed Forces. However, Chemezov also stated that, because of cost concerns, it would not replace the T-90 currently in service.

=== Claims of deployment in Ukraine ===
On 25 December 2022, Russian TV presenter Vladimir Solovyov posted footage of the T-14 in combat training with other sources claiming that the tank was being prepared for battle and already deployed to the conflict zone, with a military expert saying the videos were probably shot near Kazan.

On 25 April 2023, RIA Novosti reported that an informed source claimed that the T-14 Armata has been used to fire indirectly on Ukrainian positions. It is yet to be deployed in direct assault operations. The tanks have been given extra protection and the crews have gone through "combat coordination". The tank was also absent from the Victory Day parade on 9 May for the first time. Some outside observers expressed skepticism regarding the T-14's combat readiness. On 19 July 2023, TASS quoted two unnamed defense industry sources stating that Russia's southern battlegroup had deployed T-14s in direct frontline combat in order to assess its performance, before withdrawing them from the frontline. No official information has been published yet regarding its deployment in the conflict zone. On 4 September 2023, TASS reported that the T-14 Armata has been withdrawn from Ukraine. It was deployed in an indirect fire role to test it in "real combat conditions" while being shielded from "direct assault operations". The tank was said to have received additional side protection from anti-tank ammunition.

In March 2024, Sergey Chemezov, the CEO of Rostec, stated that the T-14 would unlikely be deployed in the war in Ukraine. Chemezov attributed this decision to the vehicle's high cost, noting that the Russian military preferred utilizing the more economical T-90 tank instead.

== Design ==
The Armata was designed over the course of five years, and features a number of innovative characteristics, including an unmanned turret. The crew of three is seated in an armoured capsule in the front of the hull, which will also include a toilet for the crew.

=== Armament ===
The Vacuum-1 Armor-Piercing Fin-Stabilized Discarding Sabot (APFSDS) round, developed for the 2A82-1M gun, has a penetrator that is 900 mm long, and is said to be capable of penetrating 1000 mm of Rolled Homogeneous Armor (RHA) equivalent at a distance of 2 km. The new controlled-detonation Teknik HE-Frag shell is available and has entered service. The gun is capable of firing new guided missiles like the 9M119M1 Invar-M which has an effective range of 100 m to 5 km, and can engage low-flying air targets such as helicopters, with a new 3UBK21 Sprinter Anti-Tank Guided Missile (ATGM) with an effective range up to 12 km developed specifically for it. The 3UBK25 active homing ATGM is currently under development.

The secondary armament consists of a 12.7×108mm Kord (GRAU index 6P49) machine gun with 300 rounds (not observed during the 2015 parade) and a 7.62×54mmR Pecheneg PKP (GRAU Index: 6P41) or a PKTM (6P7К) machine gun with 1,000 rounds. All guns are remotely controlled. In addition, another 1,000 rounds can be stored separately.

The 152 mm cannon, which was first developed in 2000 for the T-95 prototype, has a high-speed APFSDS shell with a 1,980 m/s muzzle velocity, only dropping to 1,900 m/s at 2 km. However, Russian engineers have so far kept the 125 mm-size gun, assessing that improvements in ammunition are enough to increase effectiveness while concluding that a larger bore weapon would offer few practical advantages.

The T-14 could also be modified to use anti-aircraft missiles. A 30 mm anti-aircraft gun could be installed in the near future.

In August 2022, Russian media reported that the 38th Research, Development, and Testing Institute of Armoured Hardware and Armament proposed a list of new features for a prospective future T-14 design at the turn of the 2030s, which included the following:

- System of symbiosis between T-14 tank and dedicated reconnaissance drone
- 152 mm main gun
- Thermobaric ammo for 152 mm
- Supersonic armor-piercing ammo for 152 mm
- ATGM for 152 mm with aiming/guidance system "fire and forget"
- Improved target detection and identification at 6+ km
- Redesigned turret and new autoloader for accommodating 152 mm gun and ammo

=== Mobility ===
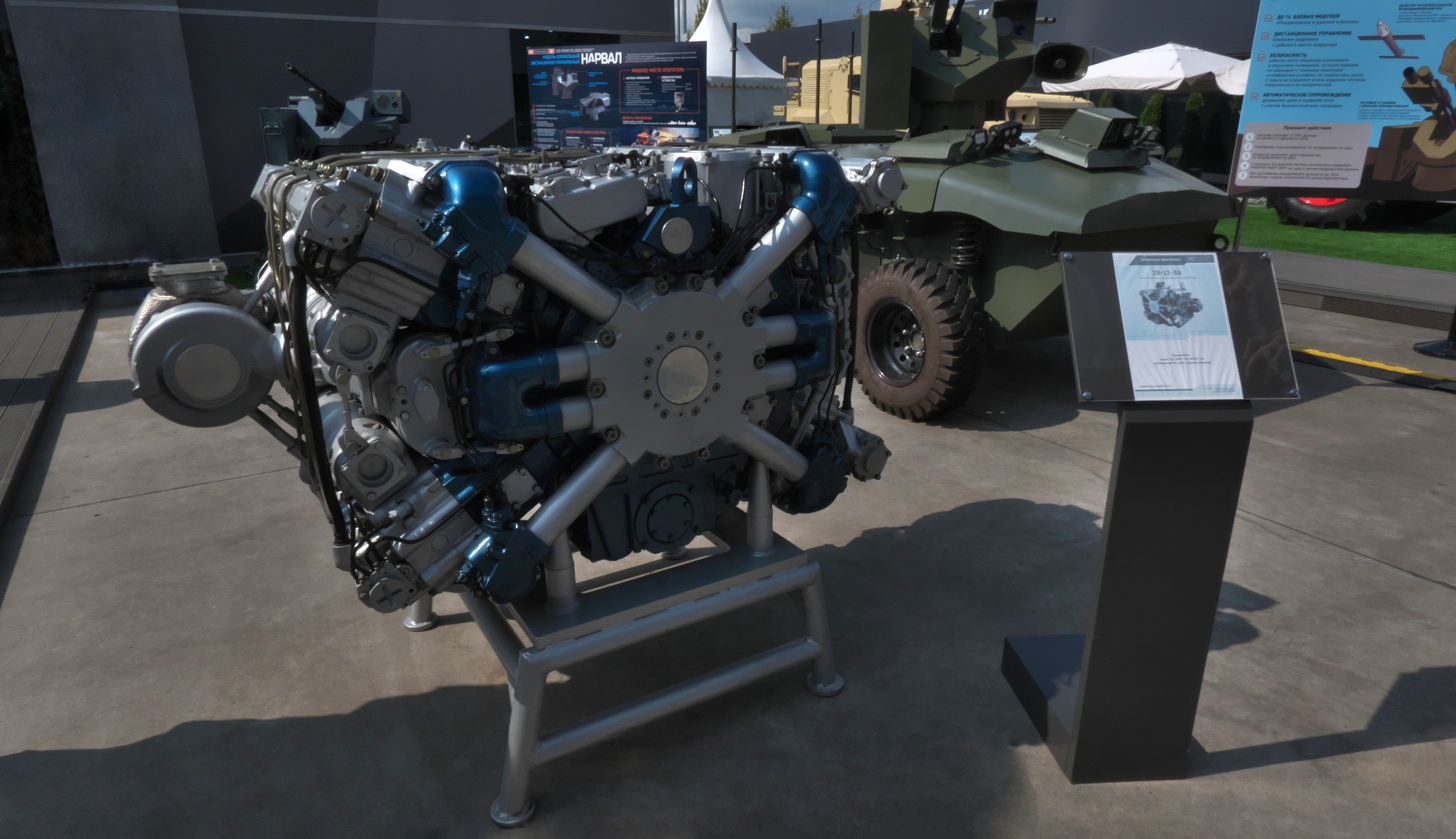
2V-12-3A engine.

During the prototype stage, several engines with power outputs ranging from 1,500 to 2,000 hp were tested on the platform, with the 1,500 hp version reportedly allowing a max speed of 82 km/h. The T-14 is powered by a ChTZ 12N360 (A-85-3A) diesel engine with a displacement of 34.6 liters delivering up to 1,100 kW (1,500 hp). The engine's theoretical maximum power, which is not normally used, is 1,500 kW (2,000 hp), at the cost of radically decreasing its service life, with a projected minimum 2,000 hours at a nominal 1,100 kW (1,500 hp), comparable to other modern tank engines, and up to 10,000 hours at a moderated 890 kW (1,200 hp). The engine is electronically controlled. Operational range is over 500 km (300 mi).

The T-14 has a 12-speed automatic gearbox, with a top speed of 80–90 km/h (50–56 mph). Sources suggest a partly or fully hydrostatic transmission.

Unlike previous Russian and Soviet designs, such as the T-90/80/72/64, the T-14 has seven 700 mm road wheels per side, based on the T-80 variant. This may have been done to improve the pivoting ability of the tank, as an active suspension system improves the target lock time by a factor of 2.2, and reduces the timeframe between target detection and reaction by 31%, all due to the resulting smoother ride.

=== Protection ===
The main protective armor is built with a new steel codenamed 44S-SV-SH, which has extremely high durability and is able to withstand extreme temperature environments. It is 15% lighter than steel used on older tanks. There is also completely new approach to composite armor with an unknown ceramic layer and utilizing Explosive Reactive Armor (ERA) within its base design, as a continuous layer (not in a form of added "bricks"). Applique armor is on the sides in forward 2/3. Slat (cage) armor is in the rear 1/3 on the sides and the back.

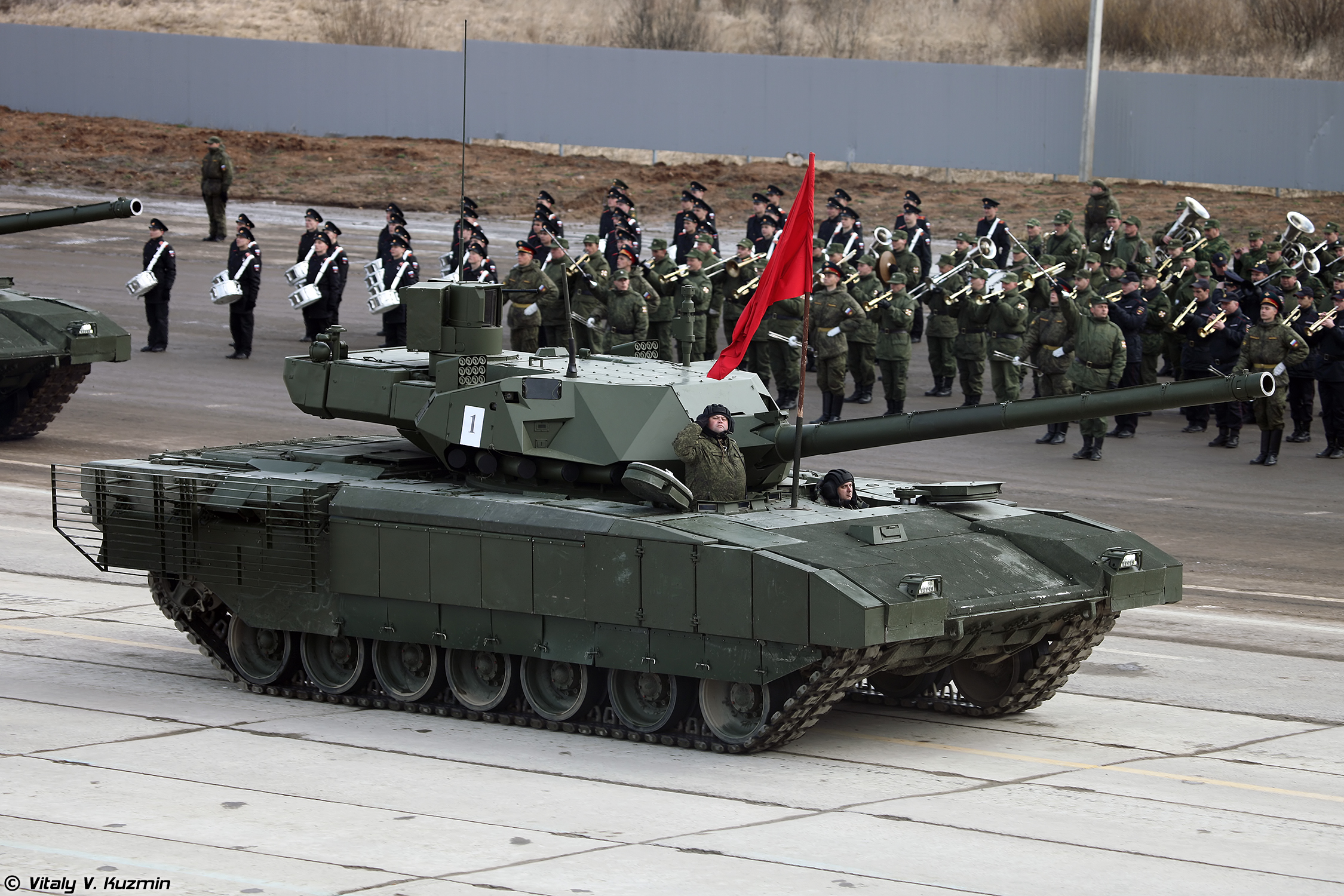
A Russian Army T-14 Armata during Victory Day parade rehearsal in Alabino, Moscow Oblast, 2016

The T-14's crew of three is protected by an internal armored capsule. Both the chassis and the turret are equipped with the Monolit (Monolith) dual-ERA system on the front, sides and the top. The tank uses an integrated, computerized control system which monitors the state and functions of all tank modules. In battle, the software can analyze threats and then either suggest or automatically take actions to eliminate them, while without the external threat it can detect and rectify crew errors. Serial production of the Armata Platform's ceramic armor components began in mid-2015.

The tank features the Afganit (Russian: Афганит) active protection system (APS). Previous Russian APS were either "hard kill" versions (Drozd, Arena) or "soft kill" version (Shtora-1). Hard-kill measures kinetically attack threatening missiles or other munitions, while soft kill measures disrupt guidance systems (laser dazzlers or infrared emitters). Afganit is about to introduce the first dual system with both soft and hard actions incorporated. It includes a millimeter-wave radar to detect, track, and intercept incoming anti-tank munitions, both kinetic energy penetrators and tandem-charges. Currently, the maximum speed of the interceptable target is 1,700 m/s (Mach 5.0), with projected future increases of up to 3,000 m/s (Mach 8.8). According to news sources, it protects the tank from all sides, however it is not geared towards shooting upwards to defend against top-attack munitions.

Defense Update released an analysis of the tank in May 2015, speculating that Afganit's main sensors are the four panels mounted on the turret's sides, which are probably AESA radar panes spread out for a 360° view, with possibly one more on top of the turret. In their opinion, the active part of the system consists of both a hard kill and soft kill element, the first of which actively destroys an incoming projectile (such as an unguided rocket or artillery shell), while the second confuses the guidance systems of ATGMs, causing them to lose target lock. They believe that it would be effective against 3rd and 4th generation ATGMs, including Hellfire, TOW, BILL, Javelin, Spike, Brimstone, and JAGM, as well as sensor-fused weapons (SFW). Some Russian sources claim the hard-kill APS is effective even against depleted uranium-cored APFSDS rounds traveling at 1.5–2 km/s (0.93–1.24 mi/s), but others are skeptical, saying the fragmentation charge would not do much to the dense penetrator; while it might be able to push it off course somewhat with a hit-to-kill approach, it likely will not do much to stop it. According to a Russian Ministry of Defence source, practical tests confirmed the destruction of the uranium subcalibre projectile (goal speed up to 2 km/s). However, several outside analysts remain skeptical, as the feat has not yet been independently verified or even publicly demonstrated.

Afganit hard-kill launchers are the long tubes mounted in groups of five between the turret's front sides and the chassis. These send out an electronically activated charge that fires an unknown type of warhead towards the target. Many analysts currently assume it is some form of high-explosive fragmentation charge, but the possibility has been raised by other sources of the usage of a more solid warhead (possibly similar to an explosively formed penetrator), as seen in Russian patent RU 2263268. The tank is also equipped with the NII Stali Upper Hemisphere Protection Complex, which consists of two steerable cartridges with 12 smaller charges each, and a turret-top VLS with two more similar cartridges, corresponding to the vehicle's soft kill APS. Additionally, using the AESA radar and anti-aircraft machine gun it is possible to destroy incoming missiles and slow-flying shells (except kinetic energy penetrators).

In July 2015, the deputy director of the Uralvagonzavod tank manufacturing company claimed the T-14 would be invisible to radar and infrared detection due to radar-absorbing paint and the placement of components with heat signatures deep within the hull. The turret's shape is designed to reduce its radio and thermal signature for a stealth ground vehicle. American and Russian armor experts have doubts about these unproven claims. A retired senior U.S. military officer said that sensitive modern thermal technology could detect things such as vehicle movement, a weapon firing, an exposed crewman, or the exhaust of an engine capable of moving a 50-ton tank regardless of heat-generating component placement. Analysts also pointed out that most stealth technology in Russia has been for aircraft to reduce their radar cross section from airborne or ground-based detection, while in a ground vehicle the approach would be to make it indistinguishable from ground clutter to optimize shielding from air-to-ground detection and the two techniques do not necessarily overlap.

In August 2020, materials of the 38th R&D and Testing Institute of Armored Hardware and Armament suggested the following protection improvements:

- increased range for APS detection and neutralization of threats
- improved all-round protection against RPGs and ATGMs
- enhanced electronics protection against electromagnetic and microwave weapons
- new system for remotely deactivating anti-tank mines

=== Sensors and communication ===
The T-14 is equipped with 26.5–40 GHz active electronically scanned array radar, which is used mainly by the APS. The T-14 uses highly protected communication channels that connect a group of T-14s and the command post.

The commander and gunner have largely identical multispectral image sights, with visible electromagnetic spectrum and thermography channels and laser rangefinders. The commander's sight is installed on the turret top and has a 360° field of view, while the gunner's, situated in the turret's niche to the gun's left, is slaved to it and is additionally equipped with a direct-vision periscopic channel and laser designator for the T-14's gun-launched, SACLOS anti-tank missiles. The detection distance of tank-sized objects for both sights is 7,500 m (8,000) in daylight, through the TV/periscopic channel, and ≈3,500 m at night through the thermal channel. There is also a backup night-vision capable sight, with 2,000/1,000 m respective detection distances. In addition to traditional vision periscopes, the driver has a forward looking infrared camera and a number of zooming closed-circuit television cameras. Video cameras are installed for all-round vision for the crew, since it lacks the normal vantage point of turret roof hatches. This 360-degree camera coverage is perhaps one of the T-14's most unusual features, made necessary because of extremely limited visibility without them. The crew, clustered in the front of the hull, would have poor situation awareness if the camera setup and video feeds were to fail.

Although the T-14 is touted as an entirely Russian-made next-generation tank, it has been speculated that some components may not be entirely domestically made. In 2015 US cybersecurity analysts Taia Global stated that information obtained from pro-Ukrainian hackers indicated that Russian industries have had difficulty producing critical components of night-vision systems for the tank, and have attempted to buy them from a French supplier in the past. It was claimed this means components of the T-14 could have originated outside of Russia, and may be more difficult to obtain or produce due to sanctions against Russia for its war against Ukraine.

This became partially subject to discussion in 2016 when the Krasnogorsk plant finished testing the Irbis-K night-vision sighting system. Completion of the Irbis-K, the first Russian-produced mercury-cadmium-telluride (MCT) matrix thermal sight, addressed a disadvantage of Russian tanks relative to their Western counterparts. The Irbis-K is capable of identifying targets at ranges up to 3,240 meters during both day and night.

== Export ==
Vladimir Kozhin, a Russian presidential aide, said in 2015 that Russia's foreign partners, including China and India, have expressed interest in purchasing new military equipment presented at the 9 May Victory Day parade in Moscow, including the Armata tank. "To a larger extent it is our traditional partners: India, China and South-East Asia," he told the Izvestia newspaper. Chinese company Norinco claims their domestic VT-4 tank is superior to the Armata design in terms of mechanical reliability, fire control, and unit cost. In August 2020 Vietnam, Egypt and Belarus were mentioned by Russian defence industry as potential customers of the T-14.

As of August 2025, Russia has reportedly offered the technology transfer of the T-14 Armata tank to India to allow its local production under the latter's Make in India programme. Uralvagonzavod, the tank's designing agency, has also offered to modify as well as design and develop an Indian variant of the Armata, in collaboration with the Combat Vehicles Research and Development Establishment (CVRDE), in order to serve the unique requirements of the Indian Army. While, the per unit cost of the base variant of the tank is reported to be between ₹30 crore (equivalent to ₹31 crore or US$3.2 million in 2026)–₹42 crore (equivalent to ₹43 crore or US$4.5 million in 2026), the potential Indian-specific variant is expected to be at least ₹10 crore (equivalent to ₹10 crore or US$1.1 million in 2026) lesser. If realised, the agreement will be on lines with India's local production of T-90 Bhishma.

== Foreign reactions ==
The T-14 Armata has been described as early as 2016 as a major concern for Western armies, and British intelligence views the unmanned turret as providing many advantages. However, at the time Western observers questioned Russia's ability to produce modern tanks like the T-90 and T-14 in significant numbers.

In response to the Armata, German company Rheinmetall has developed a new 130mm L/51 tank gun, claiming it provides a 50 percent increase in armor penetration over the 120mm L/55 in service with the Bundeswehr. Germany and France have joined forces to develop an unspecified "Main Ground Combat System" (MGCS) to compete with the technological advances of the Armata and replace both the Leclerc and Leopard 2 MBTs around 2030; however, by June 2018, deployment of the new vehicles and systems was scheduled for 2035, with full operational capability to be achieved by 2040. Additionally, Rheinmetall began the development of the KF51 Panther, which was unveiled in 2022.

== Gallery ==
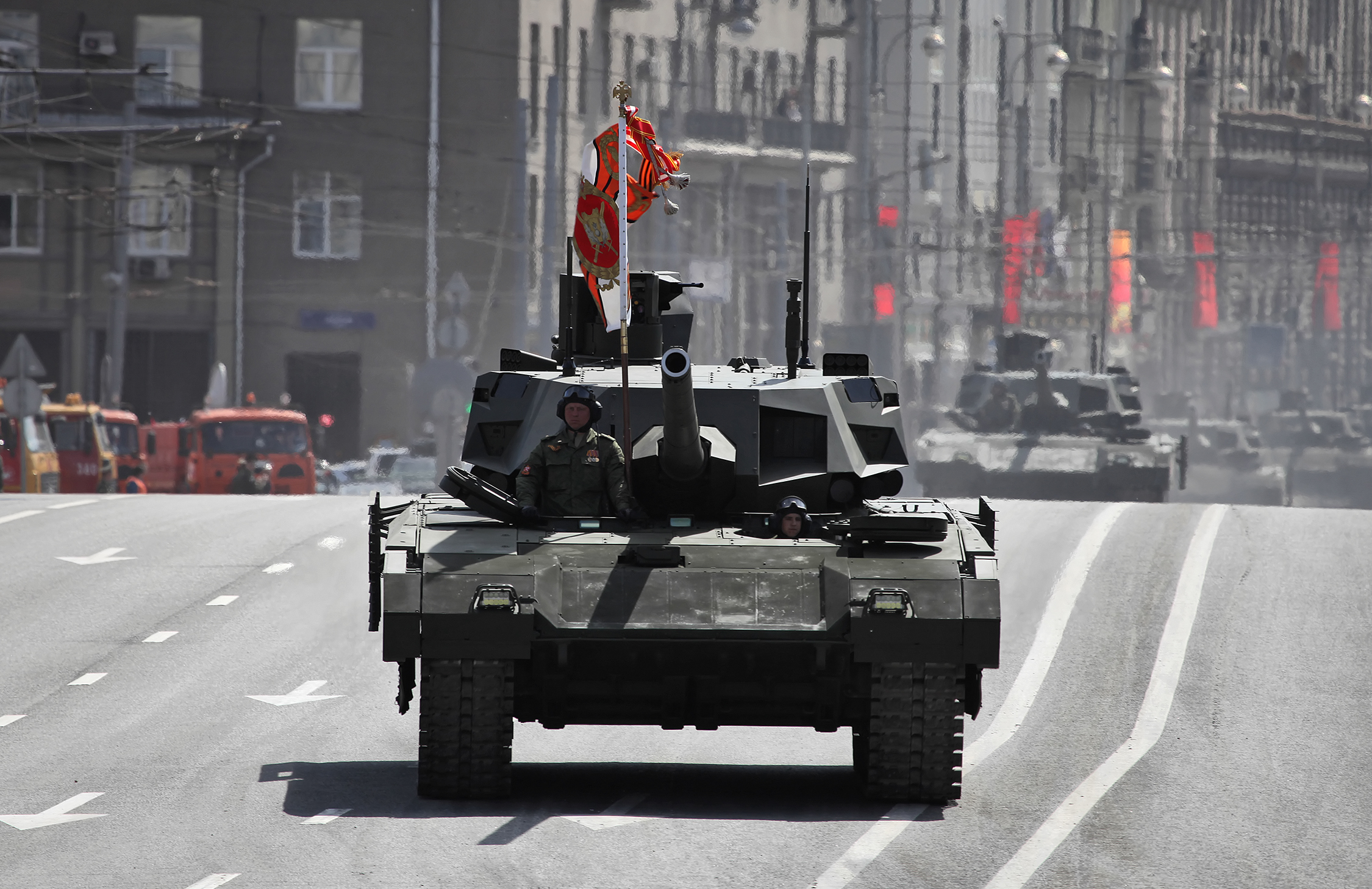
Front view

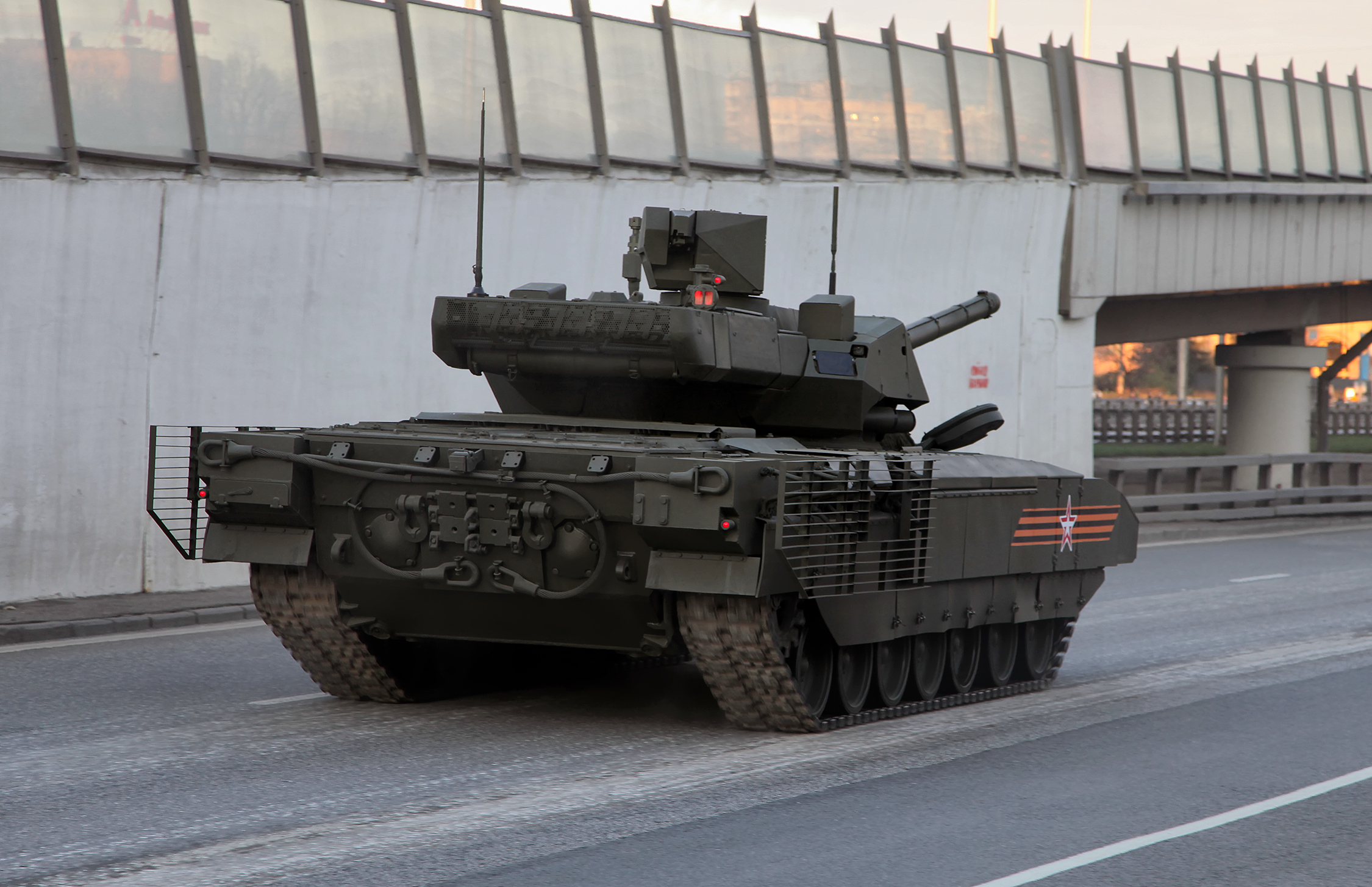
Rear and side view including the commander's hatch

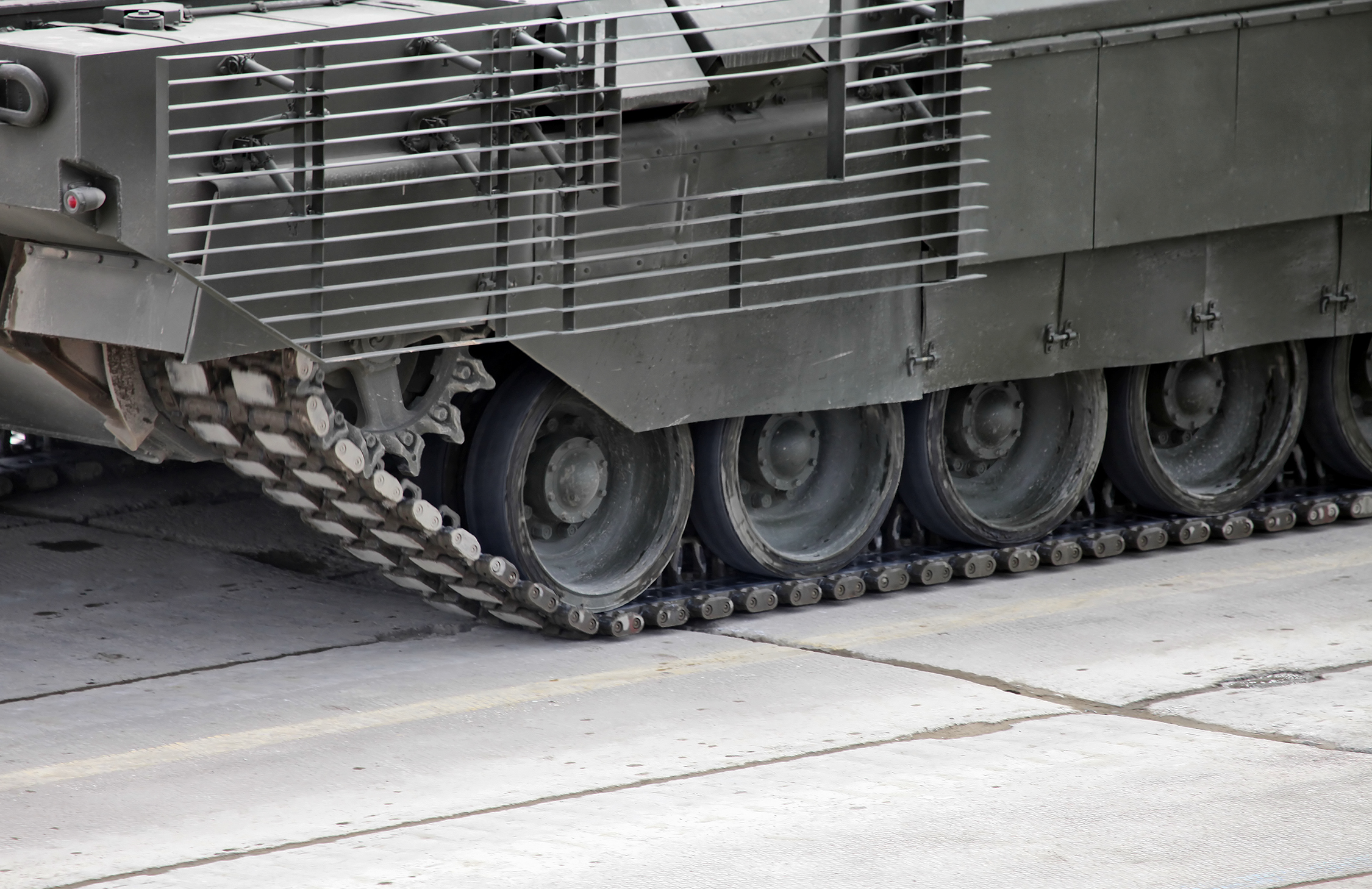
Close-up of the engine exhaust ports on the right side

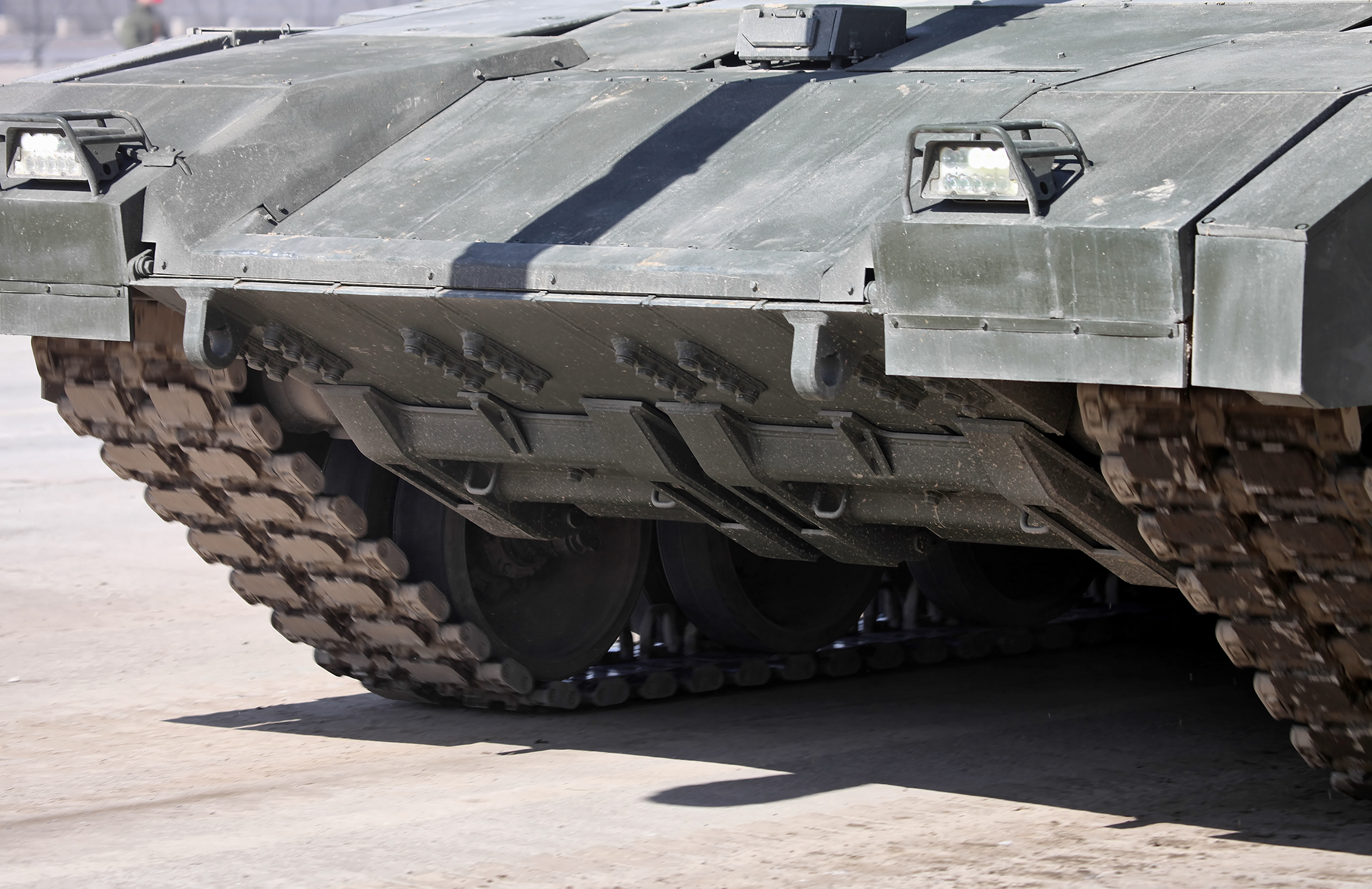
Close-up of the front, with the entrenching blade/mine countermeasures visible

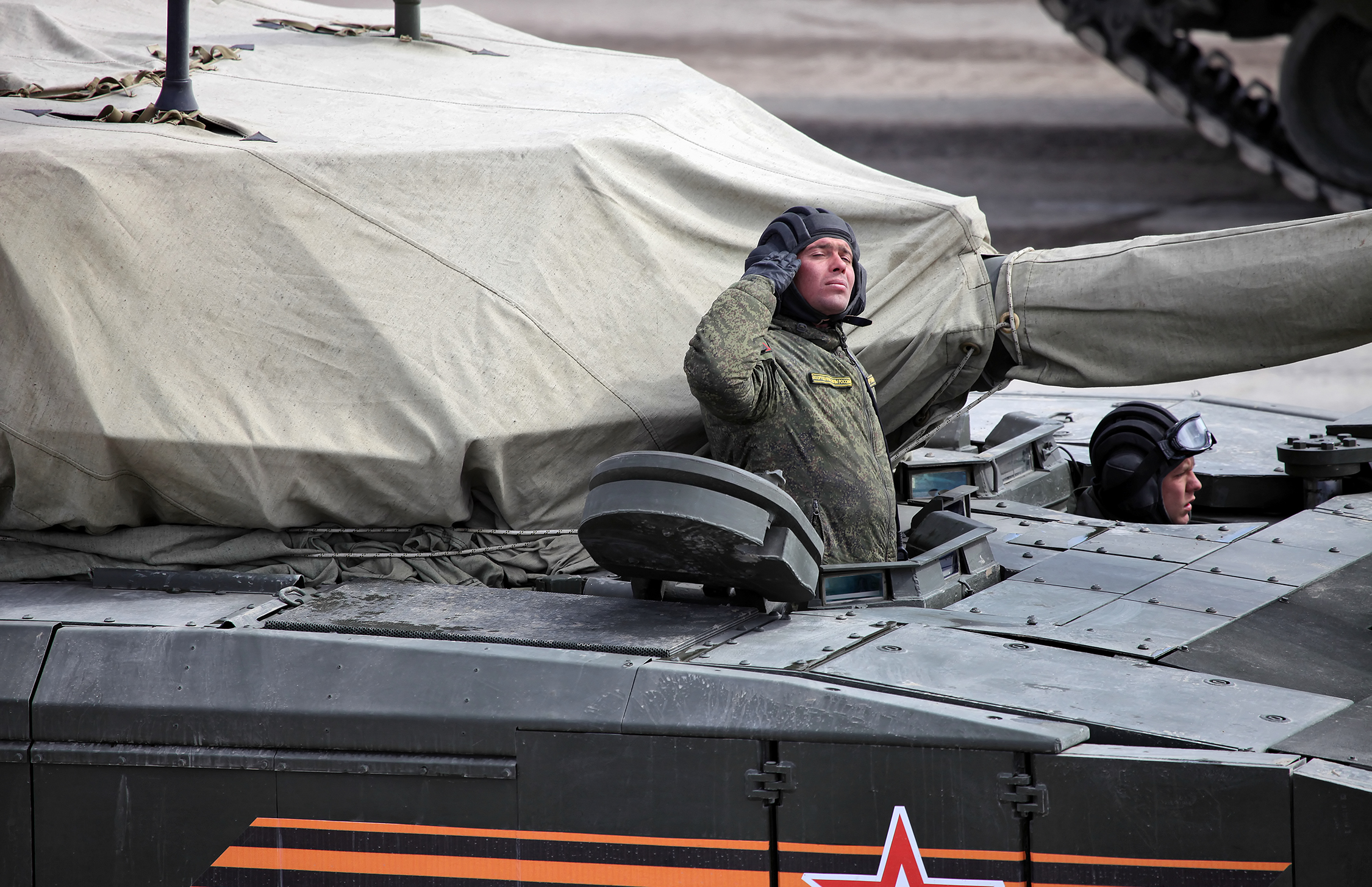
The driver has a reclining seat and a set of viewing periscopes behind his hatch for battened-down driving

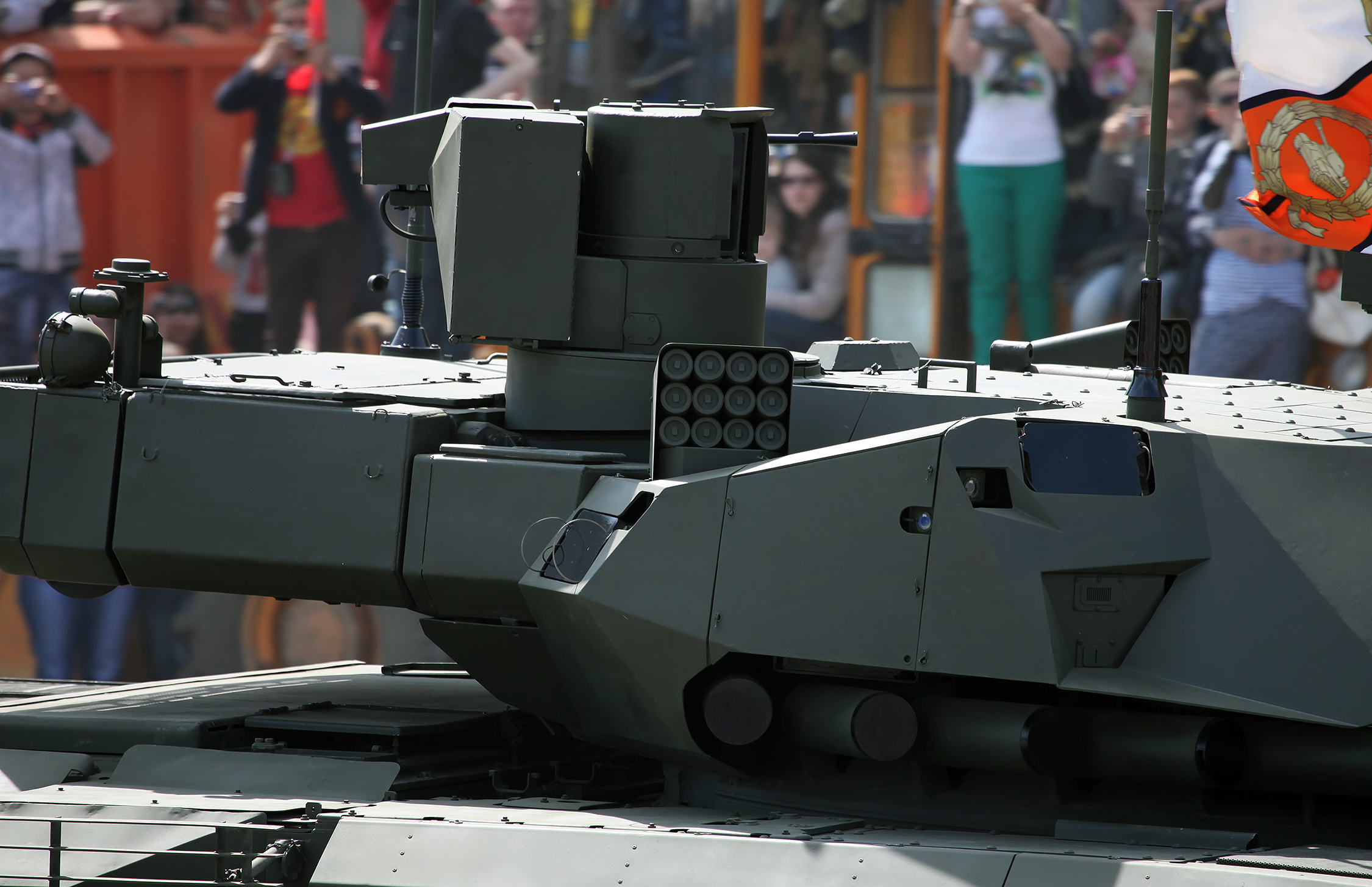
Close-up of the turret with its sensor and machine gun platform

== See also ==
- List of main battle tanks by generation
- Type 100 tank
