= Obiekt 292 =

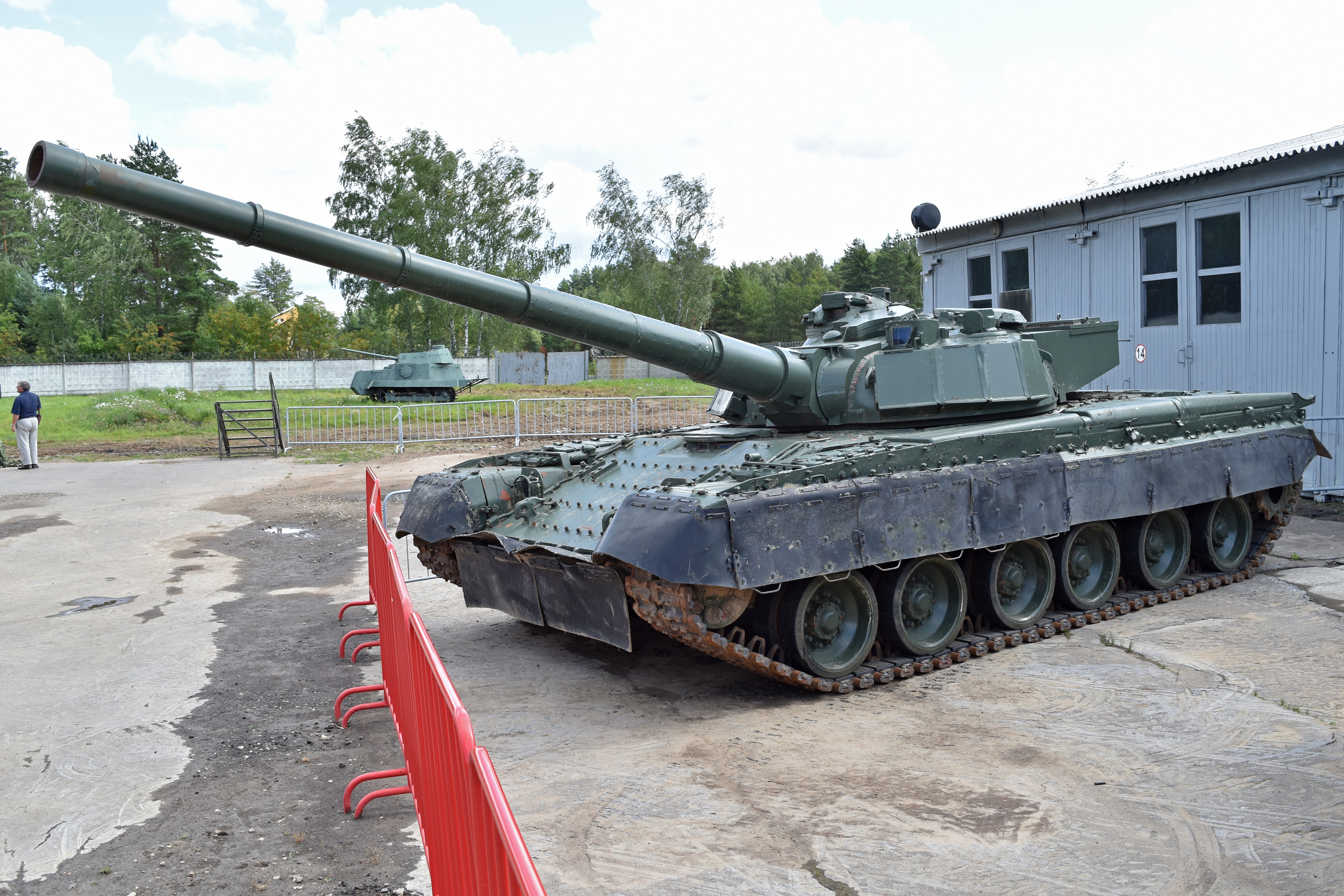
- Obiekt 292 in Kubinka Tank Museum
- Type: Main battle tank
- Place of origin: Soviet Union

Production history
- Designer: OAO Spetsmash and VNIITransmash
- Designed: 1990-1991
- Produced: September 1990
- No. built: 1

Specifications
- Mass: 46 tons
- Width: 3.525 m
- Height: 2.193 m
- Crew: 3
- Armour: rolled and cast steel and combined, protivosnaryadny
- Main armament: 152.4 mm LP-83 smoothbore tank gun (30 rounds, 6 RPM)
- Engine: GTD-1000TF turbine, 1100 hp
- Power/weight: 23.9hp/t
- Suspension: individual torsion bar
- Ground clearance: 450 mm

The Obiekt 292, or Object 292 (Объект 292), was an experimental tank of design bureau of the Kirov Plant (JSC Spetsmash) and scientists of the All-Russian Research Institute Transmash. The prototype was based on the T-80U. The chassis was that of the T-80U with a T-80BV turret that was up-gunned to a 152.4 smoothbore gun. The new gun had the same chamber diameter as the 152mm but was much longer. Anti-tank capacity was improved in such a way that the tank could potentially engage and destroy any Western tank of the time at battle distance with a single shot.

== Design ==
The tank was based on the T-80's chassis, using a new turret, and was armed with an LP-83 152.4 mm smoothbore gun. A variant of the tank utilizing a rifled 152mm armament was never completed. Like most Soviet tanks, the gun offered poor depression, and the LP-83 offered a slower reload despite the presence of an autoloader. The traverse rates of the barrel and turret were also lower than the regular T-80, thanks to the heavier gun. Despite being less versatile in battle, the firepower was superior to the T-80 and other similarly armed Soviet MBTs. In September 1990 the tank was completed and in 1991 underwent trials. The trials showed high stability and reliability of the gun and the tank itself. However, the absence of funding discontinued further work on the tank's improvement. A major benefit of this new design was that the new turret was interchangeable with the standard T-80 main battle tank turret. With the ammo rack load and rate of fire, this tank can store 30 rounds of ammunition in total, including 16 already in the autoloader, which can be fired at a rate of 6 rounds per minute.

== See also ==
- Object 785
- CATTB
- Leopard 2-140
- Object 195
