= Obiekt 785 =

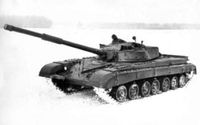
- Obiekt 785 during trials
- Type: Main battle tank
- Place of origin: Soviet Union

Production history
- Produced: late 1970s

Specifications
- Mass: 43 metric tons
- Armour: 700 mm (hull front) (steel laminate with corundum pellets); 600 mm (turret) (steel laminate with corundum pellets)
- Main armament: 125 mm 2A82 smoothbore gun 130 mm rifled gun
- Engine: 2V-16 multifuel diesel engine 735 kW
- Maximum speed: 75 km/h

The Obiekt 785, or Object 785 (Объект 785), was a Soviet experimental main battle tank built in the late 1970s. It was an improved variant of the T-80B, with seven road wheels.

The tank was testing the new generation 125 mm 2A82 smoothbore gun, carrying 50 rounds of ammunition, 30 of which in the loading mechanism. It was also testing a 130 mm rifled gun, an improved variant of the M-65 gun used on tanks like the Object 279.

== See also ==
- M1 Abrams - Component Advanced Technology Test Bed (CATTB)
- Leopard 2-140
- Pz 87-140
- Object 292
- Object 195
- Type 99KM
