= Ares Aeroespacial e Defesa =

- Type: Arms company
- Industry: Defence
- Headquarters: Israel
- Owner: Elbit Systems Ltd
- Website: ares.ind.br

Ares Aerospacial e Defensa is a Brazilian arms company which has operated since 2010 as a subsidiary company of the Israeli defense company Elbit Systems Ltd.

Ares' website states that it "concentrates its activities in the planning, design, development, manufacture, integration, maintenance and commercialization of products in three main lines of business: Stations of Arms, Naval Systems, Optical and Electro-Optical."

In 2017, Ares Aeroespacial e Defesa signed a $100 million contract to supply the Brazilian Armed Forces with remote-controlled weapon systems (RCWS). According to Defense Update, "The RCWS, named REMAX, will be supplied over a five-year period", and "will be used in armored vehicles and logistics vehicles utilized in combat for troop transport, border patrol and peace keeping missions."

Bezhalel Machlis, the president and CEO of Elbit Systems, said: "Brazil is a very important market for Elbit Systems and we are pleased to be awarded a follow-on contract for the supply of Remax to the Brazilian Army."

In 2018, Ares installed an Atena electro-optical infrared surveillance system to the Niterói-class Brazilian Navy frigate Defensora. Naval.com.br noted that the work "could lead to the installation of the system in the other frigates Niterói (F40), Constitution (F42), Liberal (F43), Independence (F44) and Union (F45)."
