= Saab Aeronáutica Montagens =

Brazilian aeronautical company

- Company type: Sociedade Anônima
- Industry: Aerospace
- Founded: 2018; 7 years ago
- Headquarters: São Bernardo do Campo, Brazil
- Owner: Saab AB (90%); Akaer (10%)
- Number of employees: 60 (2018)
- Website: saab.com

Saab Aeronáutica Montagens SA is a Brazilian aeronautical company which has operated since 2018 as a subsidiary company of the Sweden aerospace conglomerate Saab AB. The Brazilian aerospace engineering company, Akaer Engenharia SA, has a shareholding in this company.

Saab Aeronáutica Montagens is producing empennage, air brakes, the wingbox, the rear fuselage, and the forward fuselage for their mainline product: Saab JAS 39 Gripen. The manufacturer hopes that in the future this assembly line will be used to manufacture these parts for aircraft that may be sold to other countries.
