= Defense Update =

Israeli defense magazine

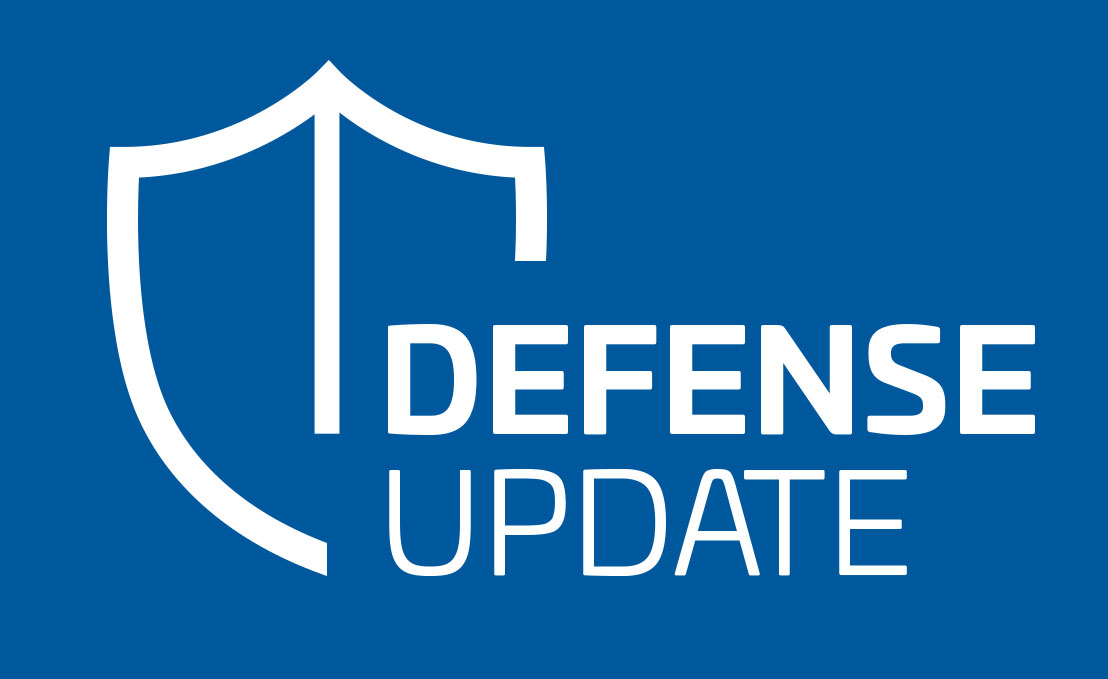
- Type: Online magazine
- Format: Online, mobile, email
- Publisher: Lance & Shield Ltd.
- Editor: Tamir Eshel
- Founded: 1978
- Language: English
- Headquarters: Kadima, Israel
- Circulation: +200,000/month
- Website: Defense Update

Defense Update is an online defense magazine published by Lance & Shield Ltd. from Israel.

== History ==
=== Print (1978-early 1990s) ===
Defense-Update was established in 1978 as a printed magazine, founded by IDF Retired LtCol. David Eshel. (דוד אשל) It was the first international defense publication published in Israel and the first privately operated defense magazine published in Israel.

Initially, it was known as Born in Battle, commemorating Israel's 30th Anniversary. It was first published in six editions, themed after the Israel Defense Forces (IDF) 30th anniversary, Israel Air Force's 30th anniversary, the Yom Kippur War, Israel's Armor Corps, Israel's infantry and special forces and the Six-Day War. Over 200,000 copies of these English titles were published as soft and hardcover books and magazines in several versions. They were also translated into German, Spanish, and French editions.

Following the launch of the book series, Born in Battle expanded its coverage to include general military topics, military history, strategy and techniques. The magazine changed its name to Defense Update International to reflect these changes.

Over the next 12 years, 99 issues of Defense-Update were published, distributed worldwide, written, edited, and managed by a small team of Israeli veterans. At the peak of its success, during the late eighties, Defense-Update was published simultaneously in four languages (English, German, French, and Hebrew).

Defense Update ceased publication in the early 1990s. Its Hebrew predecessor 'Romach' (רומח) which was founded by Eshel Dramit in 1986, continued publication for several years.

=== Defense Review International (till 1997) ===
Defense-Update's publisher, Lance & Shield, embarked on a new concept, supporting Israel's defense export activities with a dedicated magazine highlighting Israel's defense technology programs. The magazine called Defense Review International was published periodically to support major airshows and defense exhibitions. The editor was Tamir Eshel, (תמיר אשל) David's son and the assistant editor in charge of the production of Defense Update publications.

By 1994, Defense Review International had transformed from a print publication into a CD-ROM-based directory-style publication, employing a groundbreaking hyperlink editing technology developed by Israel's hypertext pioneer Enigma. The new digital and interactive defense directory became an online publication a year later.

Lacking local industry understanding and acceptance of the new initiative, the publication could not muster enough support to sustain the directory publication. Moreover, the host service provider went bust, practically erasing the young website from the web around 1997.

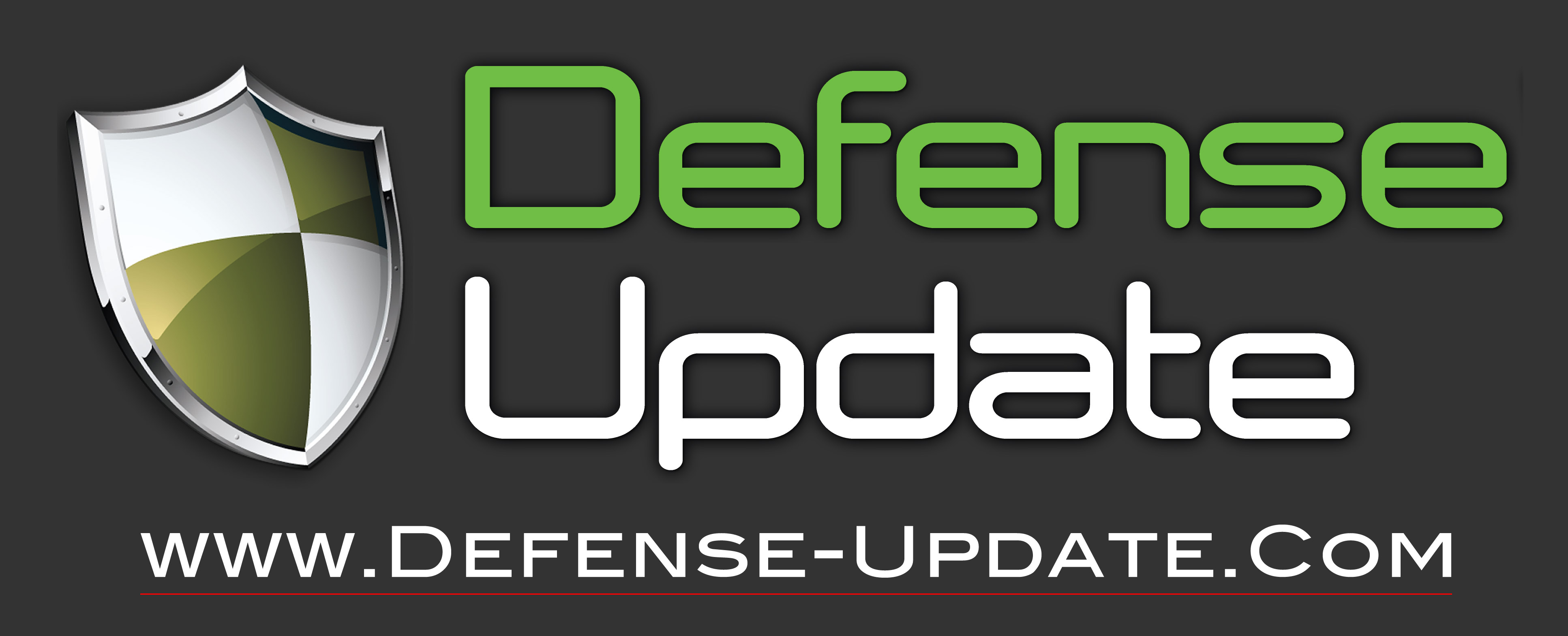

=== Online Defense Update (2010-2022) ===
Five years later, Defense-Update returned - now focusing on advanced defense technology, with a special focus on Israel's defense topics. By 2002 Defense-Update published the first edition, which was irregularly updated until January 2004, when the new online venture once more assumed the brand and tradition of the former magazine. In 2009, Noam Eshel (נועם אשל) joined the editorial team as a photographer and news editor. As assistant editor for technology, Noam was responsible for several phases of upgrading the pioneer defense-update into a modern website.

As of November 2024, it serves about 70,000 unique monthly users and reaches nearly a million readers annually. Defense-Update covers worldwide defense news topics, highlighting strategy, defense technology, and military affairs related to Israel, Israel's defense industries, global war on terror, and global military power.

== Coverage ==
Defense Update coverage spans land, air, naval, C4ISR, intelligence, and network-centric warfare, infantry warfighting tactics and techniques, homeland defense etc. Defense-Update covers Armoured Fighting Vehicles (AFV), Aerospace - and unmanned systems, as well as robotics and Precision Strike weapons. Analysis of trends in Command, Control, Communications and Computing, Intelligence, Surveillance, and Reconnaissance (C4ISR) is included.

The site focuses on trends such as hybrid and asymmetric warfare, network-centric operations, force protection and homeland security. Defense-Update and its authors are referenced by defense establishments and publications, including the British Ministry of Defense, U.S. Army

The site maintains a defense forum on LinkedIn and an interest group on Facebook, distributes instant updates on Twitter, and supports media channels on Flickr and YouTube, featuring photos and videos. It is designed to enable the effective use of mobile phones.
