= T-95 =

Planned Russian main battle tank

Object 195 / T-95
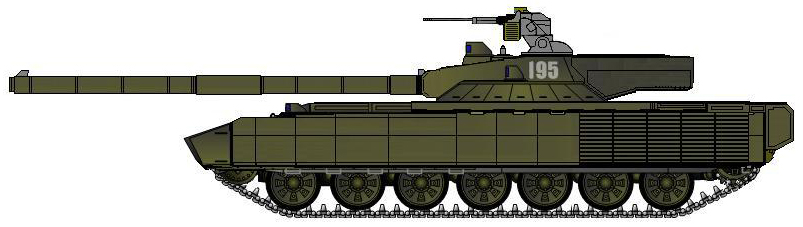
- Representation of the tank
- Type: Main battle tank
- Place of origin: Soviet Union / Russia

Production history
- Manufacturer: Uralvagonzavod
- Produced: 1988-2007(est.)
- No. built: 1 prototype

Specifications
- Mass: 58-60 t
- Length: 7950 mm
- Width: 3770 mm
- Height: 3420 mm
- Crew: 3
- Armor: Combinated, Welded, Rolled steel Reactive armor : Kontakt-5
- Main armament: 152 mm 2A83 smoothbore gun
- Secondary armament: 30 mm Shipunov 2A42
- Engine: 12N360 X-shaped double turbocharger diesel engine A-85-3A, 1,500 hp (1,100 kW)
- Power/weight: 25-26 power / weight, hp/t
- Suspension: Active hydropneumatics suspension
- Operational range: >500 km
- Maximum speed: 75 km/h

T-95 is the common informal designation of the Russian third-generation main battle tank internally designated as the Object 195, that was under development at Uralvagonzavod from 1988 until its cancelation in 2010. Little about the tank is publicly known. The work from Object 195 was used in Object 148, later type-classified as the T-14 Armata.

== History ==
Around 1988, Nizhni Tagil was ordered to work on a new main battle tank. Requirements were developed from the Sovershenstvovanie-88 (Improvement-88) study. The chassis derives from Object 187, but is longer.

The project was first reported in 1995 It was due to be introduced in 2009, but was repeatedly delayed.

T-95 was a name given to the tank by media; it was not an official name.

Work on Object 195 was curtailed by lack of funding until 2000–2001. The prototype tank was announced by the Russian Minister of Defense Igor Sergeyev in 2000. In July 2008, the Russian government announced that the Russian armed forces would start receiving new-generation tanks superior to the T-90 after 2010. The head of the Federal Service for Defence Contracts, Sergei Mayev, said the T-90 would remain the "backbone" of Russian armor until 2025, and that T-72s and T-80s would not be modernized, but instead be phased out by "new-generation tanks" entering service after 2010.

Object 195 was canceled in April 2010. The reasons for its cancellation have not been made public as of 2018. The Russian government terminated its involvement in the project in May 2010 and withdrew all funding.

In May 2010, deputy defense minister and chief of armaments Vladimir Popovkin announced that a number of programs for development of new armor and artillery weapons would be cancelled. The main victim was the Object 195 program. Popovkin said the military would focus on modernization of the T-90 instead. The reason given for this was that the T-95 was already obsolete, as it had been in development for almost two decades, but some sources speculated it had more to do with the recent reduction in Russia's military budget, requiring substantial cuts across the board.

Popovkin confirmed this decision in a June 2010 interview, stating that Russia would no longer fund and was not going to buy the T-95, but that Uralvagonzavod might continue to work on the tank without government support. In early July 2010, as reported by "Ural Information Bureau", the Minister of Industry and Science of the Sverdlovsk region, Alexander Petrov, said that Uralvagonzavod would soon finalize a T-95 prototype, entirely independently. However, without state funding or export permits, the company would be unable to proceed to production.

In July 2010 at the Russian Defence Expo in Nizhny Tagil, the Director of the Federal Service for Military-Technical Cooperation of the Russian Federation, Konstantin Biryulin, announced that the Russian state monopoly Federal Service for Defense Contracts was unveiling the prototype of Object 195 in a private showing to selected VIP guests, though the tank was never shown to journalists or confirmed publicly by any of the participants.

== Design ==
Most information about this tank was speculative. Other than its outside dimensions, the design was presumably a significant departure from the Soviet-era tanks then in service. It was expected to have a new hydropneumatic suspension with adaptive features, and the entire crew was going to be placed in a sealed compartment inside the hull, isolated from other tank components. The T-95 was armed with a 152 mm 2A83 main gun.

== See also ==
- Black Eagle (tank), Russian deep modernization of the T-80
- T-14
- T-90
