= Ural Typhoon =

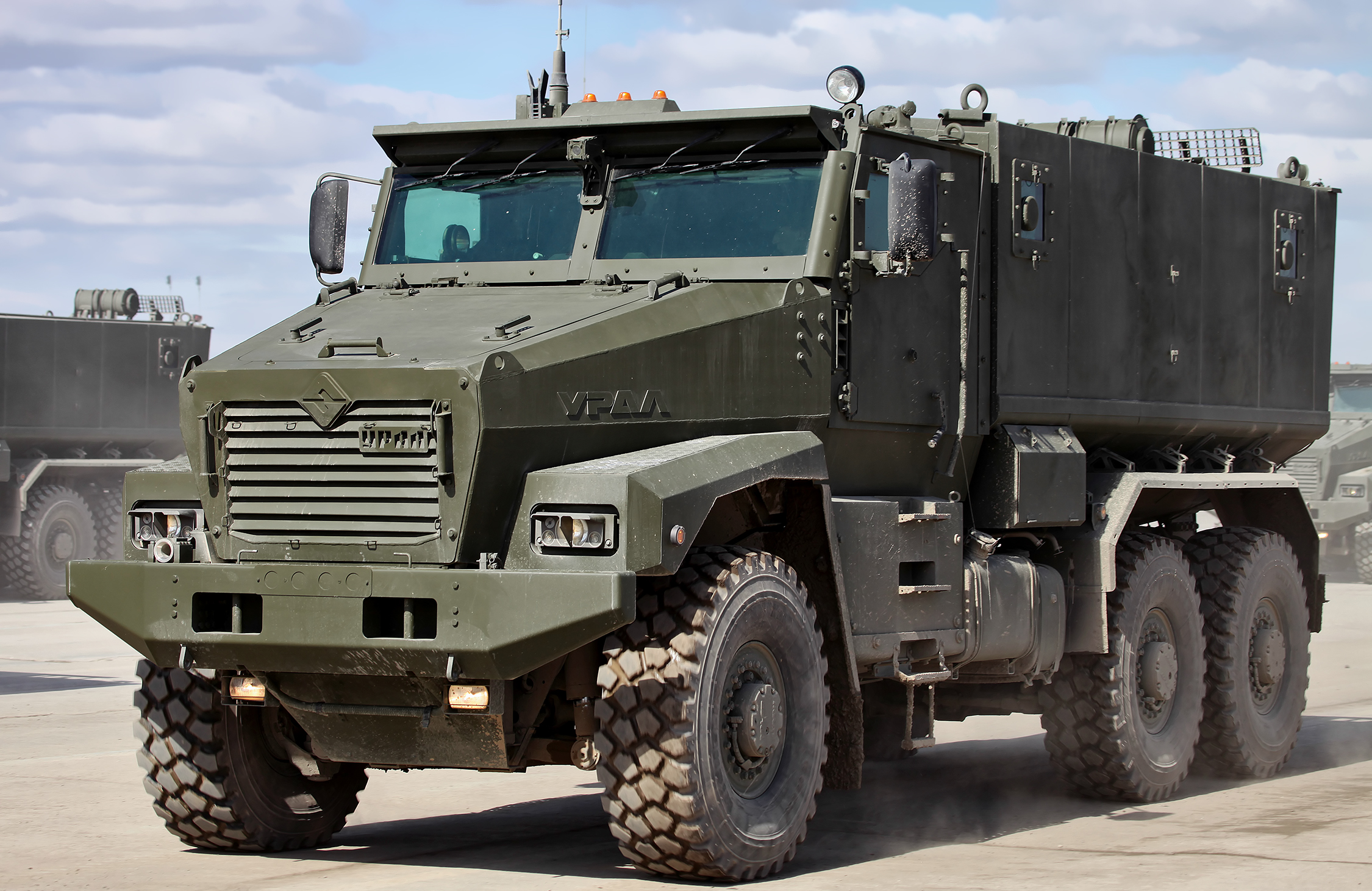
- Ural-63095 Typhoon MRAP
- Type: Mine-Resistant Ambush Protected Vehicle
- Place of origin: Russian Federation

Service history
- In service: 2014-present
- Used by: Russian Armed Forces

Production history
- Designer: Military Industrial Company
- Designed: 2010
- Manufacturer: Ural Automotive Plant
- Produced: 2014-present
- No. built: 180

Specifications
- Mass: 24 tons
- Length: 9.5m
- Width: 2.60m
- Height: 3.50m
- Crew: 3+16
- Engine: YaMZ-5367 turbodiesel 450 hp
- Transmission: automatic
- Suspension: 6×6 wheeled
- Operational range: 1120 mi (1800 km)
- Maximum speed: 65mph (105 km/h)

Ural Typhoon is Russia's multi-functional, modular, Mine-Resistant Ambush Protected Vehicle family. The chassis consists of the car bonnet, frame, three-axle drive, bonneted frame and chassis. The Typhoon is part of Russia's large vehicle Typhoon program.

== Versions ==
Can be used as reconnaissance, command and staff vehicles, machinery EW / RTR or communications, ambulance or to conduct engineering, radiation, chemical and biological reconnaissance of transportation.

== Features ==
Two variants have been identified thus far:

=== Ural-63095 ===
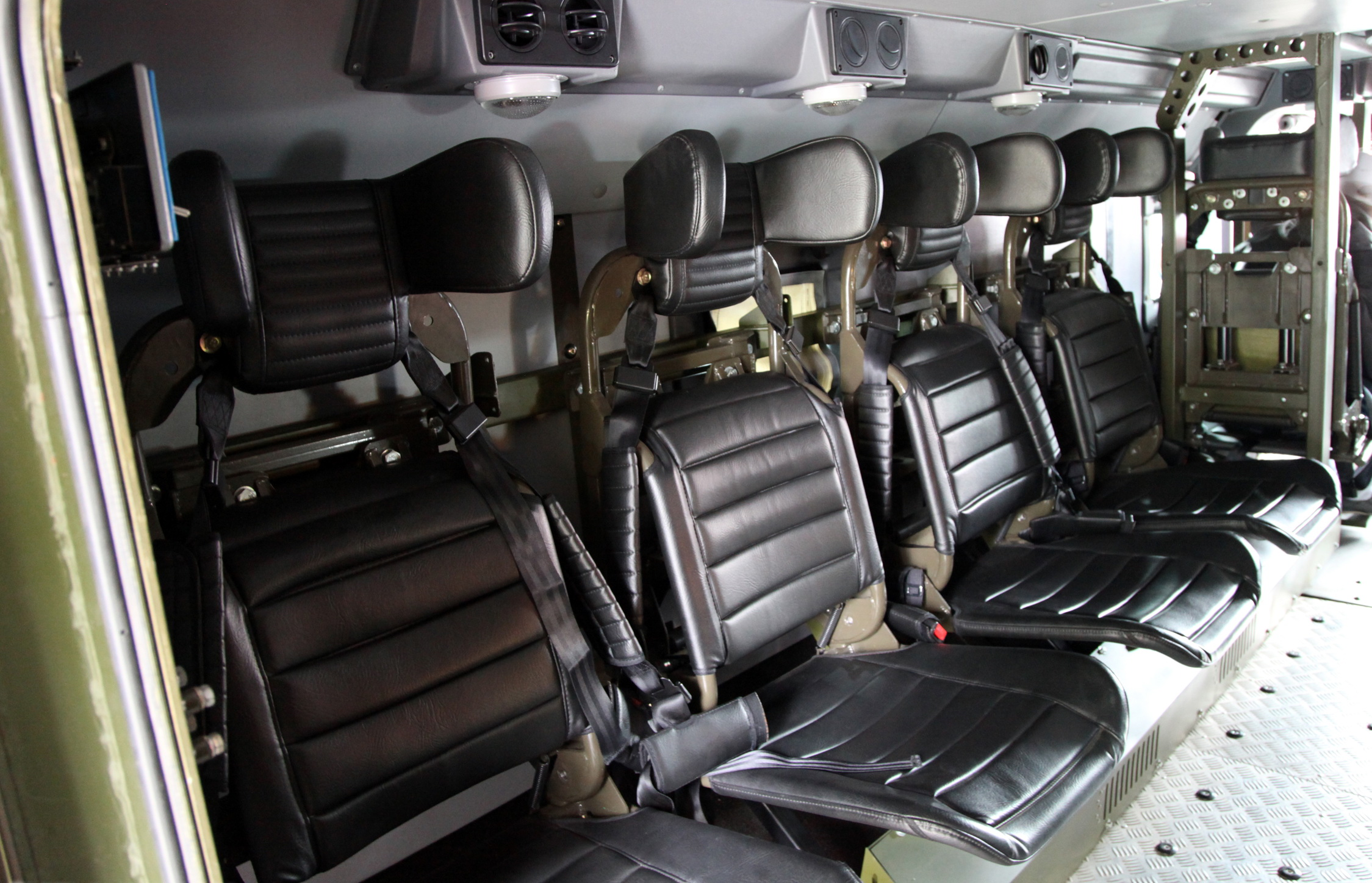
Ural Typhoon passenger compartment

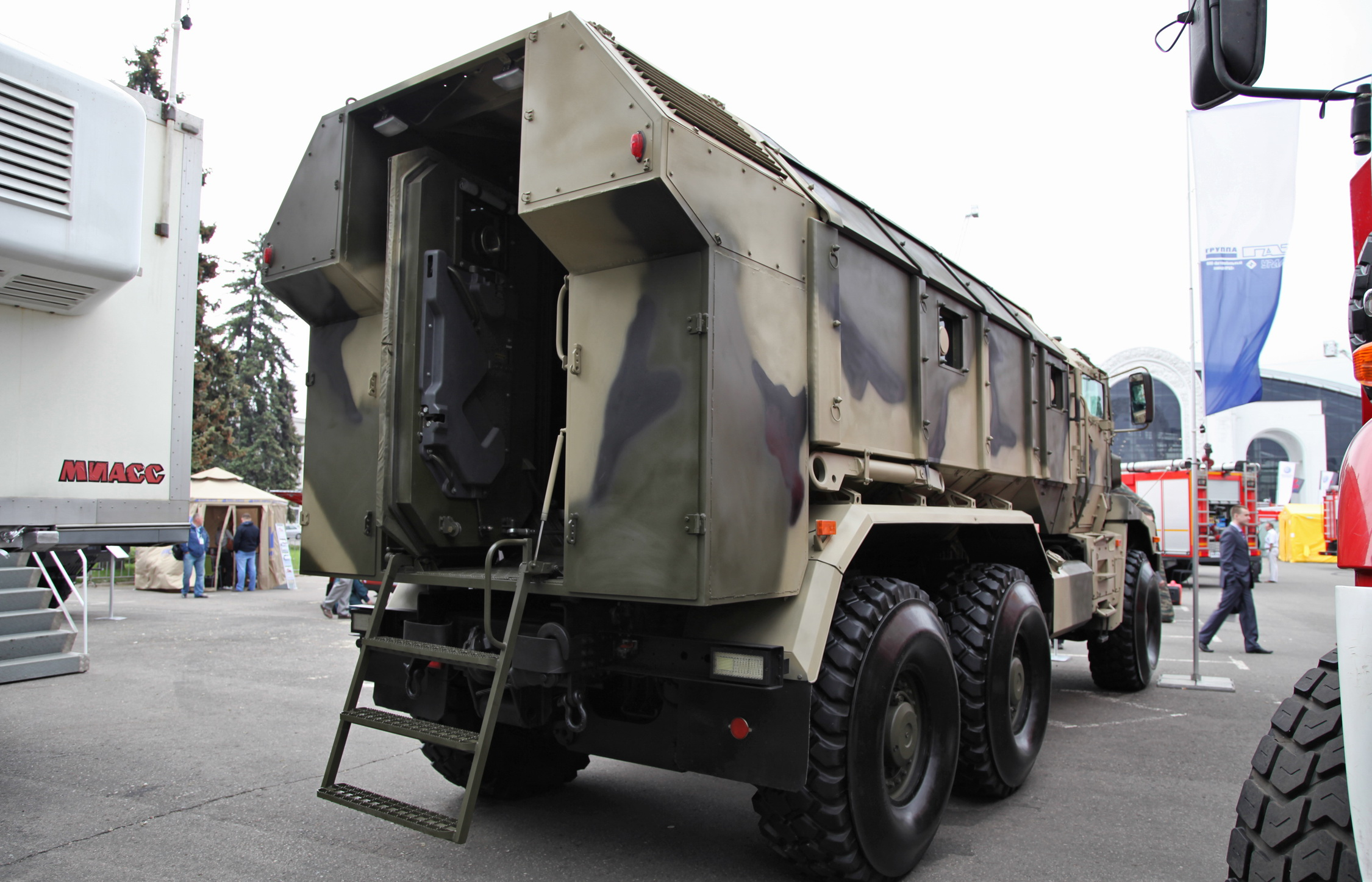
Ural Typhoon rear module

- Total weight: 24 tons
- Crew: 3 + 16 in module
- Configuration: 6 × 6
- Power: YaMZ-5367 450 hp turbodiesel
- Transmission: six-speed automatic transmission
- Transfer case: mechanical two-stage
- Tyres: bullet-proof with automatic sealing
- Armor type: Laminated glass and composite (steel and ceramic)
- Protection class: proof from 14.5 mm armor-piercing bullets, up to 8 kg of explosives underneath
- Armament: remote-controlled unit mounting a 7.62 mm HMG or 14.5 mm KPV HMG, loopholes

=== Ural-63099 ===
- Crew: 3 + 12

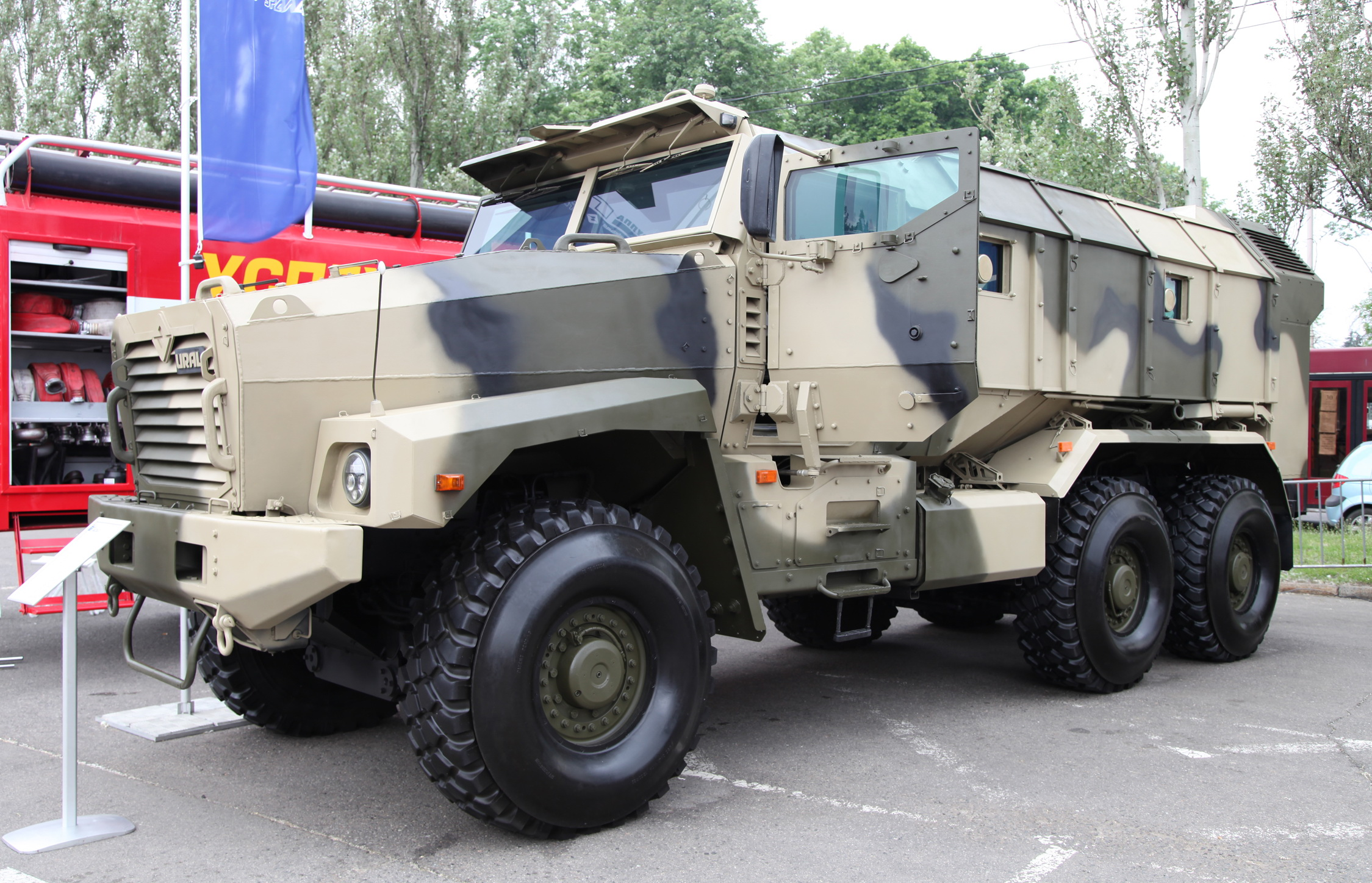
Ural-63099 Typhoon MRAP

== Operators ==
=== Current operators ===
- Russia

== See also ==
- Kamaz Typhoon
- ZIL Karatel
