= Kamaz Typhoon =

Russian armored vehicle family

KamAZ-63968 Typhoon-K
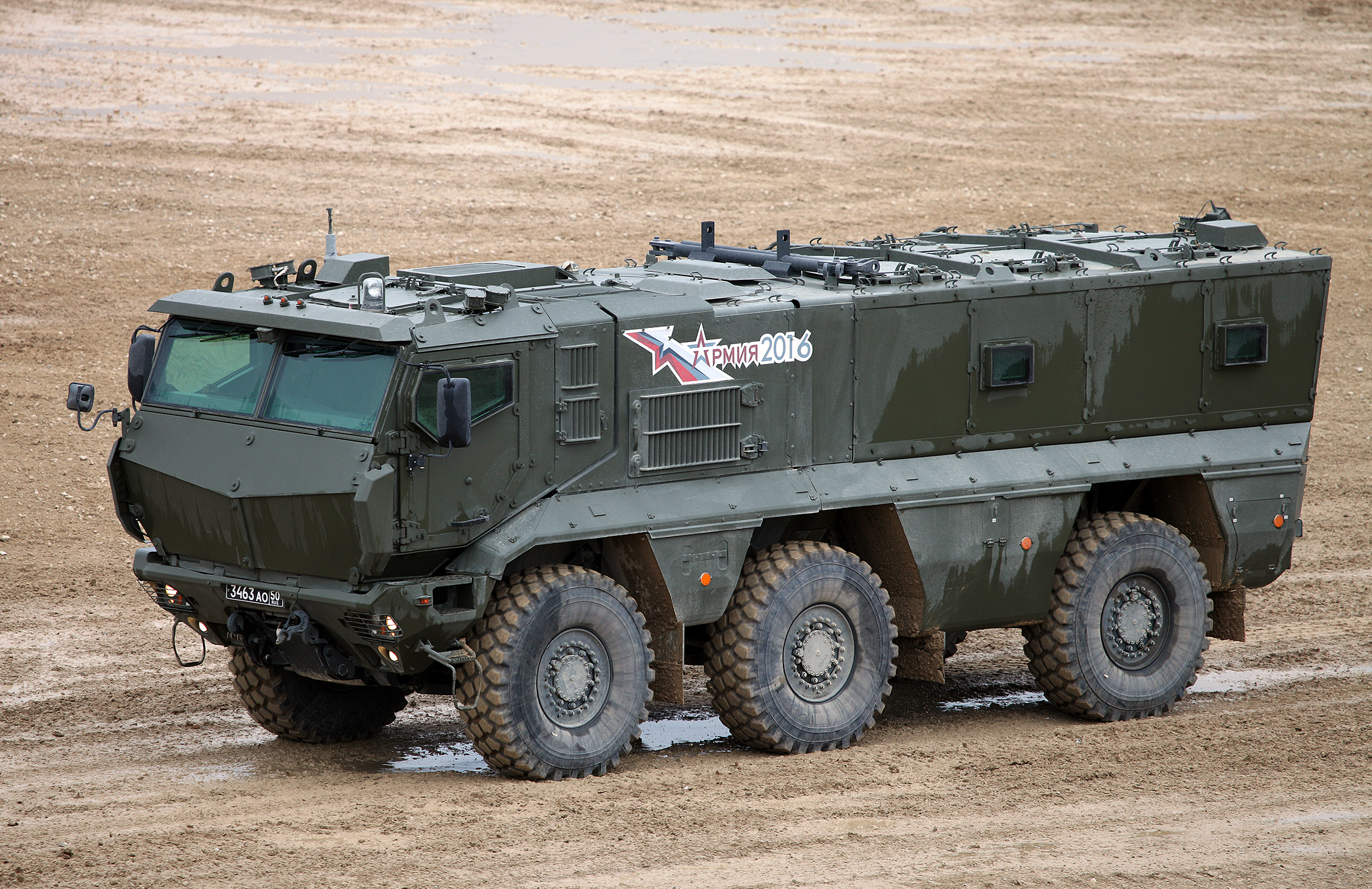
- KamAZ-63968 Typhoon-K MRAP vehicle
- Type: Mine-resistant ambush protected vehicle
- Place of origin: Russia

Service history
- In service: 2014
- Wars: Russo-Ukrainian War

Production history
- Designer: KAMAZ
- Designed: 2010
- Manufacturer: KAMAZ
- Produced: 2014
- No. built: 328
- Variants: KamAZ-63969

Specifications
- Mass: 21 t
- Length: 8.99 m
- Width: 2.45m
- Height: 3.32m
- Crew: 2+16
- Engine: ЯМЗ-5367 I6; 450 HP
- Transmission: YaMZ 8 gears automatic
- Suspension: 6×6 wheeled
- Ground clearance: 185 to 575 mm
- Operational range: 1,200 km (750 mi)
- Maximum speed: 105 km/h (65 mph)

KamAZ Typhoon (Russian: КамАЗ-63968 Тайфун) is a family of Russian multi-functional, modular, armored mine-resistant ambush protected vehicles manufactured by the Russian truck builder KAMAZ. The Typhoon family is part of Russia's Typhoon program. As of 2021, the number of Typhoons in the Russian Armed Forces fleet was about 330 units of Typhoon-K.

== History ==
The development of the "Typhoon" vehicle family began in 2010, when Minister of Russian Federation Armed Forces approved the "Development of Russian Federation Armed Forces military vehicles for the period until 2020" program and started the Typhoon MRAP program. In 2012 the first contract between Russian Ministry of Armed Forces and KAMAZ to buy Typhoons was signed.

12 Typhoons took part in Russian Victory Day military parade in 2014. State tests were completed in 2019.

The KamAZ Typhoon has been used by the Russians in the Russo-Ukrainian War with at least 28 KamAZ-63968 Typhoon and 11 K-53949 Typhoon-K being destroyed, damaged, abandoned and captured as of 12 February 2025.

An import-substituted Typhoon-K vehicle was offered for export in April 2023.

== Description ==
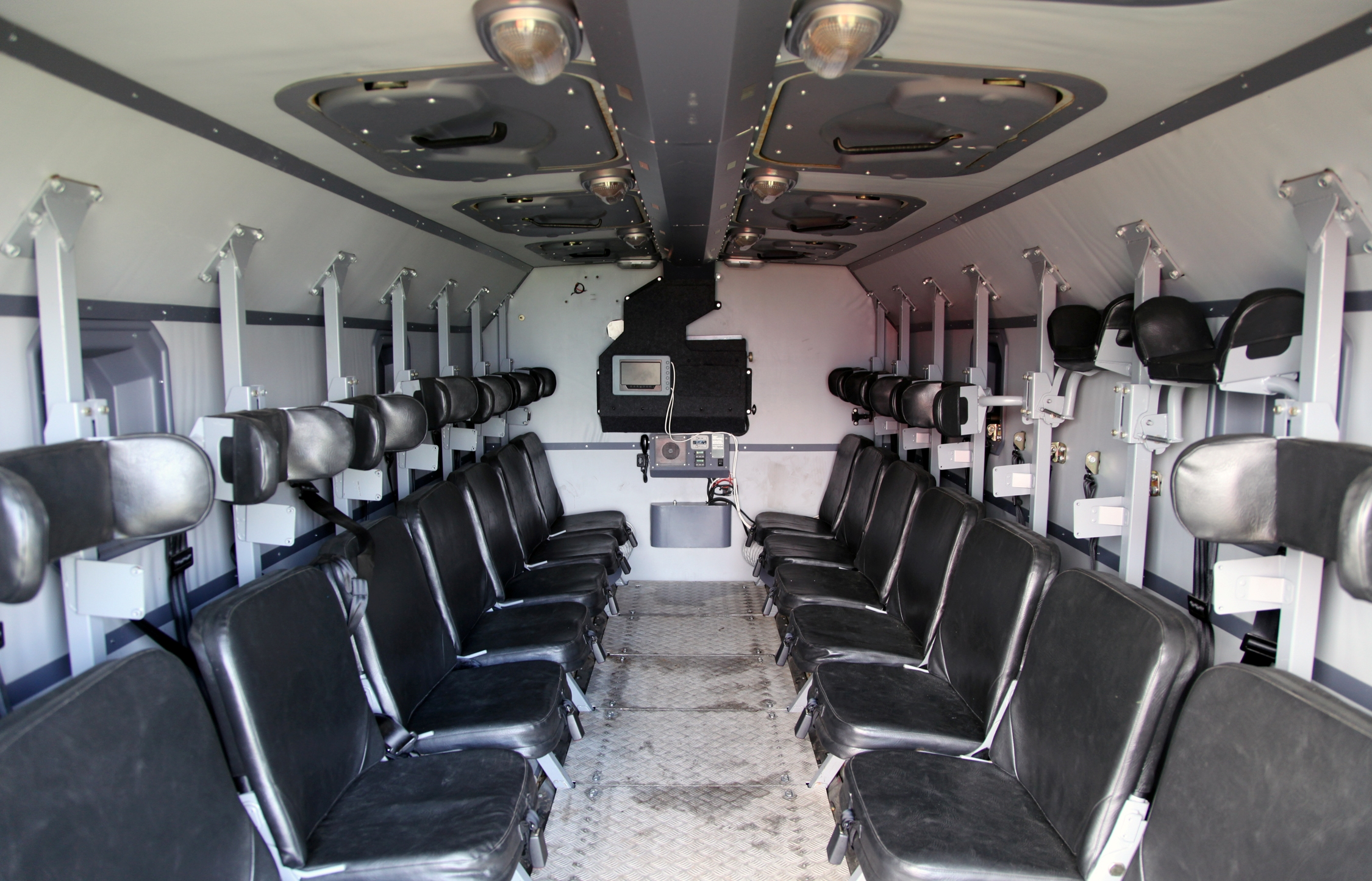
KamAZ Typhoon interior

Russia claims NATO STANAG 4569 level 3b protection. Combined set of ceramics and steel armor, which protects against armor-piercing bullets of caliber 14.5 × 114 mm. Includes 128.5-129.0 mm thick bulletproof glass with a transparency of 70%, developed by the "Magistral Ltd" and tested at the Research Institute of Steel, withstanding 2 shots spaced at 280–300 mm in the shelling of KPVT with speed of bullet 911 m / s at the instant of contact with the glass. Bulletproof exceed the highest demands on available GOST (GOST R 51136 and GOST R 50963), in which the highest level - a fire of armor-piercing bullets B-32, 7.62 × 54 mm from the SVD. During the production, Magistral LTD focused on western standards level IV STANAG 4569 - guaranteed protection in the shelling of armor-piercing ammunition B-32, 14.5 × 114 mm from a distance of 200 m with a bullet velocity 891–931 m / s. Reservations withstand hit of 30-mm ammunition. There are bullet-proof tires 16.00R20 with explosion inserts diverting the blast wave, with automatic pumping of air and controlled pressure to 4.5 atmospheres. Provided loopholes for firing from small arms, remotely controlled machine gun. Unification with other family cars is 86%.

Seats are equipped with personal weapons holders, seat belts and head restraints. They are attached to the roof module, to reduce the impact of mines / bombs. Inside the module is installed set for filtering FVUA-100A and air conditioning. On the roof there are escape hatches in case the vehicle rolls over. Passengers exit through the ramp at the stern of the vehicle or through a side door.

== Surveillance and communication ==
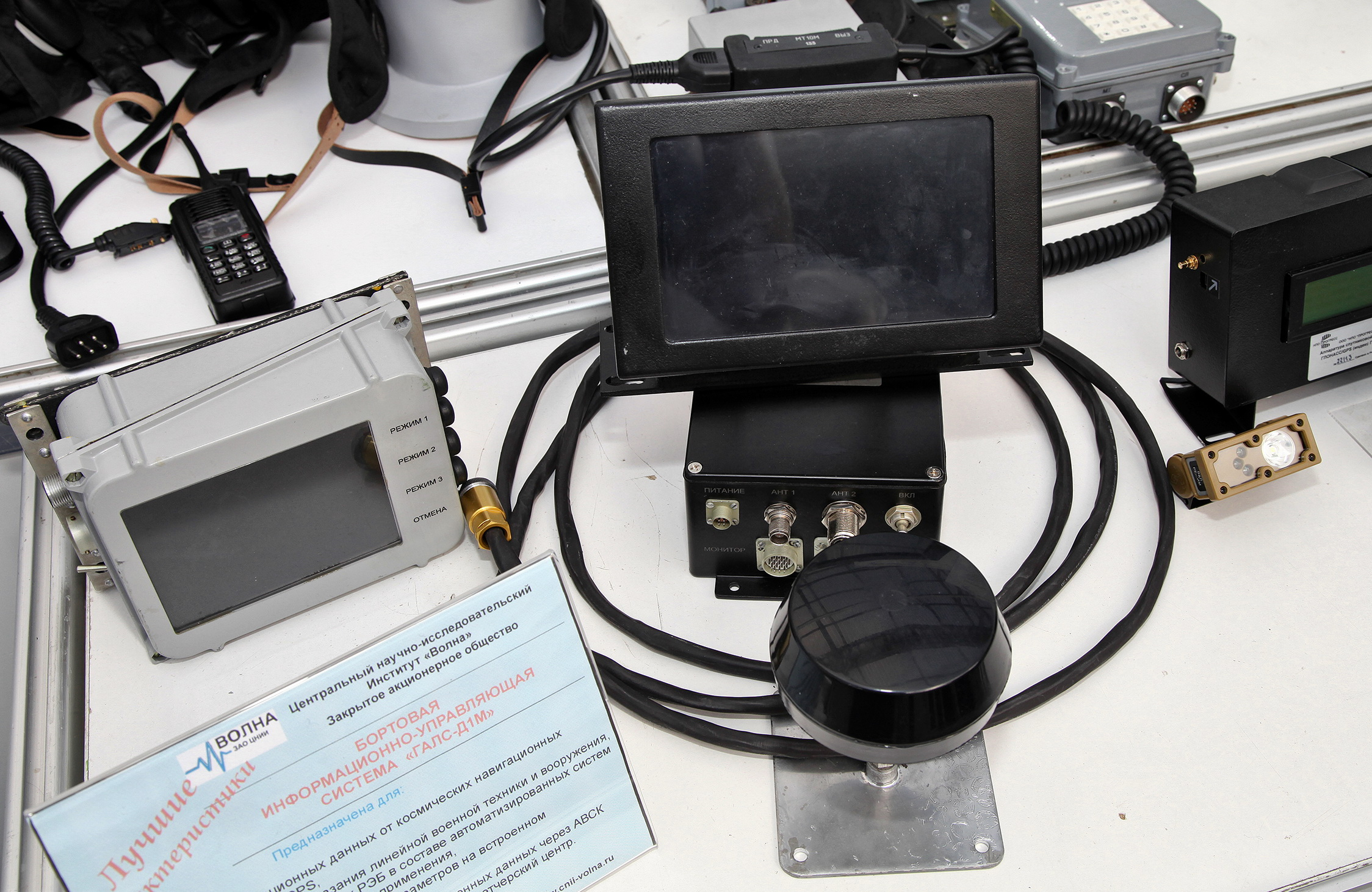
ГАЛС-Д1М (GALS-D1M) on-board information and control system as installed in Typhoon armored vehicles

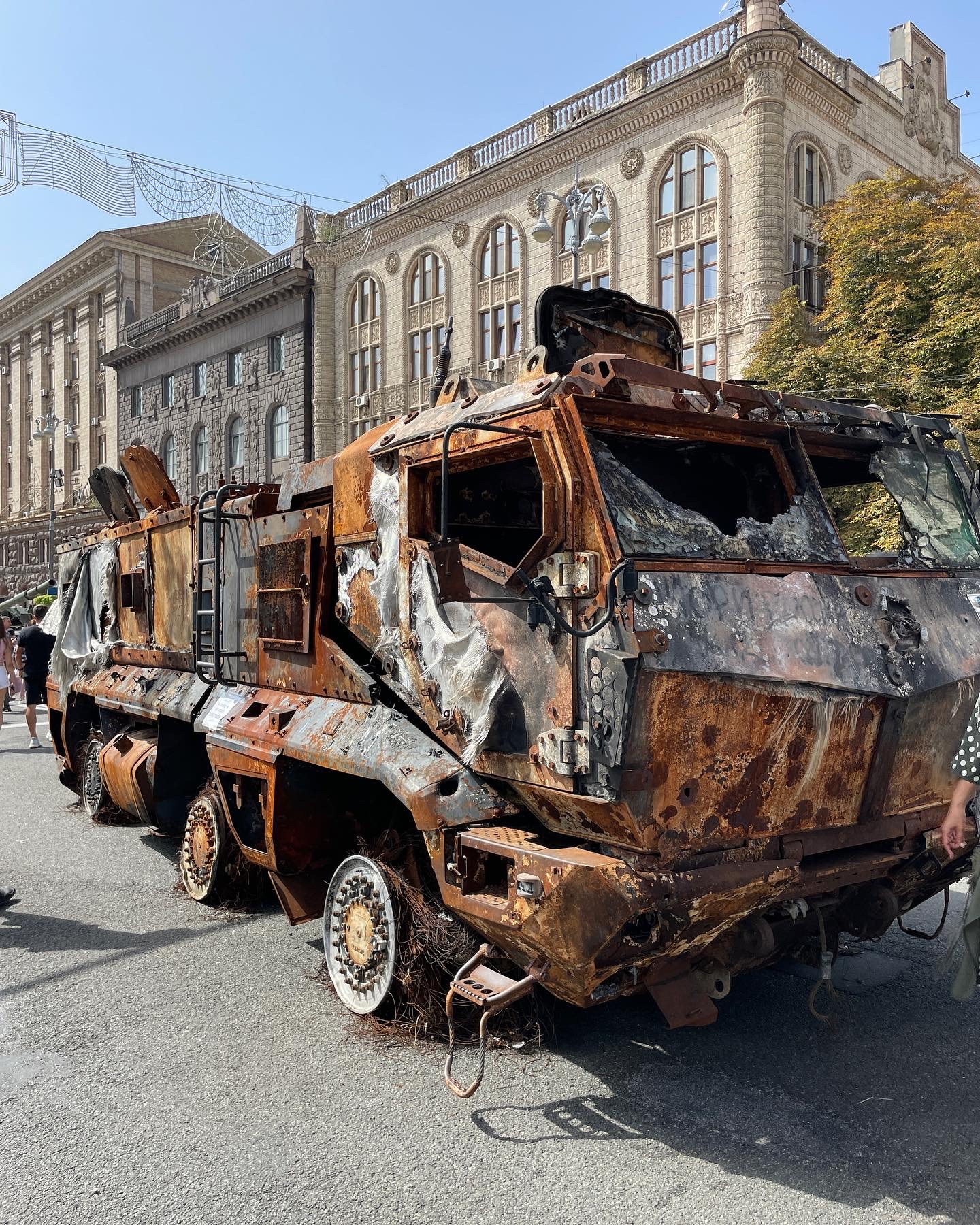
Destroyed Russian KAMAZ-63968 Typhoon at an exhibition in Kyiv, 2022

In the car the Combat Information and Control System (CICS) GALS-D1M to monitor and control the operation of the engine, calculating machines roll, tilt, road speed, location, etc. The independent hydropneumatic suspension allows the driver to change the ride height on the road, using remote control within 400 mm. KamAZ-63968 is equipped with five cameras for review the troop unit and cockpit. Cabin is equipped with folding displays, showing how the state of the car is, and an external review.

== Technical specifications and performance ==
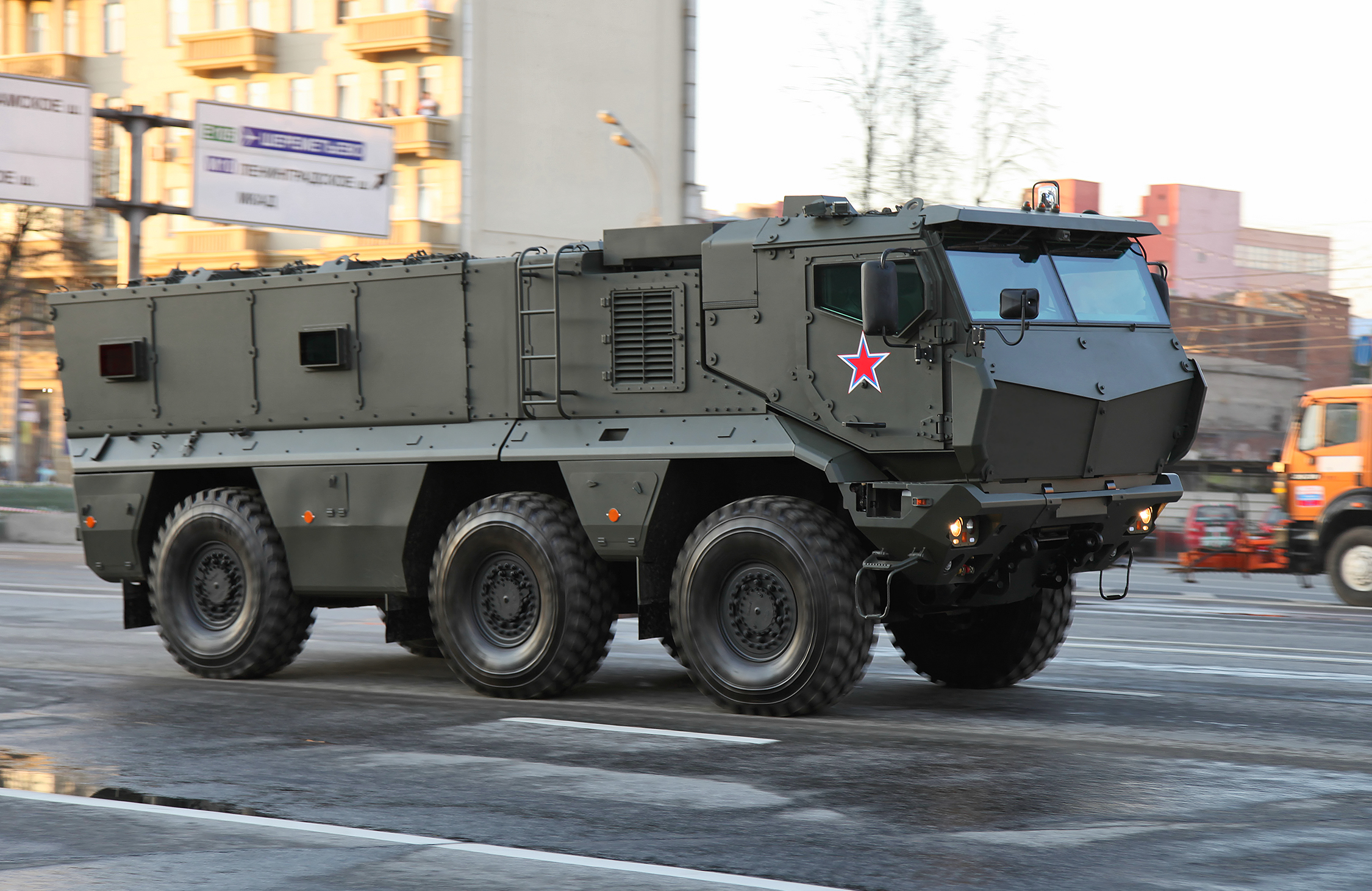
KamAZ-63968 Typhoon

- Crew: Depends on configuration, up to 16.
- Axles: 6×6, two front axles, rear one is subject to the normal weight distribution of machine (cab is very heavy).
- Length: 899 cm (29 ft 6 in)
- Width: 255 cm (8 ft 4 in)
- Height:
  - cab: 312 cm (10 ft 3 in)
  - body/fuselage: 330 cm (10 ft 10 in)
- Wheelbase: n/a
- Ground clearance: adjustable
- Turning radius: less than 10 m (33 ft)
- Lifting angle: 23–30°
- Wheel rotation angle: 39°
- Tires - 16.00R20, with special run-flat tire with inserts diverting the blast wave, using an automatic tire inflation pressure level and the change in the tire (1 to 4.5 atm) depending on the road surface.
- Curb weight: 21 tons, gross weight - 24 tons
- Maximum speed: 105 km/h (65 mph)
- Cruising range: 1,200 km (750 mi)
- Fuel consumption per 100 km: less than 35 L (9.2 US gal)

== Variants ==
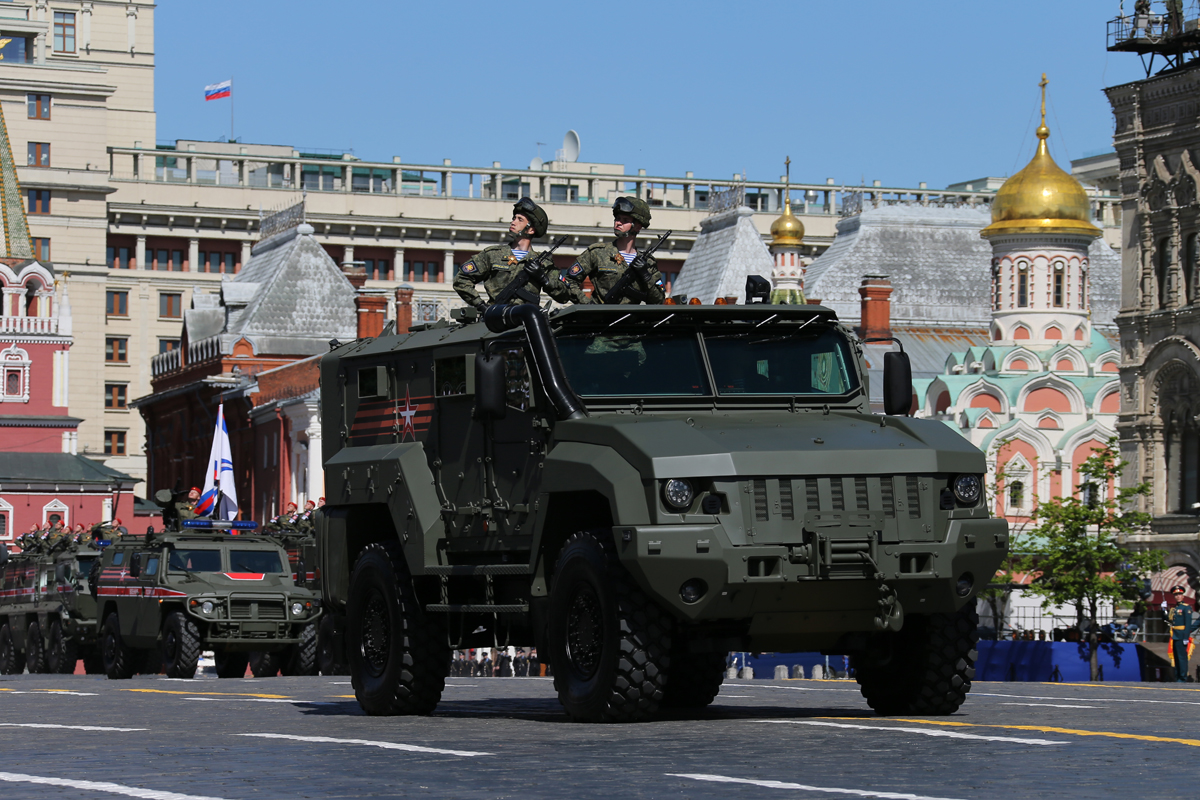
KamAZ-53949 Typhoon

=== 4x4 Family ===
- KamAZ-5388 - 4x4 Armoured chassis cab
- KamAZ-5388 - 4x4 Armoured personnel carrier
- KamAZ-53888 - 4x4 Armoured cargo vehicle

=== 6x6 Family ===
- KamAZ-6396 - 6x6 Armoured chassis cab
- KamAZ-6396 - 6x6 Armoured cargo vehicle
- KamAZ-63968 - 6x6 Armoured personnel carrier

=== 8x8 Family ===
- KamAZ-6398 - 8x8 Armoured cargo vehicle
- KamAZ-63988 - 8x8 Armoured personnel carrier

== Derivatives ==
=== KamAZ-63969 ===
Solid-body, 6x6 wheeled amphibious armoured personnel carrier (APC) with a remote-controlled weapon station.

== Gallery ==
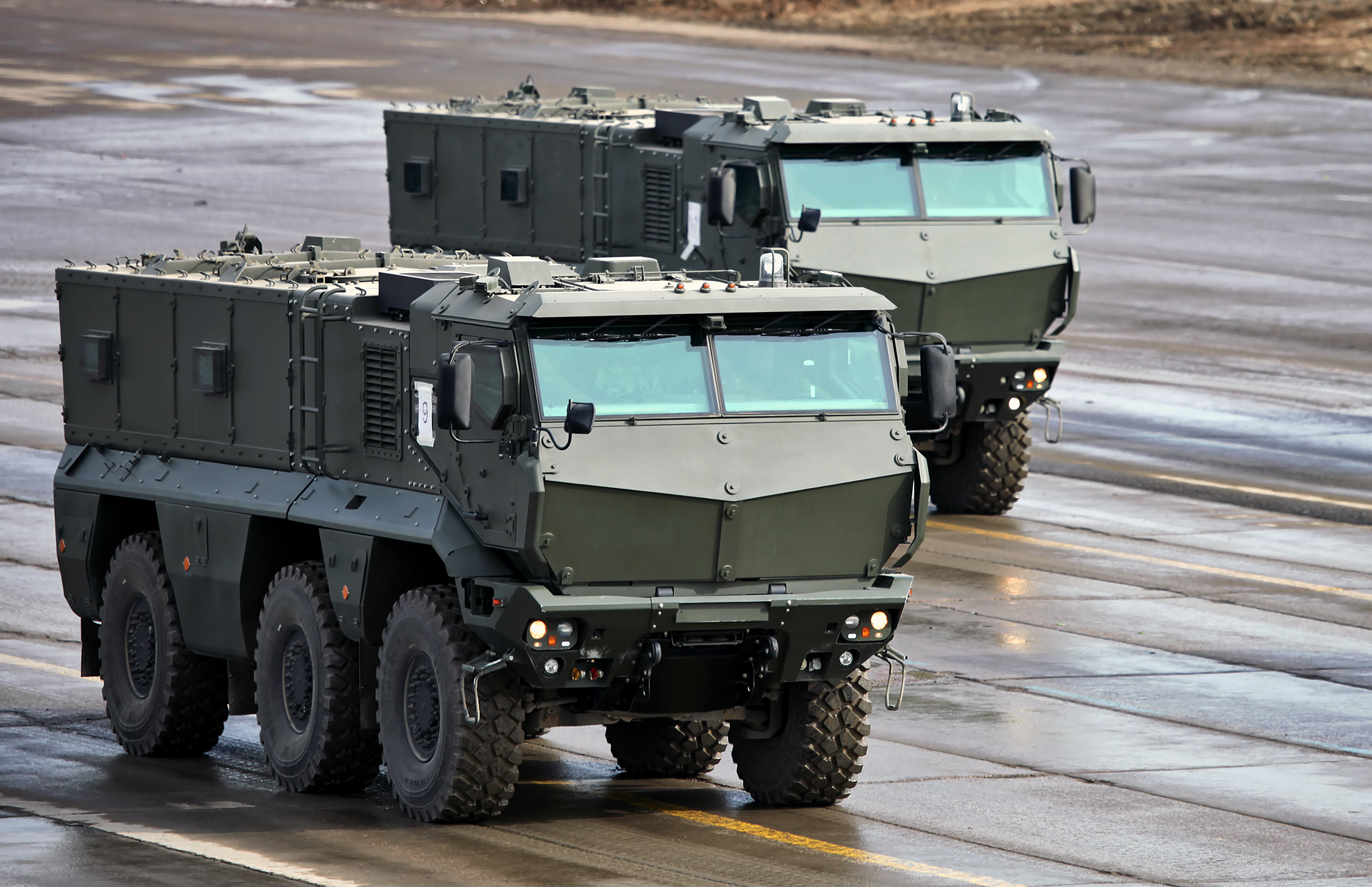

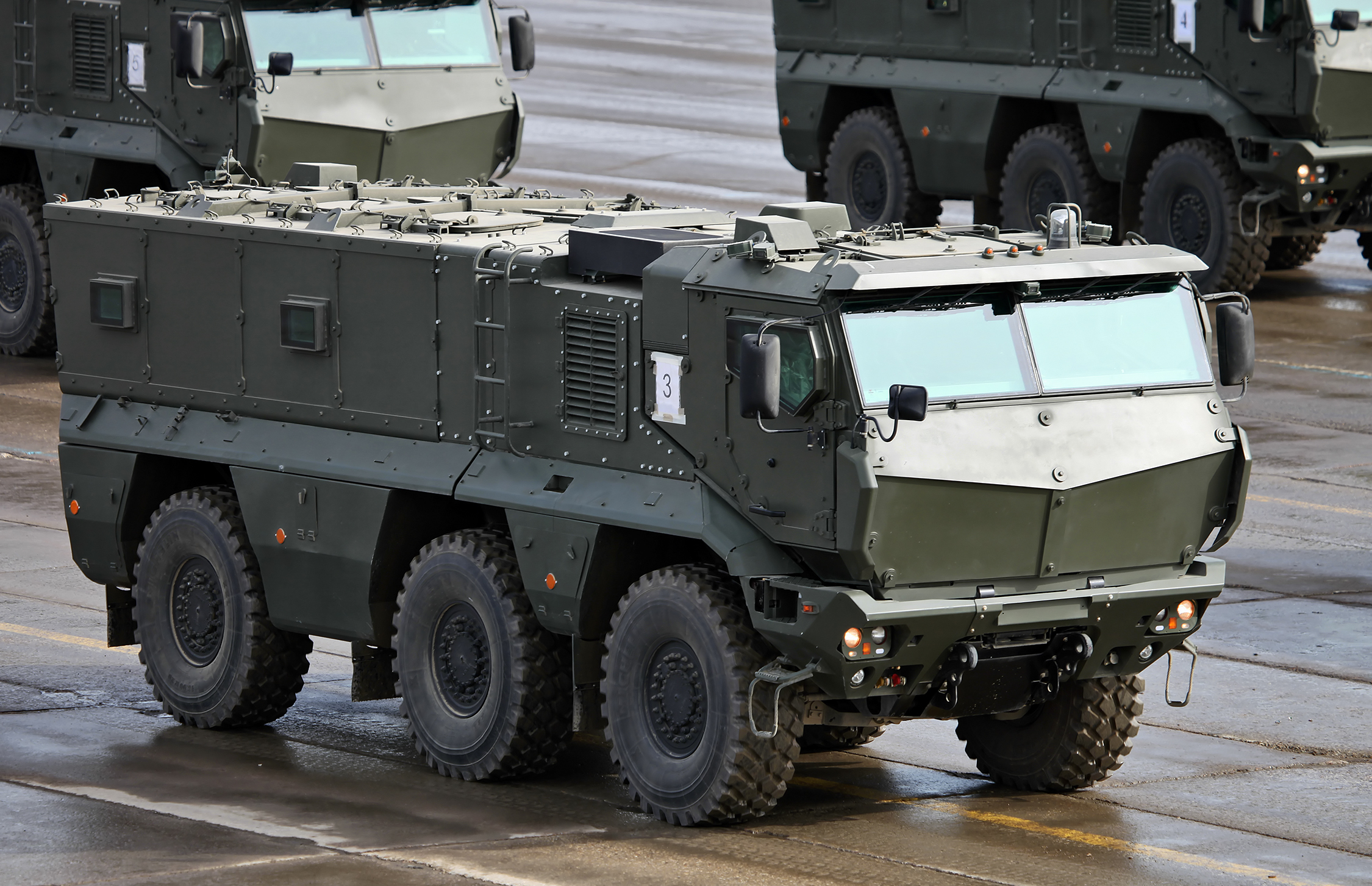

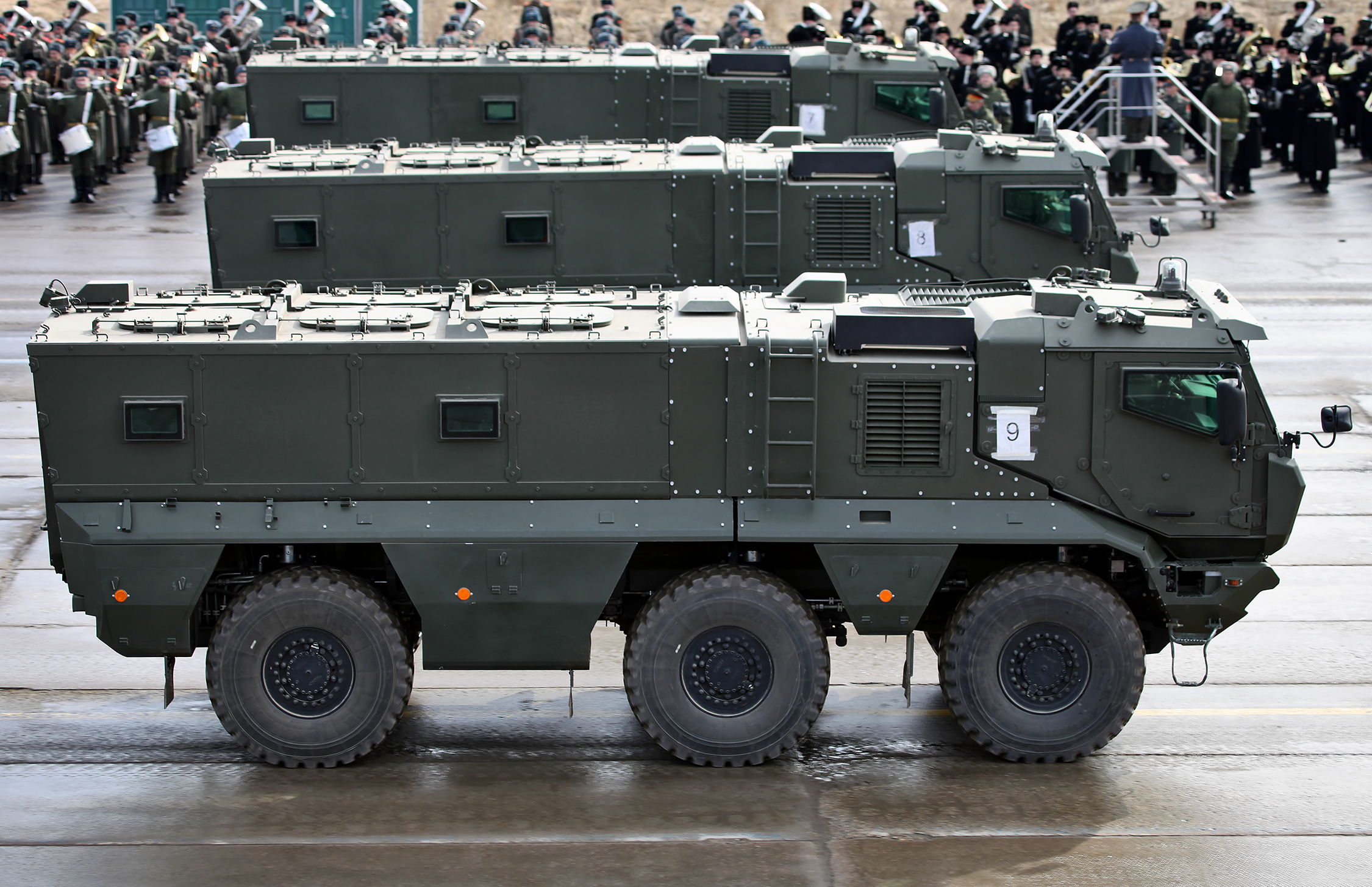

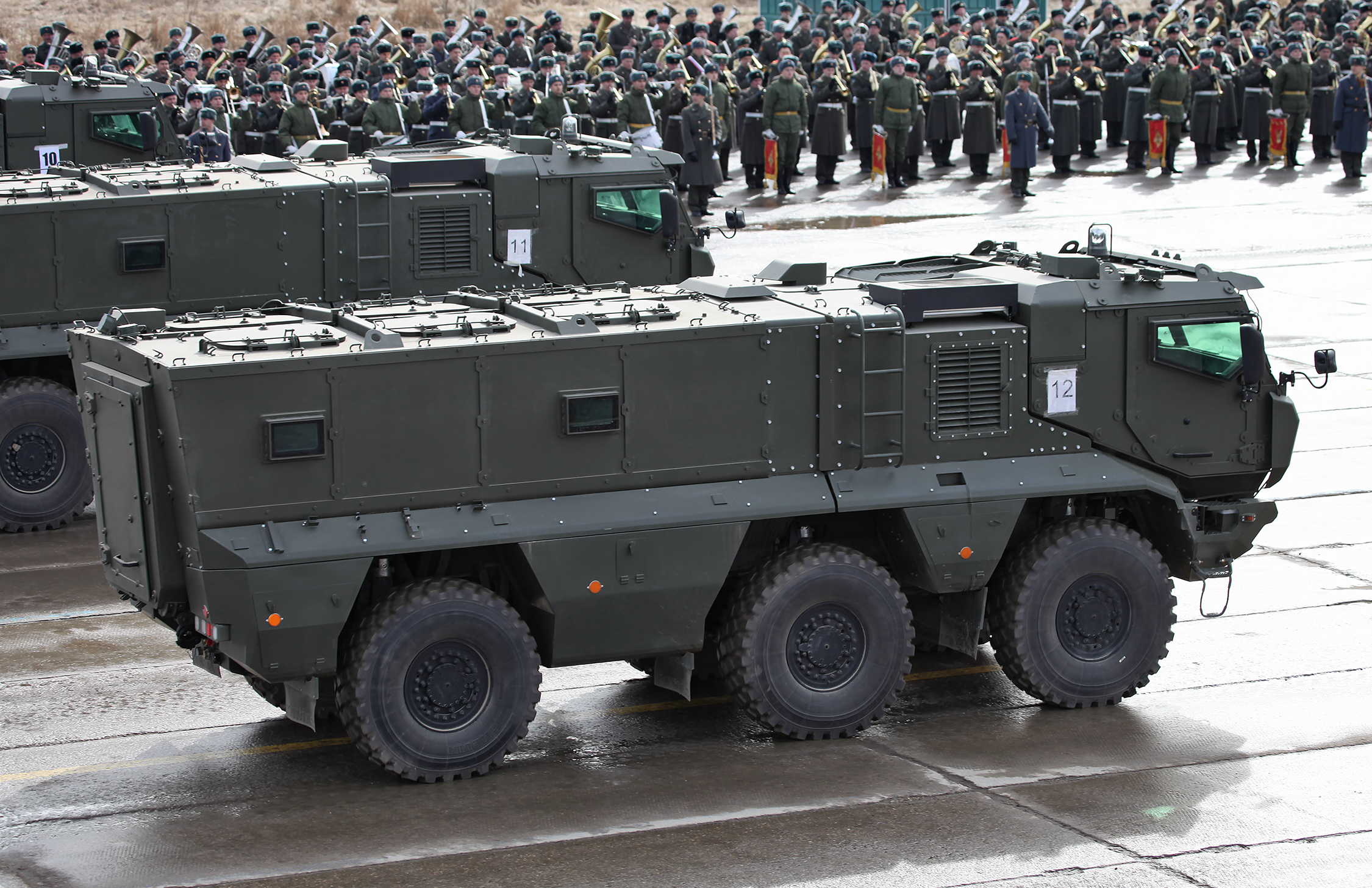

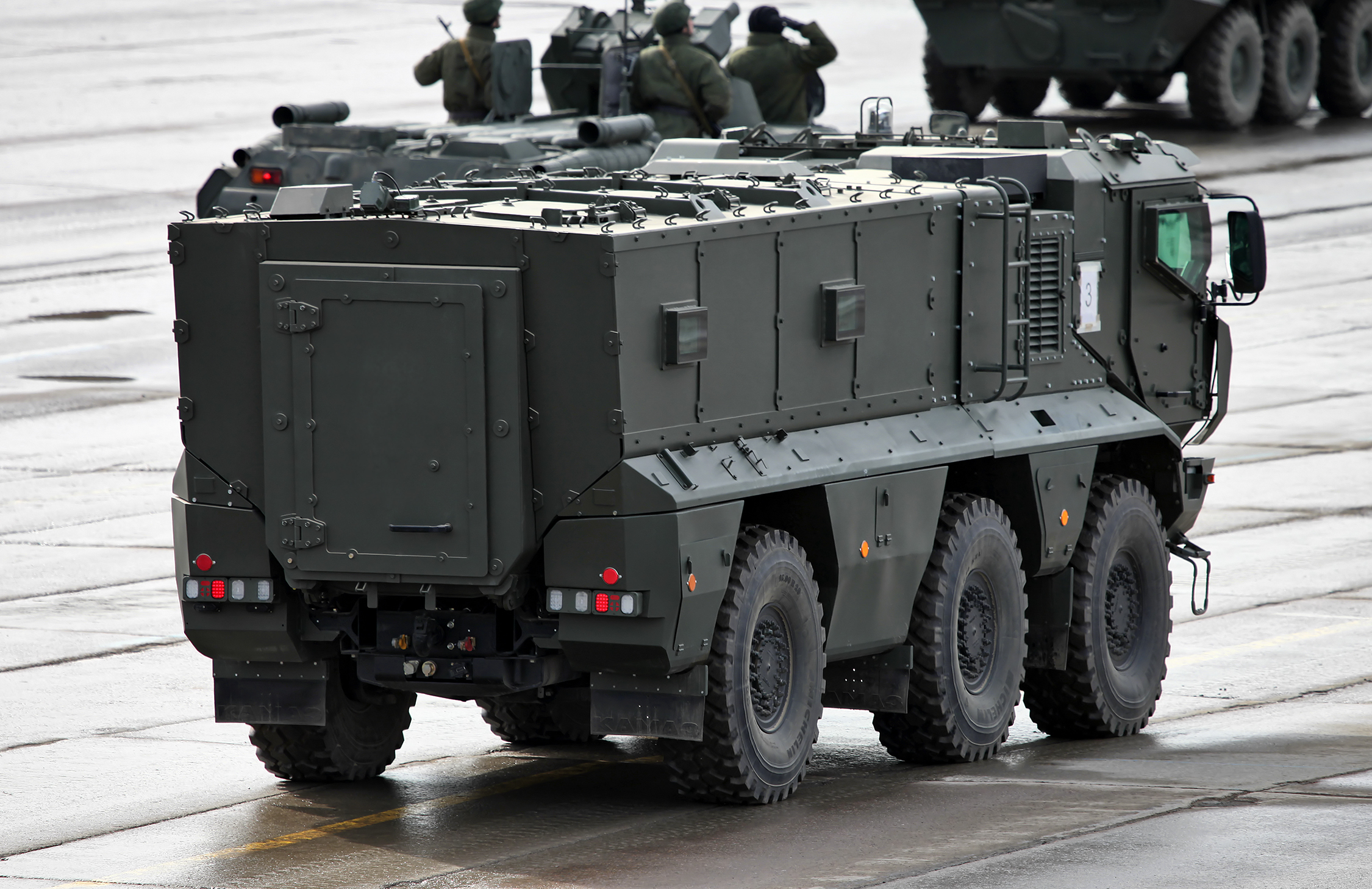

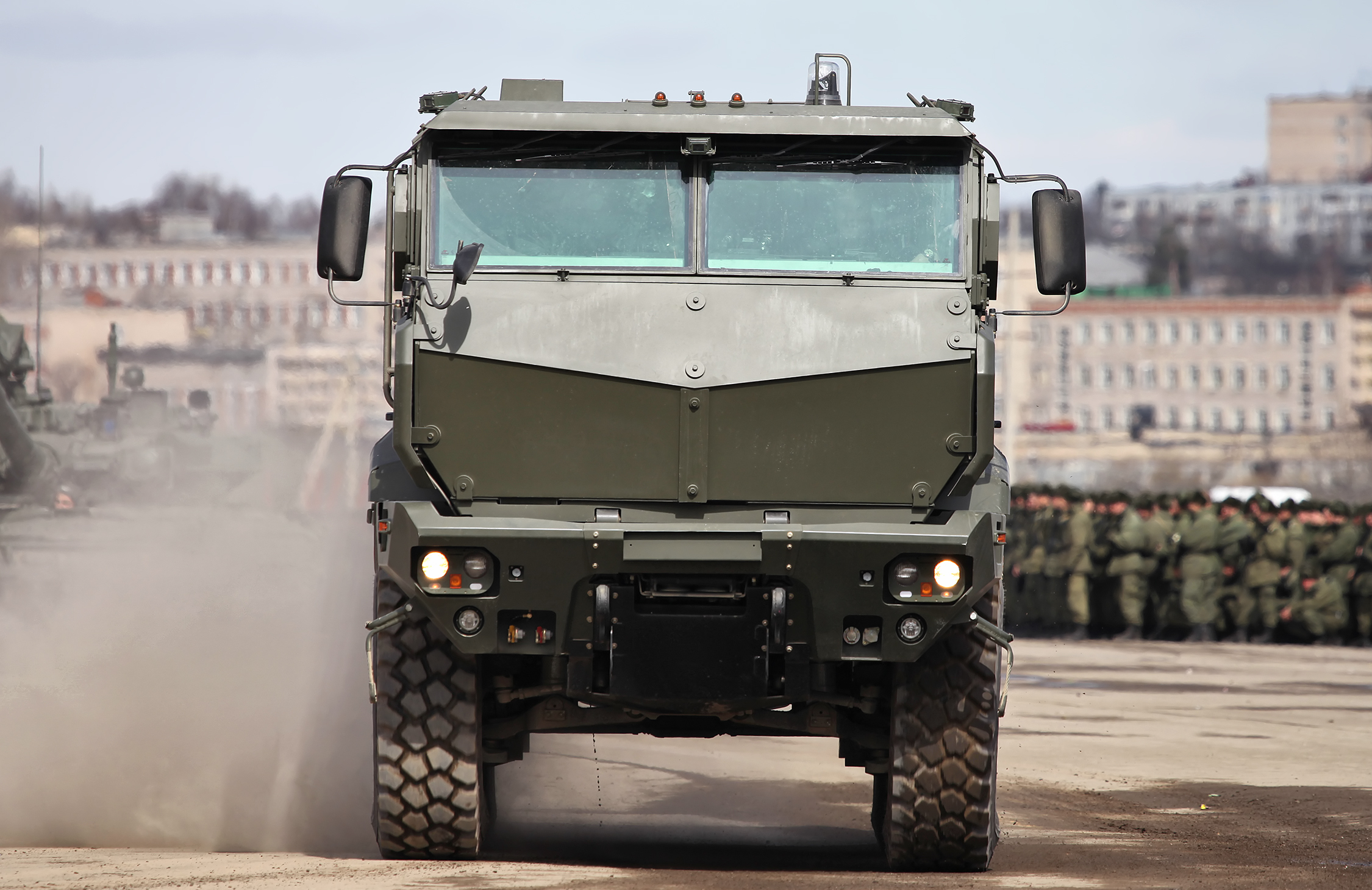

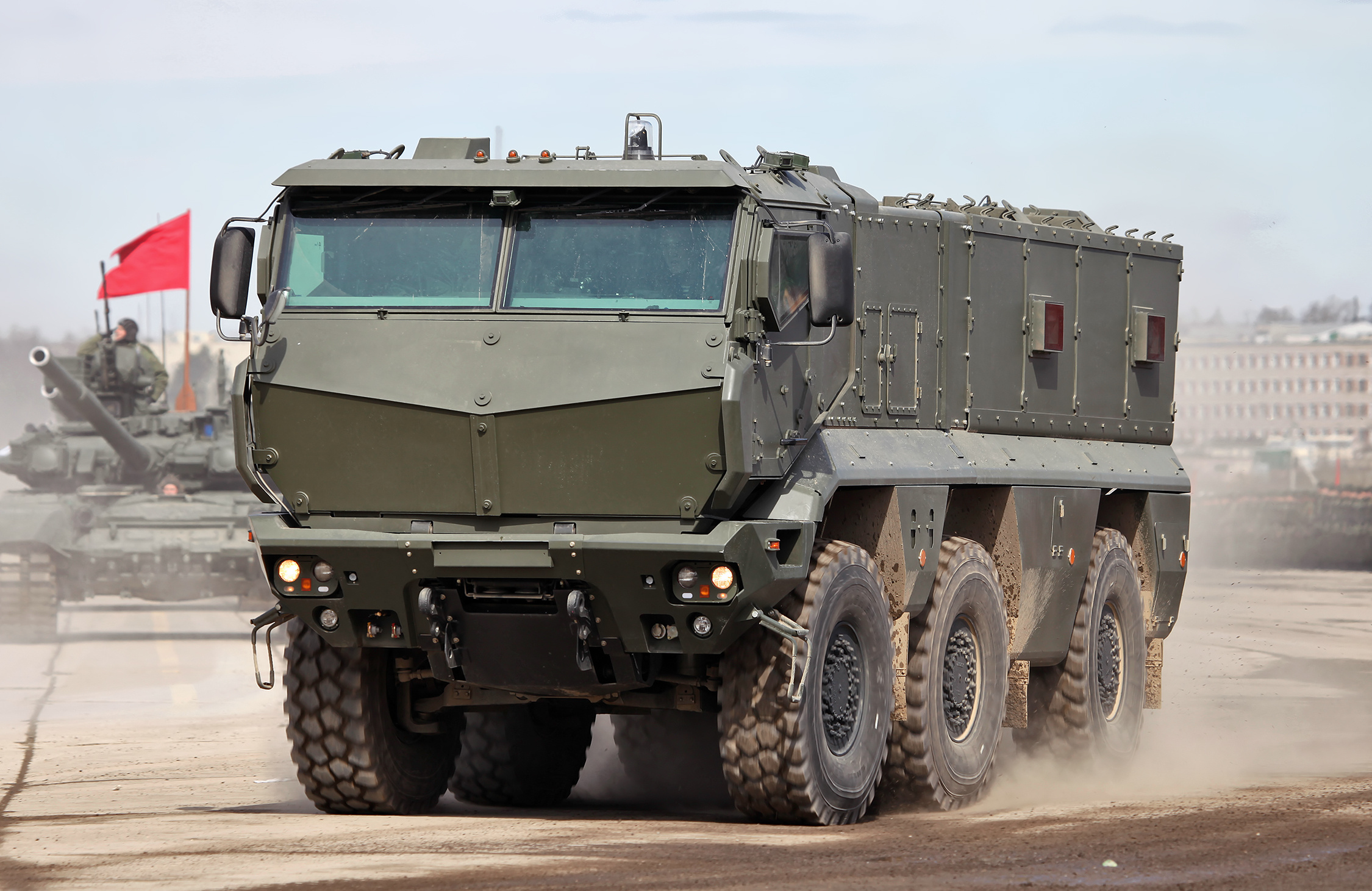

== Operators ==
- Russia: In service since 2015.
- Turkmenistan
- Ukraine: Seven captured Typhoon and Typhoon-K vehicles, with an additional four captured K-53949 Linza armored field ambulances.
- Uzbekistan: Armed Forces of the Republic of Uzbekistan
- Ethiopia

== See also ==
- Ural Typhoon - Ural Trucks Typhoon variant
- ZIL Karatel
