= Typhoon (armored fighting vehicles family) =

Russian family of MRAP armored fighting vehicles

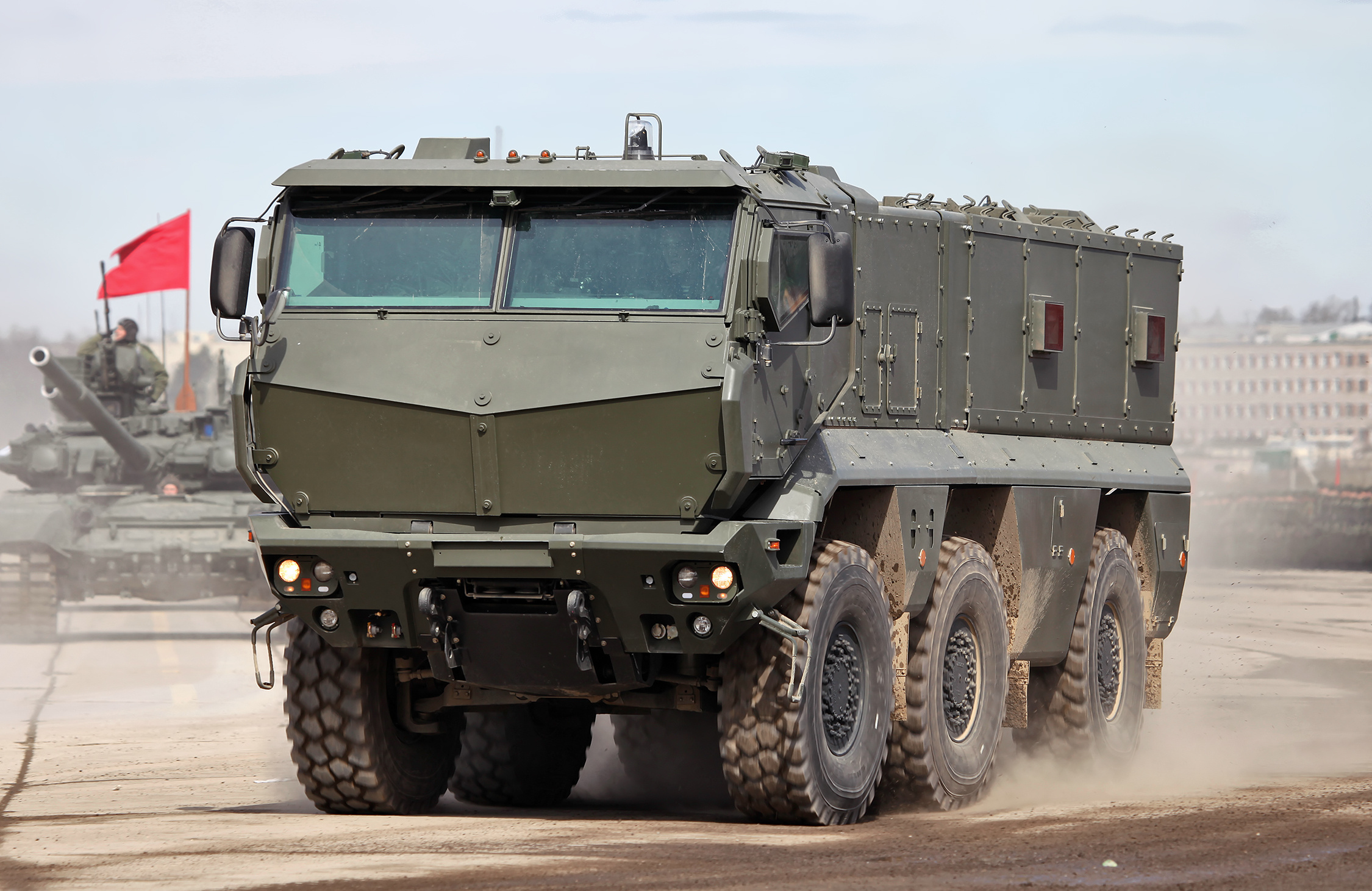
KamAZ-63968 Typhoon-K

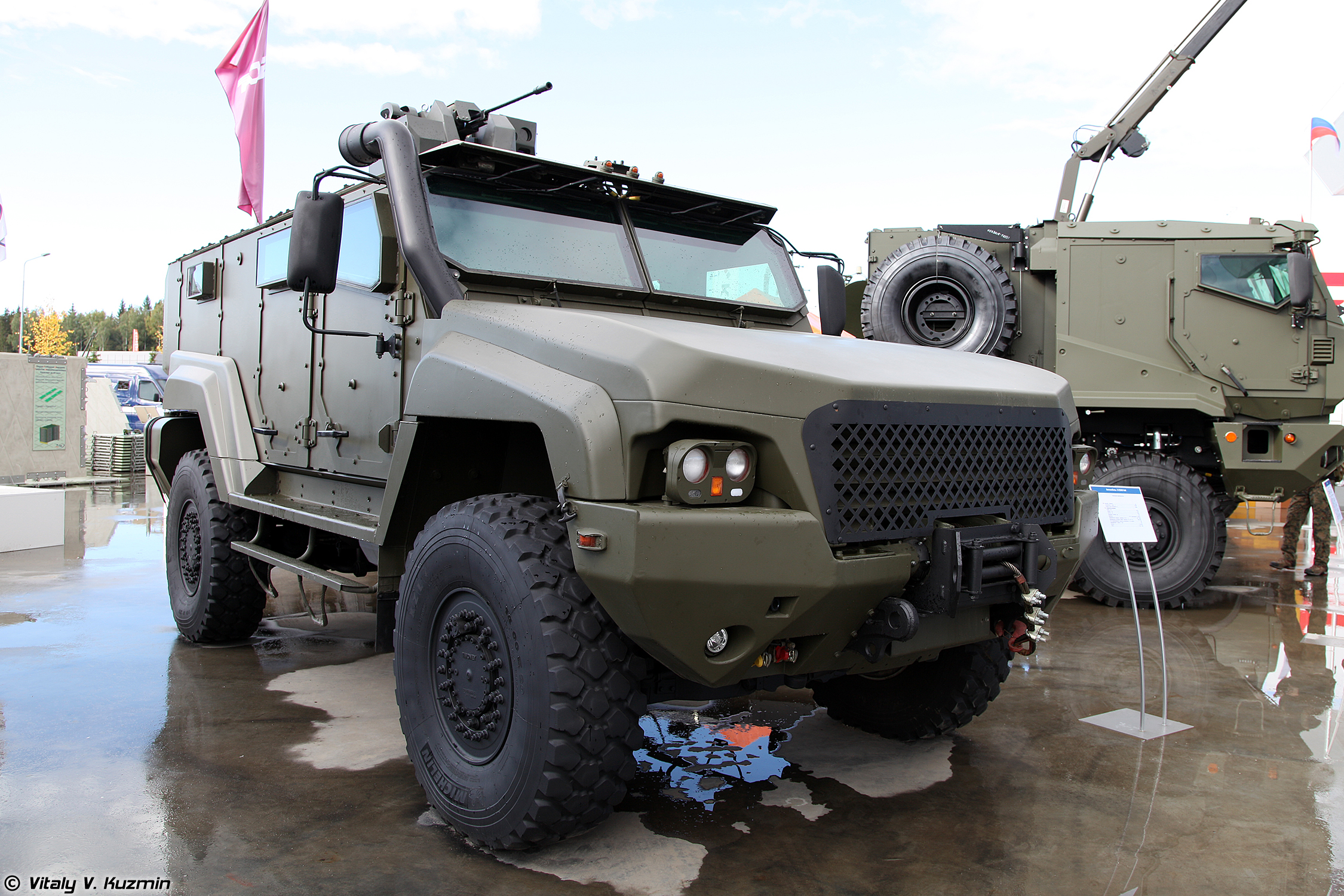
KamAZ-53949 Typhoon-L MRAP

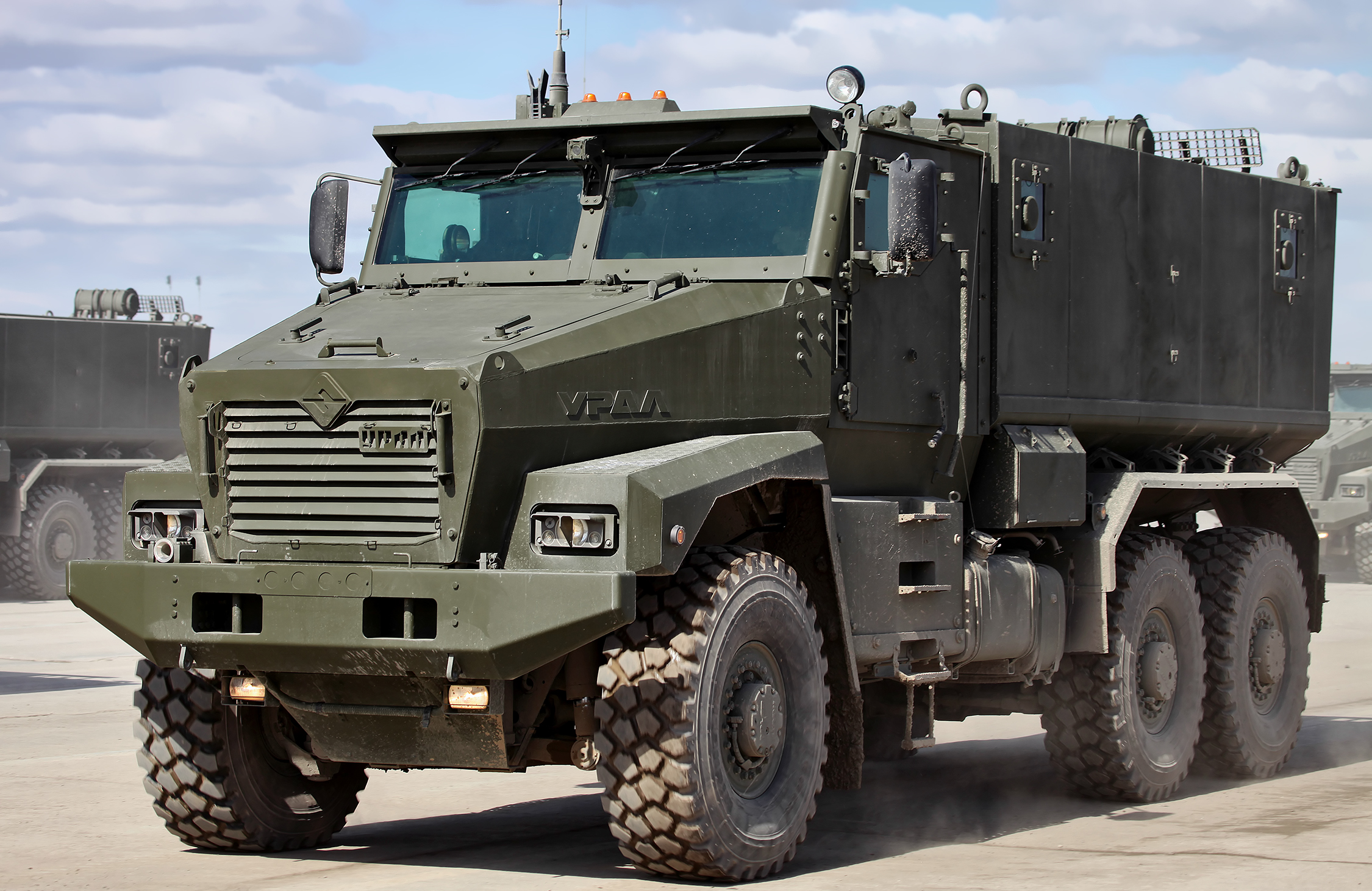
Ural-63095 Typhoon-U

Typhoon is a Russian family of Mine-Resistant Ambush Protected (MRAP) armored fighting vehicles (AFVs) in service since 2014. Around 120 Russian companies including KamAZ, Gaz-Group, and Bauman University, etc. are taking part in Typhoon program. The main aim of the program is to design a unified platform for all Russian armored wheeled vehicles.

== Role ==
The Typhoon family of armored vehicles is intended for the troop transport (armoured personnel carrier) role, and through the installation of various special equipment or weapon modules allows its use in specialized roles such as self propelled anti-aircraft artillery, UAV carriers, cranes, tow trucks and others.

== History ==
The history of the "Typhoon" family began in 2010, when Minister of Russian Federation Armed Forces approved the "Development of Russian Federation Armed Forces military vehicles for the period until 2020" program which includes "Typhoon MRAP program". The first vehicles were shown in 2011.

== Design ==
All Typhoon variants use the same family of engines (JMZ-536), information and management system, mine protection and suspension. Mine protection is provided by a V-shaped bottom, energy absorbing seats and explosion corresponds to 3b in accordance with STANAG 4569 (explosive device up to 8 kg of TNT). All utilize composite body armor (ceramic and steel), as well as provide bulletproof round protection on the fourth level of the standard STANAG 4569 (14.5 mm armor-piercing bullets B-32). All armored personnel carrier variants can have installed a remotely controlled machine-gun unit. In the vehicle roof are hatches for emergency evacuation of personnel in case of a rollover. Along the perimeter of armored vehicles there are mounted video cameras that allow crewmen to monitor the situation without leaving the transport module, and to control the vehicle in the event of an inability to use the windshield. Habitable space on all machines is sealed for chemical, biological, radiological and nuclear defense, and is supported by maintaining the crew and troop compartment at an artificial overpressure through a HLF-100 air filtration system. All vehicles are available in two, three or four axle versions.

== Variants ==
There are two primary manufacturers: Kamaz and Ural.

=== KAMAZ ===
- Kamaz-63968 Typhoon-K Modular MRAP vehicle.
- KamAZ-63969 Solid-body, 6×6 wheeled amphibious armoured personnel carrier (APC) with a remote-controlled gun.
- KamAZ-53949 Typhoon-L MRAP – 4×4 wheeled patrol armoured personnel carrier (APC). Renamed to Phoenix after an import substitution program was completed in 2023.
- K-4386 Typhoon-VDV – 4×4 vehicle armed with 30 mm 2A42 autocannon and seating eight personnel. In service for Russian Airborne Troops and available for export since 2021. The Naparnik escort and control vehicle was developed on its basis and adopted in September 2021. It has 350 horsepower, can reach the speed of 105 km/h on roads, and can be transported by the Il-76, the An-124 or the Mi-26. The vehicle has infrared and daylight sensors, is equipped with a variety of machine guns (7.62×54mm and 12.7×108mm), and carries a remote weapons station developed at the "Burevestnik" institute. The RWS is equipped with a 2A42 30×165mm cannon, an AGS-30 30×29mm grenade launcher, and a PKTM 7.62×54mm machine gun. Armour is comparable to the NATO stanag 3.
- Linza – The Linza medevac version using the K-53949 chassis can transport up to 10 wounded soldiers.

=== Ural ===
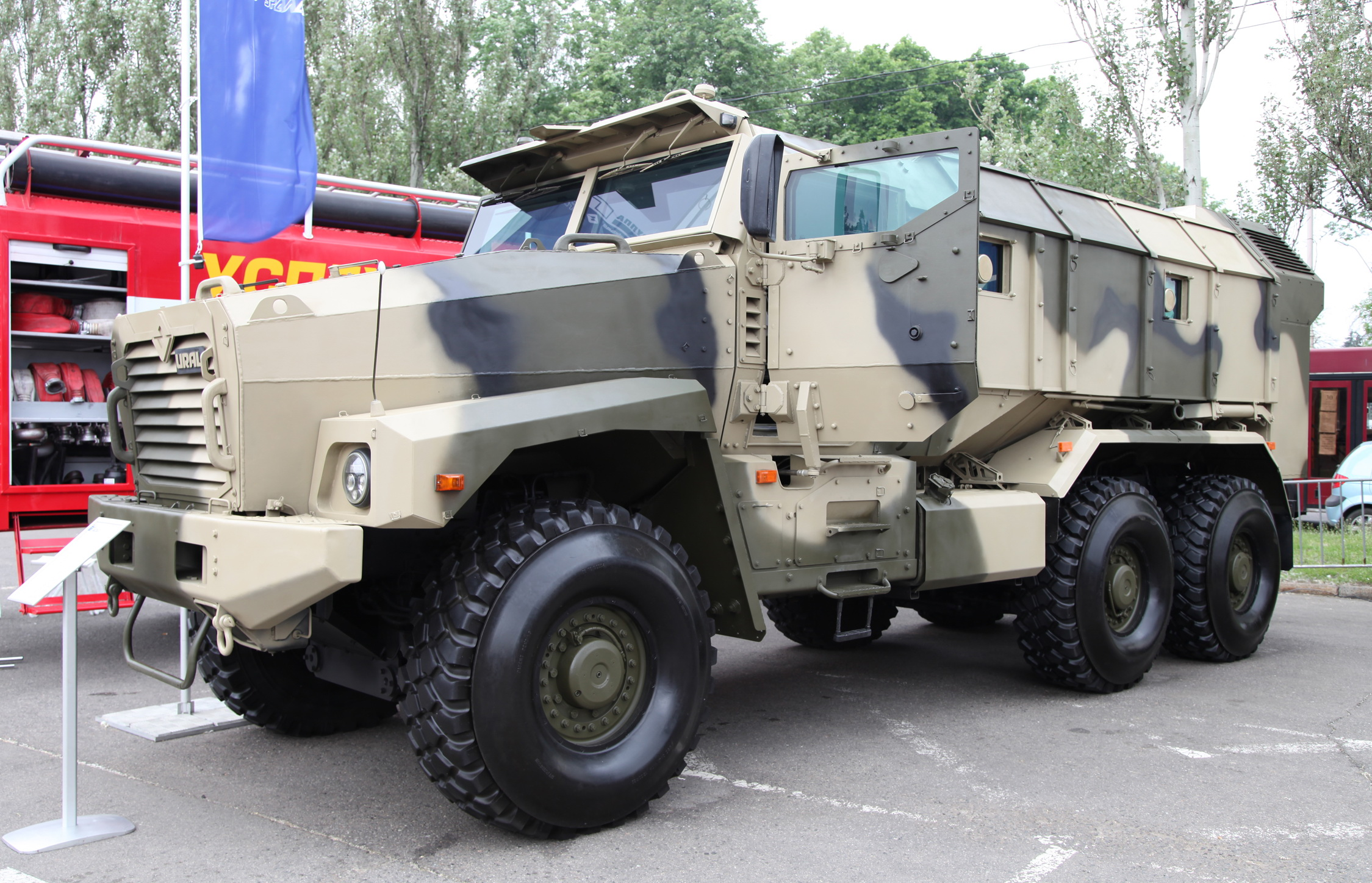
Ural-63099 Typhoon

- Ural-63095 and Ural-63099 Typhoon – The Ural Typhoons are Multirole modular 6×6 MRAP Infantry mobility vehicle vehicles. Both have a crew of three, the 63099 seats twelve troops, and the 63095 seats sixteen.

=== SPATGM version ===
The anti-tank version is equipped with two rooftop quad tube launchers for the Kornet-EM ATGM.

=== Typhoon-PVO ===
MANPADS-carrier vehicle. Completed state trials in 2024 and entered serial production in 2025.
