= ZIL Karatel =

- Type: Infantry mobility vehicle
- Place of origin: Russian Federation

Production history
- Designer: ZiL
- Designed: 2013

Specifications
- Mass: 12,000 kg
- Length: 6.330 meters
- Width: 2.397 meters
- Height: 2.566 meters
- Crew: 10
- Engine: diesel 730 hp
- Transmission: automatic
- Suspension: 4×4 wheeled
- Maximum speed: 150 kilometres per hour (93 mph)

ZIL Karatel (Russian: ЗИЛ Каратель) is a family of Russian multi-functional, modular, armoured, mine resistant MRAP vehicles.

== Versions ==
Can be used as reconnaissance, command and staff vehicles, machinery of EW or communications, ambulance or to conduct engineering, radiation, chemical and biological reconnaissance or transportation. It is based on the KamAZ-4911.

== See also ==
- Kamaz Typhoon
- Ural Typhoon
