= Tanks of the Soviet Union =

This article deals with the history and development of tanks of the Soviet Union and its successor state, the Russian Federation; from their first use after World War I, into the interwar period, during World War II, the Cold War and modern era.

== Overview ==
After World War I (1914-1918), many countries wanted to have tanks, but only a few had the industrial resources to design and build them. During and after World War I, Britain and France were the intellectual leaders in tank design, with other countries generally following and adopting their designs. This early lead would be gradually lost during the course of the 1930s, when the Soviet Union and Germany began to design and build their own tanks. The 1919 Treaty of Versailles had severely limited Germany's industrial output. Therefore, in order to circumvent Germany's treaty restrictions, German industrial firms formed a partnership with the Soviet Union to legally produce weapons and sell them, and along with other factors built up an infrastructure to produce tanks which later made the famous T-34 and other Soviet tanks.

Organisationally, Soviet land forces often included Separate Tank Batttalions (OTBs: Russian: Отдельные танковые батальоны (отб)) for tactical operations — generally under the command of a podpolkovnik (lieutenant colonel).

== History ==
=== General developments influencing Soviet tank design ===
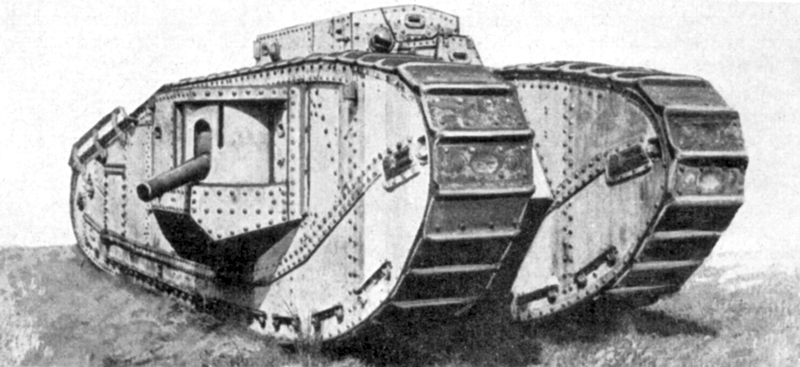
Mark VIII (Liberty) Tank

Imperial Russia had flirted with some designs such as the Tsar Tank which was scrapped, and the Vezdekhod (Вездеход) which did not progress further than a pre-production model due to problems in the design.

The final tank designs in World War I showed a number of trends such as in the US and British produced Mark VIII tank for heavy tanks. However, the French Renault FT set the pattern for almost all tanks that followed it; these tanks generally had lower track profiles and more compact hulls, and mounted their weapons in turrets. Following the Great War, Britain continued its technical dominance of tank design, and British designs, particularly those from Vickers-Armstrong, formed the basis for many Soviet tank designs of the 1930s, including the T-26 and BT series. Designs such as the Vickers Medium Mk II brought to the forefront the fully rotating turret on top and dual-use 3-pounder gun (that could fire both high-explosive and anti-tank shells), while the Vickers Carden-Lloyd machine gun carriers influenced the tankette concept such as the Soviet T-27.

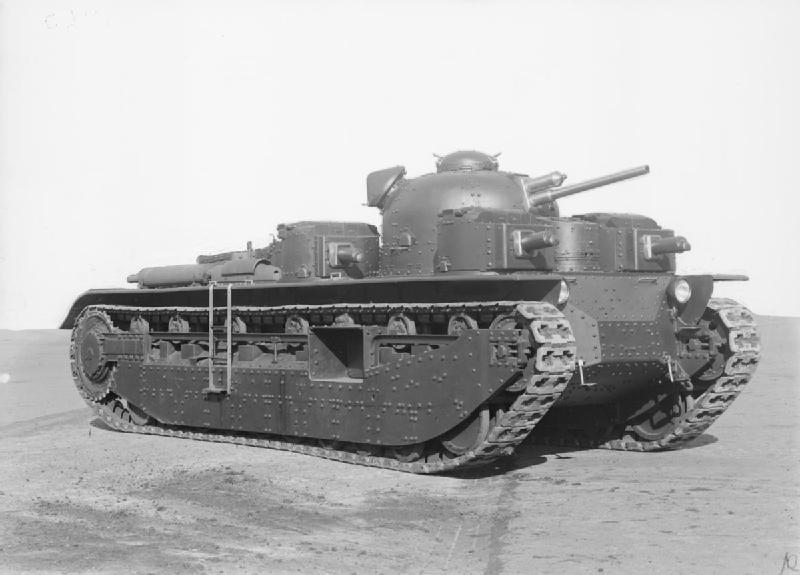
Vickers A1E1 "Independent"

Another notable design that influenced the Soviets was the Vickers A1E1 Independent, a large multi-turreted heavy tank built in 1925. Its design influenced the Soviet T-35 heavy tank.

The Spanish Civil War showed that tank-versus-tank engagements and tank-versus-towed antitank gun engagements would now be a major consideration. It became clear that future tanks would need to be heavily armoured and carry larger guns.

The Soviet Union's efforts in tank design and production must be understood in the context of the experience of the Russian Civil War and the growth of Soviet industry. During the civil war, the use of armoured trains and artillery trains was common. This tended to lead to a greater interest in tanks and armoured cars compared to some western nations. The rapid growth of heavy industry in the USSR under the Five-Year plans made a large tank fleet possible. The Soviets also spent tens of millions of dollars on U.S. equipment and technology to modernise dozens of automotive and tractor factories, which would later produce tanks and armoured vehicles. Joseph Stalin's enthusiasm for industrialisation and mechanisation drove an aggressive military development program, resulting in by far the largest and broadest tank inventory of all nations by the late 1930s.

In the U.S., J. Walter Christie had developed a series of fast tanks, based on his revolutionary Christie suspension system. This was combined with very high power-to-weight ratios achieved by fitting large aircraft engines in his tanks. Some of his prototypes were purchased by the Soviet Union, and were to be developed into the BT tanks and eventually, on the eve of World War II, the famous T-34. The BT series in turn influenced the British cruiser tank designs such as the A-13 Cruiser Mk IV, Crusader, and others.

The French pioneered manufacturing methods in the use of very large castings to form gun mantlets, turrets and eventually, entire tank hulls. The widespread use of casting turrets was copied by the USSR, and led the way in rationalizing designs for fast production, eliminating unnecessary components or manufacturing steps that added little value, which later was to be incorporated in the mass production of their tanks such as the T-34.

==== Russian Civil War ====
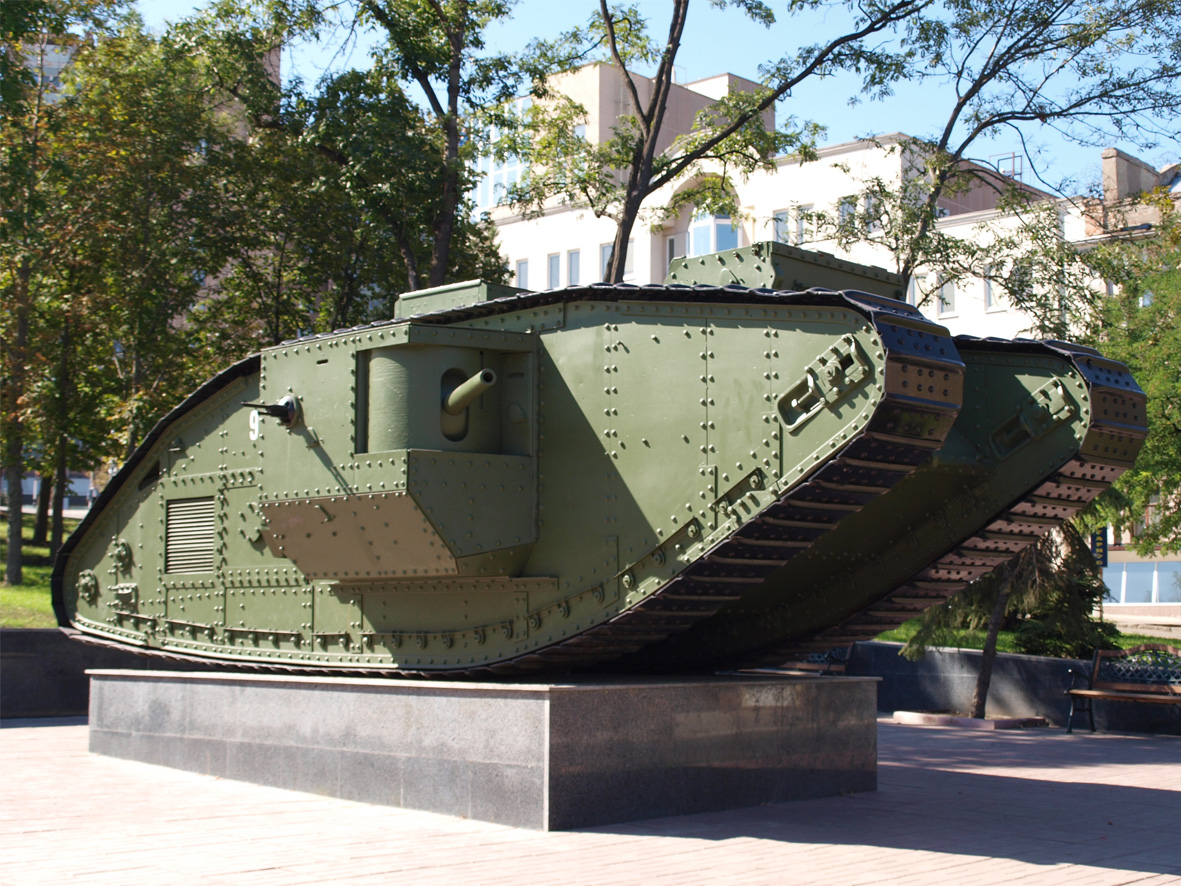
Mark V Composite tank used in Russian Civil War.

In Soviet Russia, the so-called armoured forces (броневые силы) preceded the Tank Corps. They consisted of the mechanized armoured units (автобронеотряды) made of armored vehicles and armored trains.

The country did not have its own tanks at the time, but their forces did come across the Mark V tanks. A number of the Mark V tanks saw service in the Allied intervention in the Russian Civil War on the White Russian side. Most were subsequently captured and used by the Red Army during the war. Three were reactivated in 1941 for use in the Battle of Stalingrad. In January 1918, the Red Army established the Soviet of Armored Units (Совет броневых частей, or Центробронь), later renamed to Central Armored Directorate and then once again to Chief Armored Directorate (Главное броневое управление).

During the war, the Nizhny Novgorod Machine Factory built armored trains, armoured carriages, and weapons for the vessels of the Volga Military Flotilla. In 1920, the factory remanufactured fourteen burnt-out French Renault FT tanks for the Red Army, the Russkiy Renos, and assembled a single new copy, named 'Freedom Fighter Lenin'.

==== Interwar period ====
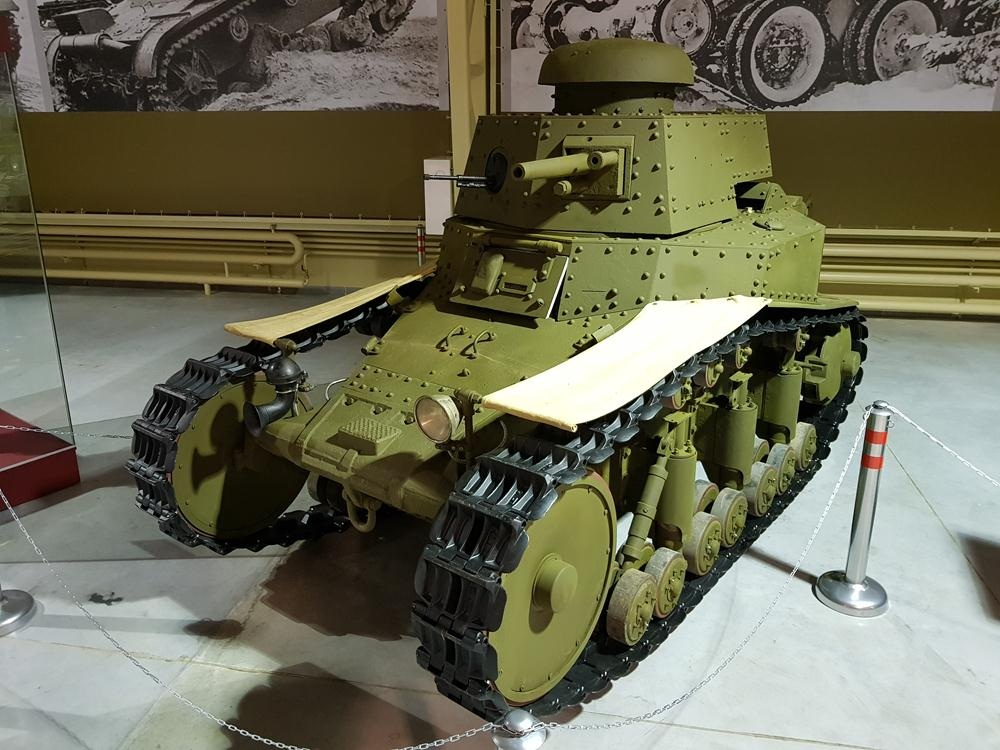
T-18 light tank

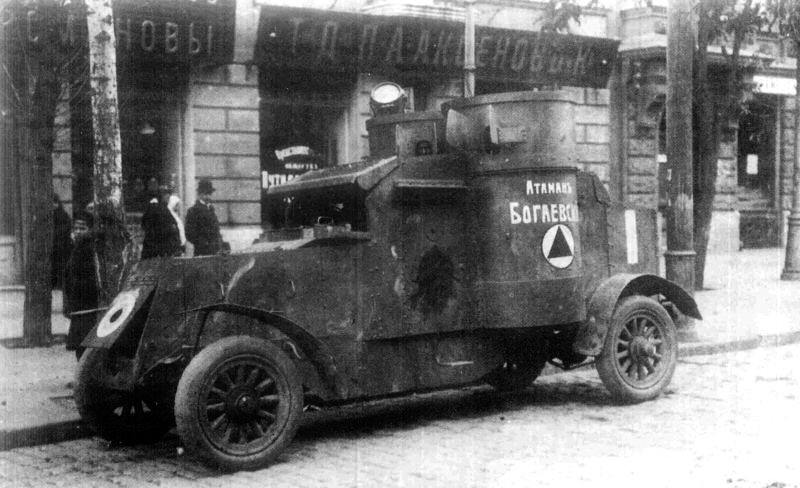
Austin Armoured Car 3rd series used by the Don Cossack forces, 1919

Initially, the tanks and armoured cars in Soviet hands were a mix of captured Renault FTs and a few British tanks and British-built Austins left behind in the civil war. The first conventional Soviet tank, the T-18 (sometimes called MS-1), was a fairly close copy of the French Renault FT, but with improved suspension and a larger turret.

In 1926, under a secret annex to the Treaty of Rapallo, the Soviet Union and Germany set up a joint tank school at Kazan in the west of the Urals, which was illegal under the Treaty of Versailles. Both countries learned much about tank design and tactics in this co-operative venture. The Germans provided advice on mechanisation of Soviet heavy industry, and helped develop a sense of professionalism in the Red Army. In 1928, the Soviet Union began the production of the MS-1 tanks (Малый Сопровождения -1, where M stands for "small" and S for "convoy"). In 1929, it established the Central Directorate for Mechanization and Motorization of the Workers’ and Peasants’ Red Army. Tanks became a part of the mechanized corps at this point. From 1929, an experimental Mechanised Brigade was formed, training and developing combined-arms tactics with foreign tanks, armoured cars, tractors, and lorries.

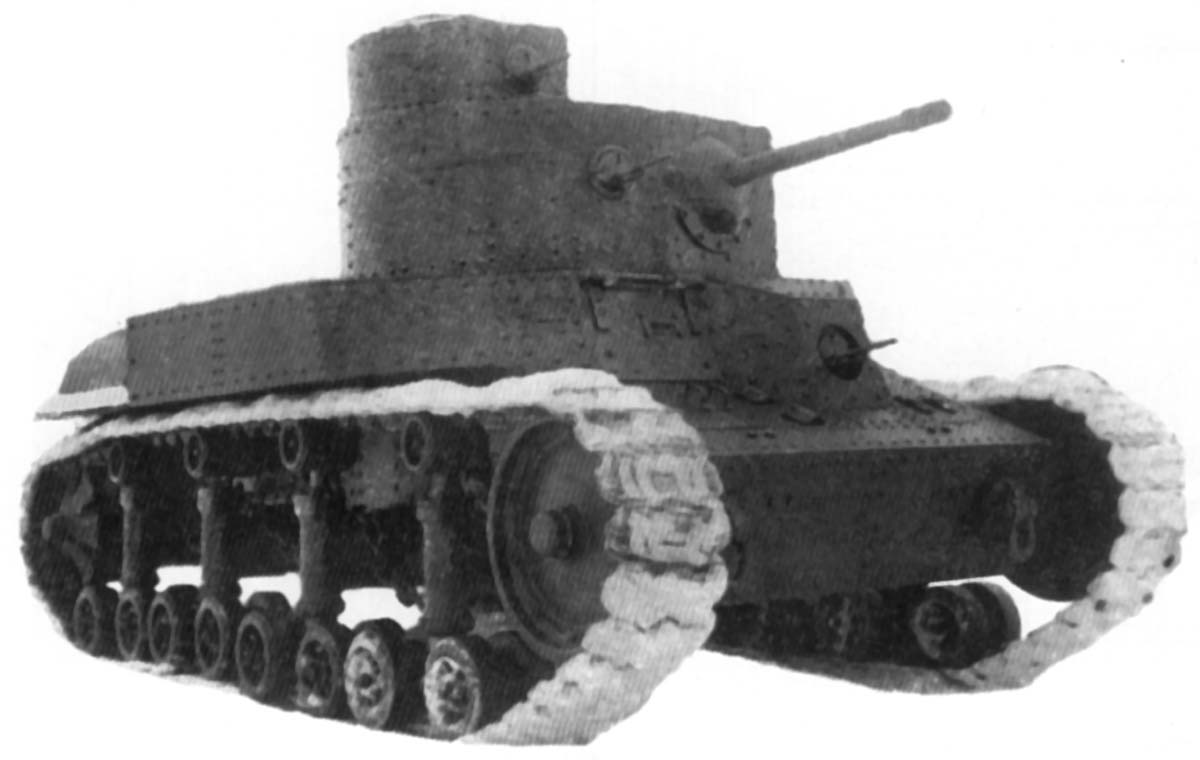
T-24 medium tank

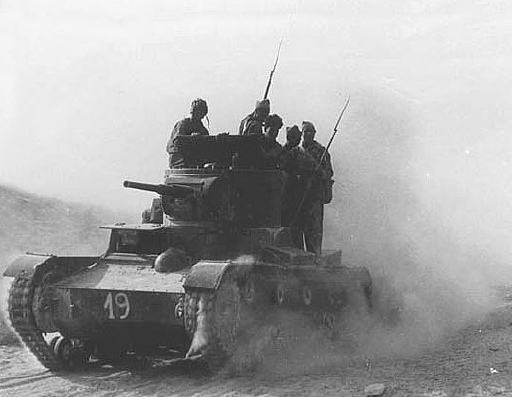
A T-26 tank.

A tank design bureau was established at the Kharkov Locomotive Factory (KhPZ) in Kharkiv, Soviet Ukraine, in 1928. The first tank project of the factory was the T-12 (or T-1-12). This was a larger version of the T-18, with a more powerful engine. It seemed to have been done in parallel to the T-19 light tank which was also based on the FT. The project was re-designated T-24, work was completed fixing problems with the transmission and fuel system, and a larger turret was designed. Initial trials were conducted, during which performance was found satisfactory, although the prototype's engine caught fire, and the turret had to be transferred to a T-12 prototype for further testing. Only a total of twenty-four were built during 1931. The T-24s were originally armed only with machine guns, until the 45 mm guns were installed in the following year.

The T-24 was found unreliable, and was used only for training and parades. Although the T-24 tank was a failure, it gave the KhPZ its initial tank design and production experience, which was applied much more successfully in adopting production of modified U.S. Christie tanks as the BT tank series, starting in 1931.

Based on a mixed force of foreign tanks and imported prototypes, the Soviets developed a large domestic design and production capability. The T-26 light tank was based on the Vickers E (as were many other tanks of the period), chosen after it beat a Soviet FT derivative in trials. In spring 1930, the Soviet buying committee, under the direction of Semyon Ginzburg, had arrived in Great Britain to select tanks, tractors and cars to be used in the Red Army. The Vickers 6-ton was among four models of tanks selected by Soviet representatives during their visit to the Vickers-Armstrongs Company. According to the contract signed on 28 May 1930, the company delivered to the USSR 15 twin-turreted Vickers Mk.E (Type A, armed with two 7.71 mm water-cooled Vickers machine guns) tanks together with full technical documentation to enable series production of the tank in the USSR. The ability of the two turrets of the Type A to turn independently made it possible to fire to both the left and right at once, which was considered advantageous for breakthroughs of field entrenchments. Several Soviet engineers participated in assembly of the tanks at the Vickers Factory in 1930.

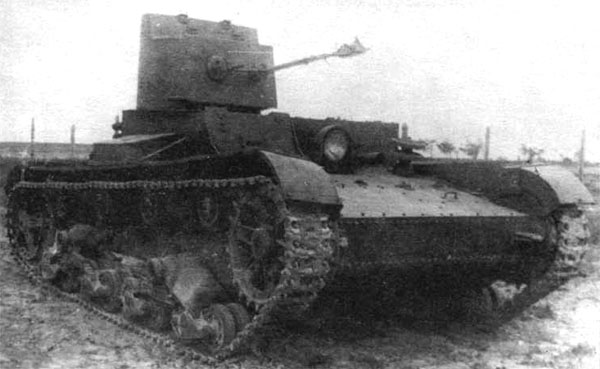
KhT-26 flame-throwing tank. This vehicle was produced in 1935 and partially modernized between 1938 and 1940, when new road wheels with removable bands and an armoured headlight were installed. Kubinka proving ground, 1940.

The Vickers-built 6-ton tanks had the designation V-26 in the USSR. Three British tanks were successfully tested for cross-country ability at the small proving ground near Moscow on Poklonnaya Hill in January 1931. One tank hull was tested for gunfire resistance in August 1931. Kliment Voroshilov ordered the creation of the "Special Commission for the Red Army (RKKA) new tanks" under the direction of S. Ginzburg to define the tank type suitable for the Red Army. The T-19 8-ton light infantry tank, developed by S. Ginzburg under that programme at the Bolshevik Factory in Leningrad was a theoretical competitor to the British Vickers 6-Ton. The first prototype of the complex and expensive T-19 was not finished until August 1931. Because both tanks had advantages and disadvantages, S. Ginzburg suggested developing a more powerful, hybrid tank (the so-called "improved" T-19) with the hull, home-developed engine and armament from the native T-19, and the transmission and chassis from the British Vickers 6-ton. On 13 February 1931, the Vickers 6-Ton light infantry tank, under the designator T-26, officially entered service in the Red Army as the "main tank for close support of combined arms units and tank units of High Command reserve".

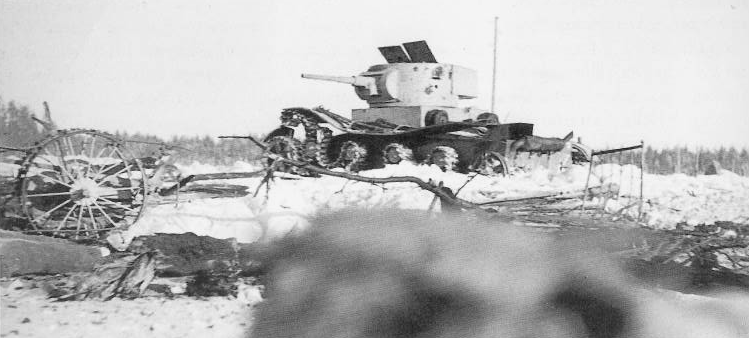
Soviet T-26 tank destroyed by a Finnish satchel charge during the Winter War

More than 50 different modifications and experimental vehicles based on the chassis of the T-26 light infantry tank were developed in the USSR in the 1930s, with 23 modifications going into series production. The majority were armoured combat vehicles: flame tanks, artillery tractors, radio-controlled tanks (teletanks), military engineering vehicles, self-propelled guns and armoured personnel carriers. Flame-throwing tanks formed around 12% of the series production of T-26 light tanks. The abbreviation "OT" (Ognemetniy Tank which stands for Flame-throwing Tank) appeared only in post-war literature; these tanks were originally called "KhT" (Khimicheskiy Tank which stands for Chemical Tank), or BKhM (Boevaya Khimicheskaya Mashina; Fighting Chemical Vehicle) in the documents of the 1930s. All chemical (flame-throwing) tanks based on the T-26 chassis (KhT-26, KhT-130, KhT-133) were designated BKhM-3. The vehicles were intended for area chemical contamination, smoke screens and for flame-throwing.

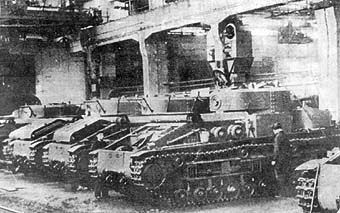
Production of the T-28

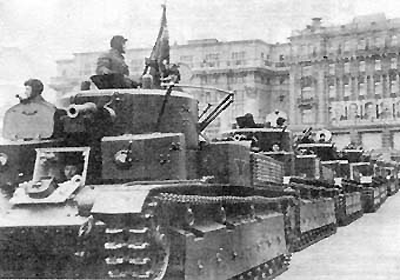
The multi-turreted T-28 medium tank. The T-28 was the first series-produced modern medium tank.

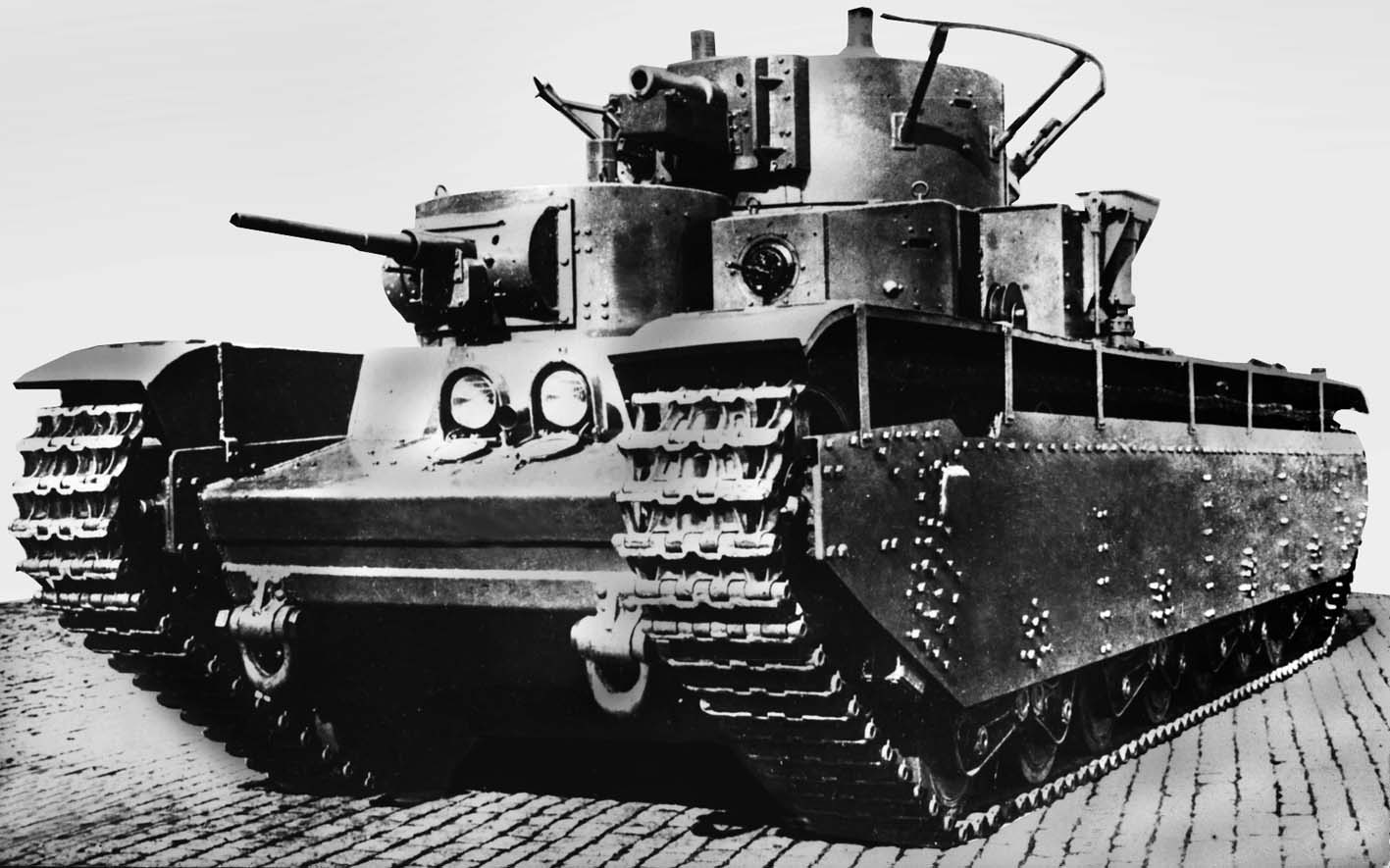
T-35 tank

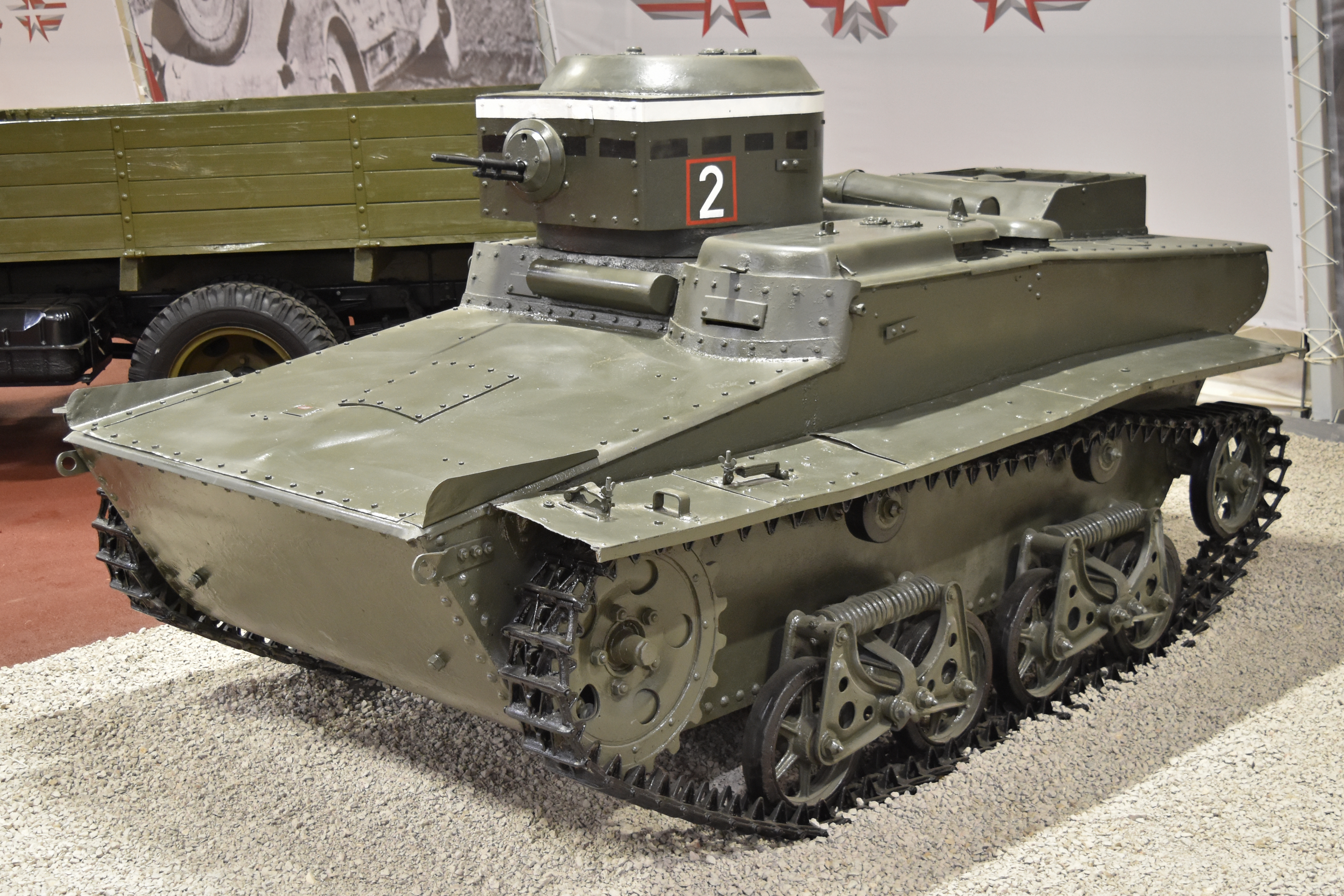
T-37А amphibious tank.

The Soviets purchased some U.S. Christie M1930 tank prototypes, from which they developed the BT series of fast tanks. They also developed the heavier multi-turreted T-28 medium tank and the massive T-35 (also multi-turreted), which followed the design premise of the experimental Vickers A1E1 Independent produced by Vickers for the British but not adopted. The T-28 was also greatly influenced by the A1E1 Independent. The Kirov Factory in Leningrad began manufacturing the T-28 tank in 1932. The T-28 tank was officially approved on August 11, 1933. The T-28 had one large turret with a 76.2 mm gun and two smaller turrets with 7.62 mm machine guns. A total of 503 T-28 tanks were manufactured over a period of eight years from 1933 to 1941. The Soviets also built a variant of the Carden Loyd tankette, bought under license from the United Kingdom in 1930, as a reconnaissance vehicle.

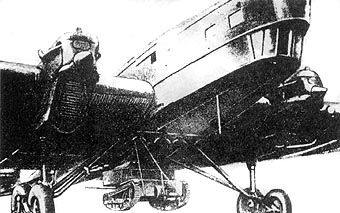
A TB-3 bomber carrying a T-27

The Soviets were not fully satisfied with the Carden Loyd design and made a number of changes before putting it into mass production under the designation of T-27. Compared with the British original, the hull was larger, the running gear was improved and the weapon mount was modified to take a Soviet-built 7.62 mm DT machine gun. The tankette was accepted into service on February 13, 1931 and the principal use of the T-27 during its service life was as a reconnaissance vehicle and was used in the Soviet republics of Central Asia during the 1930s, where the tankettes were used in campaigns against basmachis. However, they fairly quickly became obsolete due to the introduction of more advanced tanks. The tankette was also intended to be air-mobile. In 1935, the Soviets experimented with transporting T-27s by air, by suspending them under the fuselages of Tupolev TB-3 bombers.

In April 1931, Vickers-Armstrongs conducted several successful tests of light, floating tanks in the presence of the press. Those early models were developed into prototypes by Carden-Loyd Tractors, Ltd., which attracted the attention of the Department of Motorization and Mechanization of the RKKA (UMMRKKA), because the small tank suited well to the new armament policies of the Red Army, as well as possibly being able to replace the older T-27 tankette. Soviet engineers went over the prototype and later were able to purchase some and the "Selezen’" ("Drake", Ru. "Селезень") program was established in order to construct a similar amphibious tank with a layout based on that of the British prototype. The T-33, was built in March 1932 and showed good buoyancy during testing. However, the T-33 did not perform satisfactorily in other tests. They continue the development for a more suitable amphibious tank, and they designated their latest model as the T-37. Even before the end of 1932, the high command of the Red Army was planning to order 30 T-37As as they were now designated, but problems plagued production, and only 126 T-37As had been produced by 1 January 1934. The tank was mass-produced starting in 1933 up until 1936, when it was replaced with the more modern T-38. Overall, after four years of production, 2552 T-37As were produced, including the original prototypes. In the Red Army, they were used to perform tasks in communication, reconnaissance, and as defence units on the march, as well as active infantry support on the battlefield. The T-37A were used in large numbers during the Soviet invasion of Poland and in the Winter War against Finland. Also the T-41 amphibious tank was also produced, with the chassis, in part, borrowed from the T-33, and the caterpillar tracks entirely from the T-27 tank.

The multi-turreted T-35 heavy tank also showed flaws; Soviet tank designers started drawing up replacements. The T-35 conformed to the 1920s notion of a 'breakthrough tank' with very heavy firepower and armour protection, but poor mobility. The Spanish Civil War demonstrated the need for much heavier armour on tanks, and was the main influence on Soviet tank design just prior to World War II.

Of the tanks produced between 1930 and 1940, 97% were either identical copies of foreign designs, or very closely related improvements. Significantly, the major improvement the Soviet designers made to these foreign designs was an increase in firepower.

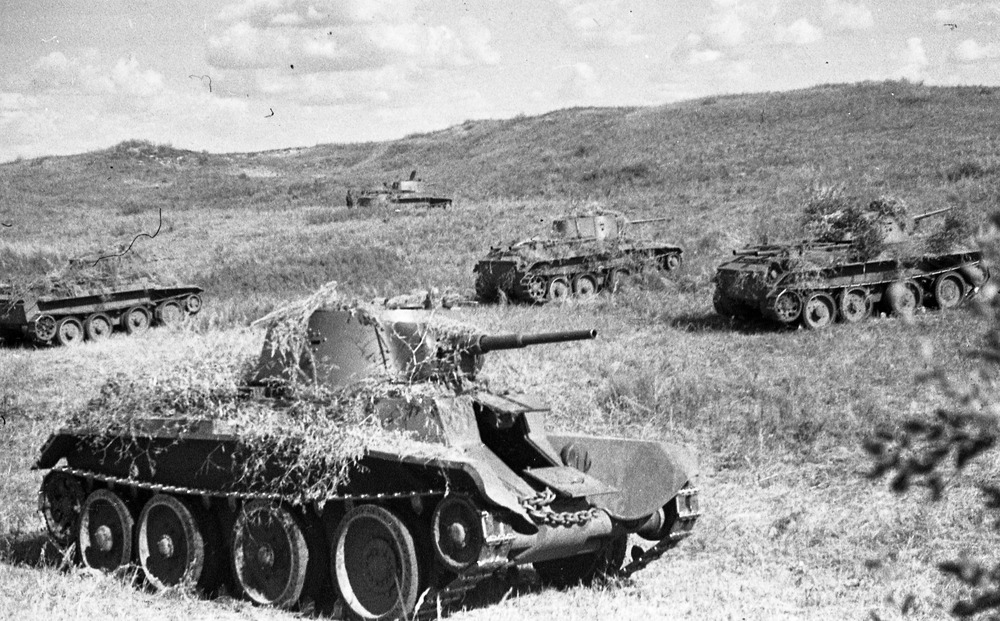
BT-7 tanks

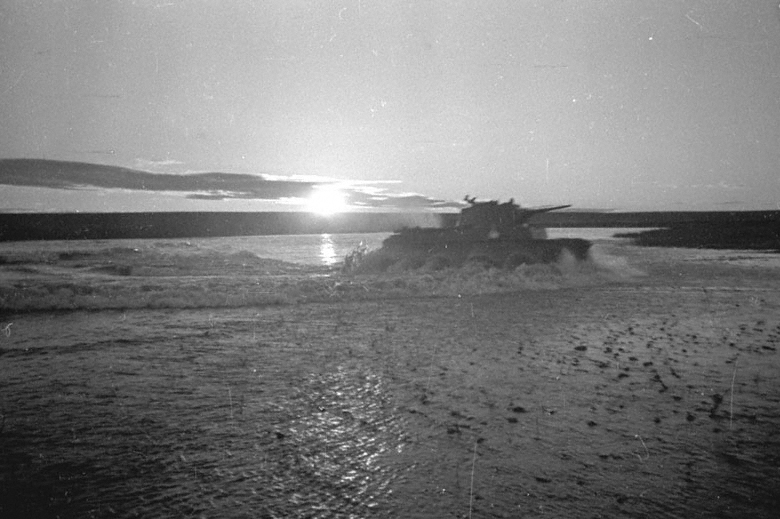
USSR BT-7 tank crosses Khalkhyn Gol river

BT-7M on wheels

By 1935, the Red Army "... possessed more armoured vehicles, and more tank units than the rest of the world combined." But from 1937 to 1941, the Red Army's officer corps, the armour design bureaux, and leadership of the factories were gutted by Stalin's Great Purge. Approximately 54,000 officers were repressed. Military knowledge completely stagnated and armoured vehicle production dropped drastically (though still remaining the world's largest). Training and readiness dropped to very low levels. This repression continued until the eve of the war.

The Soviet–Japanese border conflicts (1935-1939) over the border in Manchuria gave the Soviets a chance to employ tactics with their armoured forces which were to prove useful in the coming war, when General Georgy Zhukov deployed approximately 50,000 Soviet and Mongolian troops of the 57th Special Corps to hold the center of the line on the east bank of the Battle of Khalkhyn Gol, then crossed the river on with BT-7 tanks and armoured units, massed artillery, and air cover. Once the Japanese were pinned down by the advance of the Soviet center units, the tanks and armoured units swept around the flanks and attacked the Japanese in the rear, achieving a classic double envelopment, allowing the two wings of Zhukov's armoured units to link up, surrounding and trapping the Japanese 23rd division. The battle ended with the complete destruction of the Japanese forces, using tactics that Zhukov would employ later with his tanks against German forces.

However, during the Battle of Khalkhin Gol, BT tanks proved vulnerable to Japanese close quarter teams (tank killer squads) which were armed with "Molotov cocktails" (fire bottles). The Soviet BT-5 and BT-7 light tanks, which had been operating in 100-degree-plus heat on the Mongolian plains, easily caught fire when a Molotov cocktail ignited their gasoline engines. General Zhukov made it one of his points when briefing Stalin, that his "...BT tanks were a bit fireprone..."

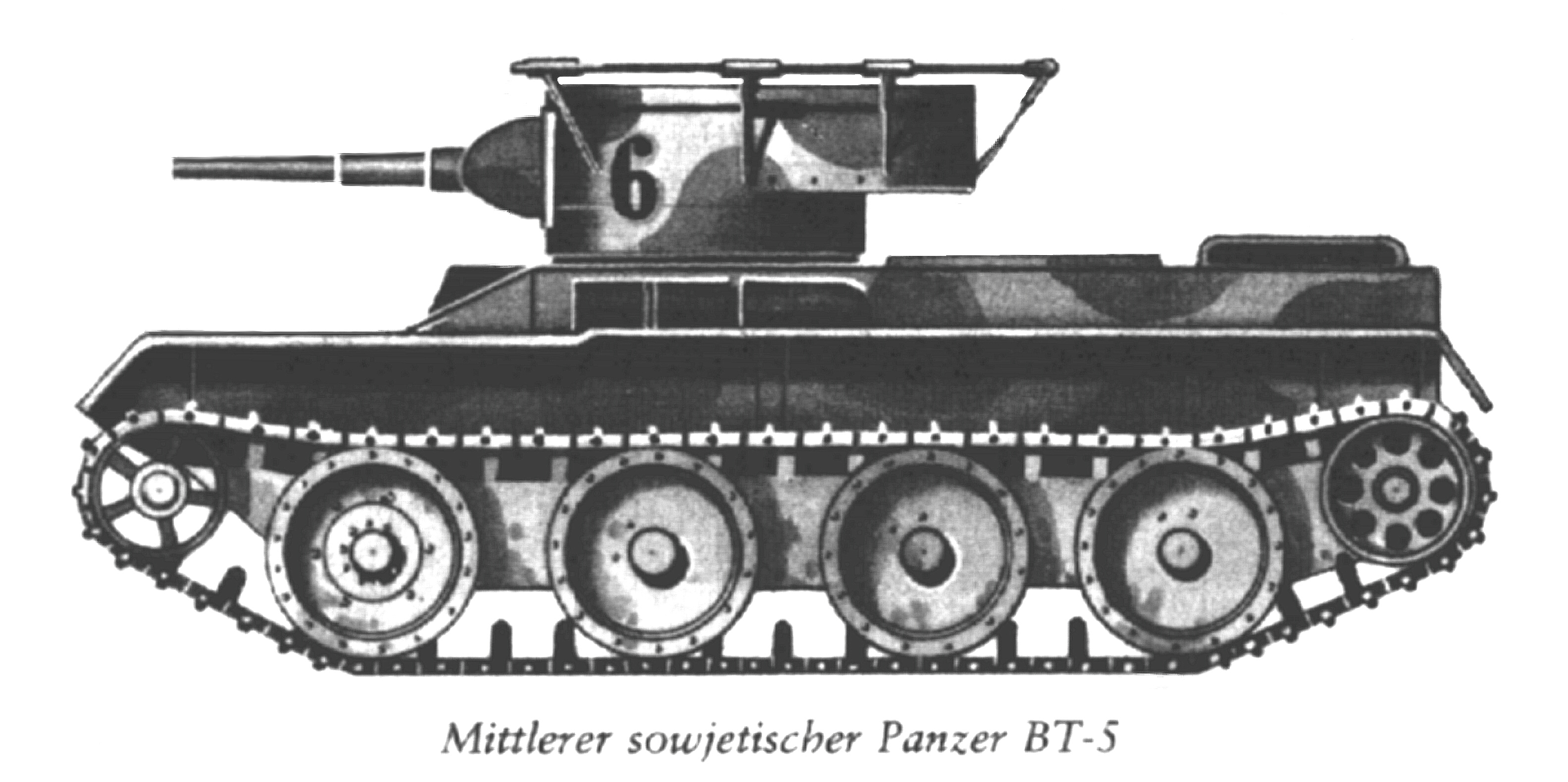
The BT-5 light Tank; the BT series led to the development of the T-34.

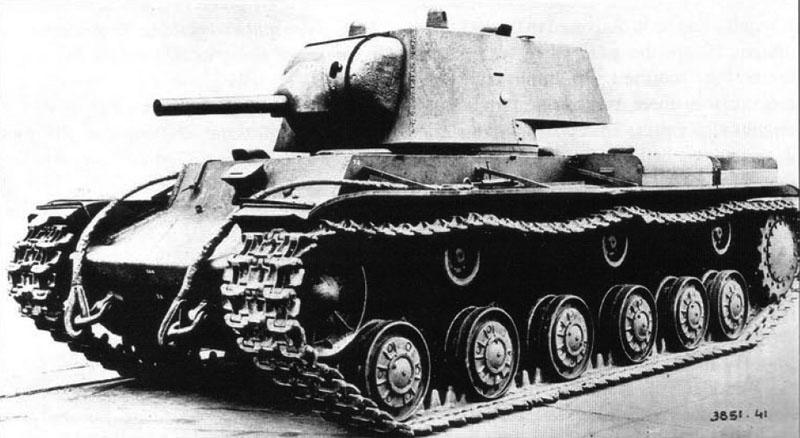
KV-1 model 1939

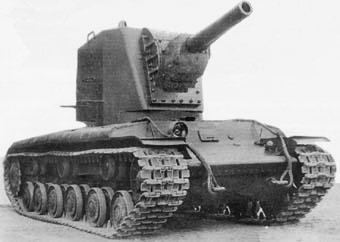
The KV-2 heavy artillery tank

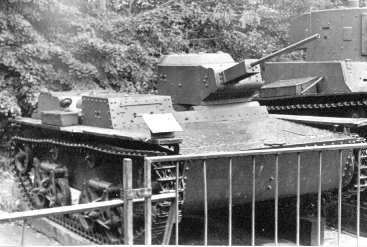
T-38 amphibious scout tank armed with 20 mm cannon

One of the main competing designs of the T-35 tank was the SMK, which lowered the number of turrets from the T-35's five to two, mounting the same combination of 76.2 mm and 45 mm weapons. When two prototypes were ordered though, it was decided to create one with only a single turret, but more armour. This new single-turret tank was the KV. The smaller hull and single turret enabled the designer to install heavy frontal and turret armour while keeping the weight within manageable limits.

==== World War II ====
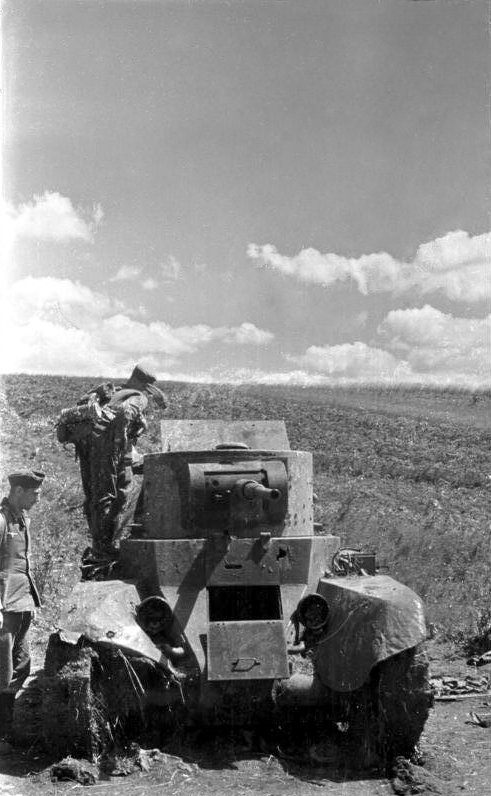
German soldiers examining an abandoned Soviet BT tank

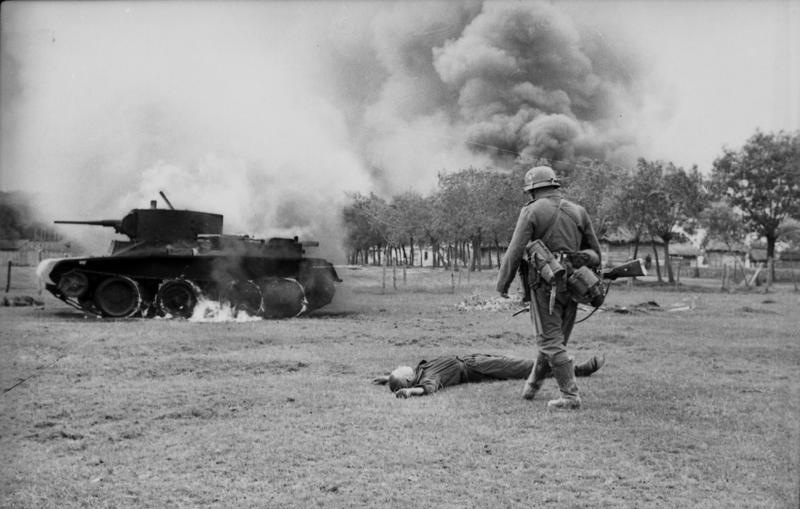
June 1941 German infantryman in front of fallen Russian tank soldier and burning BT-7 light tank in the southern Soviet Union during the early days of Operation Barbarossa

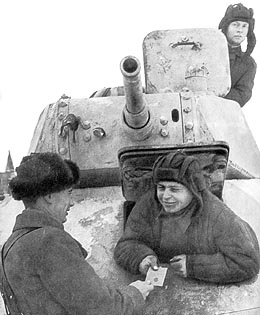
Up close with T-50 light tank

The participation by Soviet 'volunteer' tank units in the Spanish Civil War was decisive in forming Soviet tank designs for World War II. Soviet tanks dominated their foreign rivals in Spain due to their firepower, but their thin armour, in common with most tanks of the period, made them vulnerable to the new towed antitank guns being supplied to infantry units. This finding led directly to a new generation of Soviet tanks. In 1939 the most numerous Soviet tank models were the T-26 light tank, and the BT series of fast tanks.

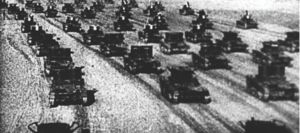
Tanks T-26 (1933 built with two turrets) from 133 th Brigade of the 45 th Mechanized Corps (Kyiv military district). "Big Kiev maneuvers". September 1935. Note the white stripe on some turrets.

On the eve of World War II, the Red Army had around 8,500 T-26s of all variants. The T-26 was a slow-moving light tank intended for infantry support, originally designed to keep pace with soldiers on the ground. The BT tanks were fast-moving light tanks designed to fight other tanks but not infantry. Both were thinly armoured, proof against small arms but not anti-tank rifles and 37 mm anti-tank guns, and their gasoline-fuelled engines (commonly used in tank designs throughout the world in those days) were liable to burst into flames "at the slightest provocation." Development of various tank designs to find a replacement was begun, such as the T-50 light tank which was intended to replace the T-26 infantry tank. In prewar planning, the T-50 was intended to become the most numerous Soviet tank, operating alongside the BT light tank. The sophisticated T-50 was developed keeping in mind the experience gained in the Winter War and Soviet tests of the German Panzer III tank. But because of technical problems, only a total of 69 T-50 tanks were built (only 48 of them armed), and the much simpler T-60 light tanks replaced it. In the meantime, a replacement for the BT light tanks was being designed which would develop into the very capable and economical T-34 medium tank.

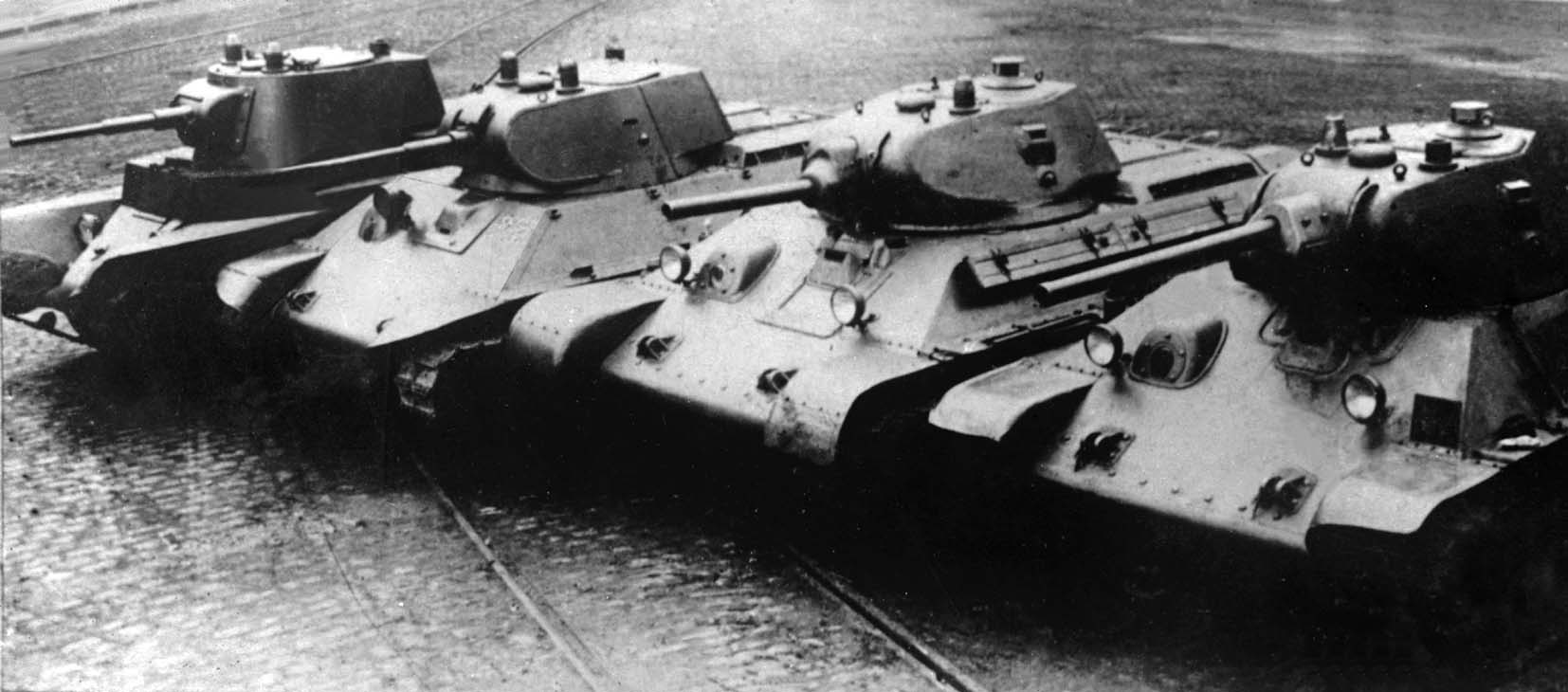
A-8 (BT-7M), A-20, T-34 Model 1940 and Model 1941

In 1937, the Red Army assigned the engineer Mikhail Koshkin to lead a new team to design a replacement for the BT tanks at the Kharkiv Komintern Locomotive Plant (KhPZ) in Kharkiv. The prototype tank, designated A-20, was specified with 20 millimetres (0.8 in) of armour, a 45 mm (1.8 in) gun, and the new model V-2 engine, using less-flammable diesel fuel in a V12 configuration. The A-20 incorporated previous research (BT-IS and BT-SW-2 projects) into sloped armour: its all-round sloped armour plates were more likely to deflect anti-armour rounds than perpendicular armour. Koshkin convinced Soviet leader Joseph Stalin to let him develop a second prototype, a more heavily armed and armoured "universal tank" which could replace both the T-26 and the BT tanks.

The second prototype Koshkin named A-32, after its 32 millimetres (1.3 in) of frontal armour. It also had a 76.2 mm (3 in) gun, and the same model V-2 diesel engine. Both were tested in field trials at Kubinka in 1939, and the heavier A-32 proved to be as mobile as the A-20. A still heavier version of the A-32 with 45 millimetres (1.8 in) of front armour and wider tracks was approved for production as the T-34. Resistance from the military command and concerns about high production cost were finally overridden by anxieties about the poor performance of Soviet tanks in Finland and the effectiveness of Germany's Blitzkrieg in France, and the first production tanks were completed in September 1940, completely replacing the production of the T-26, BT, and the multi-turreted T-28 medium tank at the KhPZ.

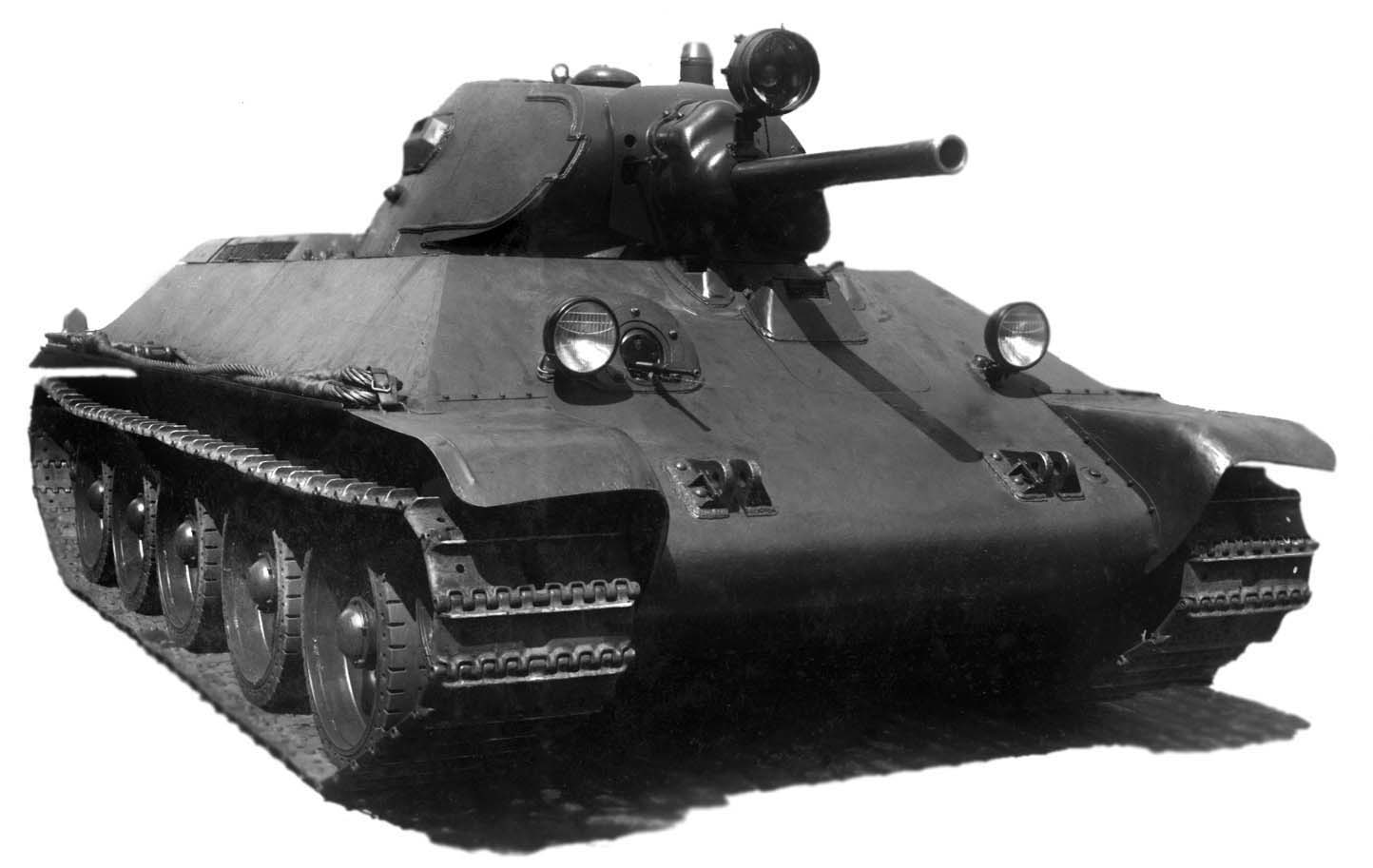
The original T-34 Model 1940 - recognizable by the low-slung barrel of the L-11 gun below a bulge in the mantlet housing its recoil mechanism. This pre-production A-34 prototype vehicle has a complex single-piece hull front.

The T-28 medium tank was deployed in the Invasion of Poland and later during the Winter War against Finland. In the course of these operations it was found that the armour was inadequate and programs were initiated to upgrade it. According to Russian historian M. Kolomietz's book T-28. Three-headed Stalin's Monster, over 200 T-28s were knocked out during the Winter War. Frontal plates were upgraded from 50 mm to 80 mm and side and rear plates to 40 mm thickness. With this up-armoured version, the Red Army broke through the main Finnish defensive fortification, the vaunted Mannerheim Line. The Soviets thus began to upgrade their T-28 tanks for the coming war with Germany, but many were still lost during the first two months of the invasion, when the Germans invaded in June 1941.

When the Soviets entered the Winter War, the SMK, KV and a third design, the T-100, were sent to be tested in combat conditions. The heavy armour of the KV proved highly resistant to Finnish anti-tank weapons, making it more effective than the other designs. It was soon put into production, both as the original 76 mm-armed KV-1 heavy tank and the 152 mm howitzer-mounting assault gun, the KV-2 Heavy Artillery Tank. The Soviets also committed the T-38 amphibious scout tank, which was a Soviet light amphibious tank and a development of the earlier T-37, based in turn on the French AMR 33 light reconnaissance tank. The tank served with the Red Army in the Winter War with Finland in 1940, but was unsuccessful due to its light armament and thin armour, which was easily penetrated by rifle and light machine gun fire. In the confined terrain of Finland, the tank was a death trap. As a scout tank, the T-38 had the advantages of very low silhouette and good mobility, due to its ability to swim. However, the thin armour and single machine gun armament made the tank of only limited use in combat while the lack of radios in most T-38s was a serious limitation in a recon vehicle. The T-38's limitations were recognized, and it would have been replaced by the T-40, but the outbreak of the Second World War meant that only a few T-40s were produced. The T-38 was rarely seen in direct combat after Germany attacked in 1941 and was mostly relegated to other roles such as artillery tractor, and the main amphibious scout vehicle of the Red Army became the Ford GPA amphibious jeep, an open unarmoured vehicle provided through Lend-Lease.

By the eve of Operation Barbarossa in 1941, the Soviet Union had some of the world's best tanks (including the KV-1, which were basically a generation ahead, coming as a shock to the Wehrmacht). However, it still had many older tanks in its front-line armoured forces, with the T-26 forming the backbone of the Red Army's armoured forces during the first months of the German invasion of the Soviet Union in 1941. In overall tanks, however, the Soviet numerical advantage was considerable as the Red Army had a large quantitative superiority. It possessed 23,106 tanks, of which about 12,782 were in the five Western Military Districts (three of which directly faced the German invasion front). However, maintenance and readiness standards were very poor; ammunition and radios were in short supply, and many units lacked the trucks needed for resupply beyond their basic fuel and ammunition loads.

Also, from 1938, the Soviets had partly dispersed their tanks to infantry divisions for infantry support, but after their experiences in the Winter War and their observation of the German campaign against France, had begun to emulate the Germans and organize most of their armoured assets into large armour divisions and corps. This reorganization was only partially implemented at the dawn of Barbarossa, as not enough tanks were available to bring the mechanized corps up to organic strength. Tank units were rarely well-equipped, and also lacked training and logistical support. Maintenance standards were very poor. Units were sent into combat with no arrangements for refuelling, ammunition resupply, or personnel replacement. Often, after a single engagement, units were destroyed or rendered ineffective. The poor training and readiness status of most Red Army units led to a catastrophic defeat of the enormous Soviet Mechanised Corps during the opening phases of Operation Barbarossa, Germany's 1941 invasion of the Soviet Union. Despite their generally good equipment, the Red Army's operational capabilities and motorised logistic support were very inferior. The Soviet numerical advantage in heavy equipment was also more than offset by the greatly superior training and readiness of German forces. The Soviet officer corps and high command had been decimated by Stalin's Great Purge (1936–1938).

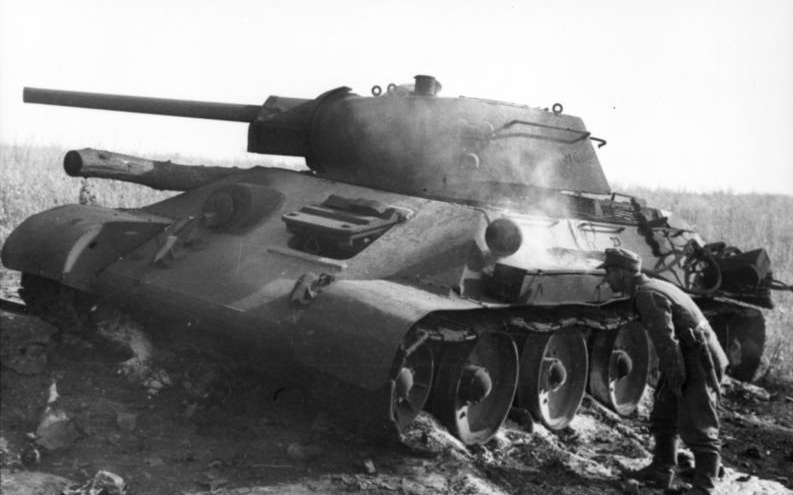
A T-34 destroyed at the Battle of Prokhorovka, 1943.

The German Wehrmacht had about 5,200 tanks overall, of which 3,350 were committed to the invasion. This yields a balance of immediately available tanks of about 4:1 in the Red Army's favour. The T-34 was the most modern in the world, and the KV series the best armoured. The most advanced Soviet tank models, however, the T-34 and KV-1, were not available in large numbers early in the war, and only accounted for 7.2% of the total Soviet tank force. But while these 1,861 modern tanks were technically superior to the 1,404 German medium Panzer III and IV tanks, the Soviets in 1941 still lacked the communications, training and experience to employ such weapons effectively.

The Soviet Union had also built some of the best amphibious tanks as amphibious capability was important to the Red Army, as evidenced by the production of over 1,500 amphibious tanks in the 1930s. It built the T-37 and T-38 tank light amphibians and then the T-40 which was intended to replace them. The T-40 was a superior design, armed with a 12.7 mm DShK heavy machine gun, a much more potent weapon than the 7.62 mm DT machine gun mounted on the T-38. But due to the pressures of war, the Soviets favoured the production of simpler tank designs, and only a small number of T-40s were built.

The T-40 entered production just prior to the outbreak of war, and was intended to equip reconnaissance units. As the need for large numbers of tanks became critical, a secondary non-amphibious variant was designed on the T-40 chassis. This design became the T-60. The T-60 was simpler, cheaper, and better armed, and could fulfil most of the same roles. Under the stress of war, production of the T-40 was halted in favour of the T-60. Despite that, T-40 with thicker armor and TNSh cannon, unable to float, was produced along the T-60 in smaller numbers for more smooth conveyor belt transition, this tank was also named as T-60, but is often referred to as "T-40" T-60 to avoid confusion. Thus only 356 T-40s were issued, compared to 594 "T-40" T-60 and over 6,000 true T-60s. Although at first intended to carry a 12.7 mm machine gun like the T-40, the "T-40" T-60 scout tank armament was later upgraded to the 20 mm TNSh cannon, a tank version of the ShVAK, "true" T-60 had TNSh from beginning.

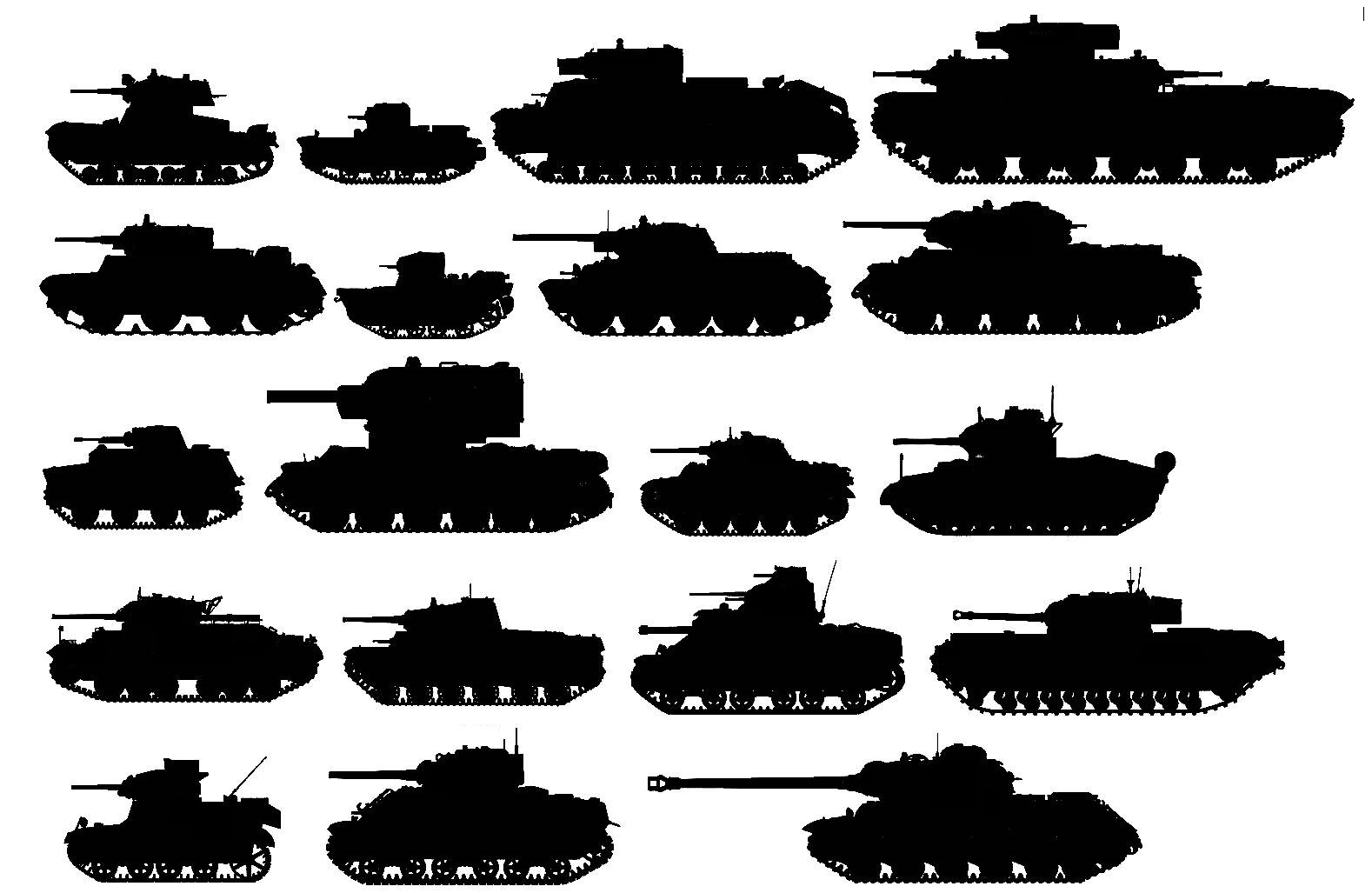
all tanks operated by the USSR during WW2

By 1942, light tanks such as the T-60 were considered inadequate by the Red Army, unable to keep up with the T-34 medium tank and unable to penetrate the armour of most German tanks, but they could be produced by small factories which were unable to handle the large components of medium and heavy tanks. The T-70 was an attempt to remedy some of the shortcomings of the T-60 scout tank, which had very poor cross-country mobility, thin armour, and an inadequate 20 mm gun. The T-70 light tank had a 45 mm L/46 gun Model 38 with forty-five rounds carried, and a coaxial 7.62 mm DT machine gun and was used by the Red Army to replace both the T-60 scout tank for reconnaissance and the T-50 light infantry tank for infantry support.

The T-70 was then replaced with the T-80 light tank, a more robust version of the T-70 with a two-man turret. But there was enough lend-lease equipment available to fulfil the reconnaissance role of the light tanks, and armoured cars were better suited for light scouting and liaison. All light tank production was cancelled in October 1943, after only about 75 T-80s were built. No further light tanks would be built during the war. In November 1943 Red Army tank units were reorganized: light tanks were replaced by the T-34 and new T-34-85, which started production the following month.

At the outset of the war, T-34 tanks amounted to only about four percent of the Soviet tank arsenal, but by the war's end, they comprised at least 55% of the USSR's massive output of tanks (based on figures from; Zheltov 2001 lists even larger numbers). During the winter of 1941–42, the T-34 dominated German tanks through its ability to move over deep mud or snow without bogging down, where German tanks could not. The Panzer IV used an inferior leaf-spring suspension and narrow track, and tended to sink in deep mud or snow. However, by the time the T-34 had replaced older models and became available in greater numbers, newer German tanks, including the improved Panzer V "Panther", outperformed it. In early 1944, an upgraded tank, the T-34-85, gave the Red Army a tank with better armour and mobility than German Panzer IV and Sturmgeschütz III, but it could not match the Panther in gun or armour protection. To the Soviet advantage there were far fewer Panthers than T-34s, and the T-34-85 was good enough to allow skilled crew and tactical situations to tip the balance.

Soviet T-34 tanks near Odessa during liberation of Ukraine

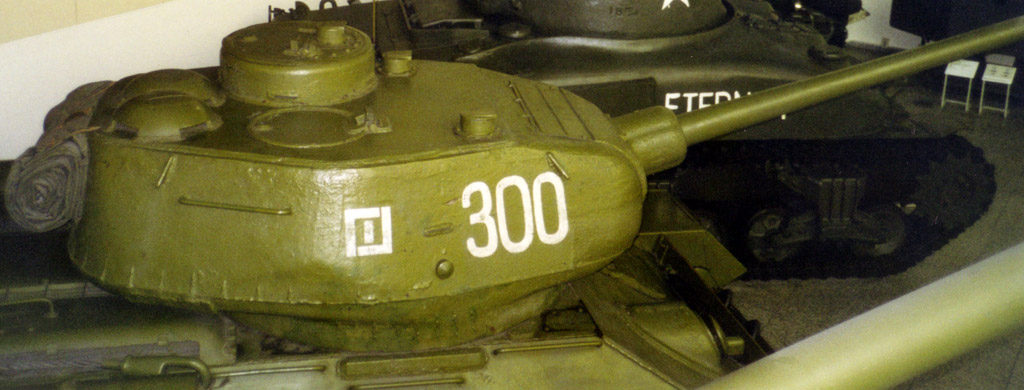
Turret of the T-34-85, with commander's cupola allowing all-round vision (introduced partway through the production run of the T-34 Model 1943).

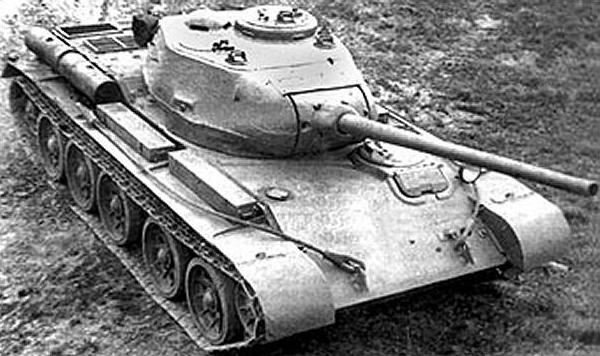
Second generation T-44-85 prototype during trials. Notice that this one does not have the splashboard.

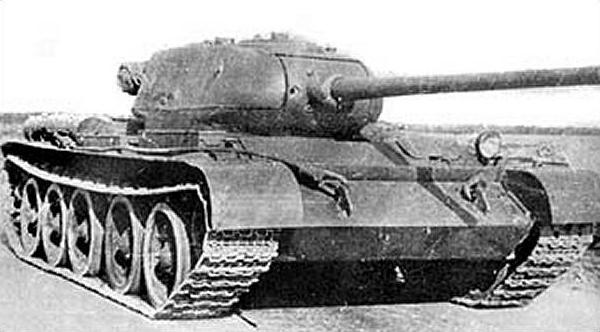
Second generation T-44-85 prototype during trials at NIBT proving grounds near Kubinka, summer 1944

However, in the autumn of 1943 the design bureau of the Stalin Ural Tank Factory No. 183, located in Nizhny Tagil (in the Ural Mountains), started working on a vehicle that would have improvement opportunities in the future, under a direct order from Stalin. The intention was to retain the high mobility of the T-34 and provide it with heavier armour protection against modern tank guns. In November 1943, the chief designer, A. A. Morozov, presented the overall design of the vehicle and a model of the tank, which received the designation T-44 (Ob'yekt 136). It had a significant decrease in the length of the engine compartment allowed the turret to be moved rearwards, which in turn moved its rotation axis and the center of mass to the center of the hull, increased the accuracy of the main gun and decreased a chance that the turret could get stuck after getting hit in the turret ring with a projectile that ricocheted. The thickness of the frontal armor protection more than doubled without disturbing the center of mass or drastically increasing the weight of the tank.

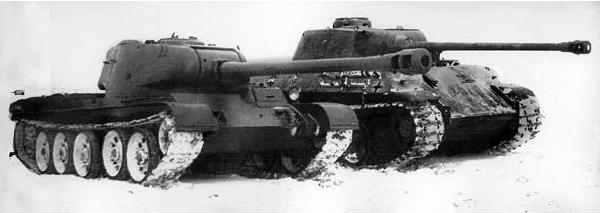
T-44-122 prototype during comparative trials against captured German Panther

The T-44 officially entered service with the Red Army on 23 November 1944 but the production started in October. The original plans were that the factory would produce 300 T-44s a month. However, only 25 were built by the end of 1944. In 1945, 940 were built, making a total of 965 (190 tanks built in 1944 and 1945 were completed by the end of the war).

Even with its innovative technology and better armor protection, the T-44A still used an 85 mm ZiS-S-53 tank gun, the same as the one fitted on the T-34-85 medium tank. The army needed a new tank armed with a more powerful 100 mm gun. Two projects were started, both based on the T-44A and the development of the first one started in October 1944, and the designing stage was completed in December. The prototype was ready in February 1945 and the trials conducted between March and April gave positive results and the vehicle entered service with the Red Army as the T-54.

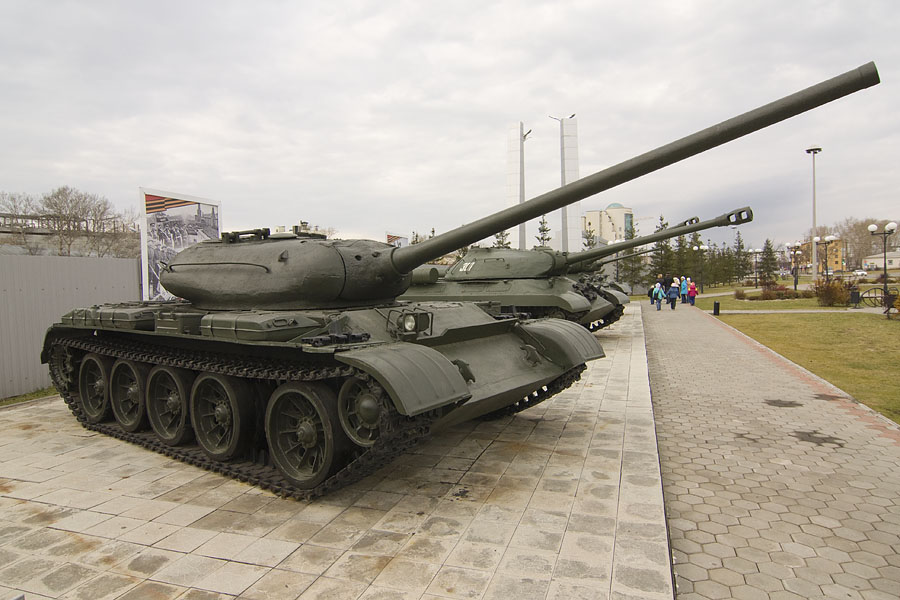
The original T-54-1 tank. It has a turret reminiscent of the T-34-85's, with prominent, undercut shot traps.

The tank had almost the same hull and drive train as the T-44A. Differences included thickened front armour (120 mm on the upper section and 90 mm on the lower section) and a different hatch and vision slot for the driver. The turret had increased diameter to 1800 mm. The armament included the 100 mm D-10TK tank gun as well as two 7.62 mm GWT machine guns. The tank was powered by a new V-54 12-cylinder 38.88-litre water-cooled diesel engine developing 520 hp (388 kW) at 2,000 rpm. The fuel capacity was increased (530 litres in the internal fuel tank and 165 litres in the external fuel tank). The weight was increased to 35.5 tonnes, which reduced the maximal road speed to 43.5 km/h. Further development of the T-44 was cancelled and all the attention was directed towards the development of the new T-54 main battle tank.

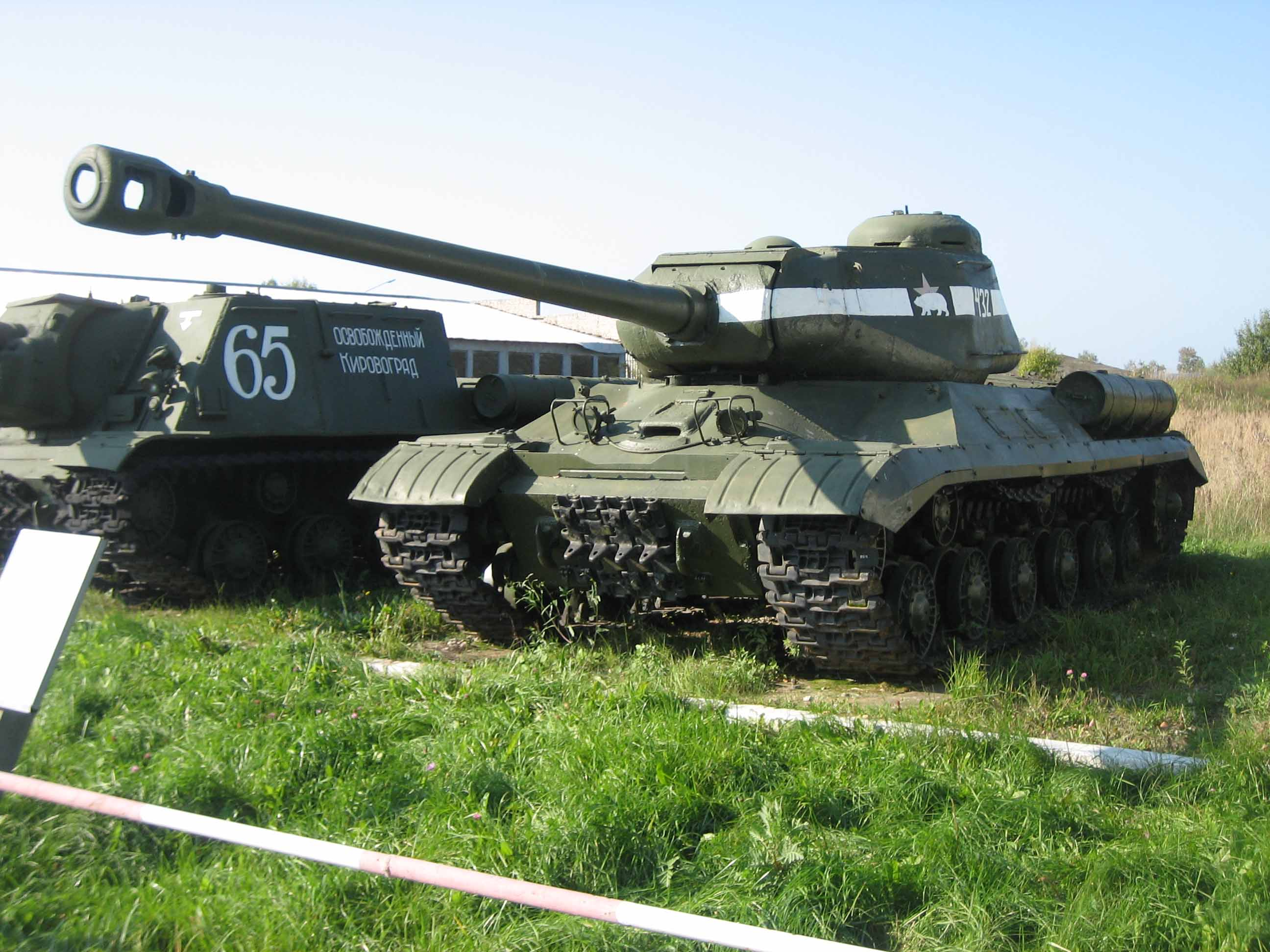
IS-2M at the Kubinka Tank Museum.

The IS Tank was a heavy tank series that replaced the KV-series during 1944 in World War II beginning with the IS-1(IS-85 or just IS) tank. The heavy tanks were designed with thick armor to counter German 88 mm guns and carried a main gun capable of defeating Tiger II, Tiger I, and Panther tanks. They were mainly designed as breakthrough tanks, firing a heavy high-explosive shell that was useful against entrenchments and bunkers.

The IS-2 saw combat late in World War II in small numbers, notably against Tiger I, Tiger II tanks and Elefant tank destroyers. Then the next in the series, the IS-3, saw service on the Chinese-Soviet border, the Soviet invasion of Hungary, the Prague Spring and on both sides of the Six-Day War. However the mobility and firepower of medium-tanks and the evolution of the main battle tank rendered heavy tanks obsolete.

=== Lend Lease tanks ===
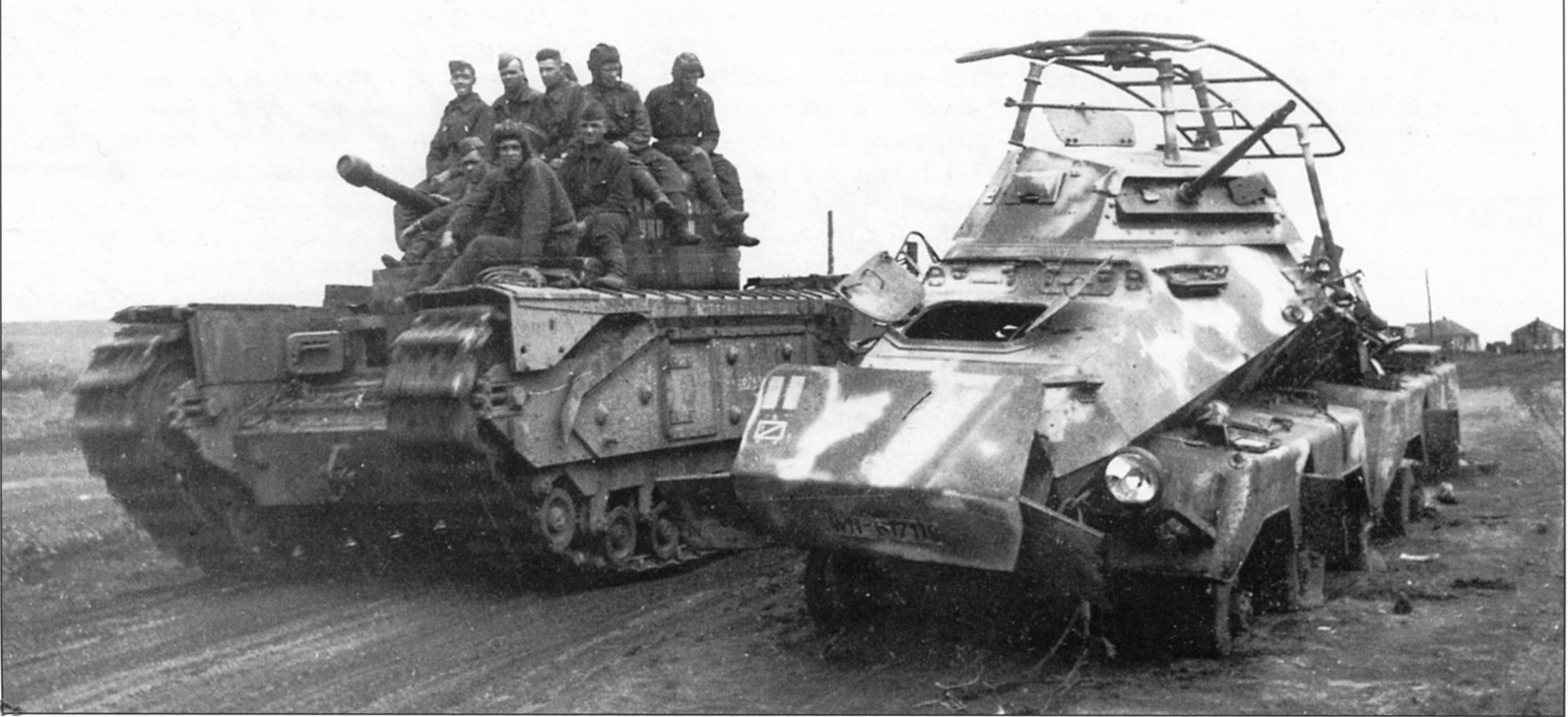
A Soviet Churchill Mk IV passes a knocked-out German Sd.Kfz 232 (8-Rad) armoured car at the fourth battle of Kharkov in 1943

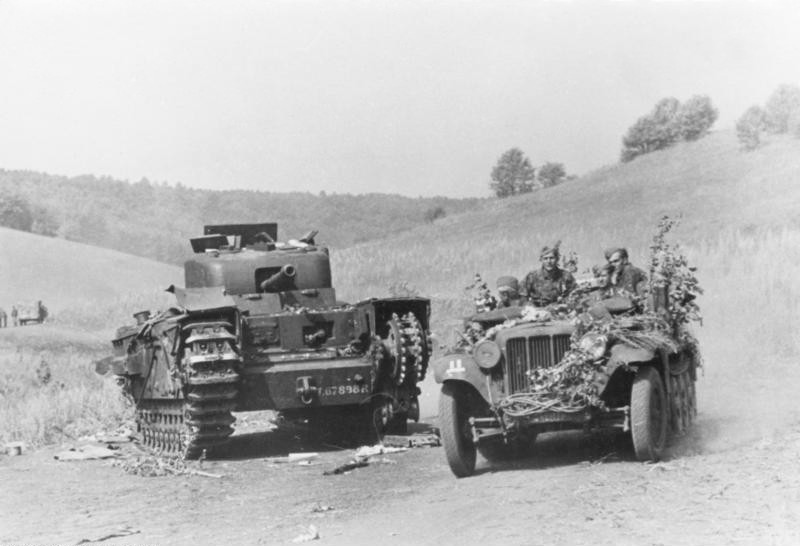
A Soviet Churchill Mk IV, 1943

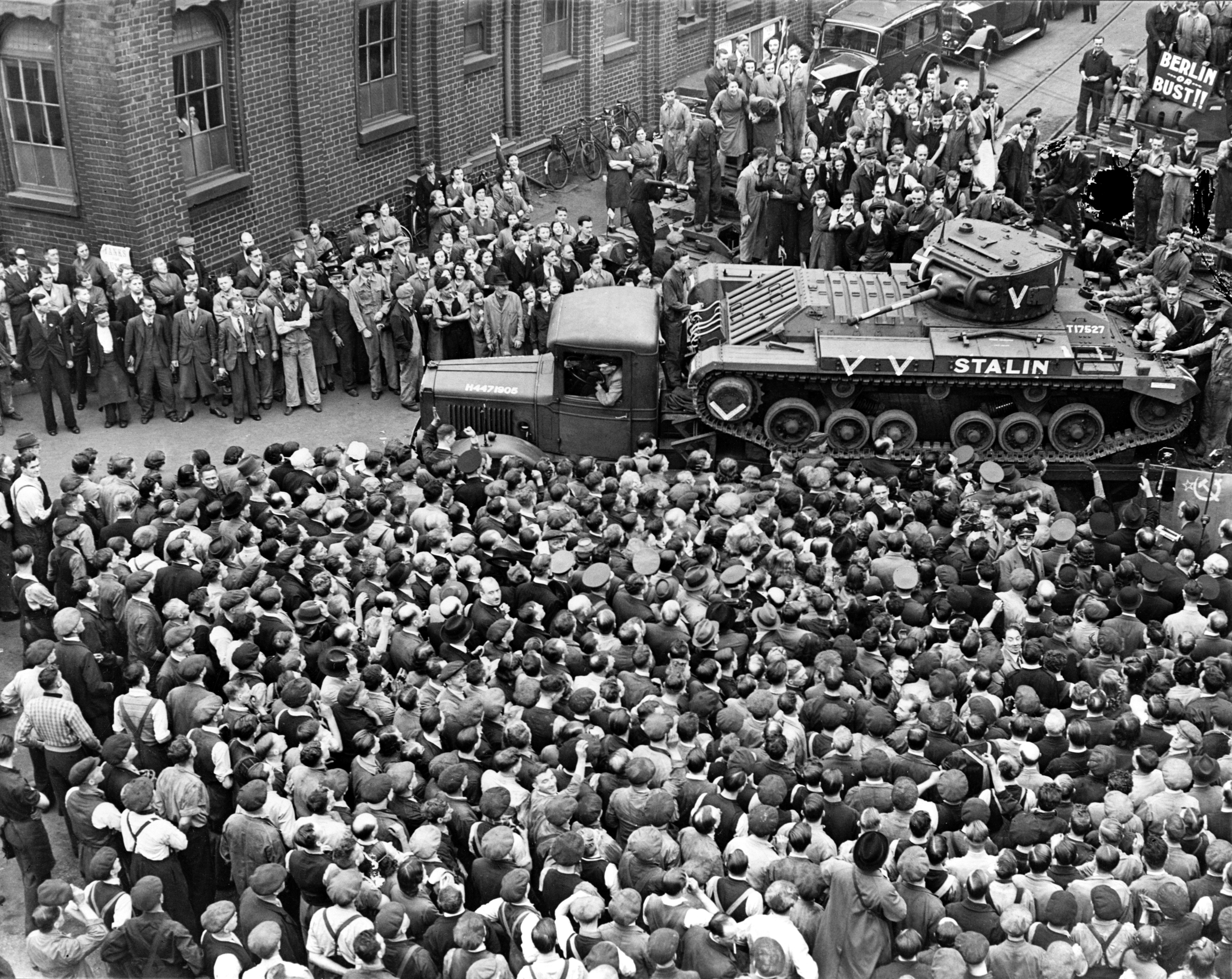
A Valentine tank destined for the Soviet Union leaves the factory in Britain.

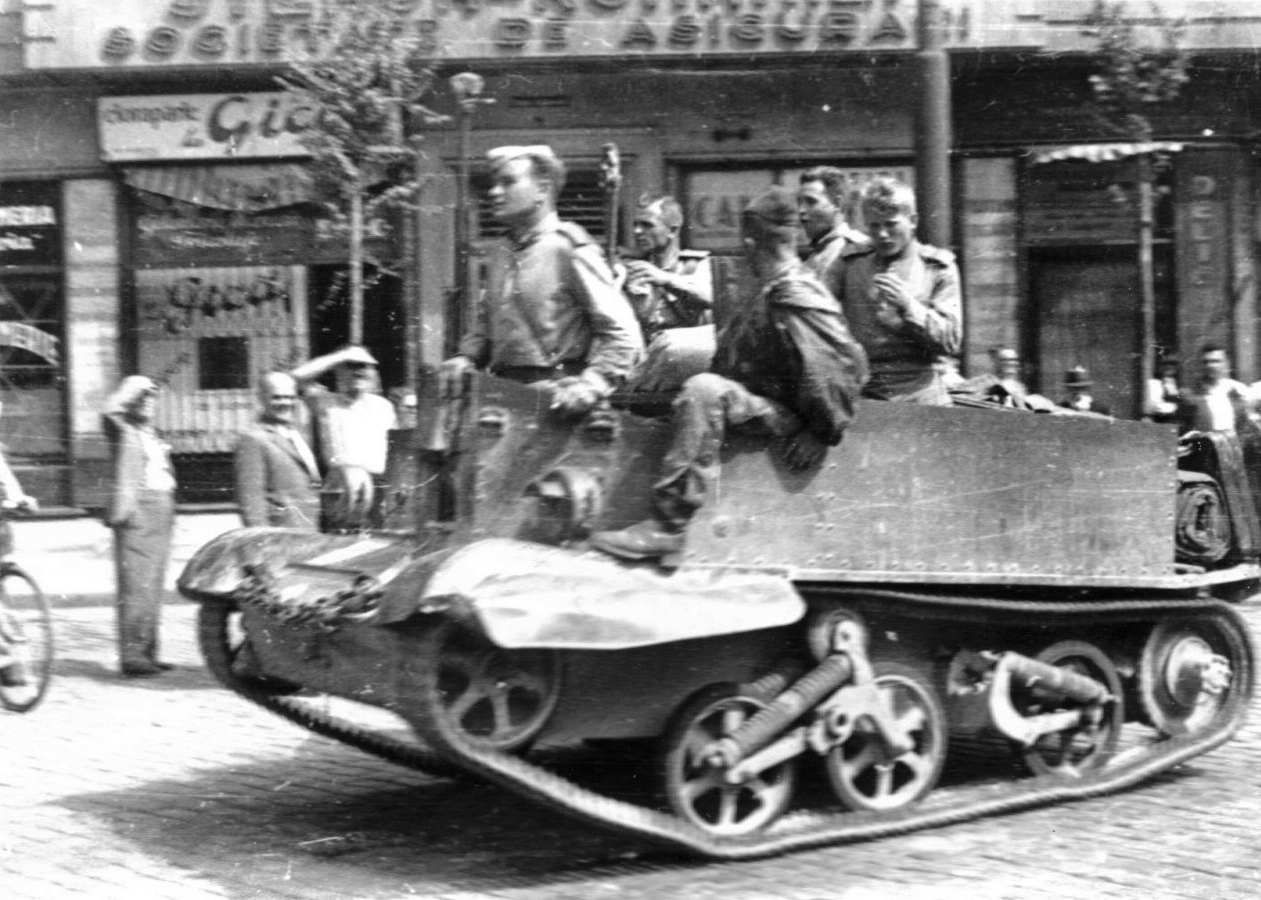
The Red Army in Bucharest near Boulevard of Carol I with British-supplied Universal Carrier

The Soviet Union also had Allied tanks from the British aid program, and the US Lend-Lease program, most which came via the Arctic Convoys. In June 1941, within weeks of the German invasion of the USSR, the first British aid convoy set off along the dangerous Arctic sea route to Murmansk, arriving in September. It carried 40 Hawker Hurricanes along with 550 mechanics and pilots of No. 151 Wing to provide immediate air defence of the port and to train Soviet pilots. The convoy was the first of many convoys to Murmansk and Arkhangelsk in what became known as the Arctic convoys, the returning ships carried the gold that the USSR was using to pay the US.

By the end of 1941, early shipments of Matilda, Valentine and Tetrarch tanks represented only 6.5% of total Soviet tank production but over 25% of medium and heavy tanks produced for the Red Army. The British tanks first saw action with the 138 Independent Tank Battalion in the Volga Reservoir on 20 November 1941. Lend-Lease tanks constituted 30 to 40 percent of heavy and medium tank strength before Moscow at the beginning of December 1941.

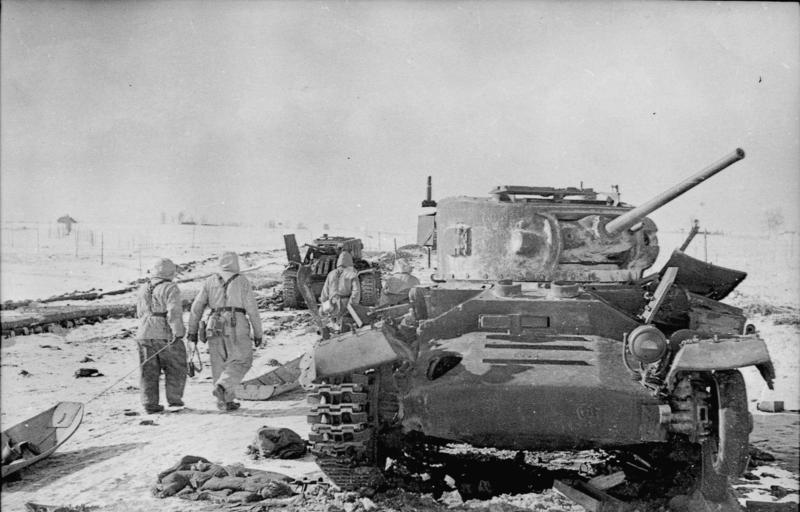
British Mk III 'Valentine' destroyed in the Soviet Union, January 1944

Significant numbers of British Churchill, Matilda and Valentine tanks were shipped to the USSR.

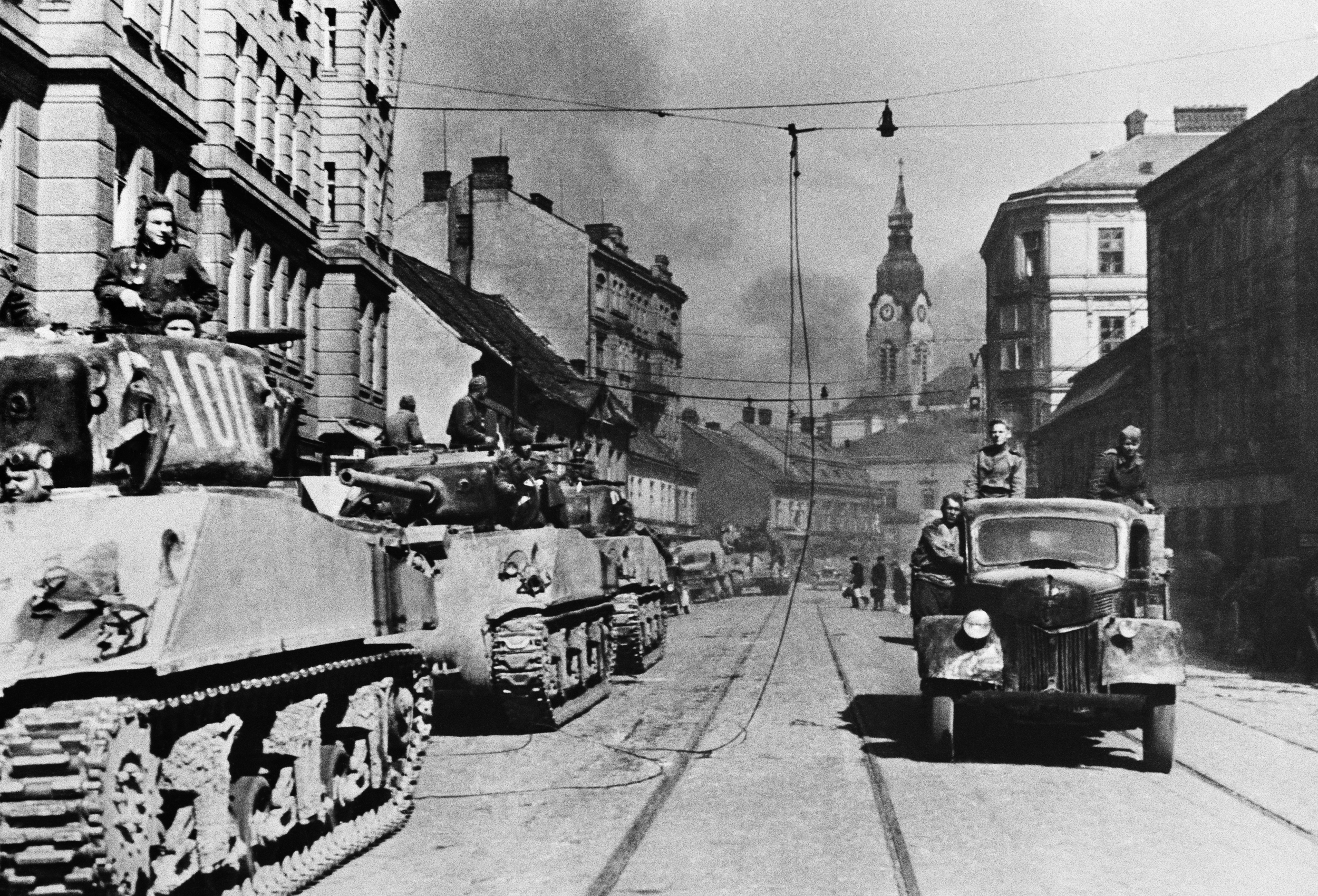
Soviet M4A2(76)W Shermans lined up on the side of a street in the Czech city of Brno in April of 1945.

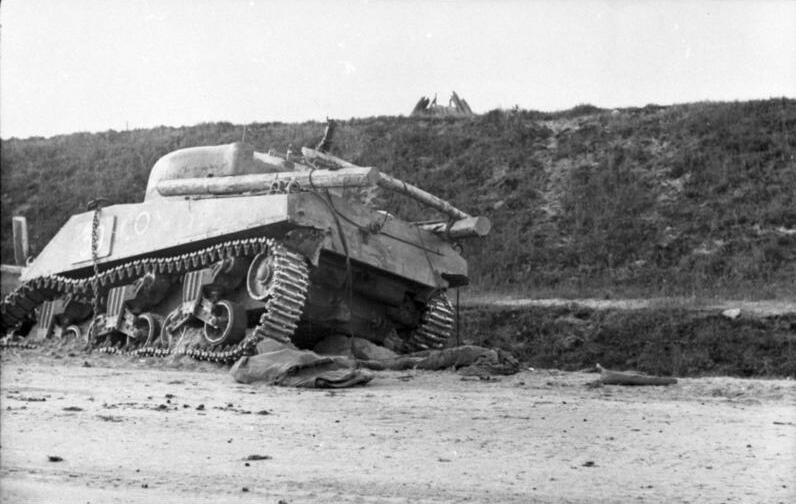
An abandoned Soviet M4A2 (75mm-gun version) left behind near Smolensk, just before the start of Operation Bagration in 1944.

The Soviet Union's nickname for the US M4 medium tank was Emcha, which was diminutive of Em chetyre ("M-four"). The M4A2s used by the Red Army were considered to be much-less prone to blow up due to ammunition detonation than their T-34/76 but had a higher tendency to overturn in road accidents and collisions or because of rough terrain due to their much-higher center of gravity.

Under Lend-Lease, 4,102 M4A2 medium tanks were sent to the Soviet Union. Of these, 2,007 were equipped with the original 75 mm main gun, with 2,095 mounting the more-capable 76 mm tank gun. The total number of Sherman tanks sent to the U.S.S.R. under Lend-Lease represented 18.6% of all Lend-Lease Shermans.

The first 76mm-armed M4A2 diesel-fuel Shermans started to arrive in Soviet Union in the late summer of 1944. By 1945, some Red Army armoured units were standardized to depend primarily on them and not on their ubiquitous T-34. Such units include the 1st Guards Mechanized Corps, the 3rd Guards Mechanized Corps and the 9th Guards Mechanized Corps, amongst others. The Sherman was largely held in good regard and viewed positively by many Soviet tank-crews which operated it before, with compliments mainly given to its reliability, ease of maintenance, generally good firepower (referring especially to the 76mm-gun version) and decent armour protection, as well as an auxiliary-power unit (APU) to keep the tank's batteries charged without having to run the main engine for the same purpose as the Soviets' own T-34 tank required.

=== Cold War ===
With massive quantities of weapons and tanks from World War II, and the factories to produce them, the Soviets exported them and built up client states which spread their influence and became involved in the continuing state of political conflict, military tension, proxy wars, and economic competition existing afterwards known as the Cold War. The Cold War featured periods of relative calm and of international high tension – the Berlin Blockade (1948–1949), the Korean War (1950–1953), the Berlin Crisis of 1961, the Vietnam War (1955–1975), the Cuban Missile Crisis (1962), the Soviet–Afghan War (1979–1989), and various smaller conflicts in which Soviet weapons had significant impact in many wars.

==== Korean War ====
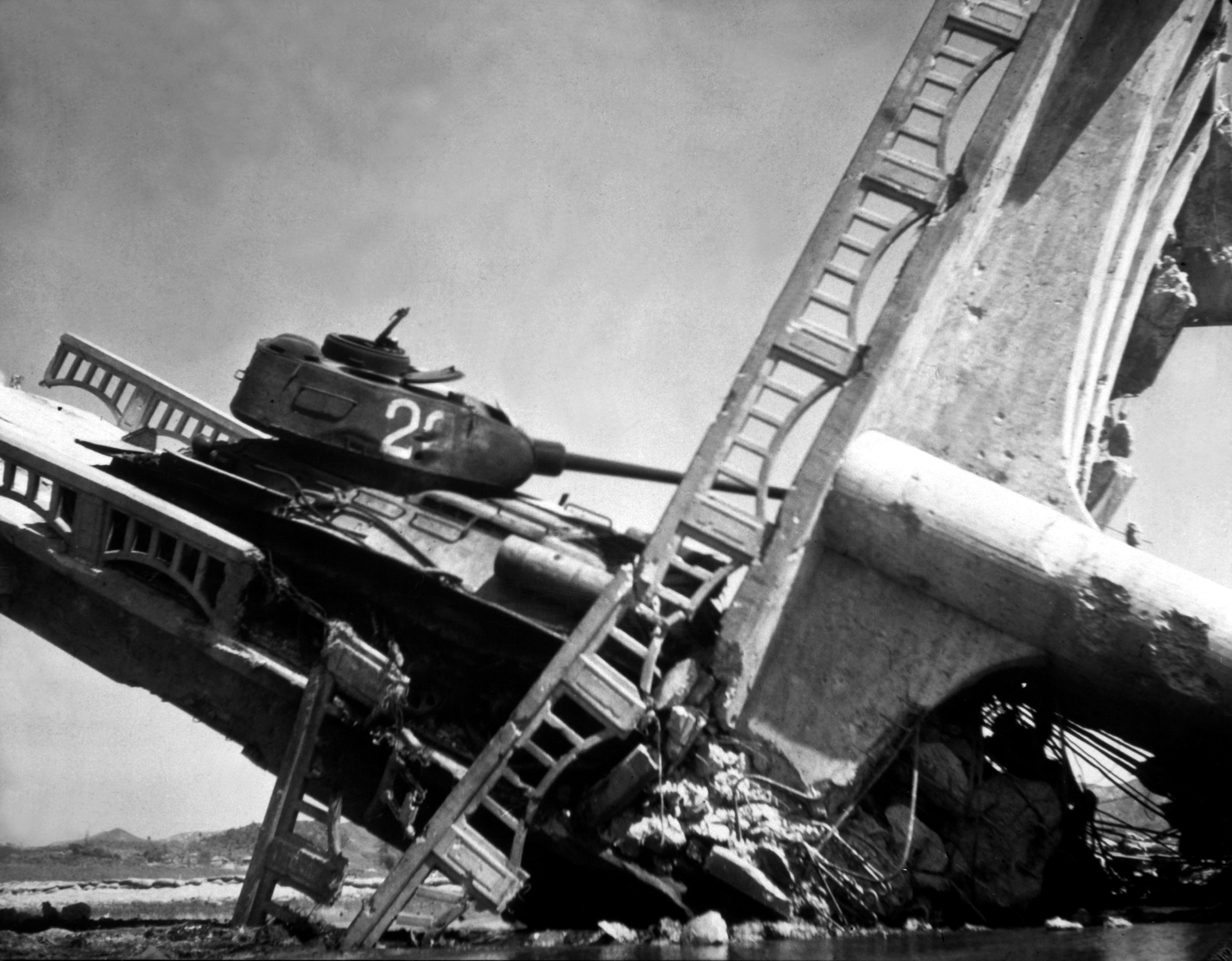
A North Korean T-34-85 caught on a bridge south of Suwon by United States attack aircraft during the Korean War.

Initially, North Korean armour dominated the battlefield with Soviet T-34-85 medium tanks designed during the Second World War. The KPA's tanks confronted a tankless ROK Army armed with few modern anti-tank weapons, including World War II–model 2.36-inch (60 mm) M9 bazookas, effective only against the 45 mm side armor of the T-34-85 tank. The US forces arriving in Korea were equipped with light M24 Chaffee tanks (on occupation duty in nearby Japan) that also proved ineffective against the heavier KPA T-34 tanks.

During the initial hours of warfare, some under-equipped ROK Army border units used 105 mm howitzers as anti-tank guns to stop the tanks heading the KPA columns, firing high-explosive anti-tank (HEAT) ammunition over open sights to good effect; at the war's start, the ROK Army had 91 such guns, but lost most to the invaders.

The North Korean invasion of South Korea in June 1950 was spearheaded by a full brigade equipped with about 120 T-34-85s. More T-34 tanks later joined the first assault force after it had penetrated into South Korea. They were pitted against the M24 Chaffee, M4 Sherman and M26 Pershing, but not the Centurion tanks of the UN forces.

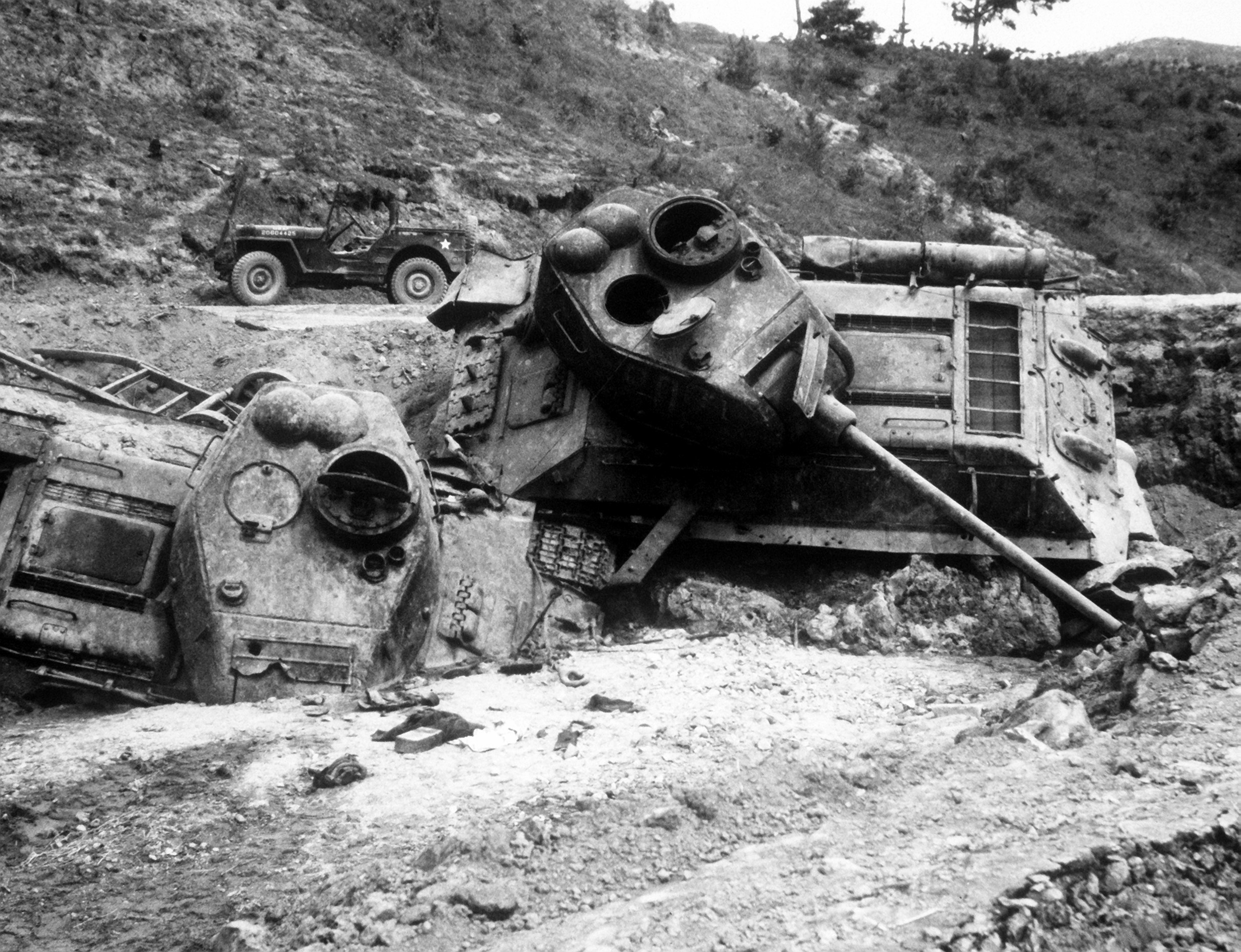
North Korean T-34 tanks destroyed by US Air Force bombs near Waegwan.

The T-34 tanks of the North Korean army rolled across the border and headed south where they brushed aside opposition with ease, such as when they came into contact with elements of the 24th Infantry Division in the Battle of Osan on July 5, 1950 during the first battle between American and North Korean forces. The American force, nicknamed Task Force Smith, was unable to repel the North Koreans' T-34 tanks. Ammunition and weapons designed to combat the heavily armoured tanks had not been widely distributed to U.S. Army forces in Korea at the time, and the Task Force only had a few rounds of effective howitzer ammunition. The Task Force's outdated equipment could not penetrate the North Korean T-34 tanks armor, which subsequently passed through their lines. The 24th Infantry Division would continue to fight in delaying actions such as this one for two more weeks until it was overwhelmed at the Battle of Taejon, where the North Koreans advanced on the town with the 3rd and 4th Divisions supported by over 50 T-34 tanks, and the Allies fell back into the Pusan Perimeter which was defined by the farthest advance of the North Korean troops during the Korean War. The Allies fought off the attacks in the Pusan Perimeter which served as an airhead for resupply and reinforcement until the Inchon landing, and the ensuing counterattack against the North.

Countering the initial combat imbalance, the UN Command reinforcement materiel included heavier US M4 Sherman, M26 Pershing, M46 Patton, and British Cromwell and Centurion tanks that proved effective against North Korean armour, ending its battlefield dominance. Unlike in the Second World War (1939–45), in which the tank proved a decisive weapon, the Korean War featured few large-scale tank battles. The mountainous, heavily forested terrain prevented large masses of tanks from manoeuvring. In Korea, tanks served largely as infantry support.

==== Vietnam War ====
The Viet Cong, a lightly armed South Vietnamese communist-controlled common front, largely fought a guerilla war against anti-communist forces in the region with light weapons. The North Vietnamese Army (NVA), however, engaged in a more conventional war, at times committing large units and armour into battle. North Vietnamese tanks such as the PT-76 tanks and the T-54/T-55 tanks series which had become the main tank for armoured units of the Soviet Army, and exported to many other armies including the Vietnamese, along with the Type 59s and Type 63s, formed the bulk of the NVA armoured forces.

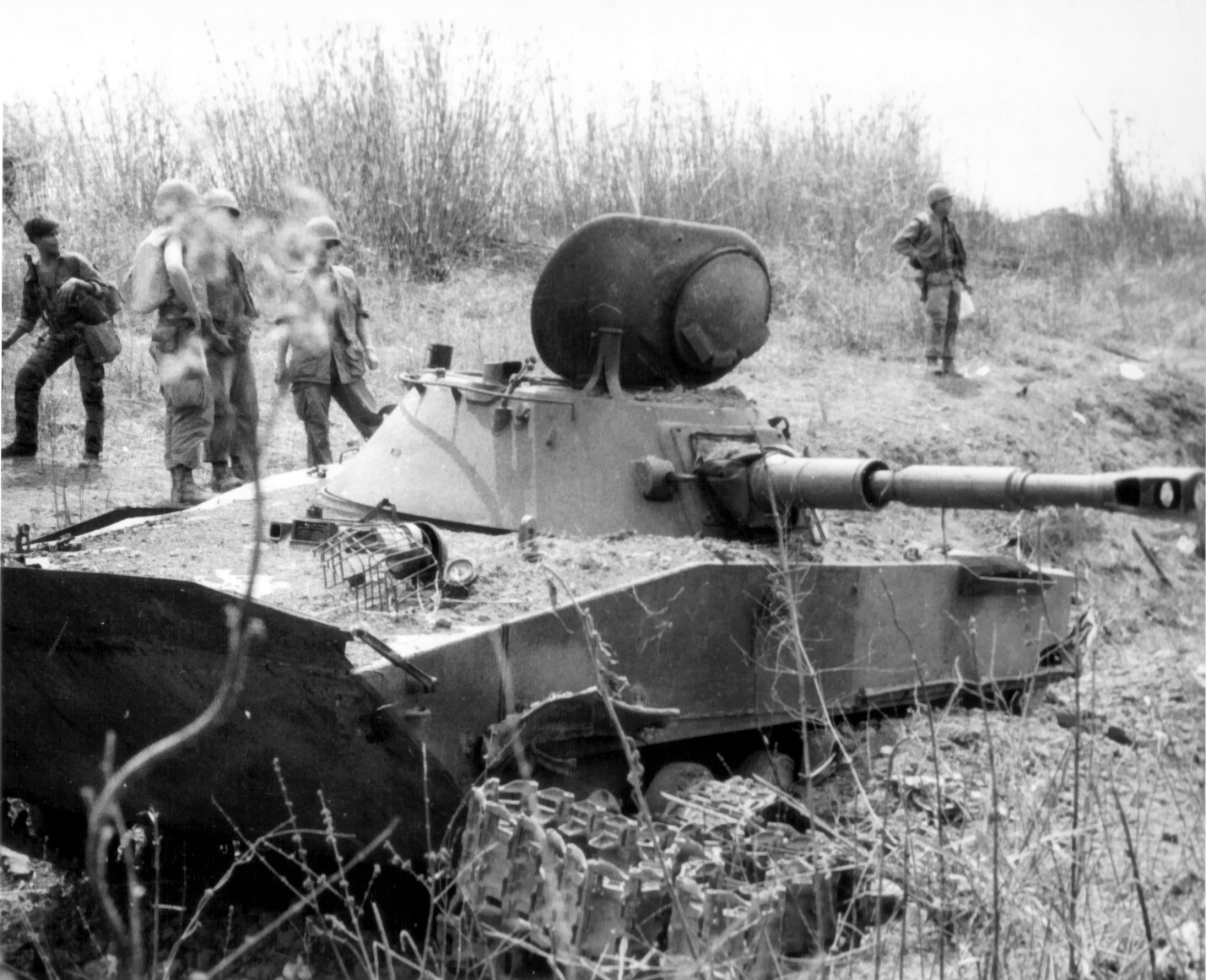
One of two PT-76s from the NVA 202nd Armored Regiment, destroyed by US M48 Pattons, from the 1/69th Armored Battalion, during the battle of Ben Het, March 3, 1969, Vietnam.

The first successful action of NVA armour was against the Lang Vei Special Forces camp on 6–7 February 1968. Thirteen PT-76s, of the NVA 202nd Armored Regiment spearheaded an assault against approximately 24 Green Berets and 500 irregulars. The defenders fought back with M72 LAWs (Light Anti-Tank weapons/66 mm), and requested support from nearby Khe Sanh, who were unable to help, as they too, were under siege. The few survivors broke out, and were airlifted to safety.

The first tank-to-tank engagement occurred in mid-1968 when a US reconnaissance airplane observed a PT-76 being washed by its crew in the Bến Hải River in the DMZ (17th Parallel). The Forward Air Control pilot radioed the tank's position to a nearby M48 Patton tank unit of the US 3rd Marine Tank Battalion. With the FAC adjusting fire, the Patton fired three 90 mm rounds; obtaining a hit with the third round. The tank crew abandoned their vehicle.

Another tank engagement took place on March 3, 1969, again at Ben Het in Kon Tum Province near the Laotian border. In a night assault, the North Vietnamese with PT-76 tanks attacked a US Special Forces camp. The garrison, which had been reinforced with a platoon of M48A3 main battle tanks from the 1st Battalion, 69th Armor Regiment, stood their ground. The North Vietnamese fired 639 artillery and mortar rounds into the camp, before a battalion from the 66th NVA Regiment supported by ten PT-76s and a few APCs attacked the west hill held by a CIDG company supported by the platoon of M48s. The PT-76s drove into a minefield in which one was destroyed. One more PT-76 and one APC were destroyed by the M48s. US casualties consisted of one M48 being lightly damaged.

The Easter Offensive, officially, the Nguyễn Huệ Offensive and also (Chiến dịch Xuân hè 1972 in Vietnamese), was a military campaign heavy with armoured forces and tanks conducted by the People's Army of Vietnam (PAVN, the regular army of North Vietnam) against the Army of the Republic of Vietnam (ARVN, the regular army of South Vietnam) and the United States military between 30 March and 22 October 1972, during the Vietnam War. This conventional invasion (the largest offensive operation since 300,000 Chinese volunteers had crossed the Yalu River into North Korea during the Korean War) was led by armoured forces. Two PAVN divisions (the 304th and 308th - approximately 30,000 troops) supported by more than 100 tanks (in two regiments) rolled over the Demilitarized Zone to attack I Corps, the five northernmost provinces of South Vietnam. The North Vietnamese moved out of Laos along Route 9, past Khe Sanh, and east into the Quảng Trị River Valley of South Vietnam. The PAVN advance was followed by antiaircraft units armed with new ZSU-57-2 tracked weapon platforms and man-portable, shoulder-fired Grail missiles, which made low-level bombing attacks against the columns of tanks hazardous.

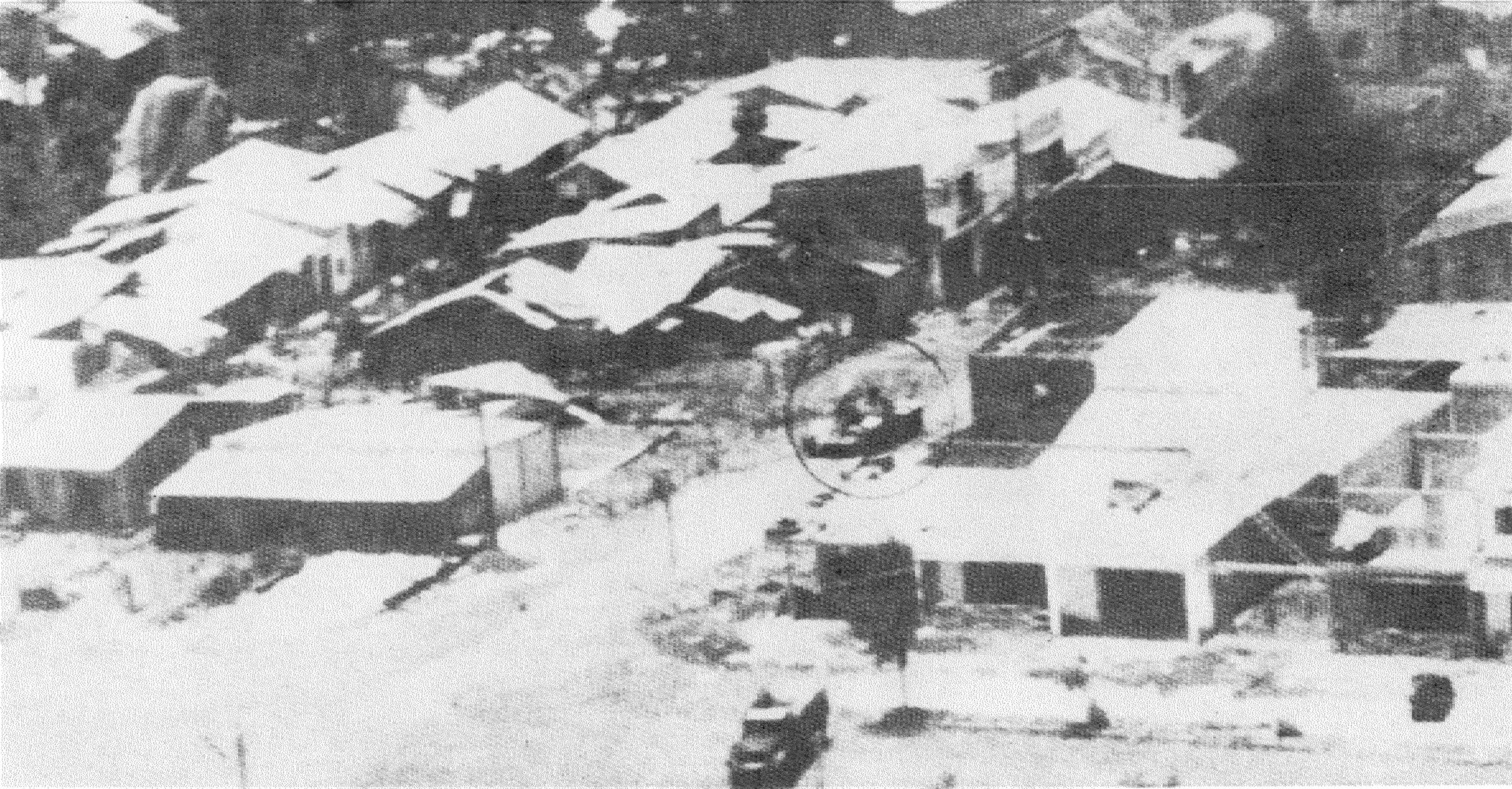
North Vietnamese T-54 tank knocked out in An Lộc by U.S. Army AH-1 Cobra helicopter gunship

On May 9, 1972, the North Vietnamese tanks unwittingly participated in changing the story of armoured warfare. On April 24, 1972, a US special experimental UH-1B helicopter team, consisting of two helicopters mounting the new XM26 TOW anti-tank missile (Tube Launched, Optically Tracked, Wire guided), accompanied by technicians from Bell Helicopters and the Hughes Aircraft Corporation, arrived in the country. The team, labelled the 1st Combat Aerial TOW Team, deployed to the Central Highlands in Vietnam and commenced gunnery training. From May 2, the team made daily flights in search of enemy armour. On May 9, NVA armoured units attacked the Ranger camp at Ben Het; the TOW team destroyed three PT-76s and broke up the attack.

On May 26, 1972, the North Vietnamese Army moved with armoured forces on the city of Kon Tum. TOW aircraft were brought in at first light and found NVA tanks moving almost at will through portions of the city. Conventional air strikes would prove risky to friendly forces, but the TOW proved to be ideal for picking off enemy tanks. At the end of the first day, the two TOW helicopters had destroyed nine tanks and damaged one more. Five of the destroyed tanks had been T-54/55s and the remaining four destroyed and one damaged were PT-76s. By the end of the month, TOW missiles launched from helicopters had 24 were tanks.

But in the end, as South Vietnamese forces crumbled, it was a T-54 tank of the North Vietnamese Army that bulldozed through the main gate of the Presidents at 10:45 on 30 April 1975, ending the Vietnam War.

==== Middle East conflicts ====
===== Six-Day War =====
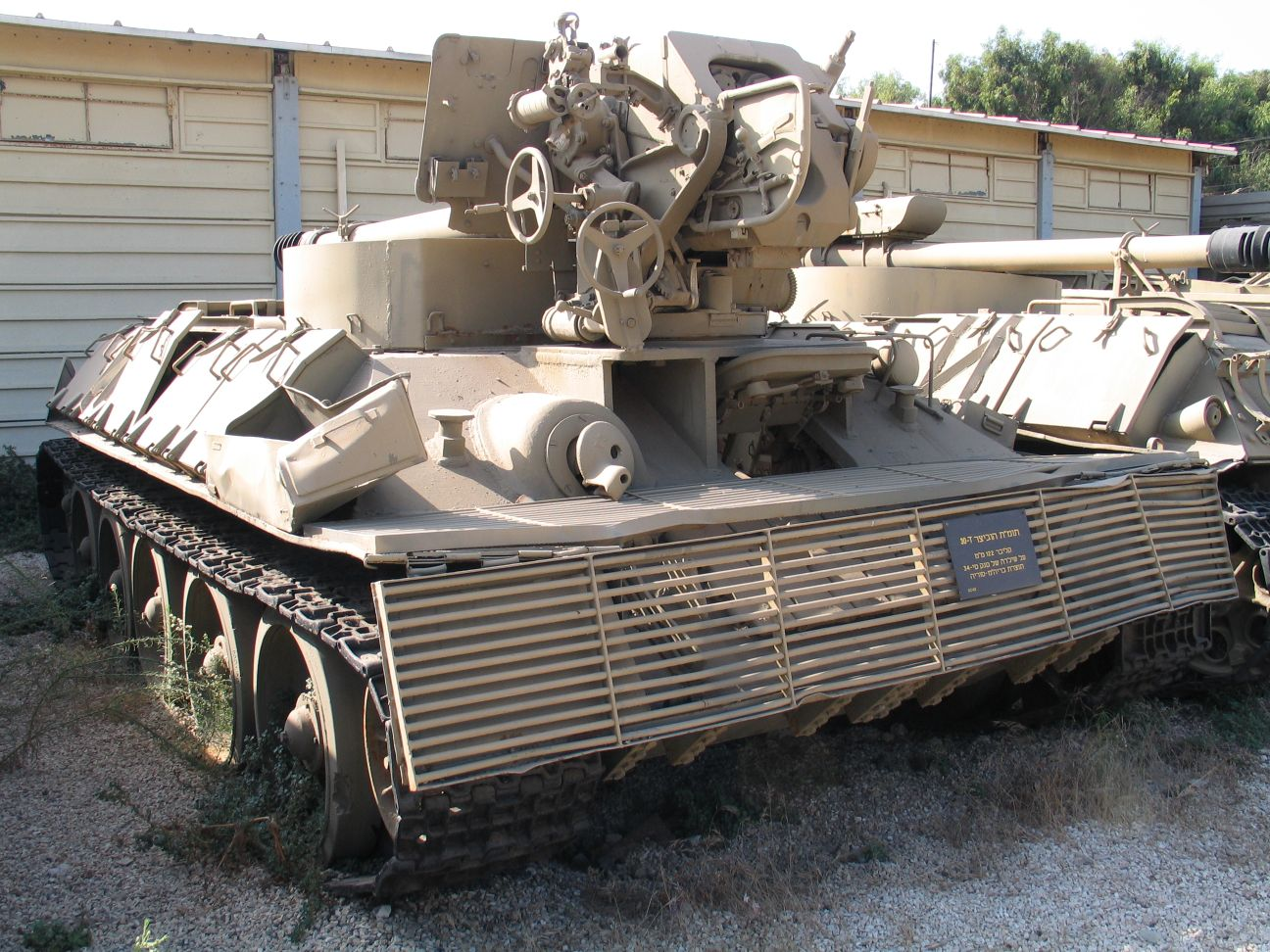
Syrian T-34 tank conversion designated a T-34/122 with 122 mm D-30 howitzer.

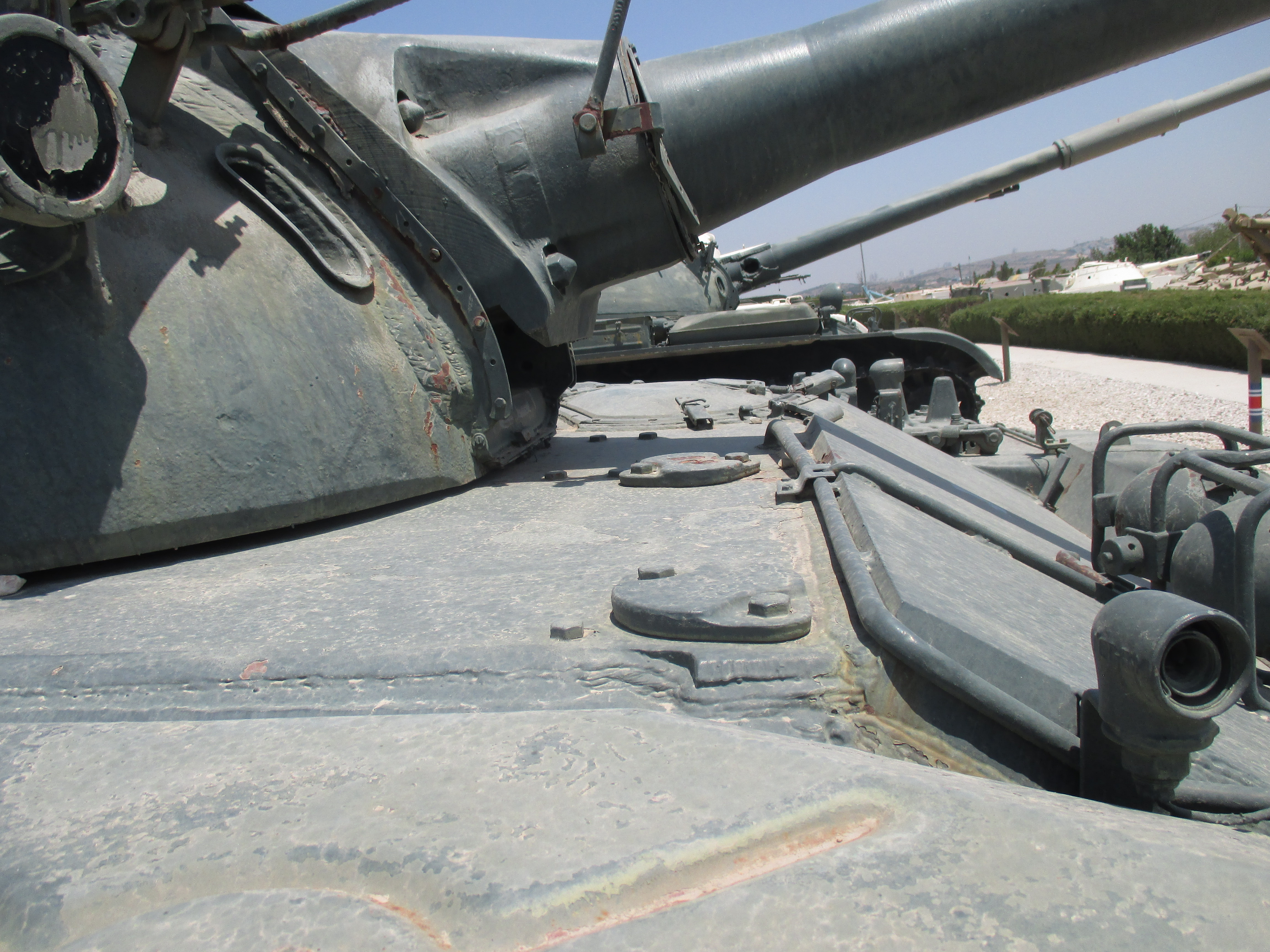
Flat margin between an Egyptian T-54/55's turret and angled glacis, one of the few areas on the tank vulnerable to 90mm HEAT munitions.

Prior to the Six-Day War in 1967, the Arab armies had fought with a mixture of weapons mostly British, although Egypt acquired American M4A4 tanks and fitted them with the diesel engine of M4A2 and the FL-10 turret of the French AMX-13 light tank. Syria possessed at least one M4A1 chassis at some time during 1948–1956. But after the Suez Crisis in 1956 they built up their arsenal mainly with Soviet arms. It is known the Syrians got upgraded T-34-85s which they called T-34/55. This unit was a Syrian modernization of Soviet-made T-34-85s earlier with an anti-aircraft machine gun fitted to the commander's cupola and other upgrades. The Syrians also acquired a T-34 tank conversions designated a T-34/122 made into a self-propelled howitzer armed with a 122 mm D-30 howitzer.

The Six-Day War was fought between June 5 and June 10, 1967, by Israel and the neighboring states of Egypt [known then as the United Arab Republic (UAR)], Jordan, and Syria. In the war, Egypt, Syria, Jordan, and Iraq had over 2,504 tanks against Israel 800 tanks. However, Israel completed a decisive air offensive in the first two days, which crippled the Egyptian, Syrian and Iraqi air forces, destroyed Jordan's Air Force, and rapidly established complete air supremacy. The Israeli Air Force pummeled the Arab armies, and with air supremacy, was able to destroy many of their tanks at will, but the Israeli armor also had tank on tank battles. Typical was the Battle of Abu-Ageila, where Egyptian forces with armoured forces included a battalion of tank destroyers and a tank regiment, formed of Soviet World War II armor, which included 90 T-34-85 tanks (with 85 mm guns), 22 SU-100 tank destroyers (with 100 mm guns), and about 16,000 men,[141] clashed with the Israelis with 150 post-World War II tanks including the AMX-13 with 90 mm guns, Centurions, and Super Shermans (both types with 105 mm guns). Combined forces of Israeli armor, paratroopers, infantry, artillery and combat engineers attacked the Egyptian position from the front, flanks and rear, destroying many tanks and cutting the Egyptian forces off. At the war's end, Israel had seized the Gaza Strip and the Sinai Peninsula from Egypt, the West Bank from Jordan, and the Golan Heights from Syria.

Egyptian armoured forces were by the time of the Six-Day War, mostly Soviet. Egypt had ordered 350 T-54s and 50 PT-76s from the Soviet Union and delivered by 1966 before the Six-Day War. Egypt lost 820 vehicles in the Six-Day War including 82 T-55s. After the losses, Egypt rearmed and 800 T-54s were ordered in 1967 from the Soviet Union and delivered between 1967 and 1972. Another 550 T-55s were ordered in 1967 from the Soviet Union and delivered between 1969 and 1973 along with 200 PT-76s ordered in 1970, 50 T-54s ordered in 1972 and 750 T-62s ordered in 1971 from the Soviet Union and had begun to be delivered by 1972 before the start of the next conflict.

===== Yom Kippur War =====
The Yom Kippur War, also known as the 1973 Arab-Israeli War and the Fourth Arab-Israeli War, was fought from October 6 to 26, 1973, between Israel and a coalition of Arab states backing Egypt and Syria. In the Yom Kippur War Egypt, Syria and Iraq used T-34/85, T-54, T-55, T-62 and PT-76, as well as SU-100/152 World War II vintage self-propelled guns. While Israel had M50 and M51 Shermans with upgraded engines, M48A5 Patton, M60A1 Patton, Centurion and about 200 T-54/55 captured during the Six-Day War. All Israeli tanks were upgraded with the British 105 mm L7 gun, prior to the war.

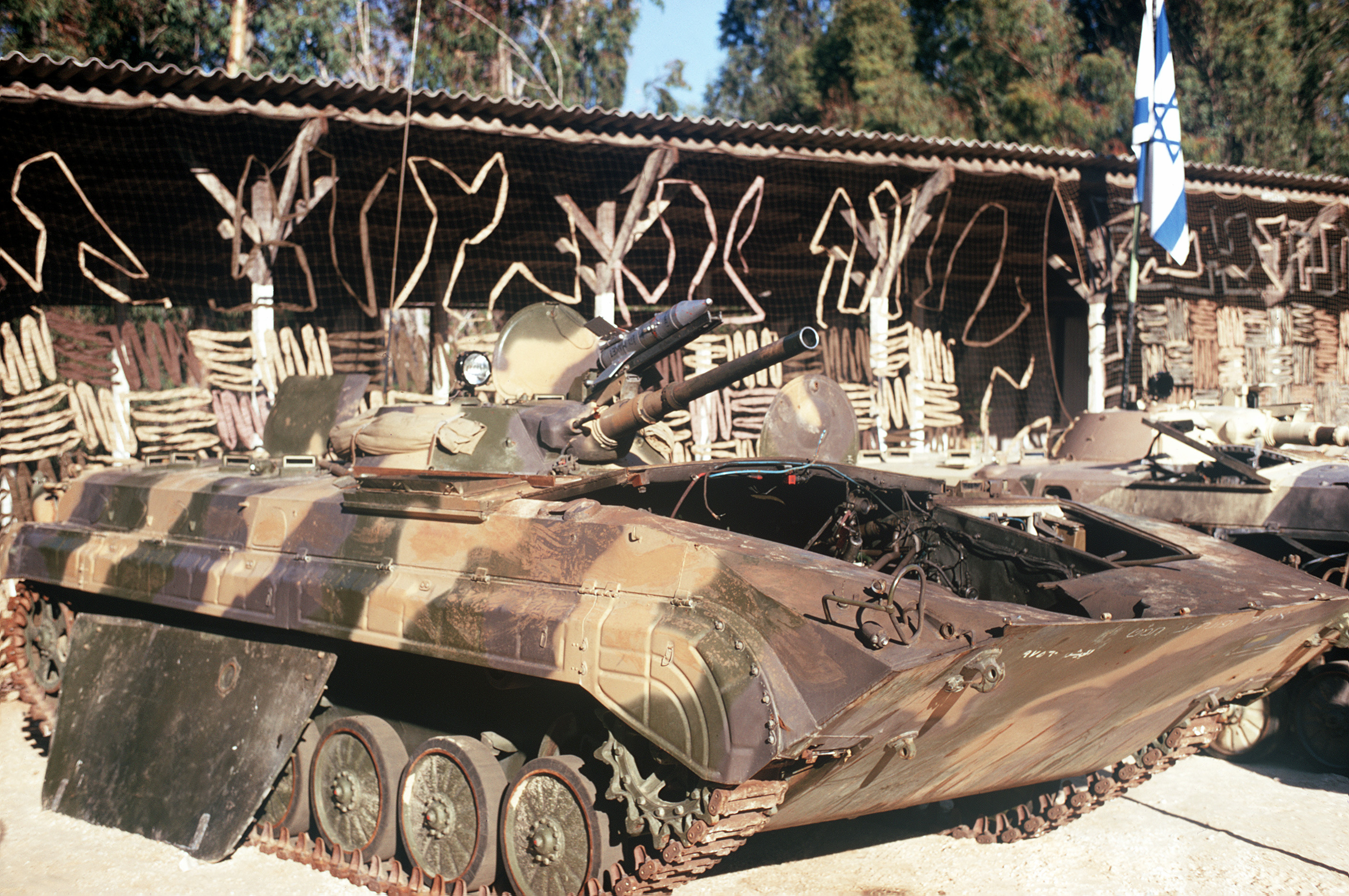
A Soviet made BMP-1 captured by Israeli forces

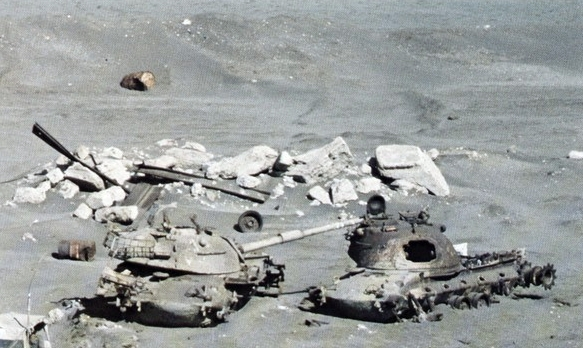
Wreckage of Israeli M48 tanks

The Yom Kipur War began with a massive and successful Egyptian attack across the heavily fortified Suez Canal with tanks it had received from the Soviet Union, T-55s and T-62s tanks, RPG-7 antitank weapons, and the AT-3 Sagger anti-tank guided missile and using improved military tactics, based on Soviet battlefield doctrines. They drove the tanks over portable bridges laid across the Suez Canal, with infantry with portable and recoilless anti-tank weapons. Egyptian forces advanced, into the Sinai Desert with two armies (both corps-sized by western standards, included the 2nd Infantry Division in the northern Second Army) and by the following morning, some 850 Egyptian tanks had crossed the canal and prepared for the Israeli counterattack. The Egyptian 2nd and 3rd Armies attacked eastward with armored forces consisted of 800-1,000 tanks however they moved eastward beyond SAM cover over the Suez Canal, where they came up against 700-750 Israeli tanks. The Egyptian armored and mechanized attack was a total failure. Instead of concentrating forces of maneuvering, they had expended their tanks and armored forces in head-on attack against the waiting Israeli brigades." No fewer than 250 Egyptian tanks and some 200 armored vehicles were destroyed. After stopping the Egyptian attack, the Israelis then counterattacked at the seam between two Egyptian armies, crossed the Suez Canal, and encircled elements of Egypt's Third Army until the United Nations ceasefire resolution which was imposed cooperatively on October 25 to end the war.

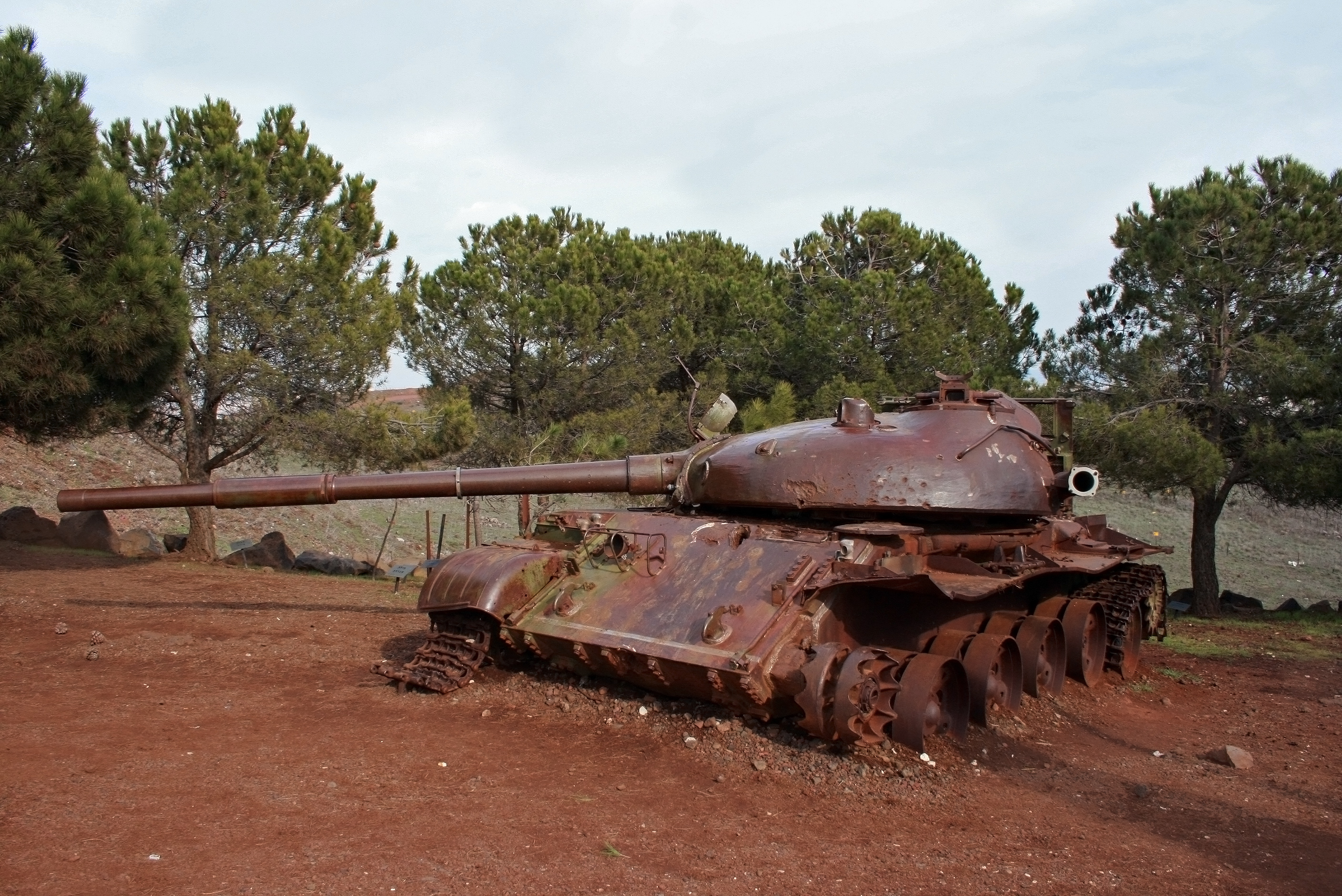
A destroyed Syrian T-62 tank

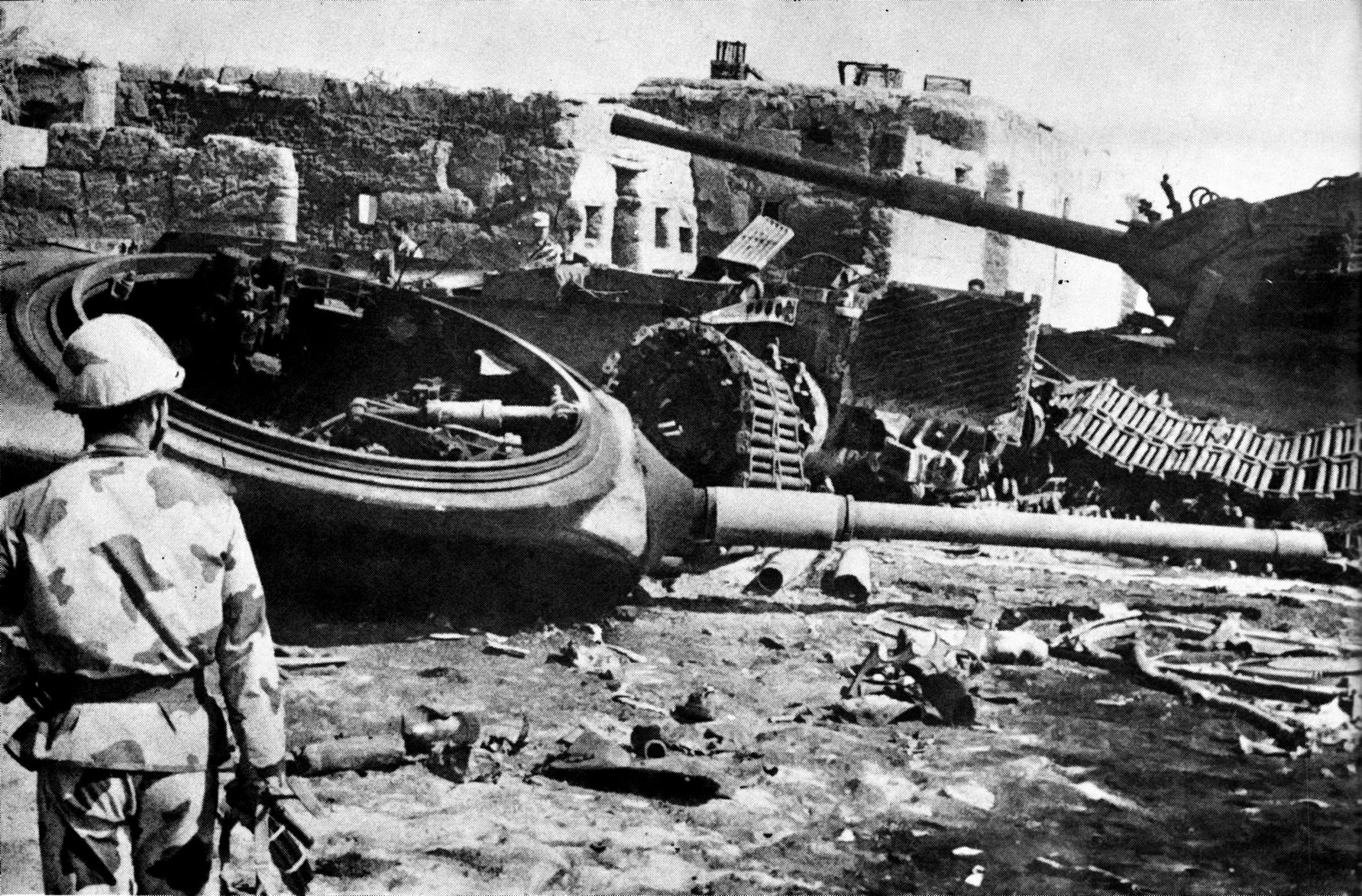
Destroyed Israeli M60A1 Pattons in Sinai

In the north, the Syrians attacked the Golan Heights at the same time with armoured forces and initially made threatening gains against the greatly outnumbered defenders. At the onset of the battle, the Syrians came with three infantry divisions with large armour components comprising 28,000 Syrian troops, 800 tanks and 600 artillery pieces and followed by two armoured divisions against the Israeli brigades of some 3,000 troops, 180 tanks and 60 artillery pieces. The Syrians had bridging tanks to cross antitank ditches, BRDM-mounted Sagger anti-tank missiles, SU-100 gun carriers, and had T-55 tanks equipped with a specially designed infrared nightscope and also T-62 tanks. The Israeli forces did not have adequate optical equipment for night fighting, and had to gauge the position of the Syrian forces by their noise and artillery flares. Israeli forces were worn down but were gradually reinforced over days and within a week, Israel recovered and launched a four-day counter-offensive, driving deep into Syria itself. However, Iraq had also sent an expeditionary force to the Golan, with 250–500 tanks mostly T-55s, and 700 APCs which threatened the Israeli flanks, but the war ended without the Iraqis becoming heavily engaged.

The fact that the Arab armies' T-54/55s and T-62s were equipped with night vision equipment, which the Israeli tanks lacked, gave them an advantage in fighting at night, while Israel tanks had better armor and/or better armament such as the L7|105 mm L7 gun. Israeli tanks also had a distinct advantage in the "hull-down" position where steeper angles of depression resulted in less exposure. The main guns of Soviet tanks could only depress 4 degrees. By contrast, the 105 mm guns on Centurion and Patton tanks could depress 10 degrees. The coalition of Arab states and Egypt and Syria lost 2,300 tanks destroyed or captured

==== Soviet invasion of Afghanistan ====
The Soviet–Afghan War started on December 27, 1979, when 700 Soviet troops dressed in Afghan uniforms, including KGB and GRU special force officers from the Alpha Group and Zenith Group, occupied major governmental, military and media buildings in Kabul, including the Tajbeg Presidential Palace.

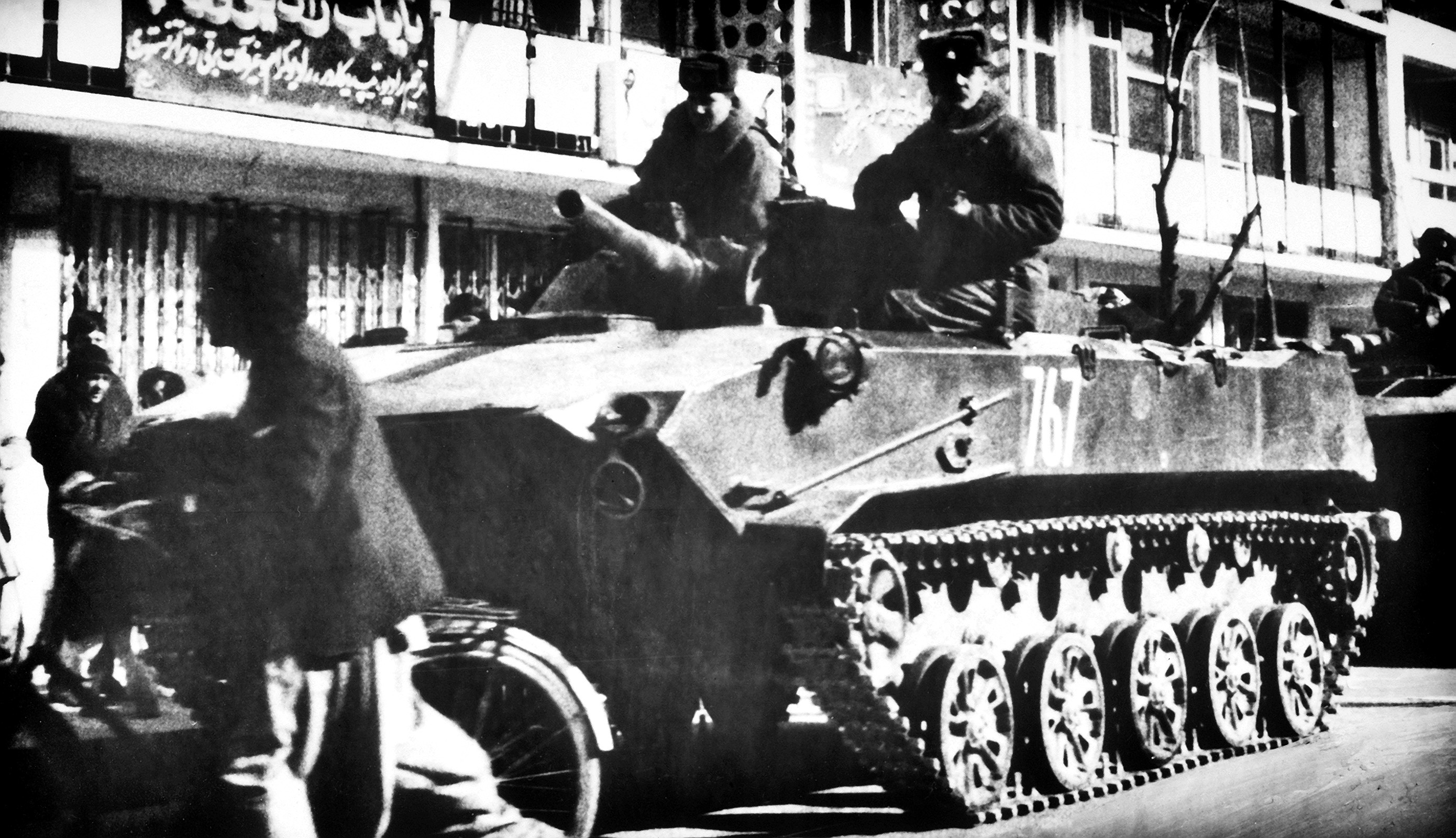
Soviet paratroopers aboard a BMD-1 in Kabul

The Soviet Zenith Group destroyed Kabul's communications hub, paralyzing Afghan military command and the assault on Tajbeg Palace began; as planned, president Hafizullah Amin was killed. The Soviet military command at Termez, Uzbek SSR, announced on Radio Kabul that Afghanistan had been liberated from Amin's rule. According to the Soviet Politburo they were complying with the 1978 Treaty of Friendship, Cooperation and Good Neighborliness and Amin had been "executed by a tribunal for his crimes" by the Afghan Revolutionary Central Committee. That committee then elected as head of government former Deputy Prime Minister Babrak Karmal, and said that it had requested Soviet military assistance.

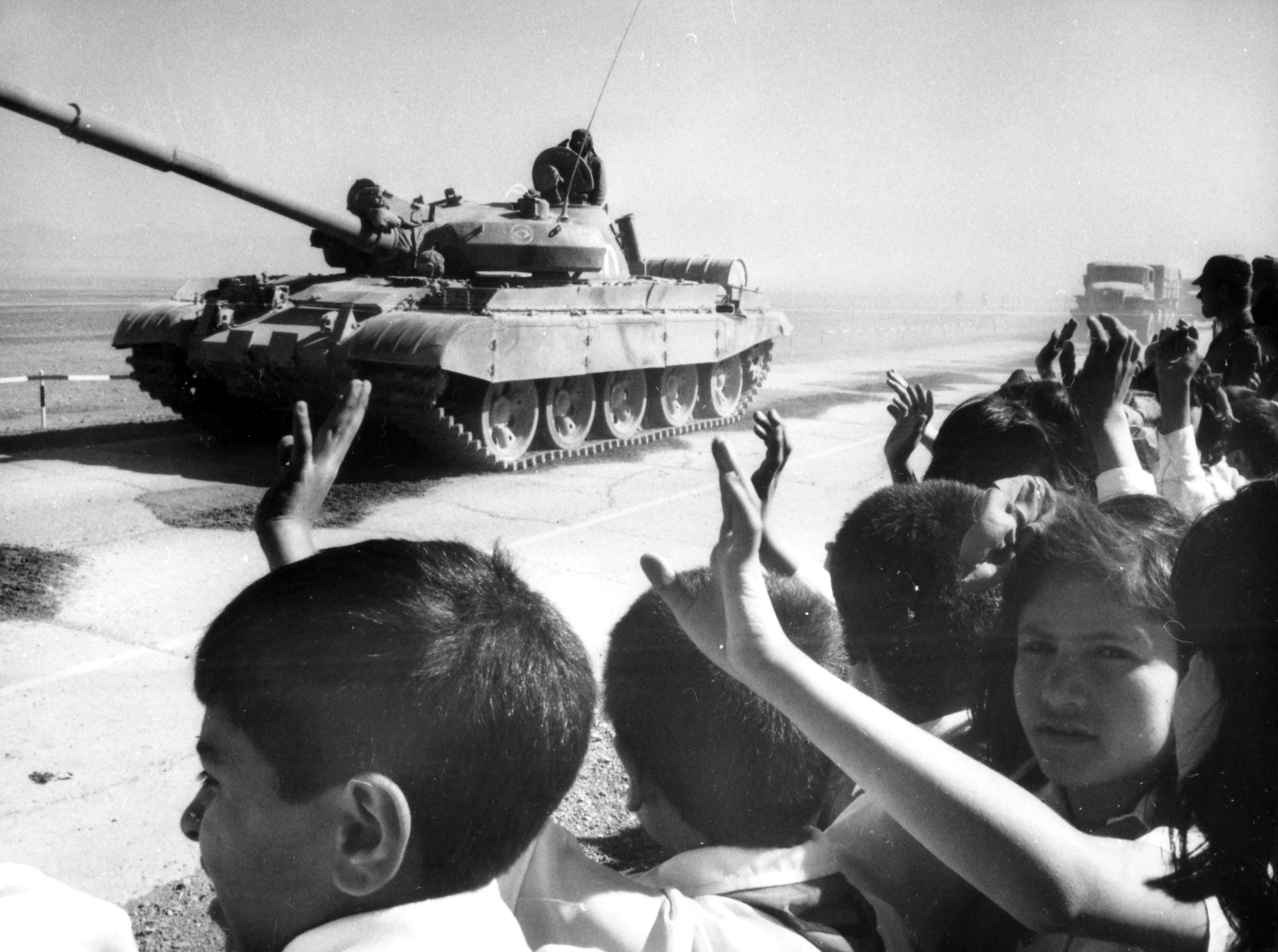
Soviet T-62M main battle tank withdraws from Afghanistan

Soviet ground forces, under the command of Marshal Sergei Sokolov, entered Afghanistan from the north on December 27. In all, the initial Soviet force was around 1,800 tanks, 80,000 soldiers and 2,000 AFVs. In the second week alone, Soviet aircraft had made a total of 4,000 flights into Kabul. With the arrival of the two later divisions, the total Soviet force rose to over 100,000 personnel. The war with mujahideen forces supported by secret aid from the CIA dragged on from the initial Soviet deployment of the 40th Army in Afghanistan on December 24, 1979 till the final troop withdrawal which started on May 15, 1988, and ended on February 15, 1989 under Soviet leader Mikhail Gorbachev. Tanks, Armoured vehicles and artillery losses were as follows:

- 147 tanks
- 1,314 IFV/APCs
- 433 artillery guns and mortars

==== Persian Gulf War ====
During Operation Desert Storm in 1991, the Iraqi armor was usually tanks of Russian design, which included the T-54/55, T-62, Type 59, Type 69, and T-72. In the Battle of Khafji, the first major ground engagement of the Gulf War, Iraqi leader Saddam Hussein, tried and failed to draw Coalition troops into a costly ground engagements with his armoured forces and sent the 1st and 5th Mechanized Divisions and 3rd Armored Division to conduct a multi-pronged invasion toward Khafji, engaging American, Saudi and Qatari forces along the coastline.

Battle of Khafji

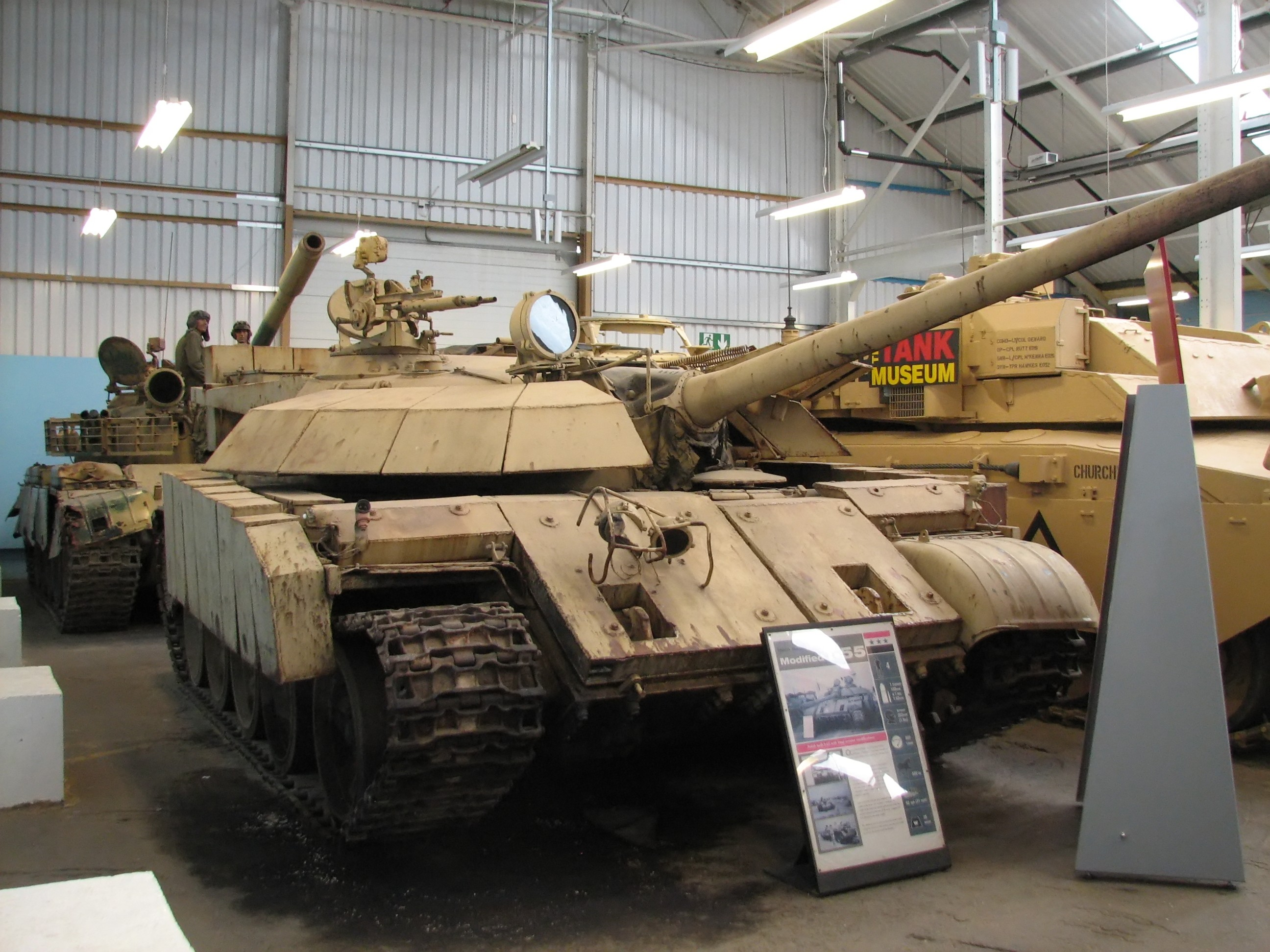
An Iraqi modification of the T-55 tank, used during the battle.

Most non-Republican Guard armored units had older tank designs, but the 3rd Armored Division had a number of T-72 tanks, the only non-Republican Guard force to have them, while the other armored battalions had T-62s and upgraded T-55s. During the battle of Khafji, these upgraded T-55s survived impacts from Milan anti-tank missiles. As the units moved to the Saudi border, many were attacked by Coalition aircraft. Around the Al-Wafrah forest, about 1,000 Iraqi armored fighting vehicles were attacked by Harrier aircraft with Rockeye cluster bombs. Another Iraqi convoy of armored vehicles was hit by A-10s, which destroyed the first and last vehicles, before systematically attacking the stranded remainder. The air raids destroyed many tanks and support vehicles and prevented the majority of the Iraqi troops deployed for the offensive from taking part in it, allowing Saudi and Quatari forces to retake the city.

Movement of Coalition forces in theater of operations.

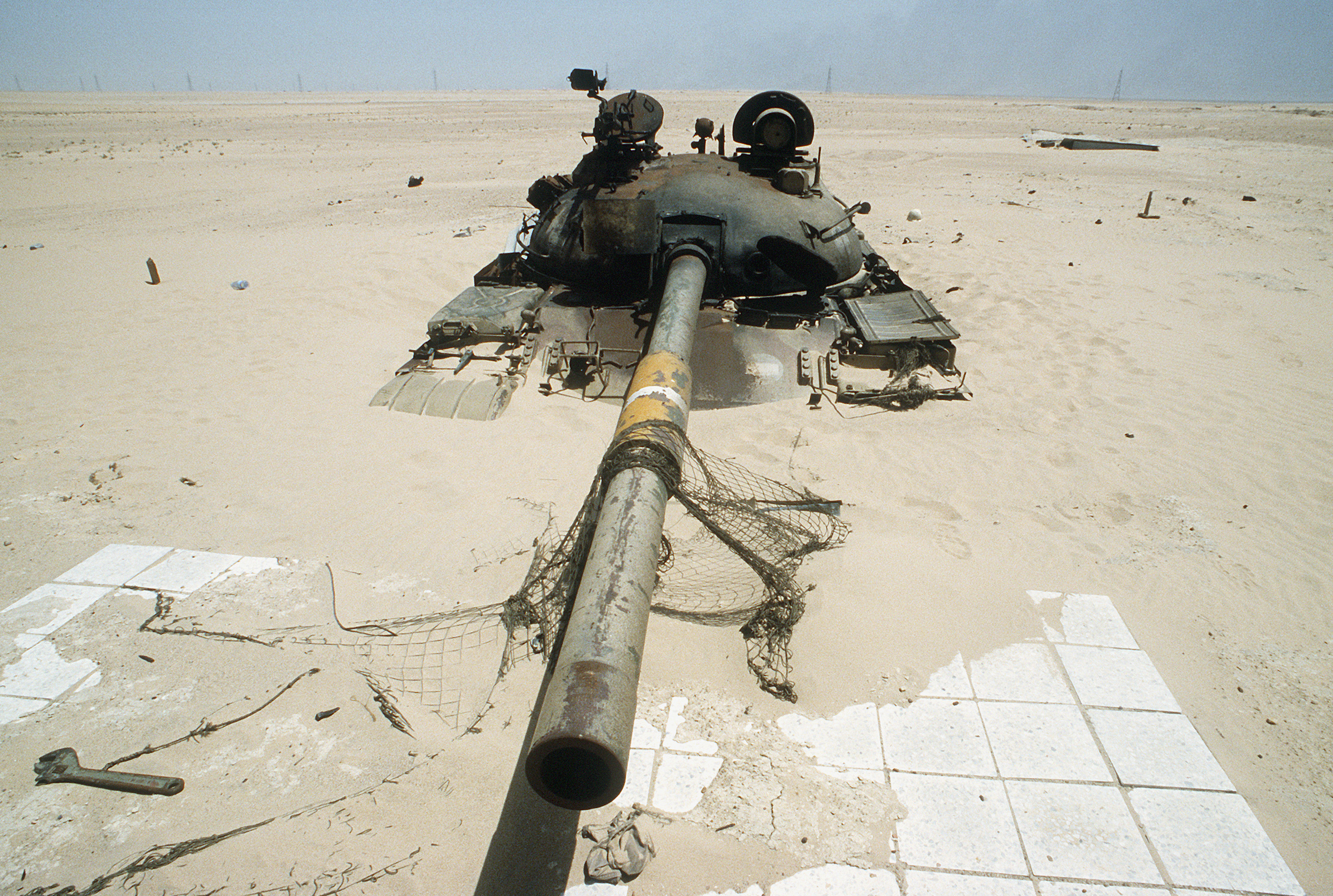
Iraqi T-62 destroyed near Ali Al Salem Air Base during Operation Desert Storm, 18 April 1991

In the launch of the main Allied ground attack, the Iraqi tanks engaged the M60A1 tanks of the U.S. Marines which were fitted with add-on explosive reactive armor (ERA) packages. However, the weakness of Iraq's older Soviet-era tanks, was most evident against the US M1A1 tank. The M1A1 tank was superior to Iraq's Soviet-era T-55 and T-62 tanks.

In the Battle of 73 Easting, which was a decisive tank battle fought on 26 February 1991, during the Gulf War, between American–British armored forces and those of the Iraqi Republican Guard. Superior American night vision equipment turned the poor weather into a U.S. advantage.

The 2nd Armored Cavalry Regiment (2nd ACR), mainly a reconnaissance element of VII Corps along with the corps's vanguard the American 3rd Armored Division (3rd AD) and 1st Infantry Division (1st ID), and the British 1st Armoured Division (1 AD) engaged and smashed Iraqi forces and tanks.

One of 2nd ACR's cavalry units, G- ("Ghost") Troop, initially destroyed several Iraqi armored personnel carriers and three enemy tanks. Reaching 70 Easting, the lead cavalry troops of 2nd "Cougar" Squadron knocked out a screen of eight Iraqi T-72 tanks. The 2nd ACR surprised the enemy and penetrated the Iraqi positions so quickly that they were unable to recover. E-Troop attacked forward and destroyed the Iraqi tanks at 73 Easting at close range. The Iraqis stood their ground while their tanks and armored personnel carriers of the Tawakalna Division attempted to maneuver and fight. E-Troop destroyed more than 20 tanks and other armored vehicles, a number of trucks and bunkers, and took a large number of prisoners with no losses to themselves. Other 2nd ACR Troops, I- ("Iron"), K- ("Killer"), and G- ("Ghost"), joined the fighting at 73 Easting and engaged several waves of Iraqi T-72 and T-55 tanks advancing directly into G-Troop. G-Troop lost one M3 Bradley to Iraqi IFV fire and one soldier, ending with most of the engaged Iraqi elements burning or destroyed.

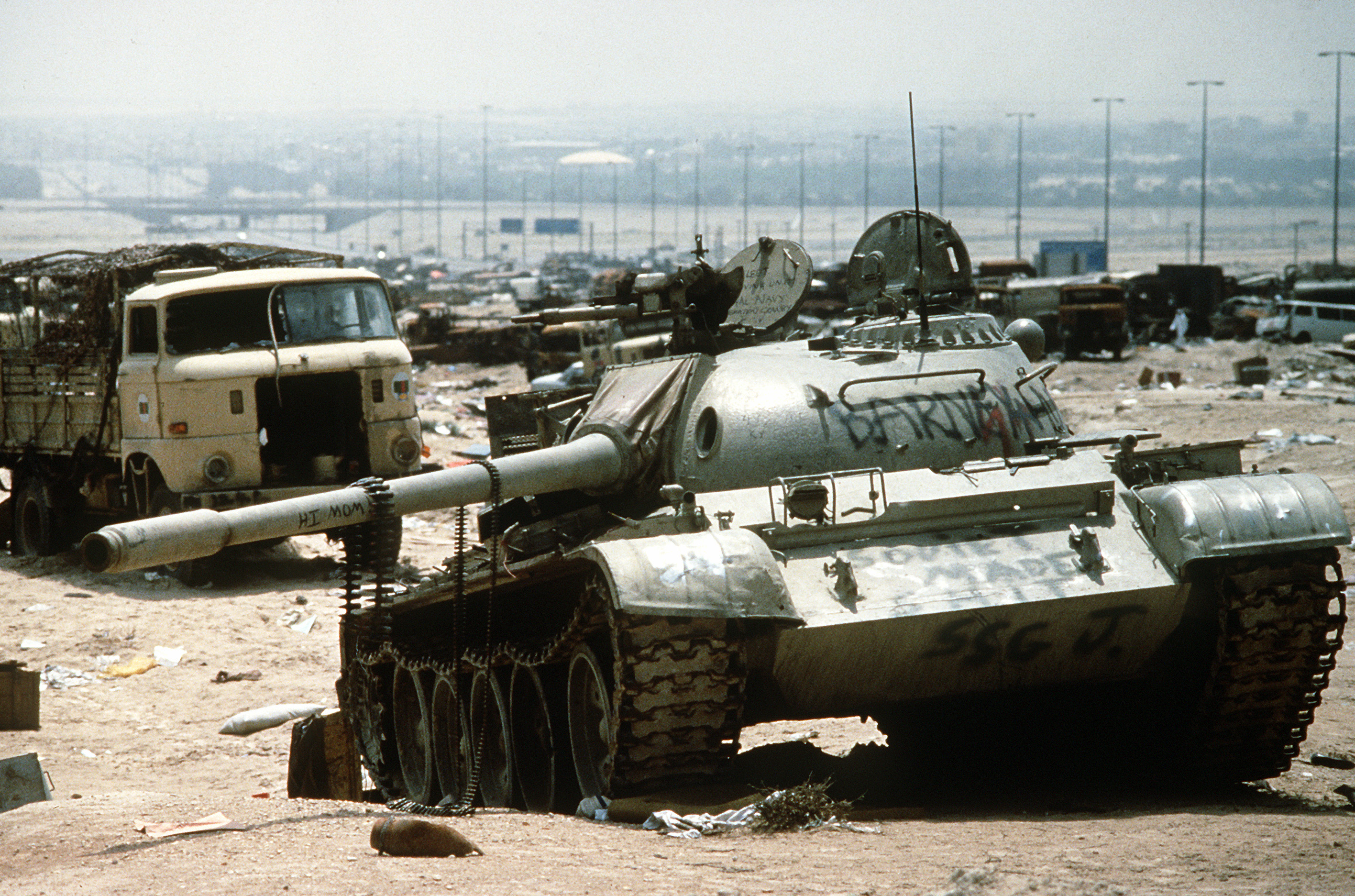
An Iraqi T-55 tank, lies amidst other wreckage along the highway between Kuwait City and Basra in April 1991

The 3rd Brigade, 1st Armored Division of the British Army, engaged the Tawakalna Division, while the Medina Division was attempting to maneuver against 1st Armoured Division. The British responded decisively with MLRS fire, cannon artillery, and air strikes and destroyed 40 enemy tanks and captured an Iraqi division commander. The 2nd ACR's three squadrons, along with the 1st Infantry Division's two leading brigades, destroyed two Iraqi brigades (18th Mechanized Brigade and 37th Armored Brigade) of the Tawakalna Division. The 2nd ACR alone destroyed about 85 tanks, 40 personnel carriers and more than 30 wheeled vehicles, along with several anti-aircraft artillery systems during the battle. The equivalent of an Iraqi brigade was destroyed at the Battle of 73 Easting, in the defeat of the Republican Guard tanks and armored forces.

At the same time, Iraqi troops began retreating from Kuwait, and a long convoy of retreating Iraqi tanks, vehicles and troops formed along the main Iraq-Kuwait highway. Although they were retreating, this convoy was bombed so extensively by Coalition air forces that it came to be known as the Highway of Death as Iraqi tanks and other vehicles out in the open were destroyed by Allied planes as they fled, along with hundreds of Iraqi troops who were killed.

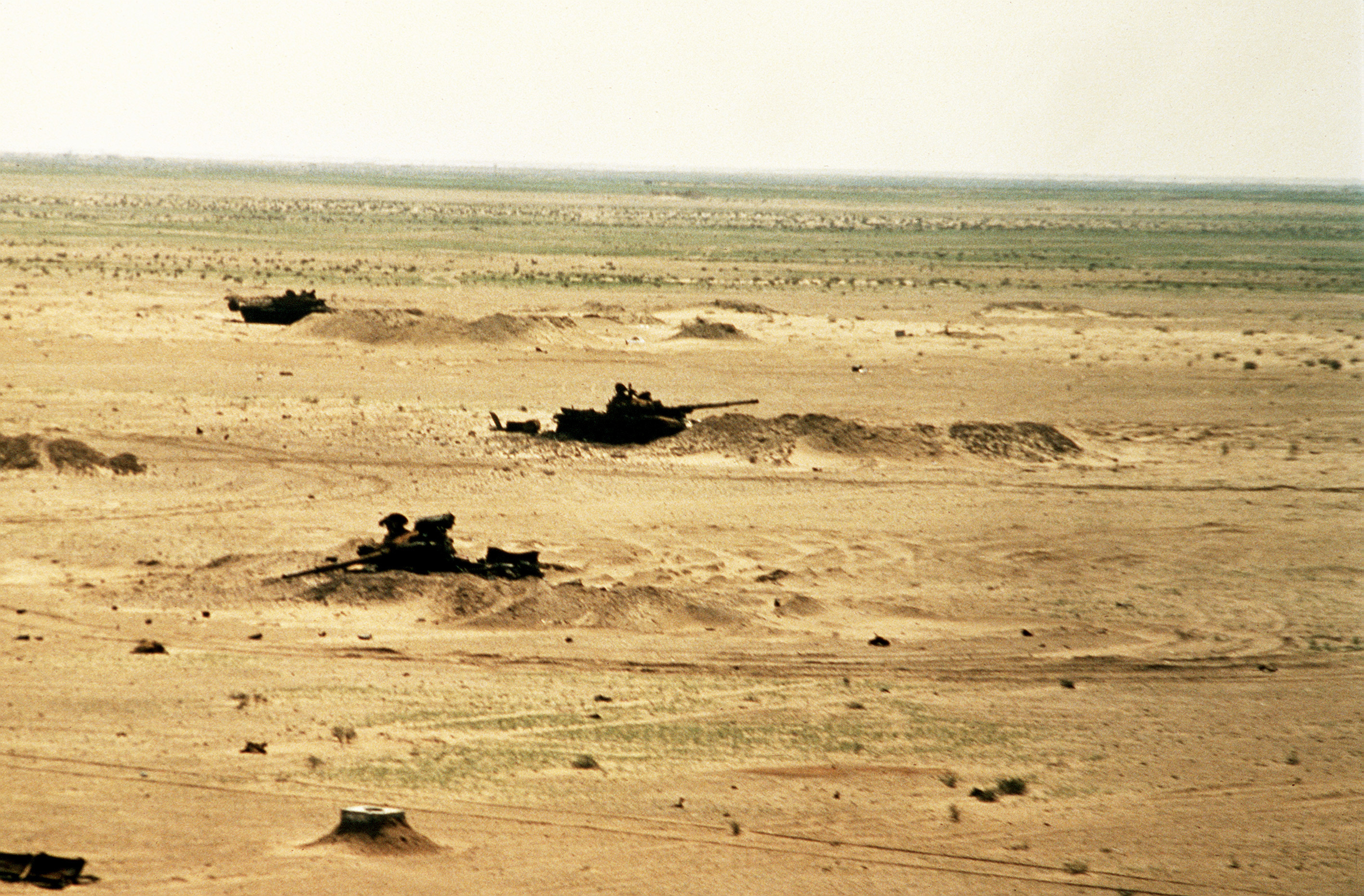
Destroyed Iraqi T-72 tanks in Southern Iraq.

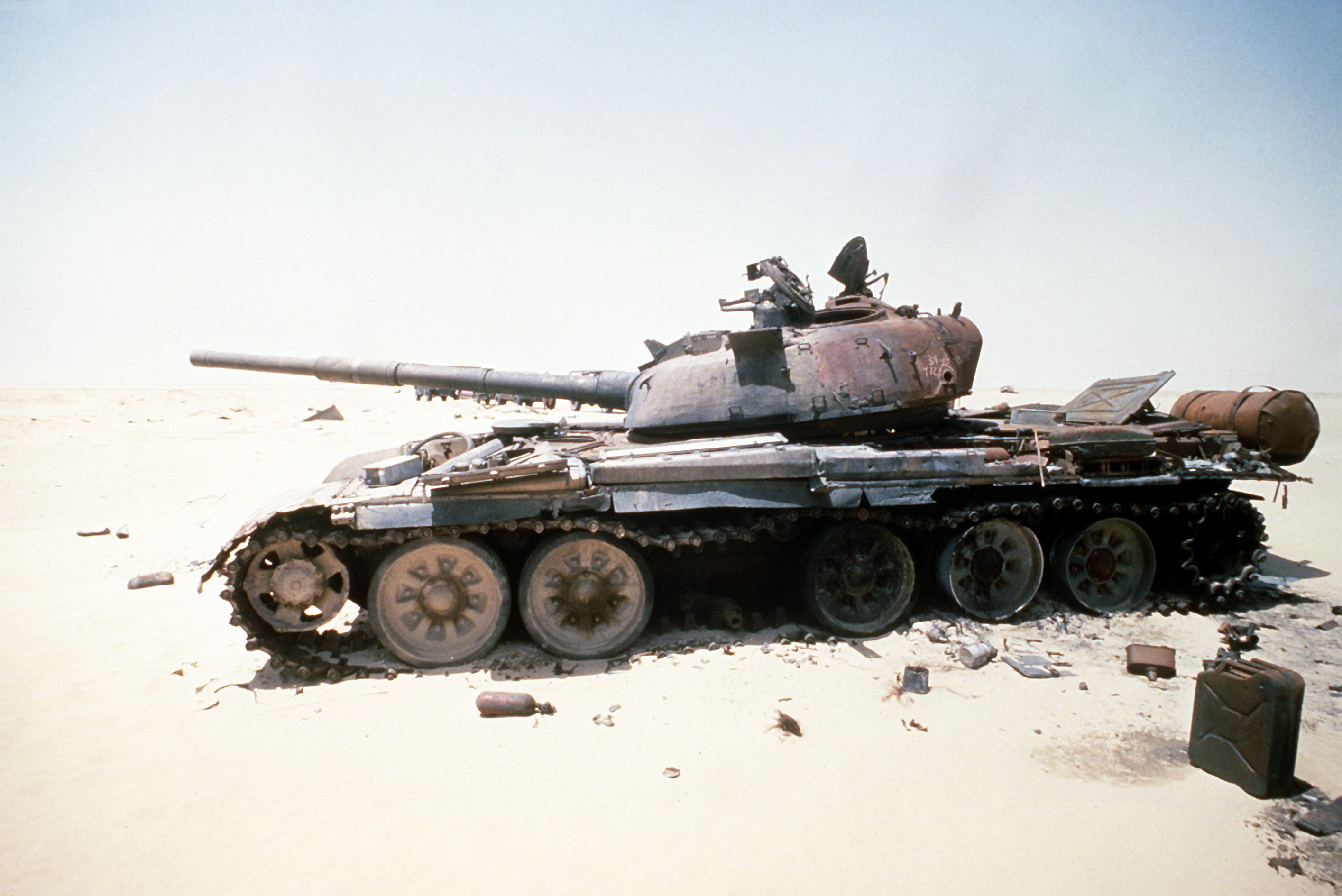
Iraqi T-72 main battle tank destroyed in a Coalition attack during Operation Desert Storm

Post war analysis showed that the majority of Iraqi armored forces still had old Soviet-made T-55s from the 1950s and 1960s, and some Asad Babil tanks (along with some Chinese Type 59s and Type 69 tanks). These machines were not equipped with up-to-date equipment, such as thermal sights or laser rangefinders, and their effectiveness in modern combat was very limited.

The Iraqis failed to find an effective countermeasure to the thermal sights and sabot rounds used by the Coalition tanks. This equipment enabled them to engage and destroy Iraqi tanks from more than three times the range that Iraqi tanks could engage coalition tanks. The Iraqi tank crews used old, cheap steel penetrators against the advanced Chobham Armour of the U.S. and British tanks, with ineffective results.

=== Post Cold War ===
==== War in Afghanistan ====
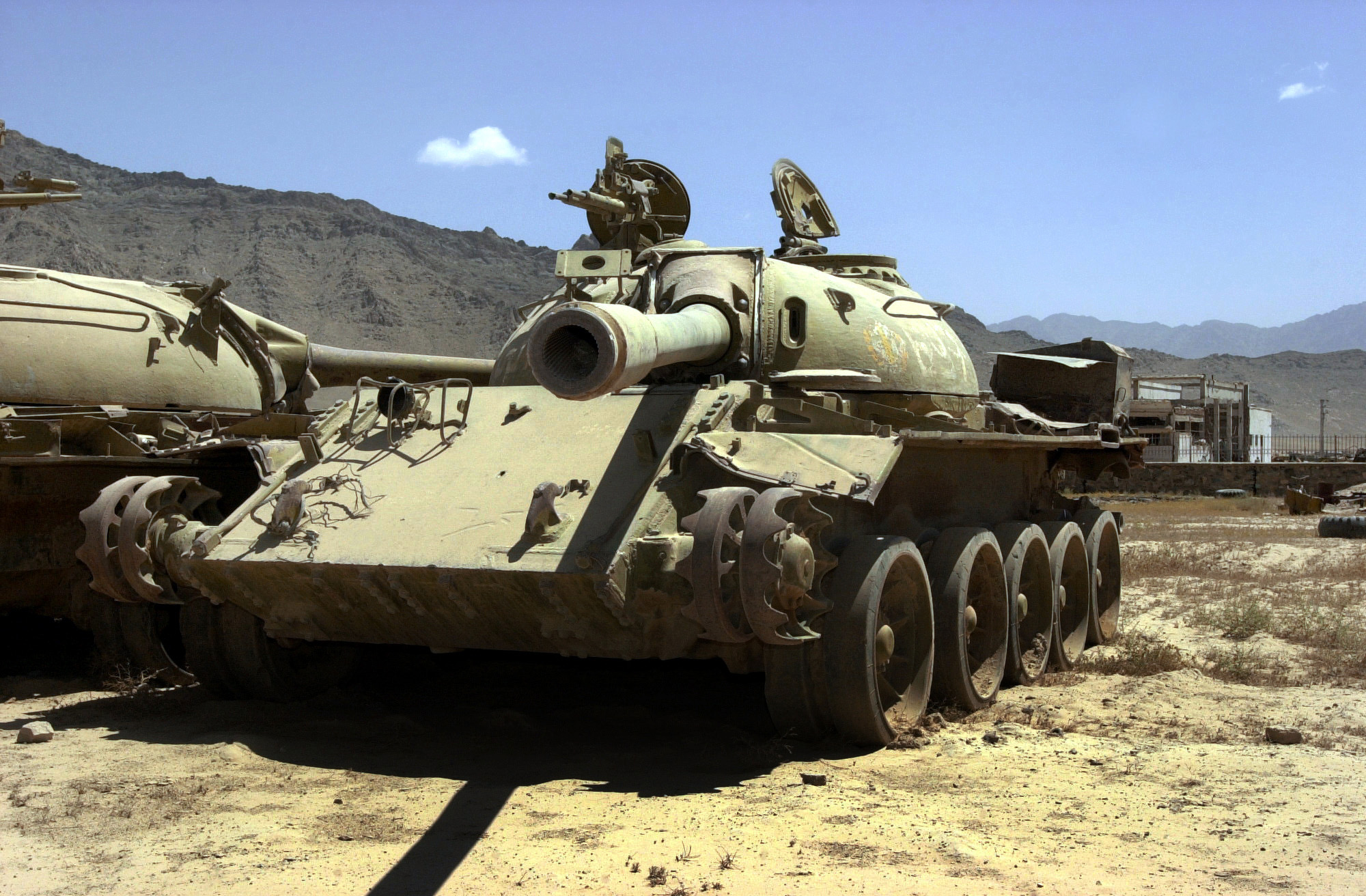
Two Afghan T55 tanks left by the Soviet army during their withdrawal lie rusting in a field near Bagram Air Base.

The civil war continued in Afghanistan after the Soviet withdrawal of 1989. In April, 1992. Afghanistan leader Najibullah and his communist government fell to the mujahideen, who replaced Najibullah with a new governing council for the country. With the government institutions either collapsing or participating in the factional fighting, maintaining order in Kabul became almost impossible. The scene was set for the next phase of the war which led to the rise of and the take over of the country by the Taliban regime. The massive stockpiles of heavy weapons such as T-62 and T-55 tanks, were taken over by the various Afghanistan warlords and along with vehicles such as BMD-1s from the war with the Soviet Union, they were then used in fighting other factions or warlords. Some tanks in the Afghanistan military or military vehicles were left behind for them by retreating Soviets and some were derelicts left by the Soviets all over Afghanistan and brought back to working condition. Since there wasn't any kind of care taken as to what variant an individual tank may be, many T-55s have mixed parts from a number of different variants.

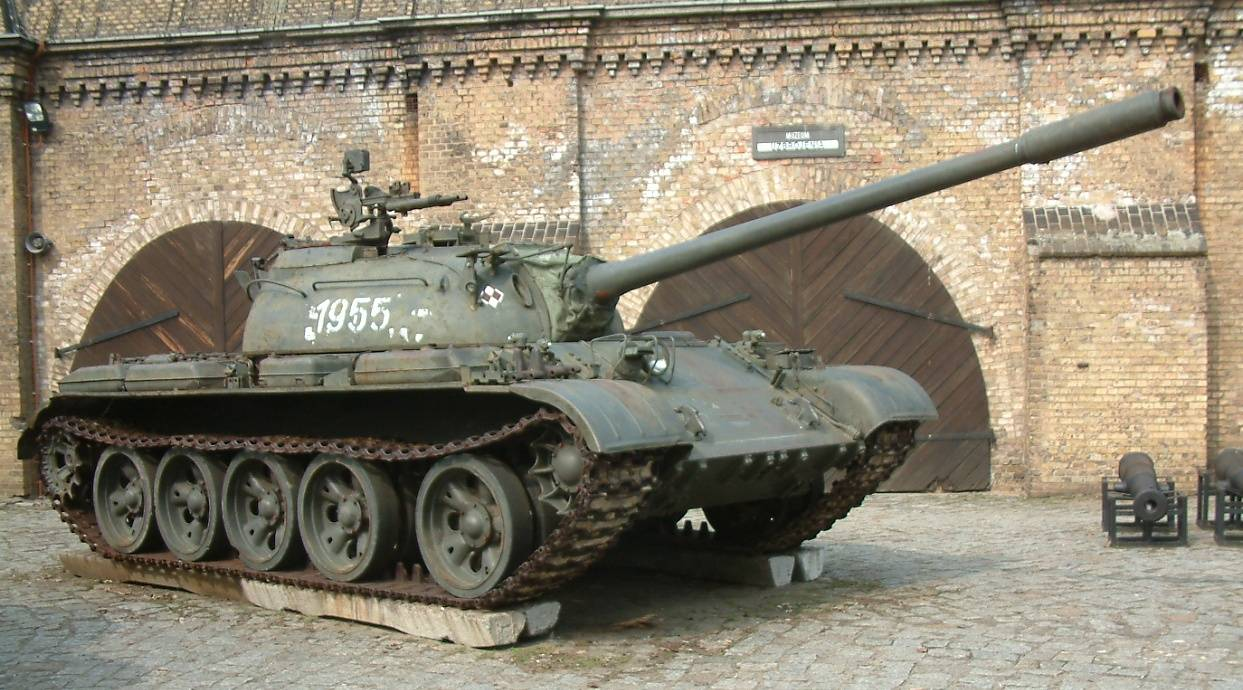
Polish T-55

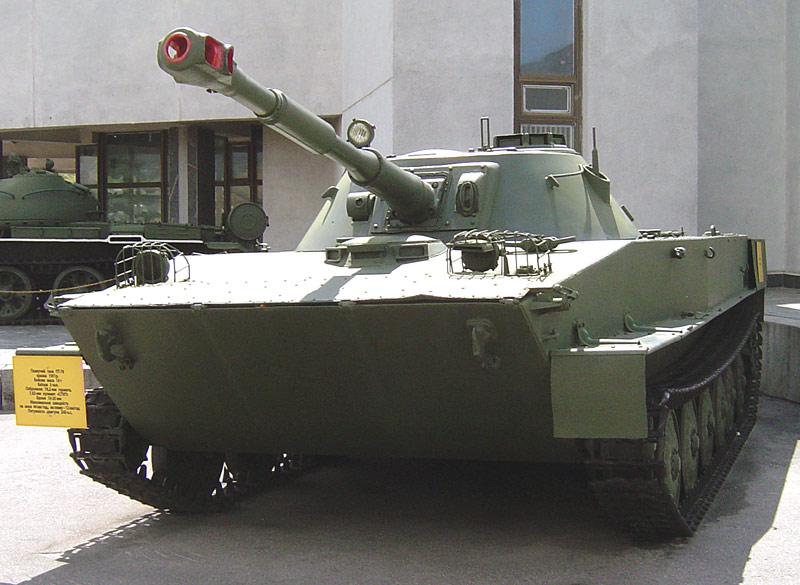
PT-76 light tank

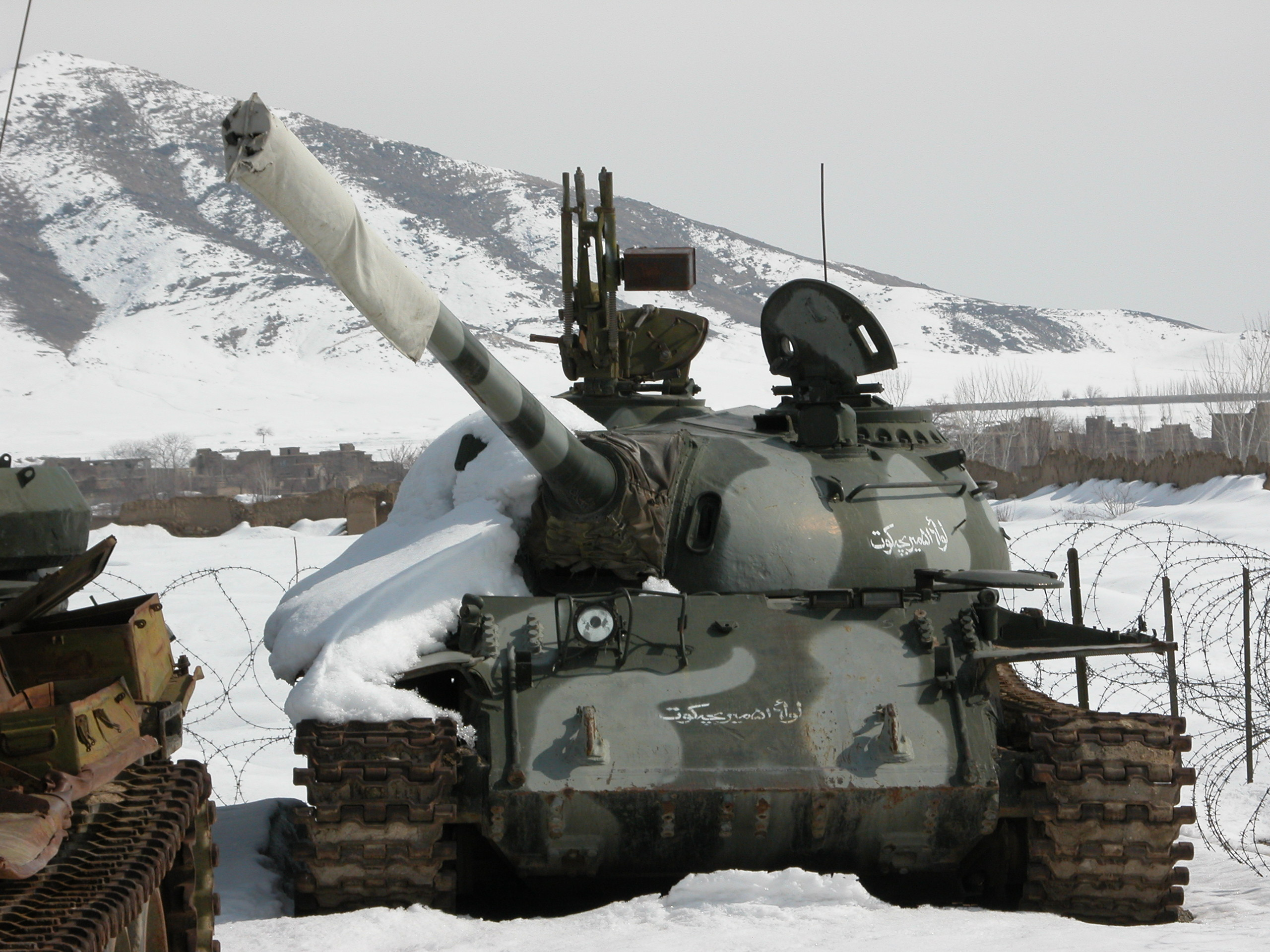
T-55

On October 7, 2001 the United States military began operation Operation Enduring Freedom, which was launched by the United States and United Kingdom in response to the September 11, 2001 attacks. The purpose for the entry into the Afghanistan conflict was stated to capture Osama bin Laden, destroy al-Qaeda, and remove the Taliban regime which had provided support and safe harbor to al-Qaeda. In the war, both the Taliban and forces allied with American troops had access to a wide array of Soviet tanks that fell into their hands, when the central government which had ordered them, collapsed after the Soviets left. 50 T-54s and 50 T-55s were ordered in 1961 from the Soviet Union and delivered between 1962 and 1964 (T-54s were previously in Soviet service). 200 T-54s were ordered in 1978 from the Soviet Union and delivered between 1978 and 1979 (the vehicles were previously in Soviet service). 705 T-55s were ordered in 1978 from the Soviet Union and delivered between 1978 and 1991 (the vehicles were previously in Soviet service). 50 Pt-76 light tanks were ordered in 1958 from the Soviet Union and delivered between 1959 and 1961. 1,000 T-54s, T-55s, T-62s and PT-76s were in service on 1 April 1992. Currently 600 T-55s are in service with the Military of Afghanistan but are to be replaced with M60 Pattons.

==== Iraq War ====
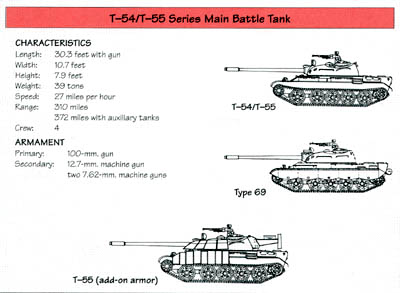
US Army recognition poster of T-54/55 series tanks

From the beginning of the war, the bulk of the resistance had been conducted by regular army units, equipped with older tanks such as T-54/55 tanks and T-62s. One division armed with the older tanks that faced the US forces were the 6th Armored Division of the Iraqi Army. It was equipped with T-55s and BMP-1s defending the control of key bridges over the Euphrates River and the Saddam Canal at Nasiriyah. Its tanks were decimated by US Marines with M1 Abrams, and the division as a unit rendered incapable for combat during the Battle of Nasiriyah in March 2003, during the invasion.

In addition to the T-54/55 and T-62 tanks that Iraq had, the most feared to US armoured forces were the T-72 tanks in the Iraqi forces. Only Republican Guard divisions were equipped with Iraqi-modified T-72s. Many of the Iraqi T-72s were dug-in or hidden in groves, and then used to ambush the US or British tanks. In the war, the Iraqi T-72s were the preferred target for Apache helicopters and A-10s, in an attempt to diminish the combat power of Republican Guard divisions. The only chance for the Asad Babil T-72s against American tanks was to lure them to close range combat, or trying to ambush them from dug-in positions.

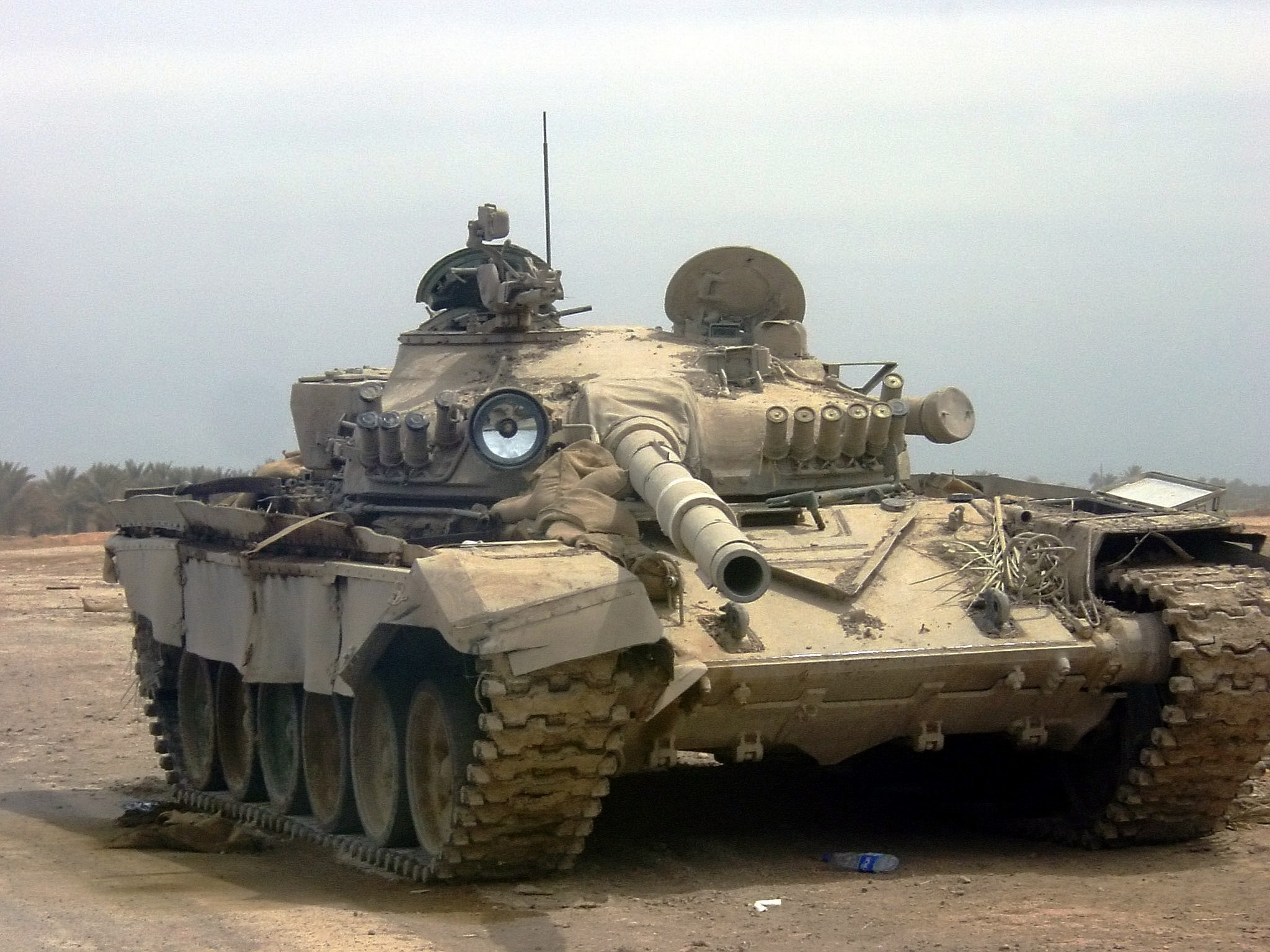
An Asad Babil abandoned after facing the final US thrust into Baghdad

But even in those conditions, the M1s usually prevailed, as proven in circumstances like the Battle of Baghdad, and the drive to the capital, where dozens of Iraqi MBTs were obliterated, or near Mahmoudiyah, south of Baghdad, April 3, 2003, (Iraqi Freedom) when US tanks engaged their counterparts from just 50 yards, shattering seven enemy T-72s without losses. These encounters also exposed the very poor marksmanship of the Iraqi gunners, in part due to the shortage of modern night-vision and range-finder assets. The Iraqis, however, had no idea they could be detected and destroyed at a range of nearly 2 miles (3.2 km) by the M1 Abrams, and the Challenger.

The Lion of Babylon T-72 was utterly outclassed by the M1 Abrams, the Challenger and by any other contemporary Western main battle tank during the 2003 invasion of Iraq. The last operational Asad Babils were destroyed by the successive waves of American armored incursions on the Iraqi capital or abandoned by their crews after the fall of Baghdad, several of them without firing a single shot, after the collapse of the regime.

==== Russo-Ukrainian War ====
Russia invaded Ukraine and occupied its Crimean peninsula in February 2014, and started a war in the Donbas region of Ukraine's east in May. In February 2022, it escalated to an all-out invasion of Ukraine.

Russia initially denied its command and control over "separatist militias" in Ukraine significantly manned by Russian volunteers and soldiers, supplying them with Ukrainian-built T-64 tanks captured in Crimea and from its own Soviet-era stocks, as well as T-72. As Ukrainian forces gained the upper hand and forced the militias to withdraw towards the Russian border, from August 2014 Russia sent the Russian Armed Forces into Ukraine, especially at the significant battles of Ilovaisk and Debaltseve, to create a stable line of contact.

In 2022 Russia escalated the conflict into the largest European war since WWII. Ukrainian forces halted Russian advances, and then enjoyed a number of military successes as Western military aid began to roll in.

Foreign military aid to Ukraine in 2022 included upgraded T-72 and T-55 tanks from a number of former Soviet-bloc states and other donors, and eventually newer Western-designed tanks. However, the single largest provider of tanks was Russia, as the Ukrainians captured thousands of Russian tanks and put many of them into service.

The following were among the aid delivered or committed to Ukraine:

- Over 50 T-72M1, by Czechia and Germany, from stocks in Bulgaria and Czechia, April 2022, May or June 2022, and April 2023
- Over 250 T-72M(R) and T-72M1(R), Poland, from April 2022
- 31 T-72A, North Macedonia, July or August 2022
- 28 M-55S, by Germany from Slovenian stocks, October 2022
- 105 T-72EA, purchased by Denmark, Czechia, the Netherlands, and the United States, restored or upgraded in Czechia, from January 2023
- 60 PT-91, Poland, from April 2023

Meanwhile Russia increased its military production, producing some new T-90M, refurbishing many old T-90, T-80, and T-72 tanks, but with difficulty due to sanctions limiting access to components as diverse as digital electronics and ball bearings. Within three months, Russia started to bring T-62 tanks back into service and upgraded some to the new T-62M Obr. 2021 and T-62MV Obr. 2021 standard. In early 2023 Russian T-55 tanks were seen being used for training and apparently being sent into combat service. Russian authorities said the T-14 Armata was tested in Ukraine, but still hasn't entered service. In 2024 it was determined that Russia did not have any T80 and T90 left in storage and the army was mainly supplied by newly made T-90's and a trickle of refurbished T72's.

== Overview per tank ==
(Only tanks that were built in significant numbers are listed.)

=== T-24 ===
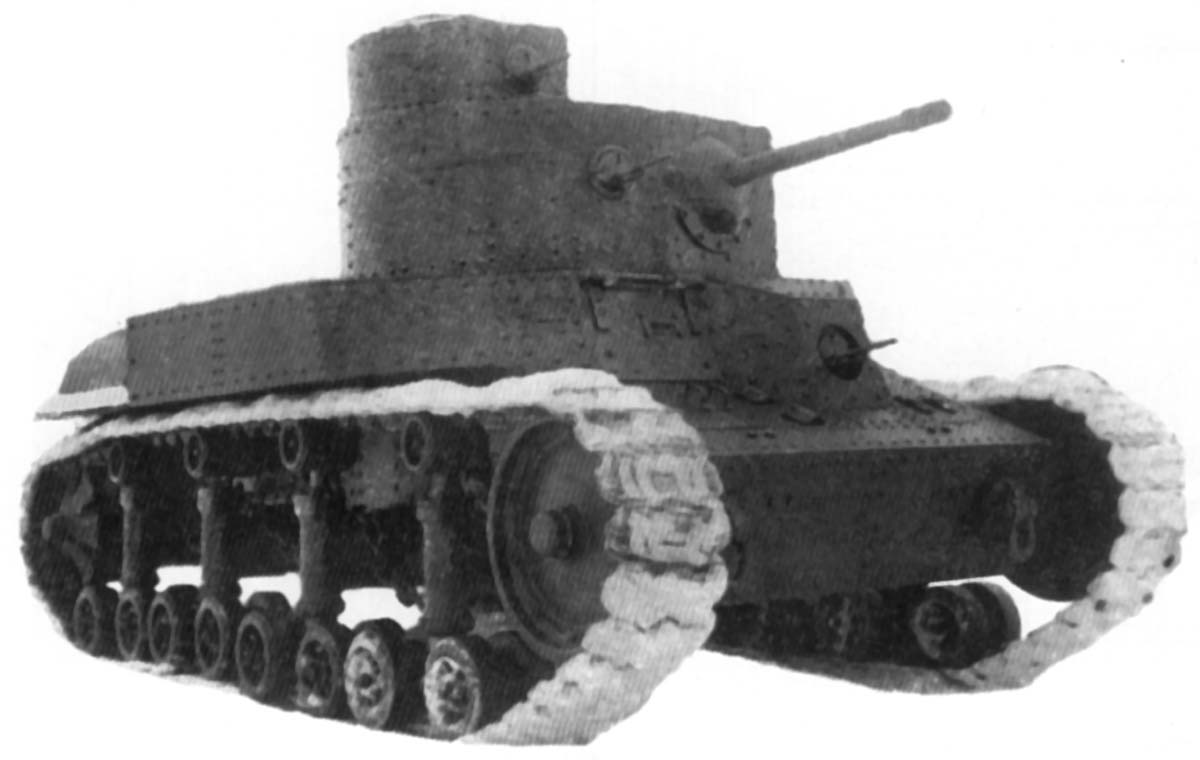
T-24 Medium tank.

The T-24 was a Soviet medium tank built in 1931. Only twenty-four tanks were built, and was not used in combat. This was the first tank produced at the KhPZ factory in Ukraine, which was later responsible for the very successful T-34 and T-54 Soviet tanks. The T-24's suspension was used successfully in the Soviet Union's first purpose-built artillery tractors.

The T-24's main armament was a 45 mm gun. It had a ball-mount 7.62 mm DT machine gun in the hull, another in the turret, and a third in a secondary turret atop the main turret. The tank was well-armoured for its time, but suffered from problems with the engine and transmission.

=== T-26 ===
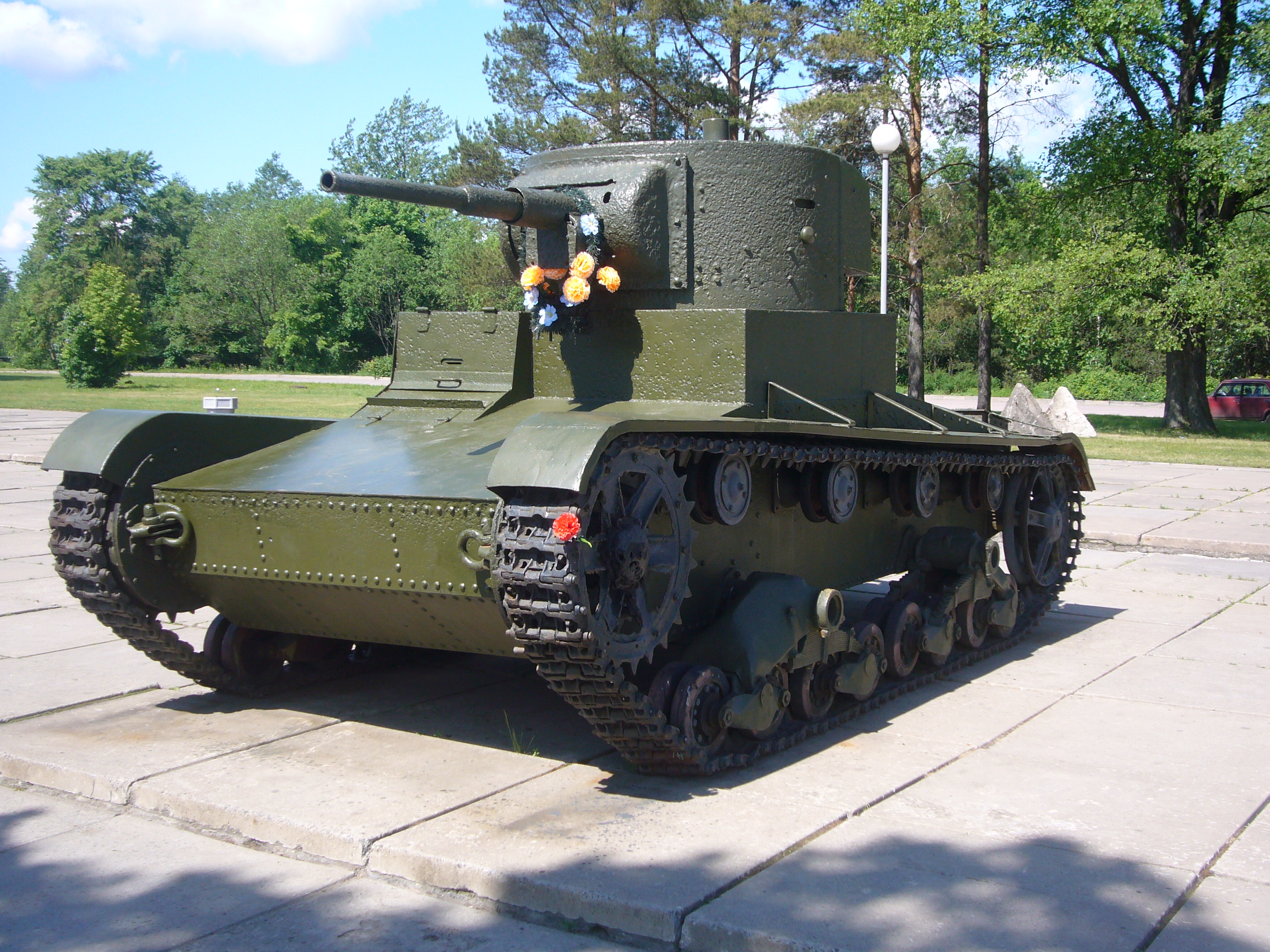
T-26 light tank.

The T-26 tank was a Soviet light infantry tank used during many conflicts of the 1930s and during World War II. It was a development of the British Vickers 6-Ton tank and is widely considered one of the most successful tank designs of the 1930s.

It was produced in greater numbers than any other tank of the period, with more than 11,000 produced. During the 1930s, the Soviet Union developed approximately 53 variants of the T-26, including other combat vehicles based on its chassis. Twenty-three of these were mass-produced.

Though nearly obsolete by the beginning of World War II, the T-26 was the most important tank of the Spanish Civil War and played a significant role during the Battle of Lake Khasan in 1938 as well as in the Winter War. The T-26 was the most numerous tank in the Red Army's armoured force during the German invasion of the Soviet Union in June 1941. Combat experience with the T-26 showed the Soviet military that, even though the T-26's gun could defeat the armor of opposing tanks it met in battle, its armor was too thin and the gun caliber was too small as it often encountered entrenched anti-tank guns demanding a larger caliber that could fire a larger high-explosive shell. The Soviet T-26 light tanks were last used in August 1945, in Manchuria.

The T-26 was reliable and simple to maintain, and its design was continually modernised between 1931 and 1941. However, no new models of the T-26 were developed after 1940.

=== BT tank ===
The BT tanks were a series of cavalry tanks produced in large numbers between 1932 and 1941. They were lightly armoured, but reasonably well-armed for their time, and had the best mobility of all contemporary tanks of the world. They outclassed their Japanese opponents in the Soviet–Japanese border conflicts (1938–1939) but thousands were lost during the German invasion in 1941 and was rare after 1942. It was further developed to, and replaced by the T-34.

=== T-28 ===
The T-28 was a three-turreted medium tank first manufactured in 1932. A total of 502 T-28 tanks were made 1933–1941. Combat experience in the Winter War led to an upgrade with appliqué armor. The up-armored T-28e tanks were used to break through the Finnish Mannerheim Line, ending the Winter War in 1940. Most of the 400 remaining T-28 tanks were lost during the German invasion in 1941. The design was not particularly successful in combat, but the building and designing of it gave the Soviet heavy industry important experience in manufacturing medium tanks. The failure of this multi-turreted tank guided the switch to the more successful, single-turret T-34 medium tank.

=== T-34 ===
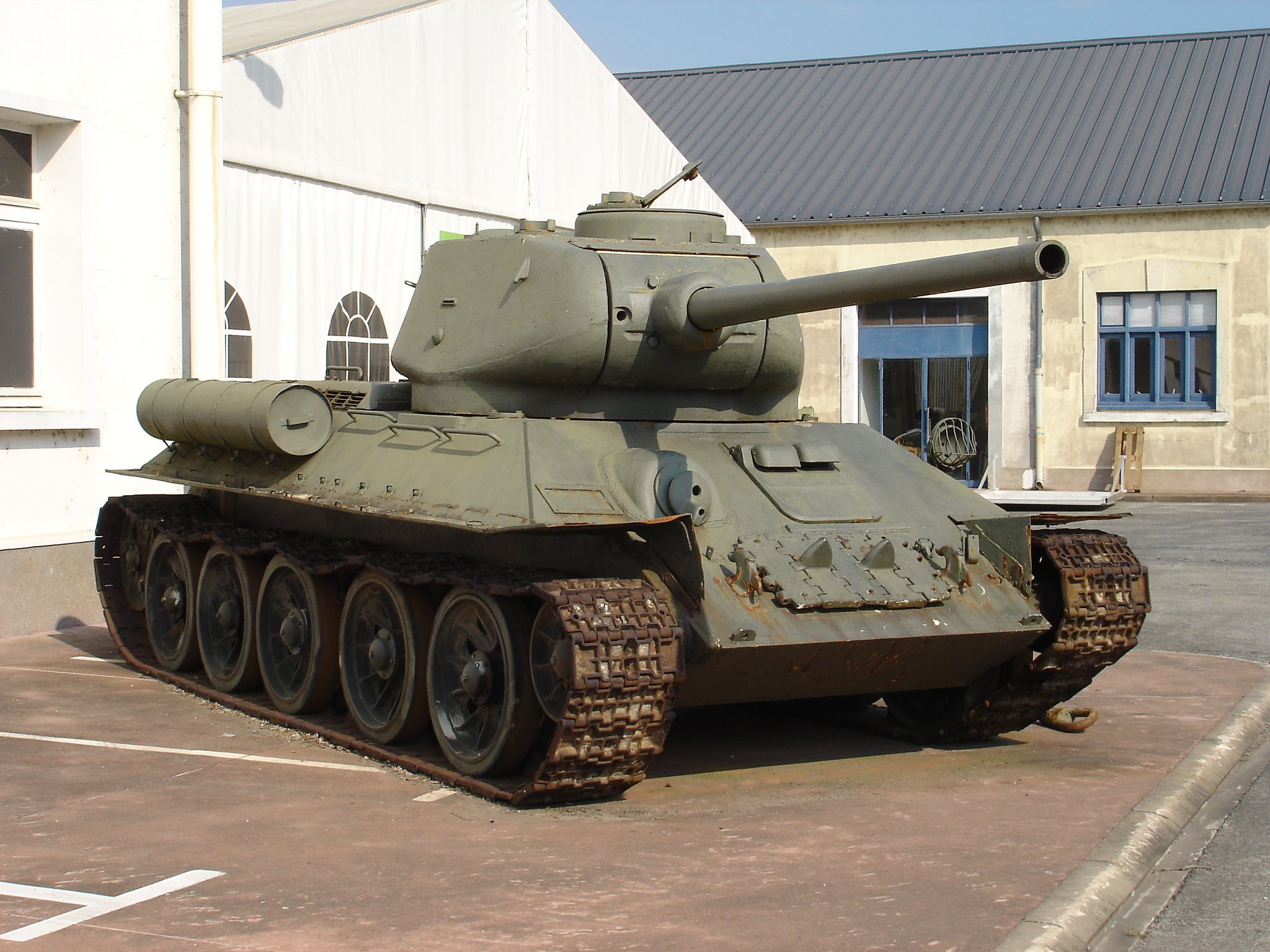
T-34-85 at Musée des Blindés

The T-34 was a medium tank produced from 1940 to 1958. Although its armour and armament were surpassed by later tanks of the era, it has been often credited as the most effective, efficient and influential design of World War II. First produced at the KhPZ factory in Kharkov (Kharkiv, Ukraine), it was the mainstay of Soviet armoured forces throughout World War II, and widely exported afterward. It was the most-produced tank of the war, and the second most-produced tank of all time, after its successor, the T-54/55 series. As of 2024, the T-34 is still in service in at least seven countries around the globe.

=== T-35 ===
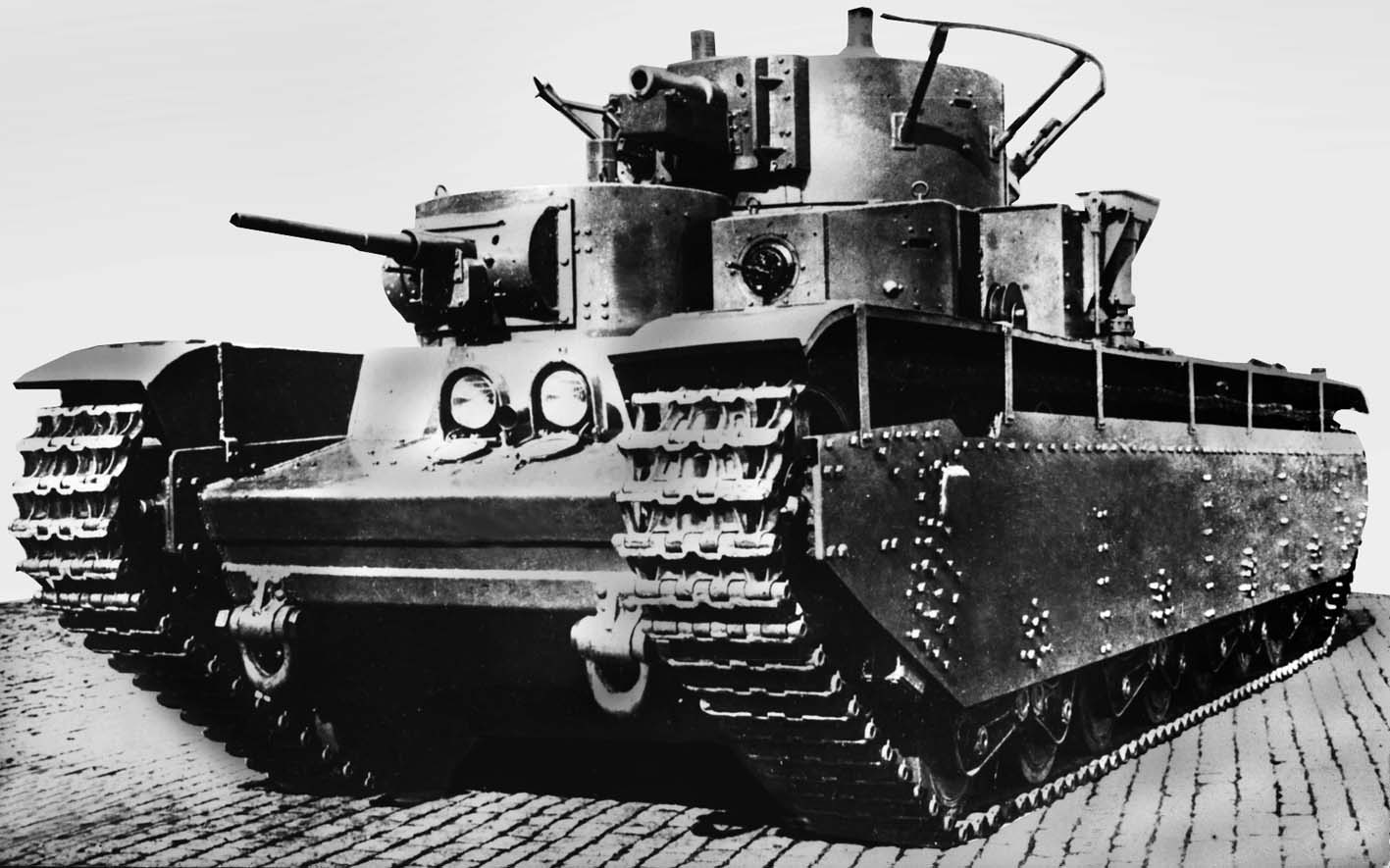
T-35 Heavy tank.

The T-35 was a Soviet multi-turreted heavy tank of the interwar period and early Second World War in limited production and service with the Red Army. It was the only five-turreted heavy tank in the world to reach production but proved to be slow and mechanically unreliable. Most of the T-35 tanks still operational at the time of Operation Barbarossa were lost due to mechanical failure rather than enemy action.

Outwardly it was large but internally the spaces were cramped with the fighting compartments separated from each other. Some of the turrets obscured the entrance hatches. The failure of the T-35 and other multi-turreted tanks in the Winter War (1939-1940) led to the development of the more successful Kliment Voroshilov heavy tank (single turret).

=== T-37 ===
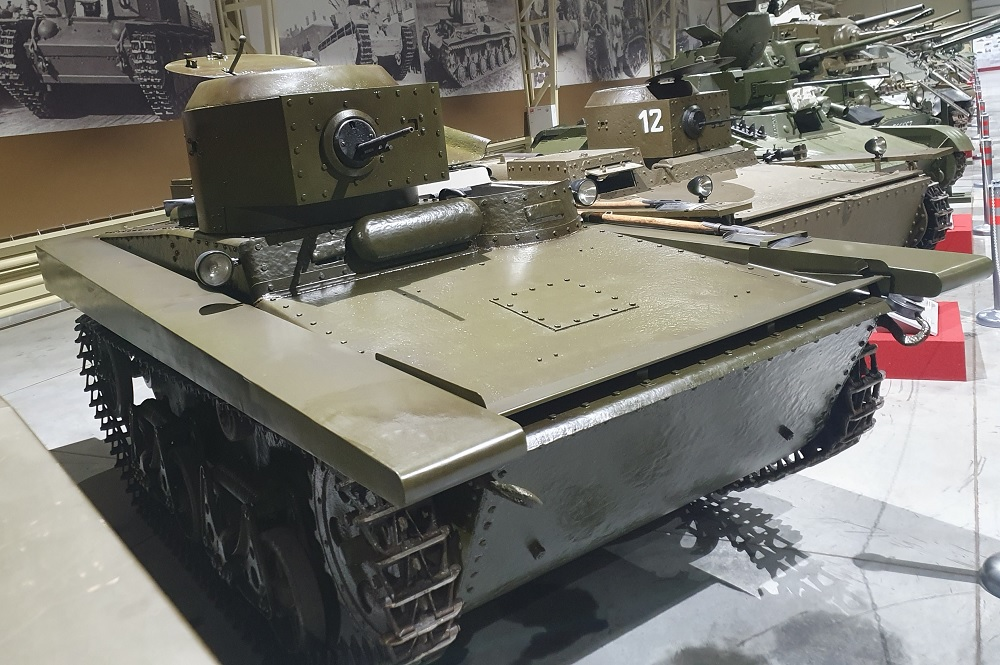
T-37 on display

The T-37A was light amphibious tank. The tank is often referred to as the T-37, although that designation was used by a different tank which never left the prototype stage. The T-37A was the first series of mass-produced fully amphibious tanks in the world.

The tank was first created in 1932, based on the British Vickers tankette and other operational amphibious tanks. The tank was mass-produced starting in 1933 up until 1936, when it was replaced with the more modern T-38, based on the T-37A. Overall, after four years of production, 2552 T-37A's were produced, including the original prototypes.

In the Red Army, they were used to perform tasks in communication, reconnaissance, and as defense units on the march, as well as active infantry support on the battlefield. The T-37A were used in large numbers during the Soviet invasion of Poland and in the Winter War against Finland. The T-37A was also used by the Soviets in the beginning of the Great Patriotic War, but most of them were quickly lost. Surviving tanks of that type fought on the front lines until 1944, and were used in training and auxiliary defense until the end of World War II.

=== T-38 ===
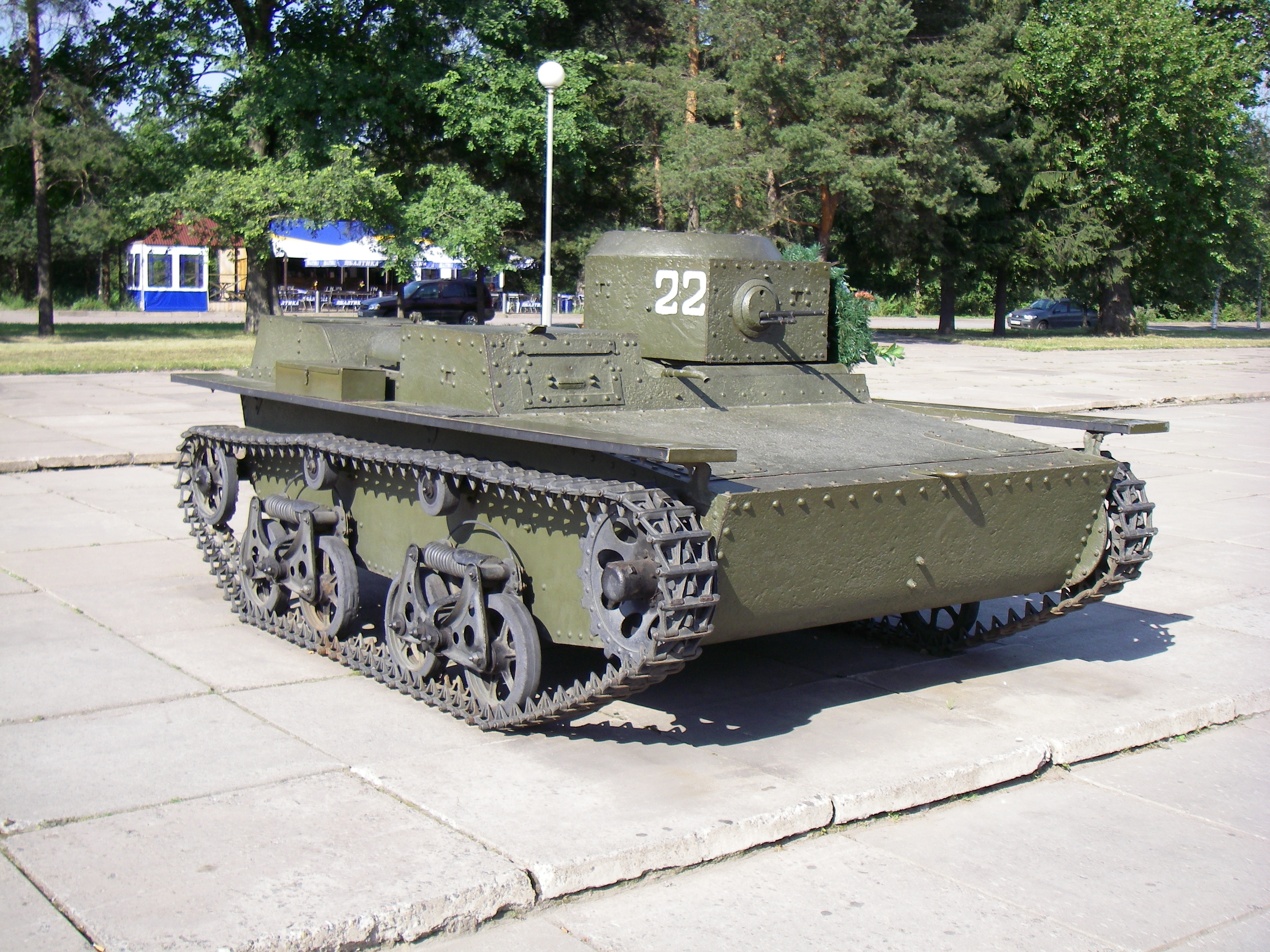
T-38 amphibious scout tank.

The T-38 amphibious scout tank was a light amphibious tank that was used in World War II.

The T-38 was a development of the earlier T-37, based in turn on the French AMR 33 light reconnaissance tank. The tank was powered by a standard GAZ (Ford) engine and was cheap to produce. Buoyancy was achieved by the large-volume hull and large fenders. In water, the vehicle was propelled by a small three-bladed propeller mounted at the rear.

The tanks were intended for use for reconnaissance and infantry support. As a scout tank the T-38 had the advantages of very low silhouette and good mobility, due to its ability to swim. The T-38 was also intended to be air-portable; during the Kyiv maneuvers in 1936, the tanks were transported by Tupolev TB-3 bombers, mounted under the fuselage. Infantry battalions were each issued 38 T-38s, with 50 being designated for each airborne armored battalions. However, the thin armor and single machine gun armament made the tank of only limited use in combat while the lack of radios in most T-38s was a serious limitation in a recon vehicle. The T-38's limitations were recognized, and it would have been replaced by the T-40, but the outbreak of the Second World War meant that only a few T-40s were produced.

Around 1,500 T-38s were built, illustrating the importance of amphibious scout tanks to the Red Army. Some were up-gunned with a 20 mm ShVAK cannon, and designated the T-38RT.

=== T-40 ===
The T-40 amphibious scout tank was a light amphibious tank used by the Soviet Union during World War II. Amphibious capability was important to the Red Army, as evidenced by the production of over 1,500 amphibious tanks in the 1930s. The T-40 was intended to replace the aging T-37 and T-38 tank light amphibians. It was a superior design, but due to the pressures of war the Soviets favored the production of simpler tank designs, and only a small number of T-40s were built. The last batch of T-40s built had BM-8-24 Katyusha rocket racks mounted instead of turrets. This version provided a mobile mount for a 24-rail multiple-launch rocket system, firing 82 mm unguided rockets.

=== T-50 ===
The T-50 light infantry tank was built by the Soviet Union at the beginning of World War II. Development of the T-50 started as the SP project (Soprovzhdeniya Pekhoty, ‘Infantry Support’) in 1939. The design bureau was gutted during the Great Purge, and was unable to continue the project, so it was transferred to the K.E. Voroshilov Factory Number 174 in May 1940. Troyanov completed the T-50 design in January 1941 and production was authorized, but due to technical problems, it was unable to proceed. The design for this vehicle had some advanced features, but was complicated and expensive, and only a short production run of 69 tanks was completed. Furthermore, even before it was ready for mass-production wartime experience invalidated the underlying concept of light tanks.

=== T-60 ===
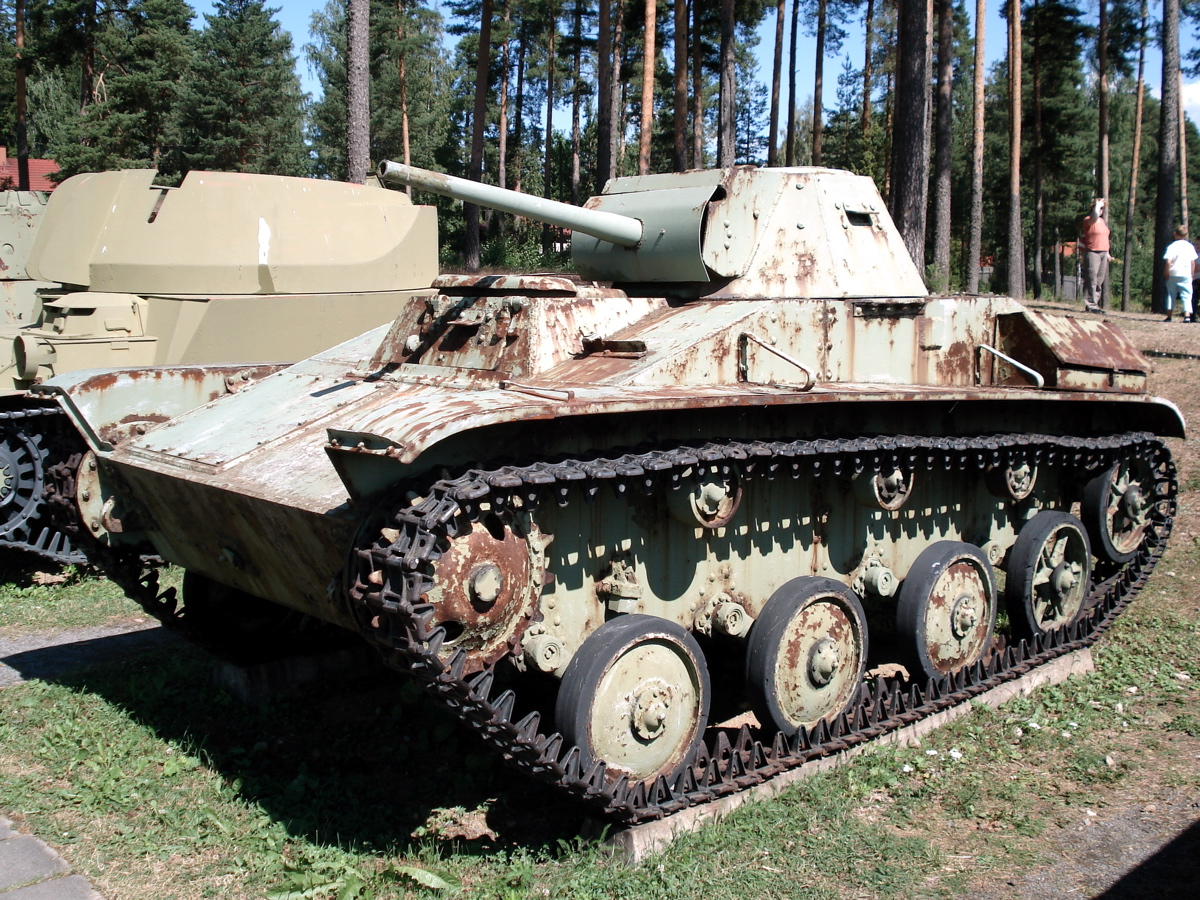
T-60 at the Parola Tank Museum.

The T-60 scout tank was a light tank produced by the Soviet Union from 1941 to 1942. In this time over 6,292 were built. The tank was designed to replace the obsolete T-38 amphibious scout tank.

Although at first intended to carry a 12.7 mm machine gun like the T-40, the armament was later upgraded to the 20 mm TNSh cannon, a tank version of the ShVAK, on the advisement of the People's Commissar for Tanks Industry, Vyacheslav Malyshev. This weapon could penetrate 15 mm of perpendicular armour at 500 m range which proved inadequate against the newer uparmored German tank designs thus attempts were made in 1942 to re-arm the T-60 with the 37 mm ZIS-19 cannon but were abandoned due to the Soviet Union's shortage of 37 mm ammunition.

The T-60 was also used in the design of the experimental T-90 antiaircraft tank. This project switched to the T-70 light tank and was finally cancelled without any production.

=== T-70 ===
The T-70 light tank was used by the Red Army during World War II, replacing both the T-60 scout tank for reconnaissance and the T-50 light infantry tank for infantry support. The T-80 light tank was a more advanced version of the T-70 with a two-man turret—it was only produced in very small numbers when light tank production was abandoned. The T-90 self-propelled anti-aircraft gun was a prototype vehicle with twin machine guns, based on the T-70 chassis.

The T-70 was armed with a 45 mm L/46 gun Model 38 with forty-five rounds carried, and a coaxial 7.62-mm DT machine gun. The tank was operated by a driver and a commander who loaded and fired the gun. Armour thickness on the turret front was 60 mm, hull front and sides: 45 mm, rear and turret sides: 35 mm, roof and bottom: 10 mm.

T-70s were put into production in March 1942 at Zavod No. 37, and along with T-60 production at GAZ and Zavod No. 38. They completely replaced T-60 production in September 1942, although that tank remained in use until the end of the war. Production ended in October 1943, with 8,226 vehicles completed.

=== Kliment Voroshilov tank ===
The Kliment Voroshilov (KV) tanks were a series of heavy tanks that had extremely heavy armour protection during the early part of World War II, especially during the first year of the German invasion. Although it was heavily armoured, larger guns and thicker armour introduced by the enemy made it less effective over time. The series was discontinued as it could not be upgraded with better guns or heavier armour but served as a basis for the later Iosif Stalin heavy tank.

=== Iosif Stalin tank ===
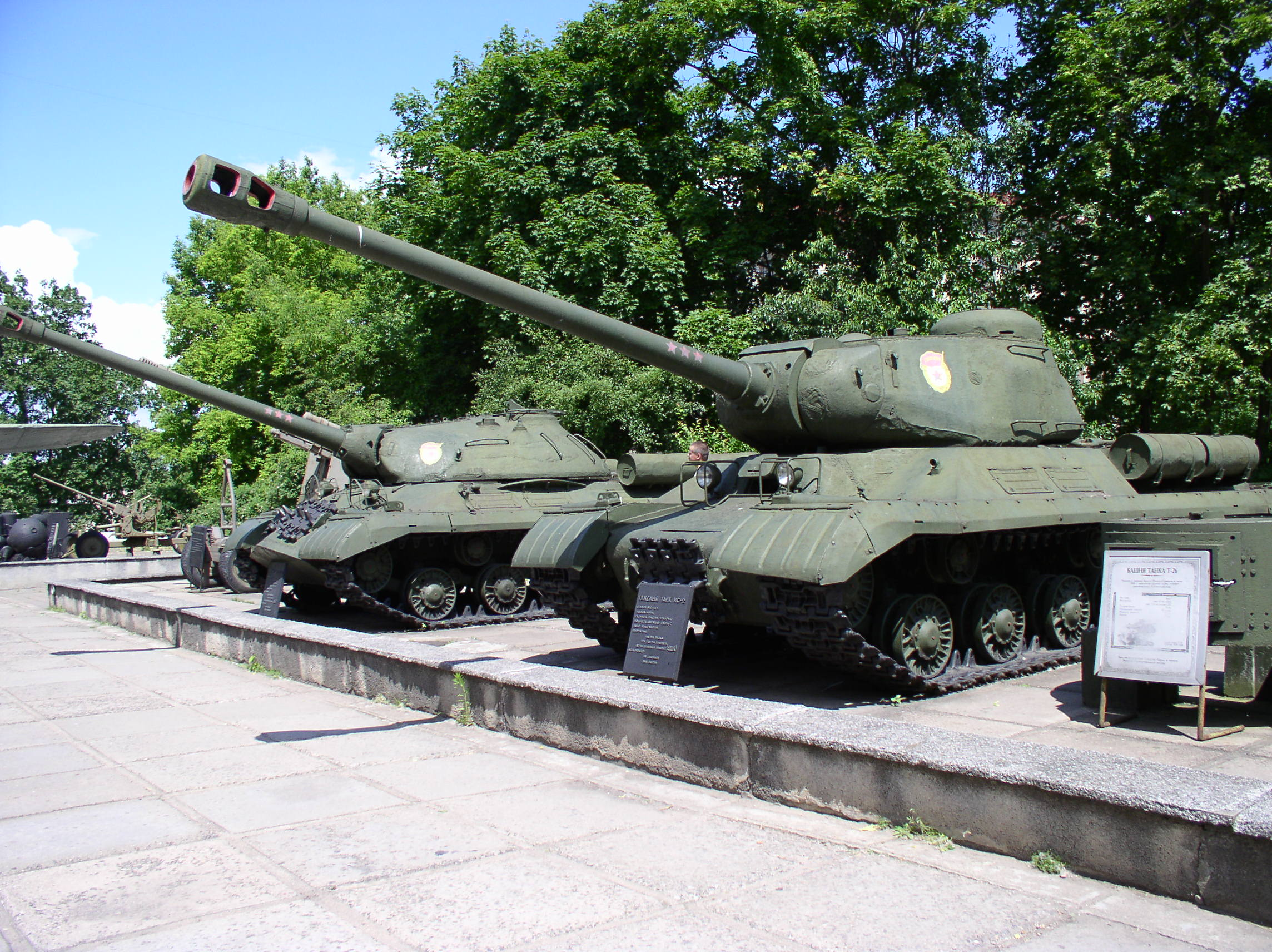
IS-2 mod. 1943 (modernized) (front) and IS-3 at the Belarusian Great Patriotic War Museum.

The Iosif Stalin tank (or IS tank, named after the Soviet leader Joseph Stalin) was a heavy tank developed by the Soviet Union during World War II. The tanks in the series are also sometimes called JS or ИС tanks.

The heavy tank was designed with thick armour to counter the German 88 mm guns, and carried a main gun that was capable of defeating the German Tiger and Panther tanks. It was mainly a breakthrough tank, firing a heavy high-explosive shell that was useful against entrenchments and bunkers. The IS-2 was put into service in April 1944, and was used as a spearhead in the Battle of Berlin by the Red Army in the final stage of the war.

=== T10/IS-10/IS-8 ===
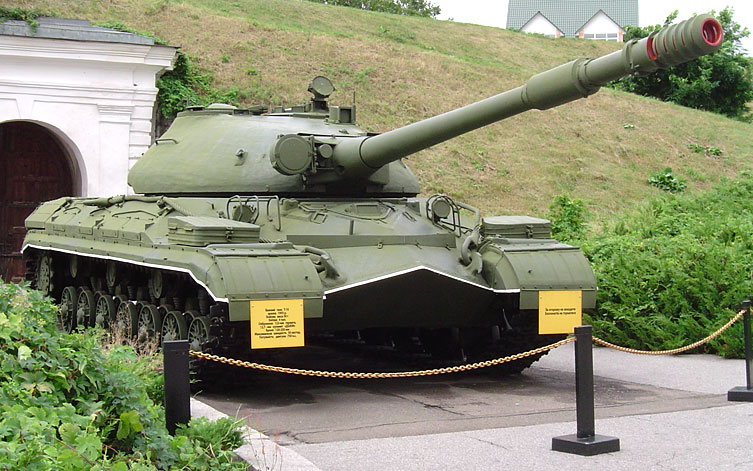
T-10 at the Museum of The History of Ukraine in World War II.

The T-10 (also known as Obyekt 730) was a Soviet heavy tank of the Cold War, the final development of the KV and IS tank series. It was accepted into production in 1952 as the IS-10 (Iosif Stalin, Russian form of Joseph Stalin), but due to the political climate in the wake of Stalin's death in 1953, it was renamed T-10.

The biggest differences from its direct ancestor, the IS-3, were a longer hull, seven pairs of road wheels instead of six, a larger turret mounting a new gun with fume extractor, an improved diesel engine, and increased armour. General performance was similar, although the T-10 could carry more ammunition.

T-10s (like the IS tanks they replaced) were deployed in independent tank regiments belonging to armies, and independent tank battalions belonging to divisions. These independent tank units could be attached to mechanized units, to support infantry operations and perform breakthroughs.

=== T-54/55 ===
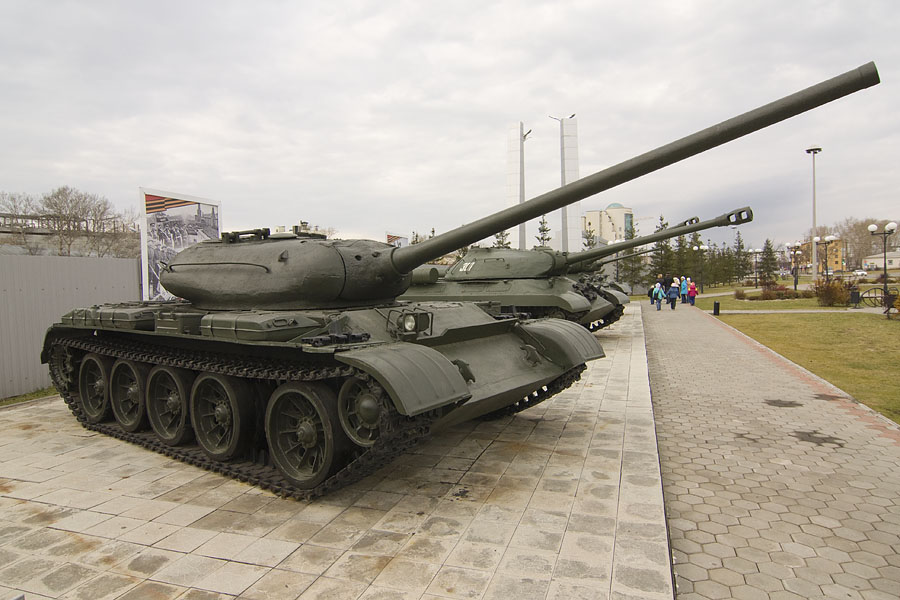
The original T-54-1 tank.

The T-54 and T-55 tanks were a series of main battle tanks designed in the Soviet Union. The first T-54 prototype appeared in March 1945, just before the end of the Second World War. The T-54 entered full production in 1947 and became the main tank for armored units of the Soviet Army, armies of the Warsaw Pact countries, and others. T-54s and T-55s were involved in many of the world's armed conflicts during the late 20th century.

T-54/55 tanks were replaced by the T-62, T-72, T-64 and T-80 in the Soviet and Russian Armies, but many remain in use by up to 50 other armies worldwide, some having received sophisticated retrofitting.

Soviet tanks never directly faced their NATO Cold War adversaries in Europe. However, the T-54/55's first appearance in the west in 1960 spurred the United States to develop the M60. The T-54 did fight in Vietnam where it was outperformed by the M48A3 Patton and even the M41 Walker Bulldog. It also fought in the Arab-Israeli wars where it was outperformed by the Centurion, M48 Patton, M60 Patton and even upgraded M4 Shermans.

The T-54/55 series eventually became the most-produced tank in history. Estimated production numbers for the series range from 86,000 to 100,000.

=== PT-76 ===
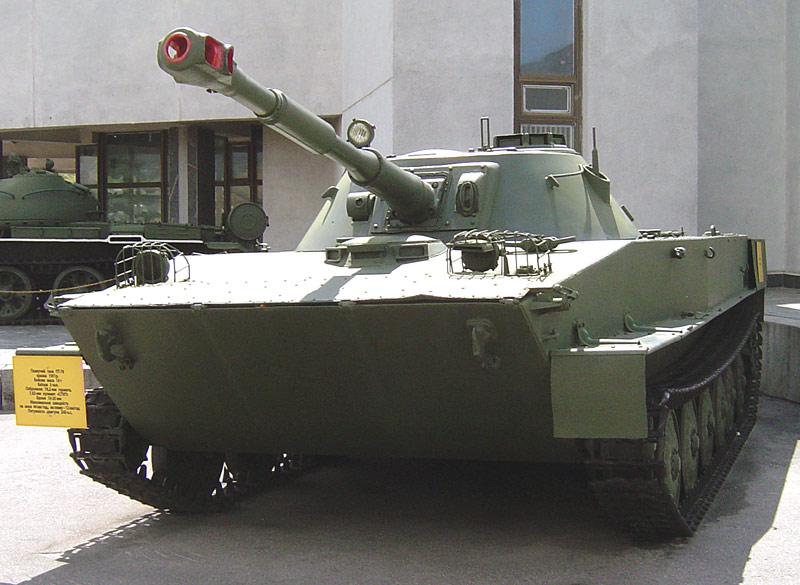
PT-76 amphibious tank on display near the Museum of The History of Ukraine in World War II.

The PT-76 is a Soviet light amphibious tank which was introduced in the early 1950s and soon became the standard reconnaissance tank of the Soviet Army and the other Warsaw Pact armed forces. It was widely exported to other friendly states, like India, Iraq, North Korea and North Vietnam. Overall, some 25 countries used the PT-76.

The tank's full name is Floating Tank–76 (Плавающий Танк, Plavayushchiy Tank, or ПТ-76). 76 stands for the caliber of the main armament: the 76.2 mm D-56T series rifled tank gun.

The PT-76 is used in the reconnaissance and fire-support roles. Its chassis served as the basis for a number of other vehicle designs, many of them amphibious, including the BTR-50 armored personnel carrier, the ZSU-23-4 self-propelled antiaircraft gun, the ASU-85 airborne self-propelled gun and the 2K12 Kub anti-aircraft missile launch vehicle.

=== T-62 ===
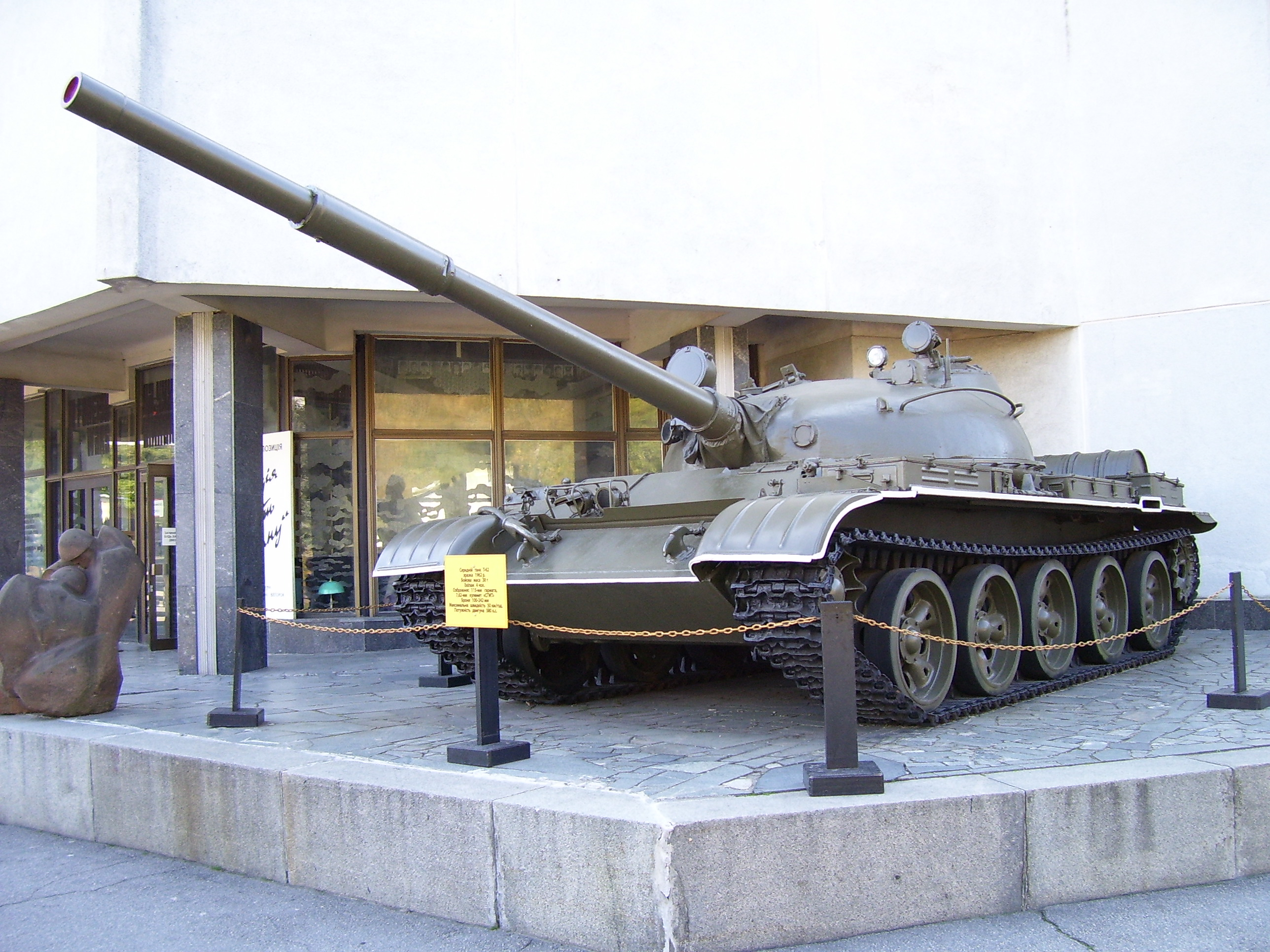
T-62 at the Museum of The History of Ukraine in World War II.

The T-62 is a Soviet main battle tank, a further development of the T-55. Its 115 mm gun was the first smoothbore tank gun in use. Although the T-62 is very similar to the T-55 and makes use of many of the same parts, there are some differences. Those include the hull, which is a few centimeters longer and wider, the different road wheels, and differences in characteristic uneven gaps between roadwheels. Unlike the T-54 and T-55 main battle tanks, the gaps between the last three pairs of roadwheels are larger than the rest. (Perrett 1987:37-38)

Like the T-54 and T-55, the T-62 has an unditching beam mounted at the rear of the hull. The tank can be fitted with a thin snorkel for operational usage and a large diameter snorkel for training. The thin snorkel can be disassembled and carried in the back of the turret when not used. The commander's cupola is located on the left of the top of the turret. The loader has a single piece hatch located on the right side of the turret and further back than the commander's cupola. The loader's hatch has a periscope vision block that can be used to view ahead and behind the vehicle. The commander's cupola has four periscopes, two of which are located in the hatch cover while the other two are located in the forward part of the cupola. The driver has a single piece hatch located on the left front of the vehicle, directly in front of the left side of the turret. The tank uses the same sights and vision devices as the T-55 except for the gunner, who received a new TSh-2B-41 sight which has x4 or x7 magnification. It is mounted coaxially with an optic rangefinder.

The T-62 was produced between 1961 and 1975. It became a standard tank in the Soviet arsenal, partly replacing the T-55, although that tank continued to be manufactured in the Soviet Union and elsewhere after T-62 production was halted. The T-54/55 and T-62 were later replaced in front-line service by the T-64 and T-72. The T-62 fought in the Yom-Kippur war where it was outperformed by the Centurion, M48 Patton and M60 Patton. It even proved vulnerable to the M51 Super Sherman, an upgraded variant of the M4 Sherman of World War II.

=== T-64 ===
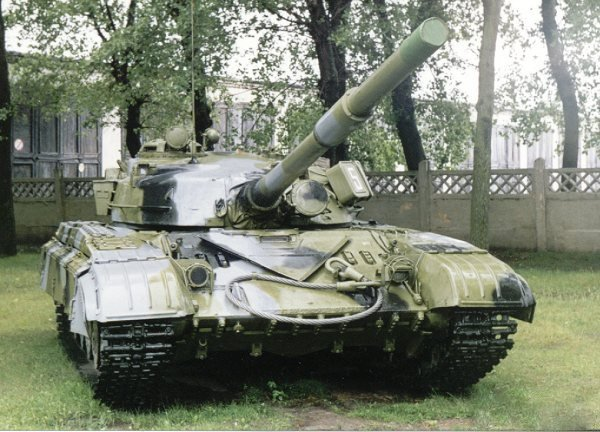
T-64A tank

The T-64 is a Soviet main battle tank, introduced in the early 1960s. It was used solely by the Soviet Army in its front-line divisions and was a more advanced counterpart to the T-62. Although the T-62 and the famed T-72 used more widely and generally developed more, it was the T-64 that formed the basis of more modern Soviet tank designs like the T-80.

A revolutionary feature of the T-64 is the incorporation of an automatic loader for its 125 mm gun, allowing a crewmember's position to be omitted, and helping to keep the size and weight of the tank down. Tank troopers would joke that the designers had finally caught up with their unofficial hymn, "Three Tankers"—the song had been written to commemorate the crewmen fighting in the Battle of Khalkhin Gol, in 3-man BT-5 tanks in 1939.

The T-64 also pioneered other Soviet tank technology: the T-64A model of 1967 introduced the 125 mm smoothbore gun, and the T-64B of 1976 would be able to fire a guided antitank missile through its gun barrel.

The T-64 design was further developed as the gas turbine-powered T-80 main battle tank. The turret of the T-64B would be used in the improved T-80U and T-80UD, and an advanced version of its diesel engine would power T-80UD and T-84 tanks built in Ukraine.

Upgraded models of the T-64 continue to be used by Ukrainian Ground Forces (T-64BV, T-64BM Bulat, T-64BV Model 2017, and T-64BM2 Bulat), Ukrainian Naval Infantry (T64BV) and the National Guard of Ukraine (T-64, T-64BV, and T-64BM).

=== T-72 ===
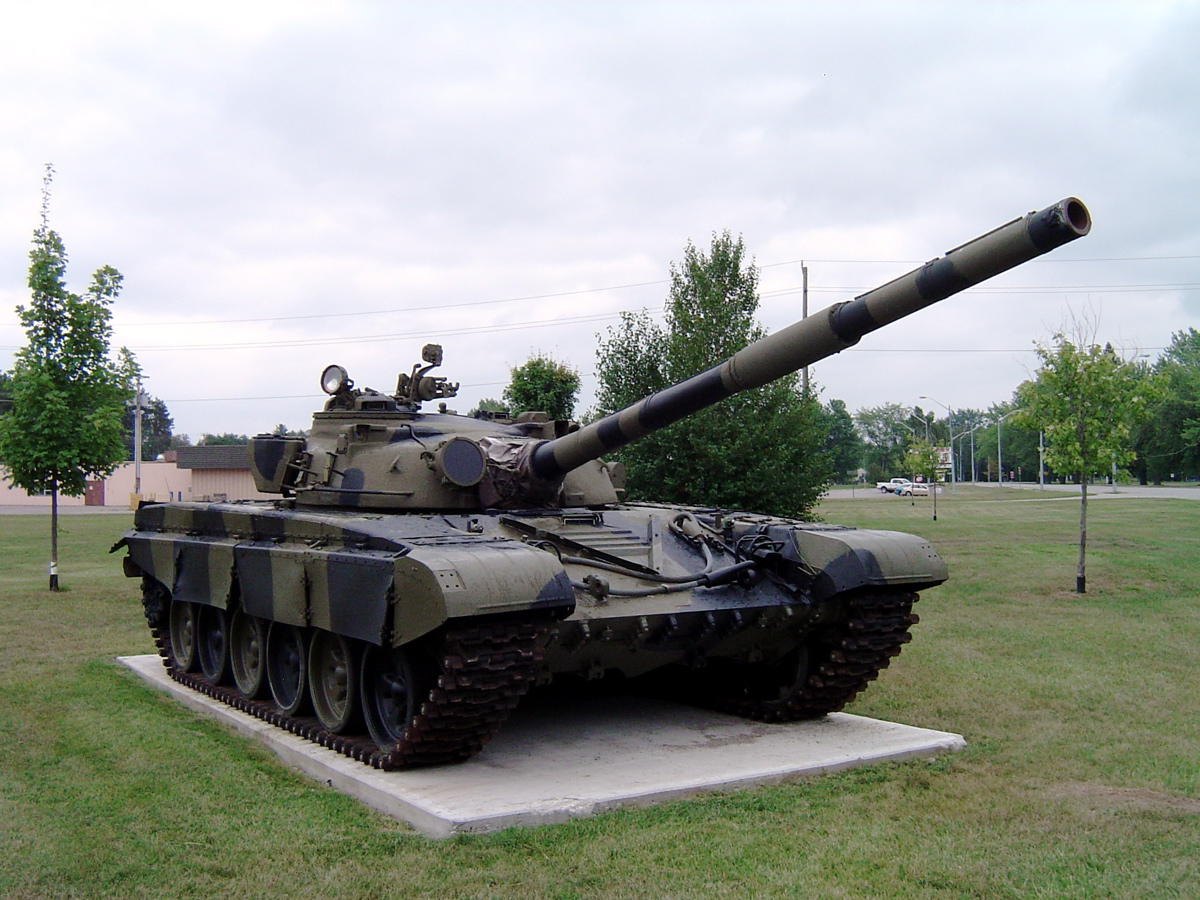
T-72 tank at Borden Museum in Canada

The T-72 is a Soviet-designed main battle tank that entered production in 1970. It is a further development of the T-62 with some features of the T-64A (to which it was a parallel design) and has been further developed as the T-90. Chronologically, and in design terms, it belongs to the same generation of tanks as the US M60 series, German Leopard 1, and British Chieftain tank.

The T-72 was the most common tank used by the Soviet Army from the 1970s to the collapse of the Soviet Union. It was also exported to other Warsaw Pact countries, as well as Finland, India, Iran, Iraq, Syria and Yugoslavia, as well as being copied elsewhere, both with and without licenses.

The Yugoslavs upgraded the T-72 in the new and more advanced M-84, and sold hundreds of them around the world during the 1980s. The Iraqis called theirs the Lion of Babylon (Asad Babil), though the Iraqis assembled theirs from "spare parts" sold to them by the Russians as a means of evading the UN-imposed weapons embargo. More modern derivatives include the Polish PT-91 Twardy and Russian T-90. Several countries, including Russia and Ukraine, also offer modernization packages for older T-72s.

=== T-80 Main Battle Tank ===
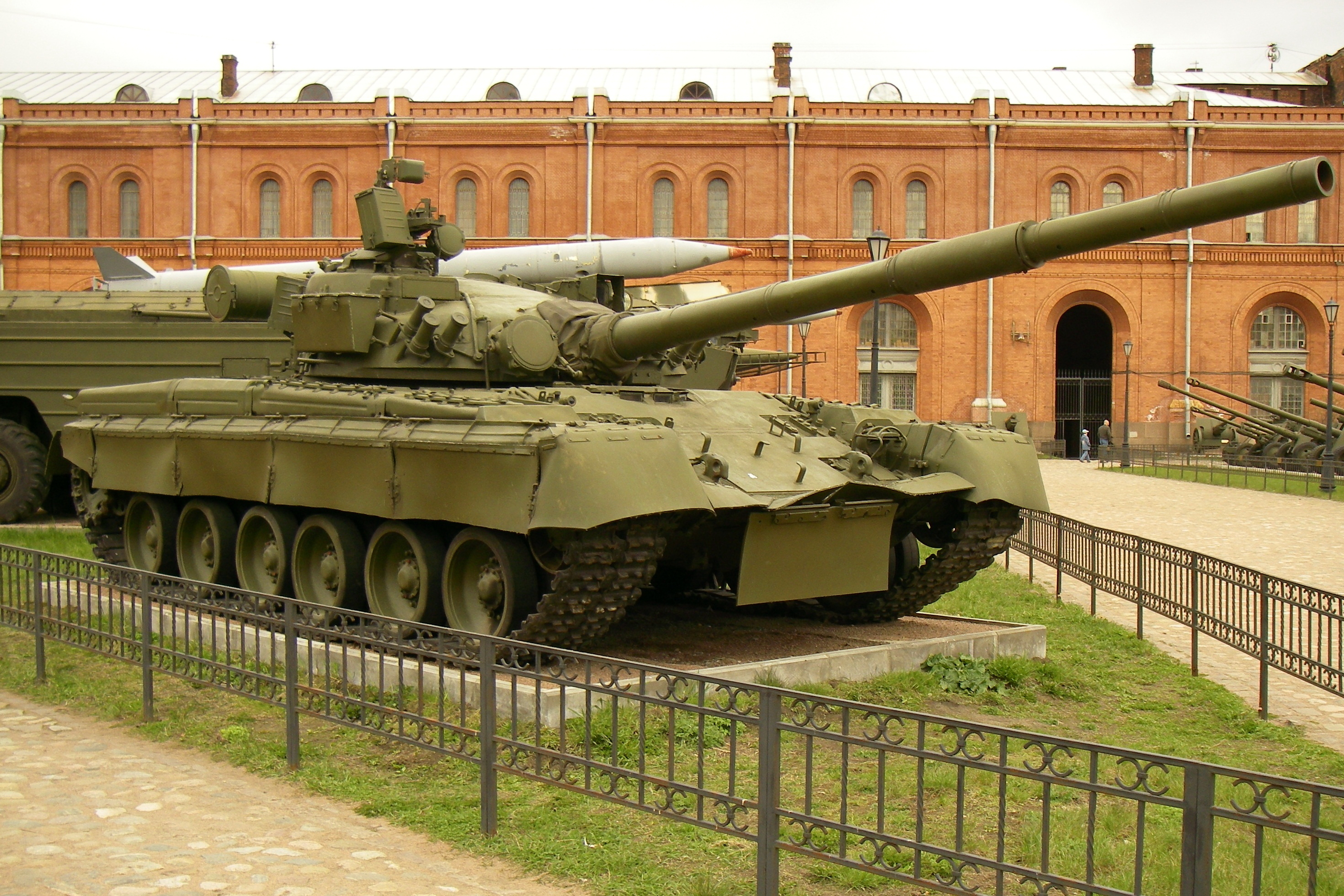
T-80B Main Battle Tank at the St Petersburg Artillery Museum.

The T-80 is a main battle tank (MBT) designed and manufactured in the former Soviet Union. A development of the T-64, it entered service in 1976 and was the first production tank to be equipped with a gas turbine engine for main propulsion (the Stridsvagn 103 only used a supplementary gas turbine by 1971). The T-80U was last produced in a factory in Omsk, Russia, while the T-80UD and further-developed T-84 continue to be produced in Ukraine. The T-80 and its variants are in service in Belarus, Cyprus, Kazakhstan, Pakistan, Russia, South Korea and Ukraine. The chief designer of the T-80 was the Russian engineer Nikolay Popov.

The main gun is fed by the Korzina automatic loader. This holds up to 28 rounds of two-part ammunition in a carousel located under the turret floor. Additional ammunition is stored within the turret. The ammunition comprises the projectile (APFSDS, HEAT or HE-Frag) plus the propellant charge or the two part missile. The autoloader is an effective, reliable, combat-tested system which has been in use since the mid-1960s. The propellant charge is held inside a semi-combustible cartridge case which is made of a highly flammable material - this is consumed in the breech during firing, except for a small metal baseplate, which is ejected during the next reload cycle. Thanks to the ability to fire ATGM rounds, the T-80's main gun has a range relatively longer than that of Western tanks; it is capable of engaging targets at a range of 5,000 metres (3.1 mi).

A disadvantage highlighted during combat in Chechnya was the vulnerability of the T-80BV to catastrophic explosion. The reason given by U.S. and Russian experts was the vulnerability of the stored semi-combustible propellant charges and missiles when contacted by the molten metal jet from the penetration of a HEAT warhead, causing the entire ammunition load to explode. This vulnerability may be addressed in later models. When Western tank designs changed from non-combustible propellant cartridges to semi-combustible, they tended to separate ammunition stowage from the crew compartment with armoured blast doors, and they provided 'blow-out' panels to redirect the force and fire of any exploding ammunition away from the crew compartment. The Russian vector for development for future however is apparently to remove the crew from the turret altogether, this has been implemented with T-14 Armata which was revealed in 2015 Victory Day parade.

=== T-90 Main Battle Tank ===
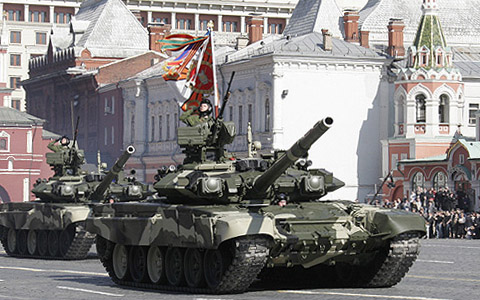
T-90A of the Russian Army.

The T-90 is a Russian main battle tank (MBT) derived from the T-72, and is currently the most modern tank in service with the Russian Ground Forces and Naval Infantry. The successor to the T-72BM, the T-90 uses the tank gun and 1G46 gunner sights from the T-80U, a new engine, and thermal sights. Protective measures include Kontakt-5 explosive reactive armour (ERA), laser warning receivers, Nakidka camouflage, the EMT-7 electromagnetic pulse (EMP) creator for the destruction of magnetic mines and the Shtora infrared ATGM jamming system. It is designed and built by Uralvagonzavod, in Nizhny Tagil, Russia.

The T-90 with an 840 hp (630 kW) engine went into low-level production in 1993, based on a prototype designated T-88. It features a new generation of Kontakt-5 explosive reactive armor on its hull and turret. Of conventional layout, the T-90 represents a major upgrade to every system in the T-72, including the main gun. The T-90MS have been identified as export model. The references to a T-90E appear to be unsubstantiated. The T-90 is fitted with a "three-tiered" protection system: the first tier is the composite armour in the turret, second tier is third generation Kontakt-5 ERA and third tier is a Shtora-1 countermeasures suite.

=== T-14 Armata ===
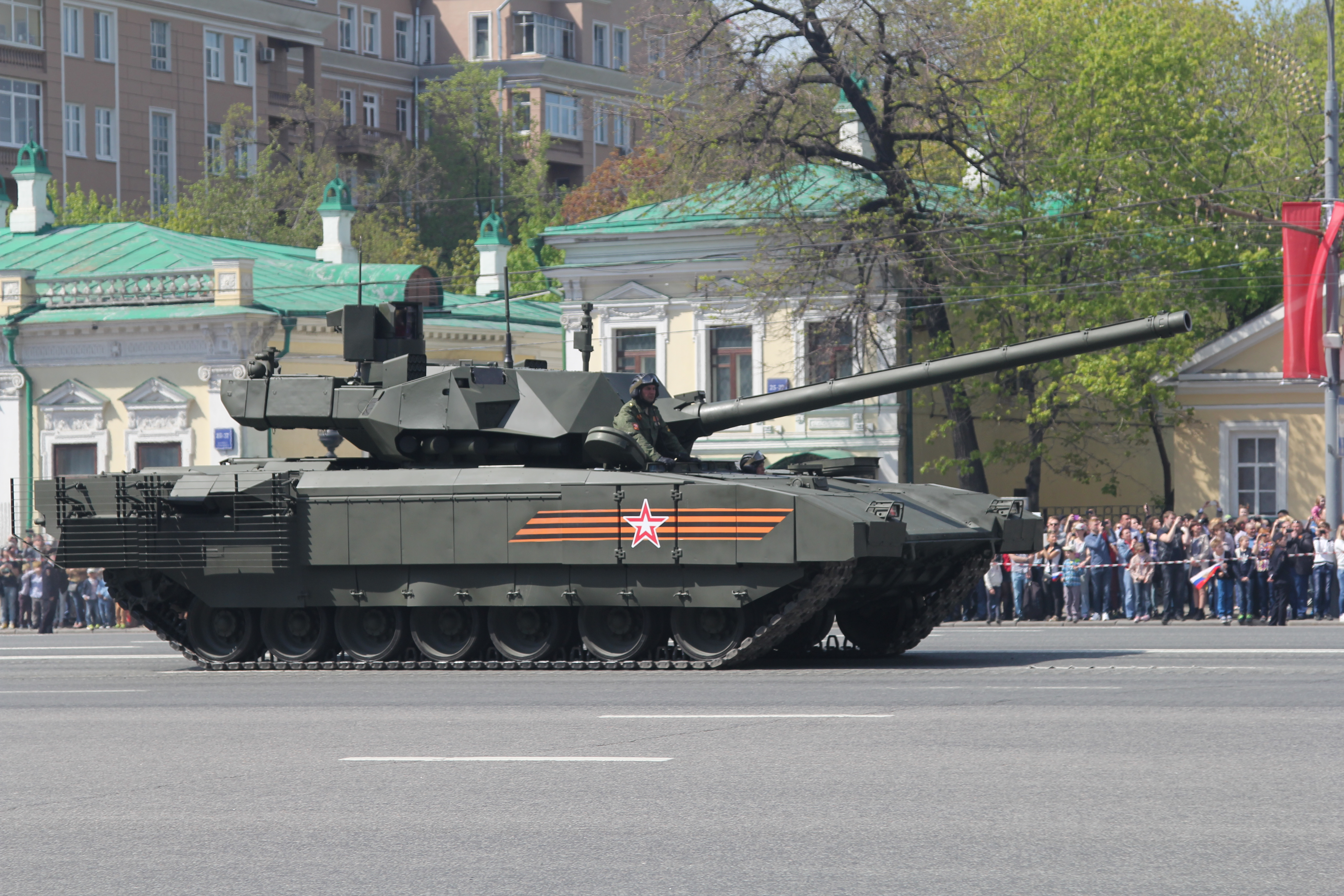
T-14 Armata at the 2015 Moscow Victory Day Parade

The T-14 Armata is a Russian 4th generation main battle tank based on the Armata Universal Combat Platform. It was first seen in public during rehearsals for the 2015 Moscow Victory Day Parade. From 2015 to 2020 the Russian army planned to acquire 2,300 T-14s, although unit costs were a concern. Some estimates place production at about 20 tanks as of 2023, with the vehicle falling to pass state requirements and not yet adopted for active duty by the Russian army.

== List of tanks of the Soviet/Russian army ==
=== World War I tanks ===
- Tsar Tank

=== World War II tanks ===
- T-18
- T-26
- T-28
- T-34
- T-35
- T-44
- T-50 tank
- T-60
- T-70
- Kliment Voroshilov tank
- Iosif Stalin tank

=== World War II tank destroyers ===
- SU-76
- SU-85
- SU-100
- SU-122
- SU-152
- ISU-122
- ISU-152
- Object 704 (Upgraded version to the ISU-152)

=== Cold War tanks ===
- T-10
- T-54/55
- T-62
- T-64
- PT-76
- T-72
- T-80

=== Post-Cold War tanks ===
- T-14 Armata
- T-90
- T-95 (cancelled)

=== Experimental/Prototype Tanks ===
- BT-SV (BT-SW-2)
- Object 140
- Object 279
- Object 416
- Object 430
- Obiekt 770
- Obiekt 775
- Obiekt 785
- Object 907

== See also ==
- Tank classification
- History of the tank
- Tanks in World War I
- Comparison of World War I tanks
- List of interwar armoured fighting vehicles
- Tanks in World War II

== Bibliography ==
- Asher, Jerry; Eric Hammel (December 1987). Duel for the Golan: The 100-Hour Battle That Saved Israel. Pacifica Press (CA). p. 288. ISBN 978-0-935553-52-9.
- Cockburn, Andrew (1983). The Threat: Inside the Soviet Military Machine. New York: Random House. 3 May 1983 ISBN 0-394-52402-0.
- Dunstan, Simon (1982). Vietnam tracks-Armor In Battle 1945-75. Osprey Publications. ISBN 0-89141-171-2.
- Foss, Christopher F., ed (2005). Jane's Armour and Artillery 2005–2006, 26th edition. 15 August 2005 ISBN 0-7106-2686-X.
- Gawrych, George (2000). The Albatross of Decisive Victory: War and Policy Between Egypt and Israel in the 1967 and 1973 Arab-Israeli Wars. Greenwood Publishing Group. ISBN 978-0-313-31302-8.
- Gawrych, Dr. George W. (1996). The 1973 Arab-Israeli War: The Albatross of Decisive Victory. Combat Studies Institute, U.S. Army Command and General Staff College. Intro, Part I, Part II, Part III, Part IV, Part V, Part VI, Part VII, Notes
- Gelbart, Marsh (1996). Tanks: Main Battle and Light Tanks. London: Brassey's. ISBN 978-1-85753-168-8.
- Haber, Eitan; Schiff, Ze'ev (2003). Yom Kippur War Lexicon (in Hebrew). Or-Yehuda, Israel: Zmora-Bitan-Dvir. ISBN 978-965-517-124-2.
- Hammad, Gamal (2002). al-Maʻārik al-ḥarbīyah ʻalá al-jabhah al-Miṣrīyah: (Ḥarb Uktūbar 1973, al-ʻĀshir min Ramaḍān) [Military Battles on the Egyptian Front] (in Arabic) (First ed.). Dār al-Shurūq. p. 903. ISBN 978-977-09-0866-2.
- Herzog, Chaim (2003) [1975]. The War of Atonement: The Inside Story of the Yom Kippur War. London: Greenhill Books. ISBN 978-1-85367-569-0.
- Herzog, Chaim (1982). the Arab-Israeli Wars. Random House. ISBN 978-0-394-50379-0.
- Hunnicutt, R. P. "Patton: A History of the American Main Battle Tank." ISBN 0-89141-230-1.
- Hunnicutt, R. P. Sheridan: A History of the American Light Tank. Volume 2; 1995, Presidio Press. ISBN 0-89141-462-2.
- Rabinovich, Abraham (2005) [2004]. The Yom Kippur War: The Epic Encounter That Transformed the Middle East. New York: Schocken Books. ISBN 978-0-8052-4176-1.
- Shazly, Lieutenant General Saad el (2003). The Crossing of the Suez, Revised Edition (Revised ed.). American Mideast Research. p. 368. ISBN 978-0-9604562-2-2.
- Starry, Gen. Donn A. (1989). Mounted Combat in Vietnam. Washington, D.C.: Vietnam Studies, Department of the Army. First printed in 1978-CMH Pub 90-17.
- Tucker, Spencer (2004). Tanks: An Illustrated History of Their Impact. ABC-CLIO. ISBN 1-57607-995-3
- Warford, James M. (1995). "Cold War Armor After Chechnya: An Assessment of the Russian T-80" (PDF). Armor. Fort Knox. Kentucky: US Army Armor Center. ISSN 0004-2420.
- Westermeyer, Paul W. U.S. Marines in Battle: Al-Khafji, 28 January–1 February 1991 (PDF). Washington, D.C., United States of America: History Division, U.S. Marine Corps.
- Williams, Scott (June 2002). "The Battle of Al-Khafji". Naval Postgraduate School.
- Zaloga, Steven J.; Hugh Johnson (2004). T-54 and T-55 Main Battle Tanks 1944–2004. Botley, Oxford: Osprey. ISBN 978-1-84176-792-5.
- Zaloga, Steven J., Jim Kinnear, Andrey Aksenov & Aleksandr Koshchavtsev (1997). Soviet Tanks in Combat 1941-45: The T-28, T-34, T-34-85, and T-44 Medium Tanks, Hong Kong: Concord Publication. ISBN 962-361-615-5.
- Zaloga, Steven; Samuel Katz (1 September 1996). Tank Battles of the Mid-East Wars 1: The Wars of 1948–1973. Concord. ISBN 978-962-361-612-6.
- Zaloga, Steven J. (1993). T-72 Main Battle Tank 1974-93. Oxford, United Kingdom: Osprey. p. 48. ISBN 978-1-85532-338-4.
- Zaloga, Steven J.; Grandsen, James (1984). Soviet Tanks and Combat Vehicles of World War Two. London: Arms and Armour Press. ISBN 978-0-85368-606-4.
