= Smoke discharger =

Smoke discharger may refer to:

- Smoke grenade discharger, or commonly a cluster of smoke grenade launchers
- A smoke machine used by the T-62 tank
