= Uralvagonzavod =

Russian machine-building and military manufacturer

Coordinates: 57°56′10″N 60°05′50″E

UralVagonZavod

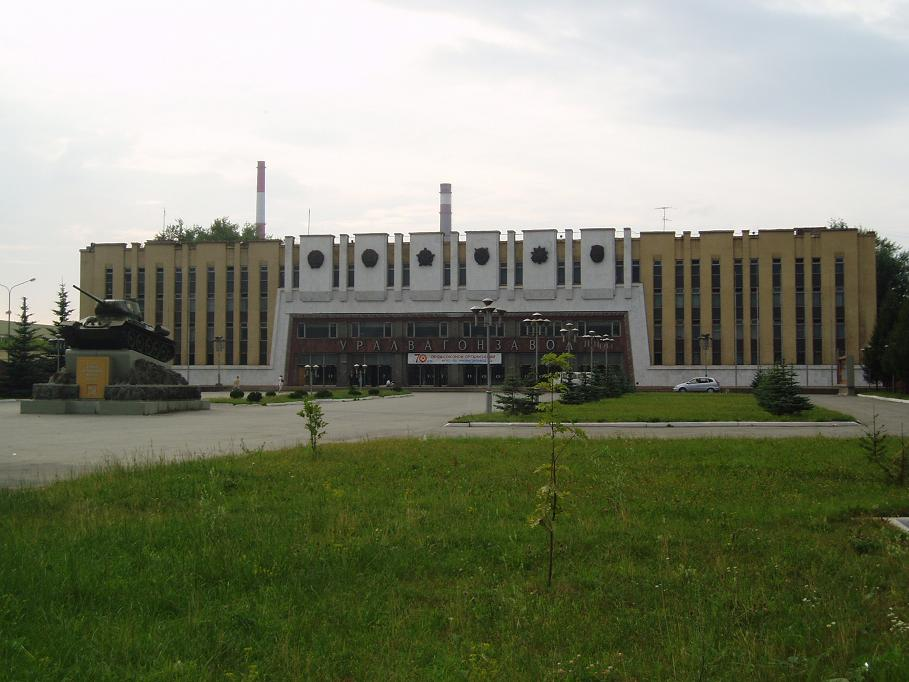
- Main entrance to Uralvagonzavod, 2005
- Native name: УралВагонЗавод (in Russian)
- Type: Public limited company
- Industry: Defense industry Machine industry
- Founded: October 11, 1936; 89 years ago
- Headquarters: Nizhny Tagil, Sverdlovsk Oblast, Russia
- Area served: Worldwide
- Key people: Vladimir Artyakov (Chairman); Alexander Potapov (CEO)
- Products: Artillery, howitzers, self-propelled artillery, naval artillery, mortars, tanks, main battle tanks, military vehicles, remote weapon stations, turrets, autocannons, tractors, bulldozers, heavy equipment, railway vehicles, containers
- Revenue: $1.97 billion (2016; 2018)
- Operating income: $81.1 million (2016)
- Net income: −$79.1 million (December 2016)
- Owner: Rostec (97.5%)
- Number of employees: 30,000 est.
- Parent: Rostec
- Website: uralvagonzavod.ru

UralVagonZavod (Russian: ОАО «Научно-производственная корпорация «УралВагонЗавод», romanized: OAO "Nauchno-proizvodstvennaya korporatsiya "UralVagonZavod", lit. 'Open Joint Stock Company "Research and Production Corporation Ural Wagon Factory"') is a Russian machine-building company located in Nizhny Tagil, Russia. It is one of the largest scientific and industrial complexes in Russia and the largest main battle tank manufacturer in the world.

== Etymology ==
The name Уралвагонзавод means Ural Railroad Car (wagon) Factory.

== History ==
T-34 production at Uralvagonzavod, February 1942

The plant was built during 1931–1936, mostly during the second Soviet five-year plan. It opened on October 11, 1936, and was named after Felix Dzerzhinsky. Initially, it manufactured freight cars. Its design and construction were influenced by American industrial practices of the era. As part of Stalin's rapid industrialization program, the Soviet government contracted several U.S. firms—most notably Albert Kahn Associates of Detroit—to assist in designing large-scale industrial plants modeled on American automotive factories, particularly the Ford River Rouge complex. Uralvagonzavod was among the most ambitious of these projects, intended to produce railway cars and tractors.

While not part of any U.S. government initiative, the collaboration relied on American industrial expertise, which the USSR paid for in hard currency and gold, during a period of severe domestic economic strain. Some of this capital was raised through grain exports taken from Ukraine and other regions during collectivization, contributing to the 1932–33 famine. Though intended for civilian production, factories like Uralvagonzavod were later converted to military purposes, such as T-34 tank production during World War II—validating early U.S. concerns that such industrial infrastructure could be repurposed for warfare.

After the German invasion of 1941, Joseph Stalin ordered hundreds of factories in Ukraine and western Russia to be evacuated east. The KhPZ Factory No. 183 in Kharkiv was moved to Nizhny Tagil by rail, and merged with the Dzerzhinsky Works, to form the Stalin Ural Tank Factory No. 183. During the Second World War it became the largest producer of tanks in the world, including the T-34. For its services, Uralvagonzavod received several honorary awards between 1941–1945, including the Order of the Red Banner of Labour (1942), Order of the Red Banner (1943), Order of Lenin (1944), Order of the Patriotic War (1945).

After the war, tank production was scaled down. Part of the Vagonka's manufacturing and design assets were transferred back to Kharkiv's Diesel Factory No. 75 during 1945–1951. Uralvagonzavod was expanded to produce other kinds of machinery: agricultural, construction, aviation, and space, including design and production of the Vostok, Voskhod, Proton and Energia expendable rockets.

Aleksandr Morozov left UVZ to lead the tank design bureau in Kharkiv in 1951, taking many of his engineers with him. Morozov was replaced by A. V. Kolesnikov in the interim. Leonid N. Kartsev was promoted to Section 520 chief designer in 1953, days before the death of Joseph Stalin. After his promotion, Kartsev was approached by the NKVD and told to hand over his jewish workers. Kartsev refused. The conflict was resolved following a coup led by Nikita Khrushchev that removed Lavrentiy Beria from power.

At the Kartsev-Venediktov Design Bureau (OKB-520), the T-54A and T-55 (a development of Morozov's T-54), T-62, T-72, and T-90 tanks were designed. The design bureau was working on a next-generation main battle tank, rumored to be called the T-95, until this project was cancelled in May 2010. It manufactures Russia's newest main battle tank, the T-14 Armata.

In July 2014, the Obama administration imposed sanctions, through the US Department of Treasury's Office of Foreign Assets Control (OFAC) by adding Uralvagonzavod and other entities to the Specially Designated Nationals List (SDN) in retaliation for the ongoing annexation of the Crimean Peninsula by the Russian Federation and the Russian interference in Ukraine. The United Kingdom also imposed sanctions from 12 September 2014.

As of December 2016, UVZ has been transferred to Rostec, following a presidential decree.

In 2020, the company's revenue amounted to 28 billion rubles.

In 2022, Uralvagonzavod was placed under additional sanctions as a result of the Russian invasion of Ukraine.

In March 2022, the EU imposed sanctions on Uralvagonzavod after the 2022 Russian invasion of Ukraine.

== Operations ==
The company's main products include railway cars, tanks, road-building vehicles, agricultural vehicles such as the RT-M-160, metallurgical products, tools and consumer goods.

Production of T-90 main battle tanks accounts for 18–20% of the company's overall production. In 2008, Uralvagonzavod produced about 175 tanks, including 62 T-90As for the Russian Ministry of Defense and 60 T-90Ss for India. This represents the highest level of tank production at UralVagonZavod and in Russia as a whole since 1993. According to Moscow Defense Brief, in 2008 the number of tanks produced by the company, was greater than the number of main battle tanks produced by all the other countries of the world put together.

Railway cars and other civilian production amounted to two-thirds of the company's overall output in 2008.

In 2011, the company's revenue was $3 billion. The net profit was $0.33 billion.

In July 2023, Russian Defense Minister Sergey Shoigu stated that the supplies and overhaul of T-72 and T-90 tanks by Uralvagonzavod had surged 3.6 times since early 2022. It was reported by the company in late December 2023 that it had successfully performed the year's state defense order for T-90M and modernized T-72B3M tanks.

== Awards ==
- Order of Lenin (March 26, 1935 and December 31, 1970)
- Order of the October Revolution (September 15, 1976)
- Order of the Red Banner (February 10, 1943)
- Order of the Red Banner of Labour (June 16, 1942)
- Order of the Patriotic War I degree (June 10, 1946)
- Order of Holy Prince Daniel of Moscow III degree (2006)
- Order of Saint Righteous Grand Duke Dmitry Donskoy II degree (2005)
- Diploma of the Supreme Commander-in-Chief of the Armed Forces of the Russian Federation (October 10, 2016) — for services to strengthening the defense capability of the state, the development and creation of modern weapons and military equipment.
- Badge of Honour "For Success in Labour" (September 13, 2021) — for his great contribution to the creation of new special equipment, strengthening the country's defense capability and high performance in production activities.

In 2011 UVZ won in two nominations of the annual interregional award «Results of the year of the Urals and Siberia-2011».

== Bibliography ==
- Benua, Sofia (2015). Достижения в СССР. Хроники великой цивилизации [Achievements in the USSR. The Chronicles of a Great Civilization] (in Russian). Moscow: Algoritm. p. 368. ISBN 978-5-4438-1006-5.
- Kinnear, James; Sewell, Stephen L. (2001). Soviet T-62 Main Battle Tank. Osprey Publishing. ISBN 978-1472848222.
- Lyutskov, E. (2015). Ветеран труда. Наградная фалеристика предприятий и организаций СССР [Veteran of Labor. Faleristics of enterprises and organizations in the USSR] (in Russian). Moscow. p. 497.
- Shunkov, Victor (2017). Полная энциклопедия современного вооружения России [The Complete Encyclopedia of Russian Modern Weapons] (in Russian). Moscow: AST. p. 240. ISBN 978-5-17-094307-4.
- Zamyatin, Dmitrii (2020). Геокультурный брендинг городов и территорий: от теории к практике [Geocultural Branding of Cities and Territories: From Theory to Practice] (in Russian). Moscow: Aleteya. p. 668. ISBN 978-5-00165-011-9.
