= RT-M-160 =

РТ-М-160
- Type: agricultural
- Manufacturer: Uralvagonzavod
- Production: 2004 -
- Propulsion: wheels

The RT-M-160 («РТ-М-160») - is an agricultural tractor model manufactured by Uralvagonzavod (ОАО «Научно-производственная корпорация «УралВагонЗавод»). The tractor can handle most agricultural machinery, tractors designed for 1, 2 and 3 classes. The tractor RT-M-160 meets the up-to-date agricultural requirements. The tractor is available in two versions: RT-M-160U («РТ-М-160У») - with no controls the rear wheels. RT-M-160 («РТ-М-160») - with the ability to control the rear wheels.

The tractor is designed for the following:

- For cropping and harvesting vegetables and tall-stalked tilled crops with.
- For general cultivating, sowing and harvesting grain and other crops.
- For other general farming operations.
- For peat extraction.
- For cargo hauling.

Tractors RT-M-160 produced since 2004 and is in demand in Russia and exported to Bulgaria. The tractor is made of Russian technologies and components, was recognized at the International Exhibition of Inventions, New Technology and Products in Geneva, Switzerland. and received a silver medal. The VI International exhibition "Defense and Protection 2012", Uralvagonzavod introduced another new product - the tractor RT-M-160F with implements for fighting forest fire equipment.

== Modifications ==
- A tractor with a front loader RT-M-160U
- Tractor on a combined move, for shunting rail wagons with TMB-1
- The tractor is equipped with welding equipment RT-M-160S1
- The tractor with implements for fighting forest fire equipment RT-M-160F
