= T-62 =

1961 Soviet medium tank

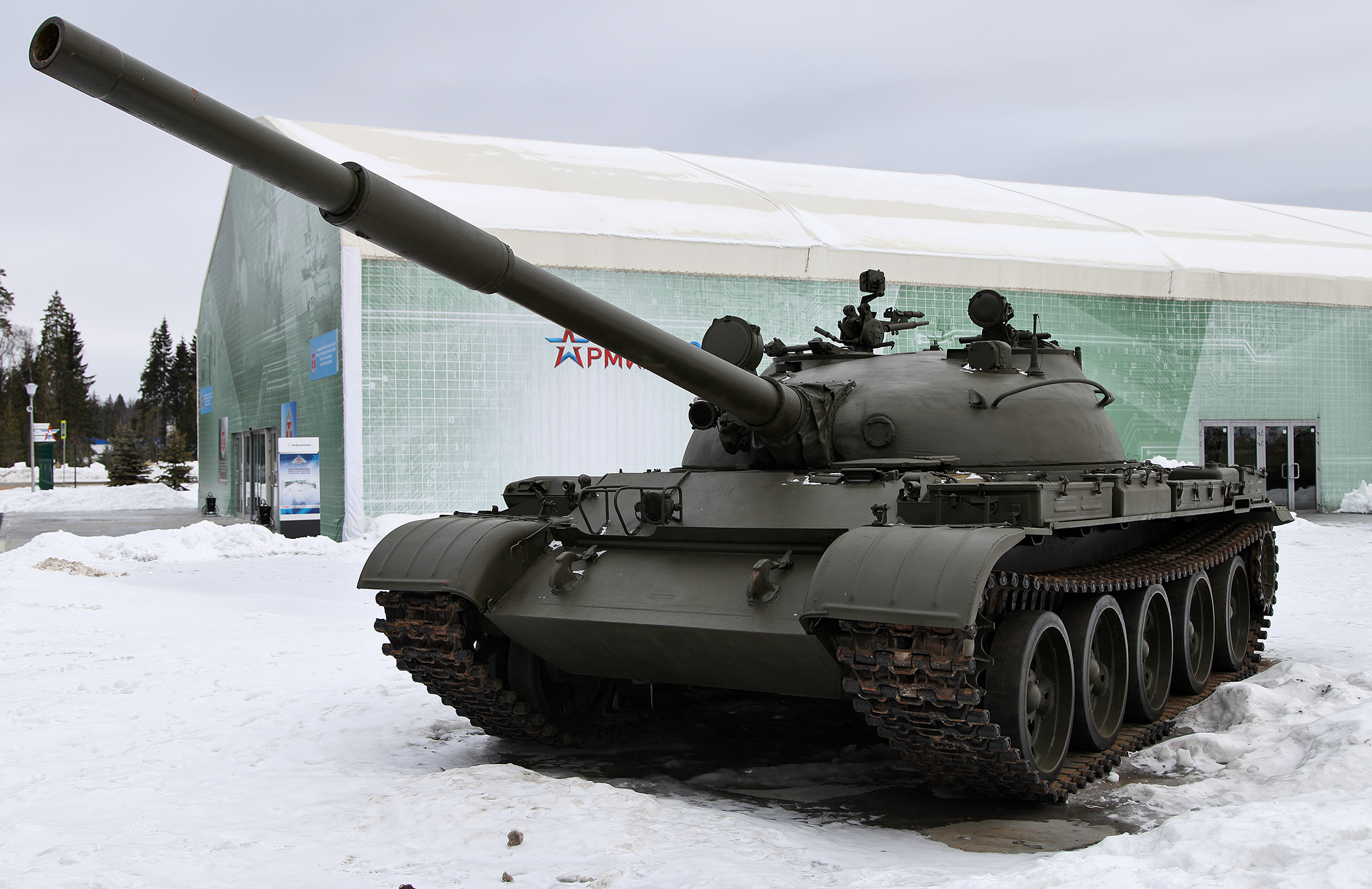
- A T-62 Main Battle Tank
- Type: Medium tank (Warsaw Pact designation); Main battle tank (NATO designation)
- Place of origin: Soviet Union

Service history
- In service: 1961–present
- Used by: See operators
- Wars: See combat history

Production history
- Designer: OKB-520 design bureau
- Manufacturer: Uralvagonzavod
- Unit cost: US$300,000 (export price to Egypt, 1972)
- Produced: 1961–1975 (USSR); ~1980s (North Korea)
- No. built: More than 22,700

Specifications (T-62)
- Mass: 37 t (41 short tons; 36 long tons)
- Length: 9.34 m (30 ft 8 in) with barrel in forward position 6.63 m (21 ft 9 in) hull only
- Width: 3.30 m (10 ft 10 in)
- Height: 2.40 m (7 ft 10 in)
- Crew: 4 (commander, driver, gunner, loader)
- Armour: Cast turret 214 (242 after 1972) mm turret front 153 mm turret sides 97 mm turret rear 40 mm turret roof Hull; 102 mm at 60° hull front 79 mm hull upper sides 15 mm hull lower sides 46 mm at 0° hull rear 20 mm hull bottom 31 mm hull roof
- Main armament: 115 mm U-5TS (2A20) smoothbore gun
- Secondary armament: 7.62 mm PKT coaxial general-purpose machine gun (2500 rounds); 12.7 mm DShK 1938/46 antiaircraft heavy machine gun (optional until T-62 Obr.1972)
- Engine: V-55V (based on the Kharkiv model V-2); 580 (later 620) hp.
- Power/weight: 14.5 hp/tonne (10.8 kW/tonne)
- Suspension: torsion bar
- Ground clearance: 425 mm (16.7 in)
- Fuel capacity: 960 L 1360 L with two 200-liter extra fuel tanks
- Operational range: 450 km (280 mi) on road (650 km (400 mi) with two 200 L (53 US gal; 44 imp gal) extra fuel tanks); 320 km (200 mi) cross-country (450 km (280 mi) with two 200-liter extra fuel tanks)
- Maximum speed: 50 km/h (31 mph) (road); 40 km/h (25 mph) (cross country)

The T-62 is a Soviet main battle tank that was first introduced in 1961. As a further development of the T-55 series, the T-62 retained many design elements similar to its predecessor, including low profile, thick turret armor, engine and running gear. The T-62 featured the world's first production tank with a smoothbore tank gun firing an armor-piercing, fin stabilized, discarding sabot (APFSDS) round deemed capable of penetrating the thick armor of NATO tanks, like the US Army's M48A2 and M60A1 and the British Chieftain. The T-62 was adopted for service with the Red Army in mid-1961 and remained in production at Nizhni-Tagil until October 1973. Severe technical issues with the T-64 tank compelled the Red Army to keep the simpler and robust T-62 in front line service until superseded by the T-72 in 1973. The T-62 was was widely exported to client states in the Middle East and Africa into the early 1980s. As of 2002, over 7000 T-62s were in service, with a variety of upgrades from owner nation, third party vendors, and the Russian KBP Instrument Design Bureau.

== Development history ==
=== The initial requirements ===
By the late 1950s, Soviet commanders realised that the T-55's 100 mm gun could not penetrate the frontal armour of newer Western tanks, such as the Centurion and M48 Patton, with standard armour-piercing shells. While 100 mm high-explosive anti-tank (HEAT) ammunition could have done the job, they were much less accurate than APDS shells, and the relatively low flight velocity resulted in poorer accuracy if used on moving targets. It was decided to up-gun the T-55 with a 115 mm smoothbore gun, able to fire kinetic energy penetrator armour-piercing fin-stabilized discarding sabot (APFSDS) rounds.

Trials showed that the T-55 was inherently unsuited to mount the larger weapon and work began on a new tank. The bigger gun required a bigger turret and turret ring to absorb the higher recoil. This in turn necessitated a larger hull, as the T-55 hull was simply too small to accept the new turret. The T-62 thus took shape, marking an evolutionary improvement on the T-55.

=== Obiekt 140 ===
After the delivery of the T-54 design, its lead designer Alexander Morozov turned his attention to a new design, the Obiekt 430. Obiekt 430 had a hull of welded rolled steel plates and a turret of cast and forged steel. The turret had three-layer armour with an overall thickness of 185 mm to 240 mm. It was armed with the new 100 mm D-54TS tank gun.

During this period, simpler upgrades to the existing T-54 design were assigned to a young engineer, Leonid N. Kartsev, the head of the OKB-520 design bureau of Uralvagonzavod factory (UVZ) in Nizhny Tagil. He had already led the development of the relatively minor upgrades to the T-54 that produced the T-54A (Obiekt 137G) and T-54B (Obiekt 137G2).

Kartsev and his design team started working on a new tank, called Obiekt 140 (this was also informally called the T-54M). The new tank had a torsion bar suspension with six road wheels made of aluminium. The turret was cast and armed with the same D-54TS tank gun and included the Molniya two-plane stabilization system. The tank carried 50 rounds and was powered by a V-36 diesel engine developed by engineer Artiemejev. The engine was placed on the bottom of the hull, a solution that reduced the height of the engine compartment. The Obiekt 140 weighed 37.6 tonnes.

In 1957, Uralvagonzavod built two Obiekt 140 prototypes which were put on trials soon after. The Obiekt 140 would be more expensive in serial production. Forced to abandon the Obiekt 140, Kartsev started working on yet another T-54 modernisation called the Obiekt 155. This design was more similar to the original T-54, but incorporated one useful feature from the Obiekt 140; the upper fuel tanks were fitted with mounts for tank gun ammunition. This increased the ammunition load carried by the tank to 45 rounds.

=== T-62A (Object 165) ===
At the end of 1958, Kartsev decided to modernise the Ob'yekt 140 turret. He fitted it with a cartridge-case ejector and mounted it onto a stretched T-55 chassis. He also considered that designs based on already produced vehicles had a higher chance of acceptance. The Ob'yekt 140 turret diameter, bigger than the T-55 turret by 249 mm, made redesigning the central part of the hull necessary.

Kartsev changed the arrangement of the torsion beams, which was necessary to keep the tank's weight balanced. The tank received the designation "Ob'yekt 165" and in November 1958 three prototypes were built. In January 1962, the Ob'yekt 165 was accepted for service under the name T-62A. In the same year, Factory #183 produced five tanks that were put into experimental service.

=== Object 166 ===
While working on a new tank, Kartsev was looking for a more powerful tank gun. The 100 mm D-10T and D-54 tank guns had a fierce opponent in the form of the British L7A1 tank gun. The Soviets decided to "recaliber" the already existing 100 mm D-54TS tank gun. The modifications made to the gun included removing the rifling of the gun, reducing the profile of the bullet chamber, removing the muzzle brake, lengthening the gun tube, adding an automatic cartridge-case ejector, and adding a bore evacuator in the middle of the gun tube (as opposed to the D-54TS tank gun, which had a bore evacuator at the muzzle).

The new 115 mm tank gun was designated U-5TS "Molot" Rapira. It was the first smoothbore tank gun to go into serial production where it received the designation 2A20. It was put in trials against the D-10TS tank gun, which armed the T-54B as well as some T-55 and T-55A medium tanks. These trials showed that the under-calibre projectiles fired from the U-5TS had a nearly 200 m/sec higher muzzle velocity. It became apparent that the maximum range of the new tank gun was almost double that of the D-10TS. The only serious drawback of the U-5TS tank gun was the fact that it was not as accurate as the D-10TS, because of the lack of rifling. However, the greater range of the gun and its extremely high muzzle velocity made the poor accuracy less of an issue.

The new U-5TS smoothbore tank gun was fitted into the Ob'yekt 140 turret at the end of 1960. The new tank received the designation "Ob'yekt 166". In 1960, both Ob'yekt 165 and Ob'yekt 166 prototypes passed their trials. Uralvagonzavod was preparing to start serial production of the new tank, though the General Armoured Directorate (GBTU) was paying much more attention to Morozov's Ob'yekt 430, which was in development since early 1952.

Morozov was supported by General Dmitry Ustinov, who was in charge of the Soviet military industry at the time. He did not see it as necessary to produce the new tank from Uralvagonzavod, but soon the situation changed dramatically with the appearance of a new American main battle tank, the M60. In 1961, Soviet military intelligence discovered that Britain was working on a new main battle tank armed with a 120 mm tank gun. Because of this, Marshal Vasily Chuikov, Commander-in-Chief of the Soviet Army's Ground Forces, demanded an explanation of the "Kartsev's tanks" case.

At a conference of GBTU and the Soviet ground forces committee, it became apparent that Morozov's Ob'yekt 430 tank was only 10% better than the serial T-55. Because of this, Morozov's project was deemed a complete failure. Though the representatives of Kharkiv Morozov Machine Building Design Bureau disclosed their work on the improved Ob'yekt 432 (which would ultimately become the T-64), Chuikov demanded that production of the Ob'yekt 166 medium tank be started immediately.

The OKB-520 design bureau of Uralvagonzavod provided another design, the Ob'yekt 167, which was the Ob'yekt 166 with a new more powerful V-26 engine using a charger, developing 700 hp (522 kW). Two prototypes were built in the middle of 1961 and passed the trials. This time the GBTU decided not to wait for the new medium tank to pass trials, and sent the Ob'yekt 166 into mass production in July 1961. The Ob'yekt 165 also entered service in very small numbers, under the designation T-62A.

== Design ==
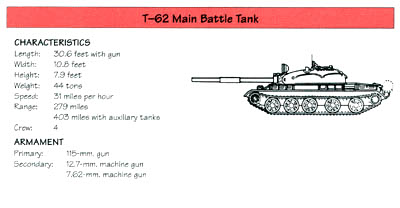
A US Army recognition poster

The T-62 has a typical tank layout: driver's compartment at the front, fighting compartment in the centre and engine compartment in the rear. The four-man crew consists of the commander, driver, gunner and loader. The driver's position is offset to the left of the forward compartment. The commander and driver's position in the turret are also offset to the left, while the loader sits on the right of the main gun. Although the T-62 is very similar to the T-55 and makes use of many of the same parts, there are some differences. These include the hull, which is a few centimetres longer and wider, the different road wheels, and differences in characteristic uneven gaps between road wheels. Unlike the T-54 and T-55 medium tanks, the gaps between the last three pairs of road wheels are larger than the rest.

=== Armament ===
The armament consists of the 115 mm U-5TS "Molot" (2A20) Rapira smoothbore tank gun with a two-axis "Meteor" stabiliser and bore evacuator. Secondary armament consists of one belt-fed 7.62 mm PKT coaxial general-purpose machine gun mounted on the right of the main gun. A 12.7 mm DShK 1938/46 antiaircraft heavy machine gun and a suitably modified loader's position was mounted on tanks after 1972, but the AA was not retrofitted to older T-62s. The tank carries 40 rounds of 115mm fixed ammunition for the main gun. 4 rounds are placed in the turret, and the rest are stored in the back of the fighting compartment and in the front of the hull, to the right of the driver. It carries 2,500 rounds for the coaxial machine gun.

The T-62 was armed with the world's first smoothbore tank gun, giving it considerably greater muzzle velocity than the Western 90 mm and 105 mm tank guns of its time. It can fire BM-3 APFSDS-T, BK-4, BK-4M HEAT and OF-18 Frag-HE rounds. The 115 mm gun introduced the first successful APFSDS ammunition, albeit with a steel penetrator. A smoothbore gun allowed a significantly better performance (from 10% to 20%) over HEAT ammunition, which was considered the main ammunition type for fighting enemy armour at medium and long ranges.

The gun can be elevated or depressed between −6° and +16°. It is reloaded manually and gets automatically reset to +3.5° of elevation after it is fired if the stabiliser is enabled. Empty cartridges are automatically ejected outside the vehicle through a small hatch in the rear of the turret. The gun has a range of effective fire of about 4 km during day conditions and 800 m at night (with the use of night vision equipment). This tank was fitted with a Meteor two-axis stabiliser, which allows the T-62 to aim and fire while moving. Tests of the Meteor conducted by the US army gave the T-62 a first hit probability of 70% for a moving target at 1000 meters with the tank moving up to 20 km/per hour. This gave the tank a good advantage in dynamic battlefields and breakthrough operations, especially in Central Europe where most of tank battles would take place under the 1500 meters range.

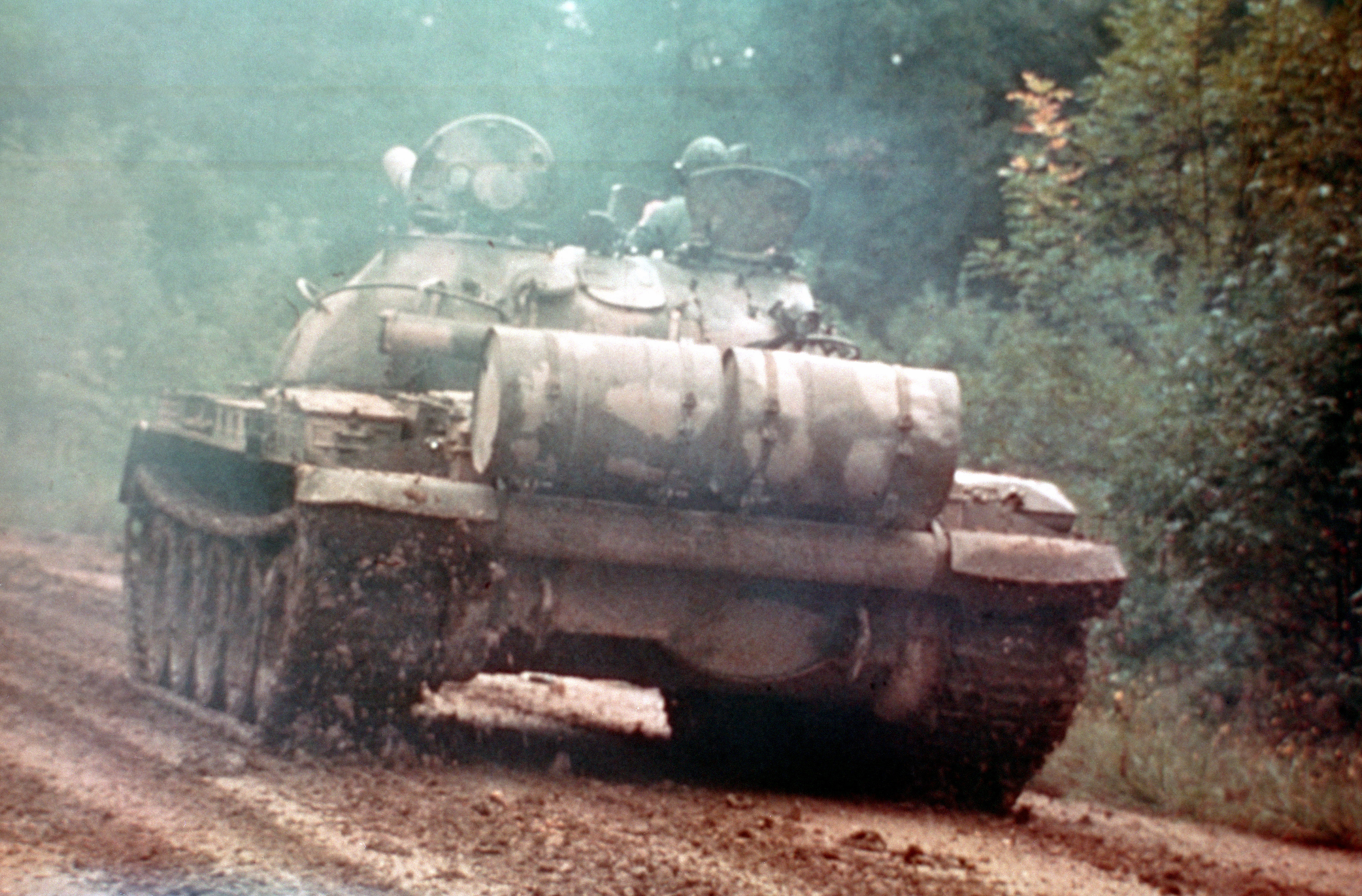
A rear view of a T-62 with two optional 200-litre drum-type fuel tanks

=== Mobility ===
The T-62 uses torsion bar suspension. It has five pairs of rubber-tired road wheels, a drive sprocket at the rear and an idler at the front on each side, with no return rollers. The first and last road wheels each have a hydraulic shock absorber. The tank is powered by the V-55 12-cylinder 4-stroke one-chamber 38.88-litre water-cooled diesel engine developing 581 hp (433 kW) at 2,000 rpm. This is the same engine as the one used in the T-55.

Because the T-62 weighs more than the T-55, it is less manoeuvrable. Like the T-55, the T-62 has three external diesel fuel tanks on the right fender and a single auxiliary oil tank on the left fender. The tank carries 960 litres of fuel in its internal and external fuel tanks. Two optional 200-litre drum-type fuel tanks can be fitted on the rear of the vehicle for an increased operational range.

=== Armor ===
The T-62 has 5% thicker armor on the front of the hull (102 mm at 60°) and 15% thicker armour on the front of the fully-cast turret (242 mm) than the T-54/T-55. The turret armour is 153 mm thick on the sides, 97 mm thick on the rear and 40 mm thick on the roof. The hull armour is 79 mm thick on the upper sides, 46 mm thick at 0° on the rear and 20 mm thick on the bottom. Although the armour on the front of the hull is thicker than in the T-55, the lower side armour (15 mm) and the roof armour (31 mm) are actually thinner.

=== Equipment ===
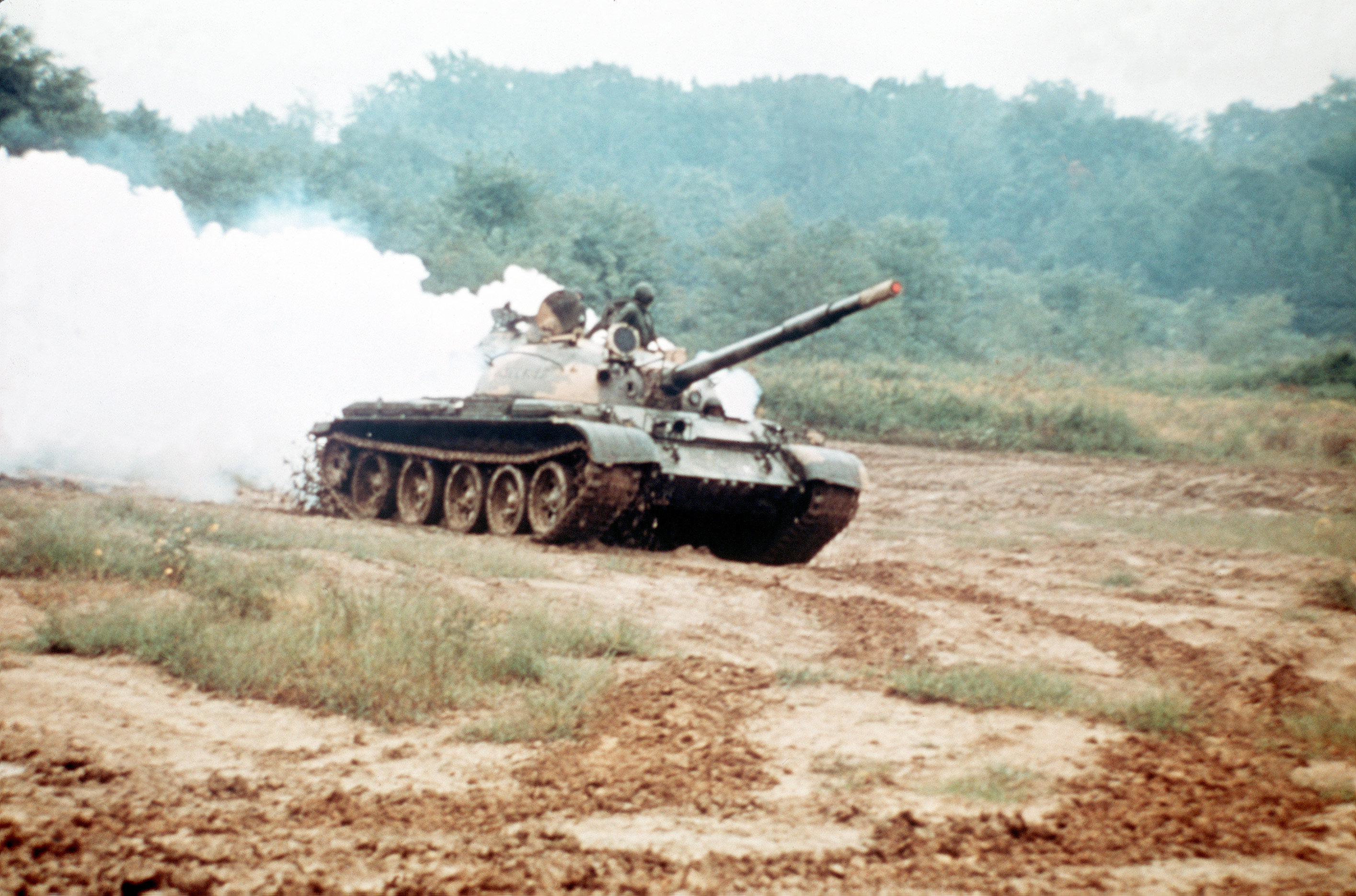
A T-62 laying a smoke screen

One of the many similarities between the T-54/T-55 and T-62 tanks is their ability to create a smoke screen by injecting diesel fuel into the exhaust system. Like the T-54 and T-55, the T-62 has an unditching beam mounted at the rear of the hull. The tank can be fitted with a thin snorkel for operational usage and a large diameter snorkel for training. The thin snorkel can be disassembled and carried in the back of the turret when not used.

The commander's cupola is located on the left of the top of the turret. The loader has a single-piece hatch located on the right side of the turret and further back than the commander's cupola. The loader's hatch has a periscope vision block that can be used to view the areas in front of and behind the vehicle. The commander's cupola has four periscopes, two are located in the hatch cover while the other two are located in the forward part of the cupola.

The driver has a single piece hatch located on the left front of the vehicle, directly in front of the left side of the turret. The tank uses the same sights and vision devices as the T-55 except for the gunner, who received a new TSh-2B-41 sight which has x4 or x7 magnification. It is mounted coaxially with an optic rangefinder.

The gunner has two periscope vision blocks, one of which is used in conjunction with the main searchlight mounted coaxially on the right side of the main armament. There are two other smaller searchlights. One of these is used by the commander and is mounted on his cupola. The tank has two headlights on the right front of the vehicle, one of which is infrared while the other one is white.

Curved handrails around the turret allow easier entry for the commander, the gunner, and the loader. They also help the infantry to mount and dismount the tank while performing a tank desant. The tank has a box-shaped radiation detector/actuator mounted on the right-hand side of the turret, behind the compressed air tanks.

While the T-62 did not feature an automatic loader (as would become characteristic of later Soviet tanks), it had a unique "ejection port" built into the back of the turret, which would open as the main gun recoiled, ejecting spent shell casings outside. This was considered advantageous since the spent casings would otherwise clutter the floor of the tank and fill the interior with noxious burnt-propellant fumes. There is a blower mounted in the rear of the turret, to the left of the spent cartridge ejection port.

=== Limitations ===
The T-62 shares some of the T-55's limitations: a cramped crew compartment, limited depression of the main gun and vulnerable fuel and ammunition storage areas. Opening the ejection port under NBC (nuclear, biological, or chemical) conditions would potentially expose the crew to contamination.

Early models of the T-62 only filtered nuclear fallout, leaving the crew exposed to chemical or biological contaminants, as the air was not passed through a chemical filter. Late production models of the T-62 were fitted with a chemical filter.

Each time the gun is fired, the tube must go into detent for cartridge ejection; though the system can be deactivated making this unnecessary or in case of facing an NBC environment. The T-62 maximum average rate of fire is limited to 8 rounds per minute, which falls behind the capabilities of Western 105 mm gun equipped tanks.

It takes 20 seconds for the T-62's turret to rotate through a full 360°, which is 5 seconds longer than the time needed by the US M60A1 Patton tank.

The turret also cannot be traversed with the driver's hatch open. Although the tank commander may override the gunner and traverse the turret, he cannot fire the main gun from his position.

The US Army considered the T-62's gun more accurate than that of the M60A1 within 1500 meters, but less accurate at greater ranges.

To fire the 12.7 mm antiaircraft heavy machine gun, the loader must be partially exposed, making him vulnerable to suppressive fire, and he must leave his main gun loading duties unattended.

Due to their vulnerability to fire, the auxiliary fuel drums were usually removed prior to combat, decreasing the operational range substantially.

The T-62K command tank land navigation system requires a 15 minute warm-up, during which the vehicle cannot move without damaging the gyroscopic compass.

The T-62 underperformed in export markets relative to the T-54/T-55 series. Namely due to the much more expensive export price of the T-62, being $300,000 to Egypt in 1972, whereas the T-55 cost only $200,000, alongside Egypt already having a logistics line for T-54/55 upkeep. This also caused Warsaw Pact nations to be swayed away from the purchase of the T-62 as they felt that the logistical and unit costs outweighed the benefits it could provide.

Third, the T-62 was, according to Perrett, almost immediately surpassed on its introduction by the new Western MBTs, the Chieftain and M60. Finally, the T-62 could not keep up with the new Soviet BMP-1 – the principal infantry fighting vehicle that the T-62 was supposed to accompany. All of these factors combined to ensure that long-term investment in the T-62 was not viable and a new Soviet MBT had to be developed.

== Production history ==
In July 1961, Uralvagonzavod in Nizhny Tagil, Malyshev Factory in Kharkiv, Ukraine and Omsk Factory No. 183 replaced part of their T-55 production with the T-62. The original plans were that the T-62 would be produced until Morozov's Ob'yekt 432 tank (which would become the T-64) was developed. T-62 production was maintained at Uralvagonzavod until 1973 when it was replaced on the production lines by the T-72. Until the end of production 20,000 T-62 tanks were produced by Uralvagonzavod. Production in the Soviet Union was stopped in 1975.

North Korea produced the T-62 under licence until the 1980s. In the early 1990s, the North Korean Second Machine Industry Bureau designed a lighter copy of the T-62 which is mass-produced and is known locally as the Ch'ŏnma-ho I (Ga).

== Service history ==
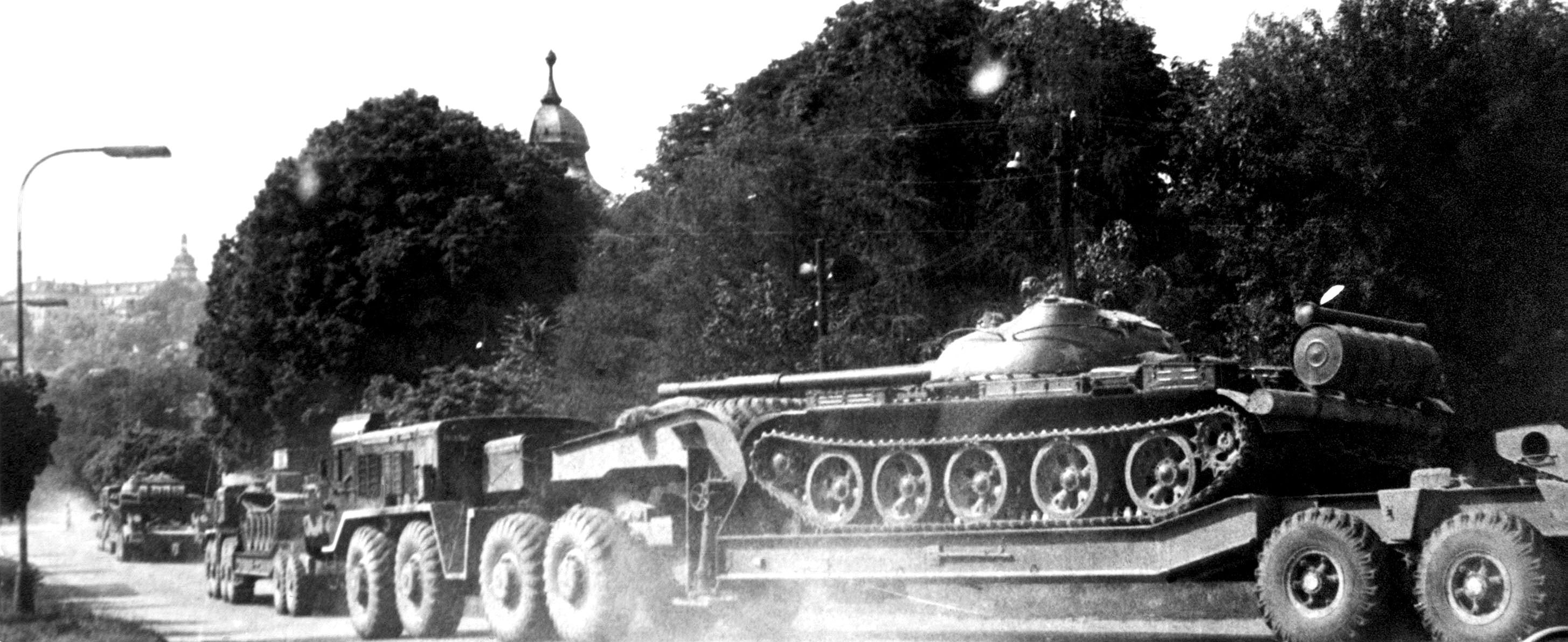
MAZ-537 tractor-trailers transporting T-62 tanks, 23 May 1984

=== Soviet Union ===
Soviet losses of T-62 tanks
Year	Number
1979	1
1980	18
1981	28
1982	17
1983	13
1984	7
1985	18
1986	14
1987	7
1988	22
1989	2

The T-62 entered service with the Soviet Army in July 1961. Because of the firepower of the new 115 mm gun, it was considered to be a formidable tank for the time, despite its drawbacks. Along with the T-55, the T-62 was one of the most common tanks in the Soviet inventory. The two tanks together once comprised approximately 85% of the Soviet army's tanks. As the Soviet Union introduced more modern tanks like the T-64, T-72 and T-80, the T-62 was rendered obsolete and was put into reserve service.

==== Sino-Soviet border conflict ====
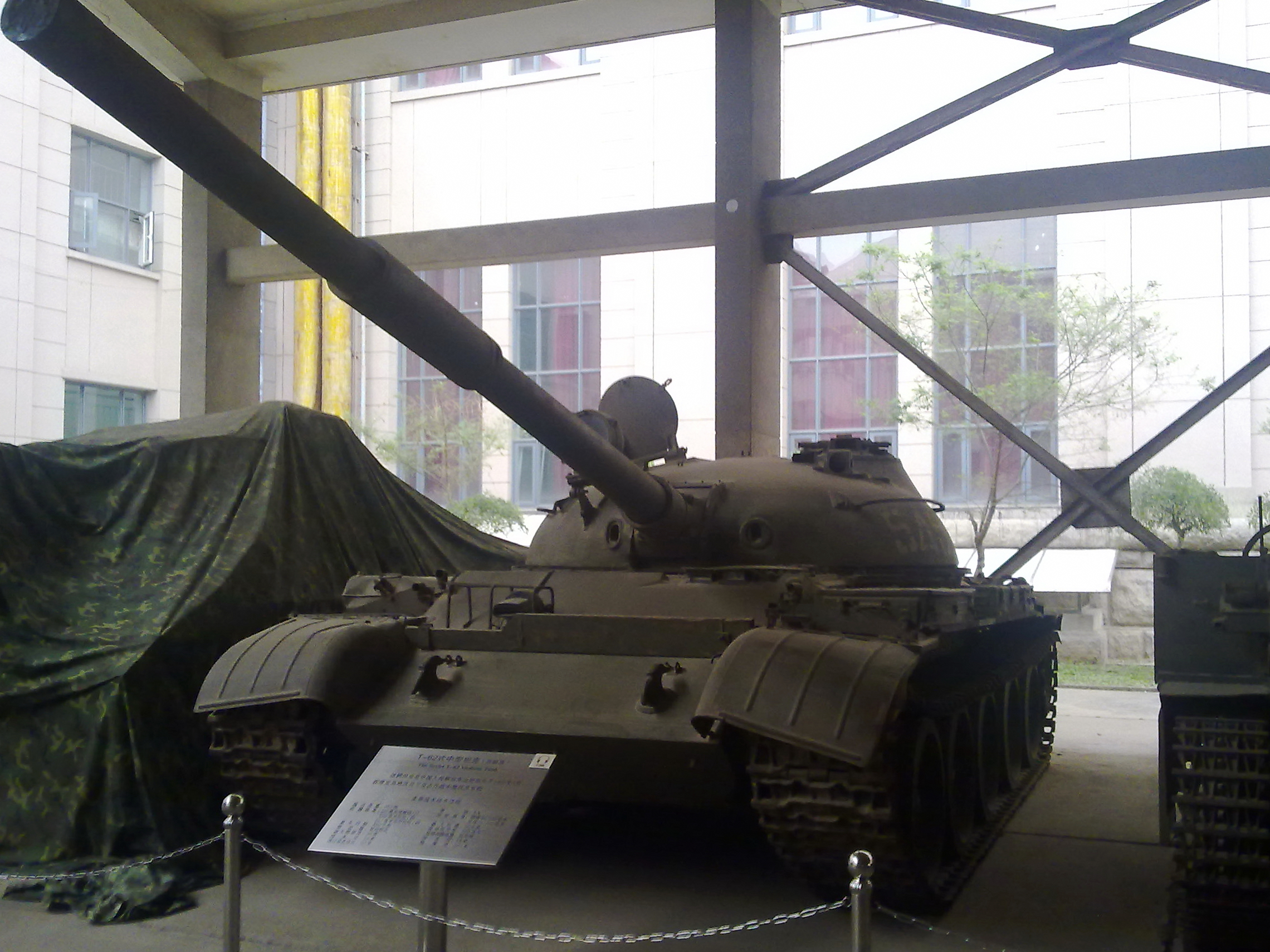
A T-62 tank captured by the PLA during the 1969 Sino-Soviet border conflict

The T-62 saw combat for the first time during the 1969 Sino–Soviet border conflict during which one was disabled and captured by the People's Liberation Army. The T-62 (No. 545) was hit by a rocket-propelled grenade fired from a Type-56 (Chinese copy of RPG-2) RPG launcher on the morning of 15 March 1969 during a PLA counterattack. The RPG penetrated the left side of the hull, killing the driver. This tank was later studied and the information gathered from those studies was used for the development of the Type 69 main battle tank.

==== Soviet–Afghan War ====
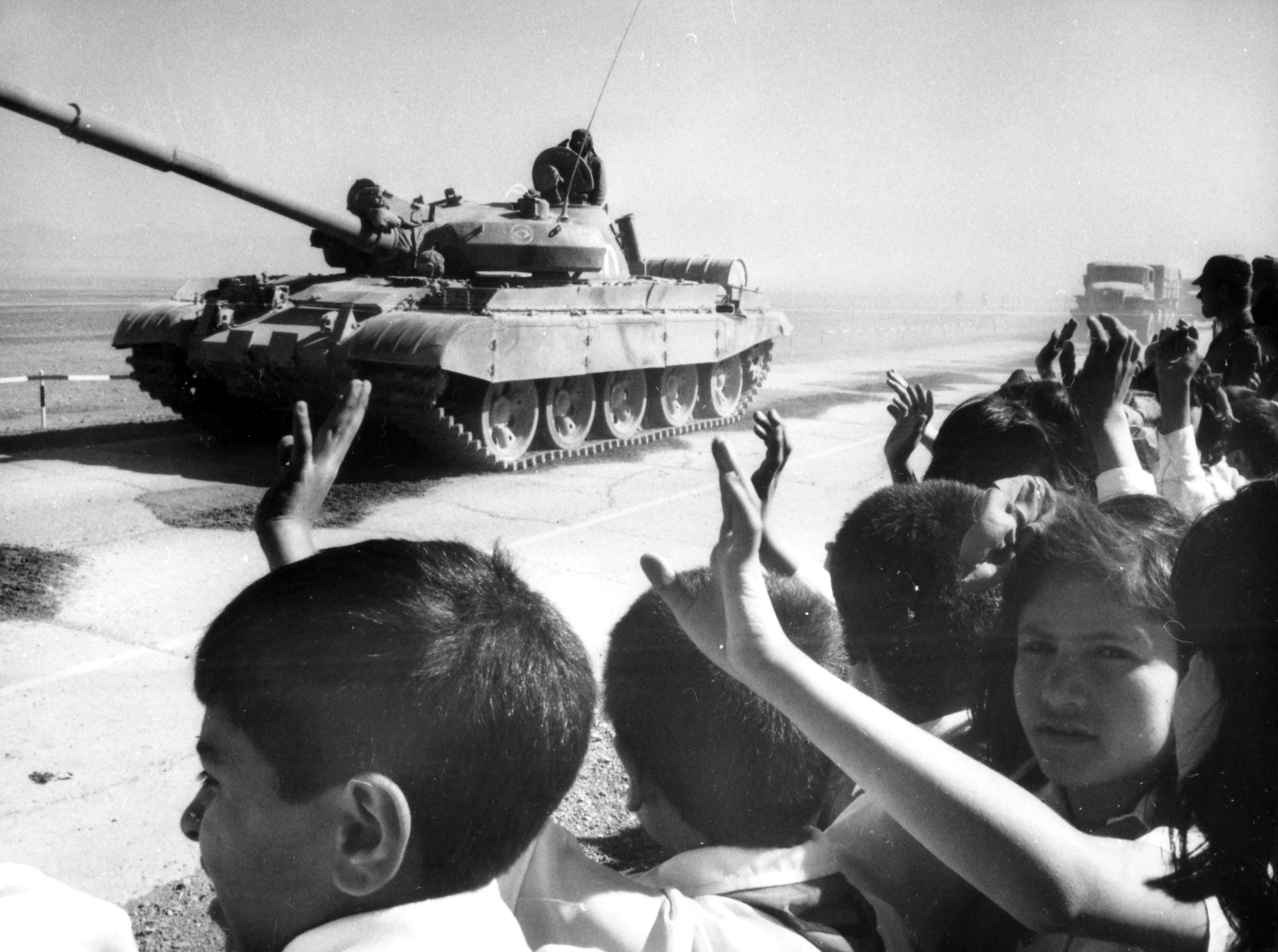
A Soviet T-62M of the "Berlin" tank regiment which was a part of the 5th Guards Motor Rifle Division, leaving Afghanistan, 1 January 1987

During the Soviet–Afghan War, the T-62 was a primary tank used by the Soviet army. The Soviets used tanks in several ways, with the use of many in fire support bases, while others were employed for convoy protection or as infantry support. Towards the end of the war T-62Ms, using the BDD appliqué armour, appeared in large numbers. According to US sources, nearly 325 T-62s fell victim to Mujahideen attacks, especially from anti-tank mines and RPGs, although this number is directly contradicted by Soviet sources, which show far fewer losses. Others fell into the hands of the Afghan Mujahideen after they were left behind by withdrawing Soviet forces.

The USSR officially confirmed the loss of 147 T-62 and T-55 tanks during the war.

=== Russia ===
Russian losses of T-62 tanks
Year	Number
1996	8
2008	1
2022	67
2023	33
2024	118

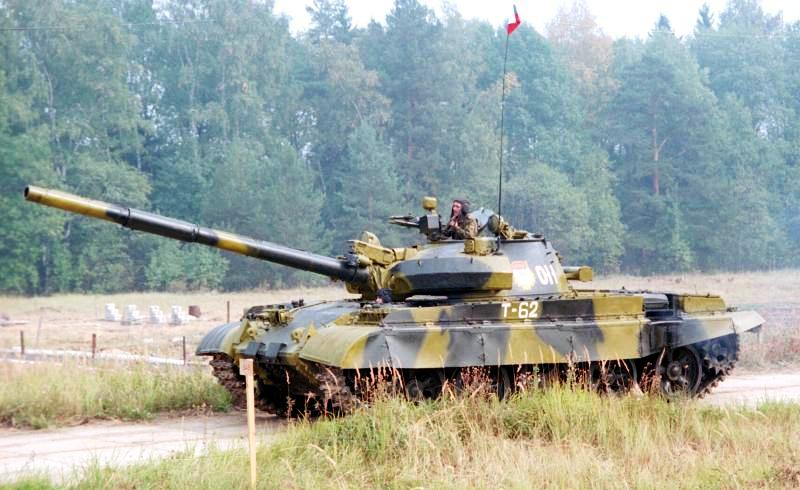
Russian T-62M in 2002

The T-62 and T-55 are now mostly used by Russian reserve units for a possible secondary mobilization while some are kept in storage. The active duty and primary mobilization units mainly use the T-80, T-72 and T-64, with a smaller number of T-90 tanks in service in active units. They were retired from active combat service after the 2008 Russo-Georgian War to be put in storage to be reactivated in case of war. During the Vostok 2018 military exercise, multiple T-62M and T-62MVs were reactivated from storage and mobilised, in an effort to assess how quickly Russian forces could be readied for a major conflict.

==== War in Chechnya ====
The Russian army and the Russian MVD forces used both T-62s and T-62Ms in combat in Chechnya.

During the second war the 160th Guards Tank Regiment (5th Guards Tank Division, Siberian Military District) and the 93rd MVD Mechanized Tank Regiment each had 69 T-62 tanks. Some T-62s were used on train platforms. Up to 380 Russian tanks were used in 1999–2000, including about 150 T-62s.

==== 2008 South Ossetia war ====
T-62s of the Russian Ground Forces were deployed in the Russo-Georgian war. In one case a T-62M belonging to the Russian army was destroyed by a Georgian RPG in the streets of Tskhinvali. In this instance the rocket penetrated the turret of the T-62M, killing the driver and gunner. Russian MVD also used T-62s.

==== Russo-Ukrainian war ====
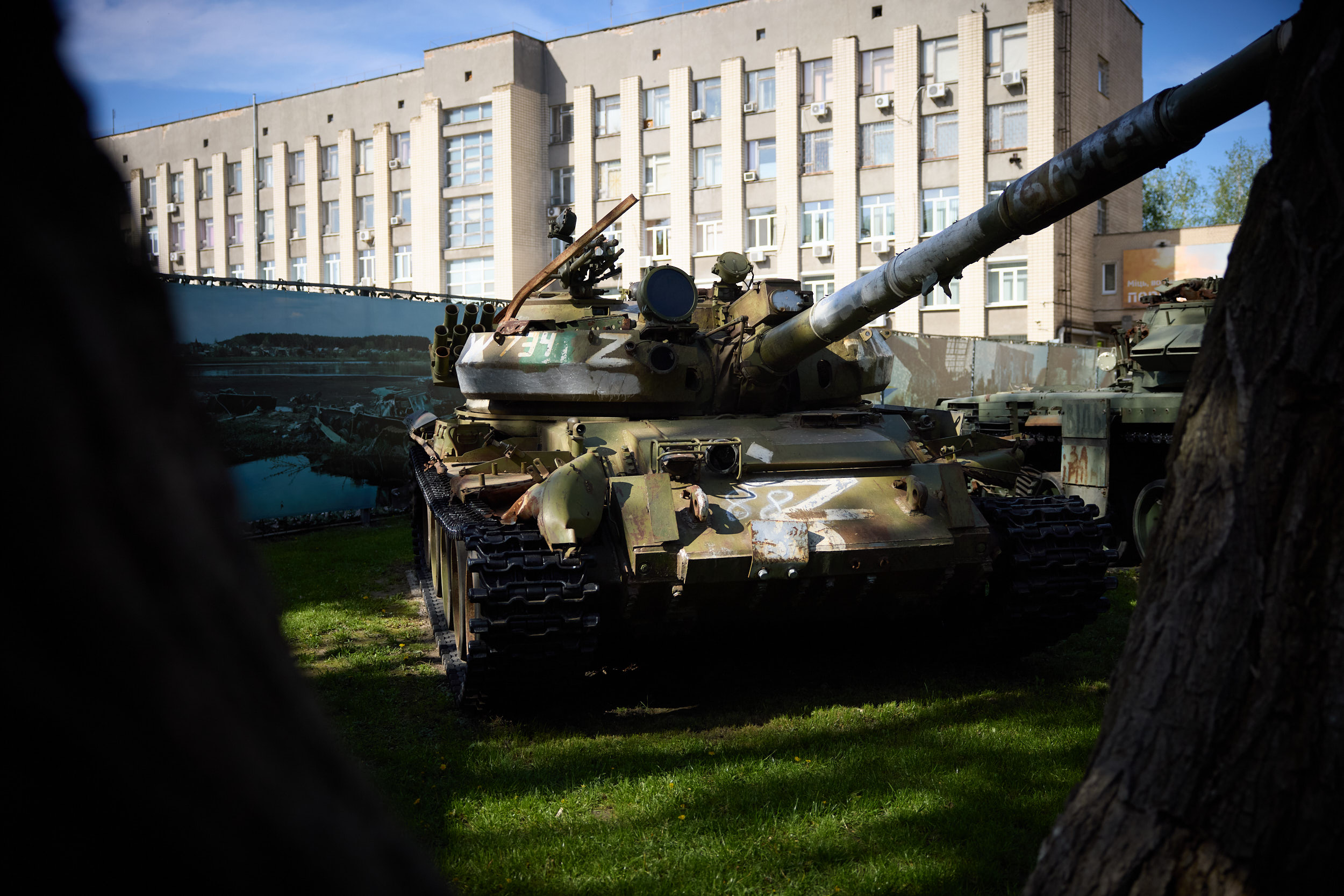
Russian T-62M inscribed with the Z symbol on display at the National Defence University of Ukraine, April 2024

Since May 2022, Russia has deployed T-62 tanks in Ukraine. Ukrainian intelligence reported that Russia had reactivated these tanks from storage depots in Siberia. By late May, T-62Ms and T-62MVs were transported by train to Ukraine, with additional reports indicating more T-62 tanks being sent towards Mykolaiv and Kryvyi Rih on June 5. In early June, T-62 tanks equipped with improvised slat armor, similar to that used on more modern Russian T-72 and T-80 tanks, were identified in Kherson Oblast.

Later in June, the Head of North Ossetia–Alania, Sergey Menyaylo, announced that volunteers in the Alania Battalion had received a tank unit equipped with T-62 tanks. According to the Russian website Voennoe Obozrenie, these tanks were primarily intended to support infantry units and were not expected to engage Ukrainian tanks directly.

In Kherson, Russian forces utilized T-62 tanks to provide artillery support. In October 2022, during a visit at the 103rd Armor Repair Plant, State Duma member Andrey Gurulyov declared that the Russian military would receive 800 T-62s in the following three years. These tanks would be refurbished and possibly upgraded before being sent to Ukraine.

In February 2023, a Ukrainian mechanic stated that his shop was converting at least one captured T-62 into an armored recovery vehicle, remarking that "this old tank is no good for war." Also, in late February 2023, a T-62 was identified with its original TSh-2B-41 or TShSM-41U sight replaced by a 1PN96MT-02 analogue thermal gunner's sight.

Ukraine is converting some T-62s into infantry fighting vehicles by fitting BMP-2 turrets to the hulls, armed with a 30mm 2A42 autocannon.

On September 10, 2023, it was reported that Ukraine's 128th Mountain Assault Brigade converted a captured T-62 tank into a vehicle-borne improvised explosive device (VBIED) filled with 1.5 tons of explosives and drove it towards Russian positions in the Zaporizhzhia region. The tank hit a mine and exploded before it could reach the enemy positions.

As of January 2026, Russia is visually confirmed to have suffered 327 T-62 losses (6 T-62 Obr. 1967, 2 T-62 Obr. 1972, 1 T-62 Obr. 1975, 154 T-62M, 62 T-62M Obr. 2022, 41 T-62MV, 10 T-62MV Obr. 2022 and 51 Unknown T-62).

=== Foreign service ===
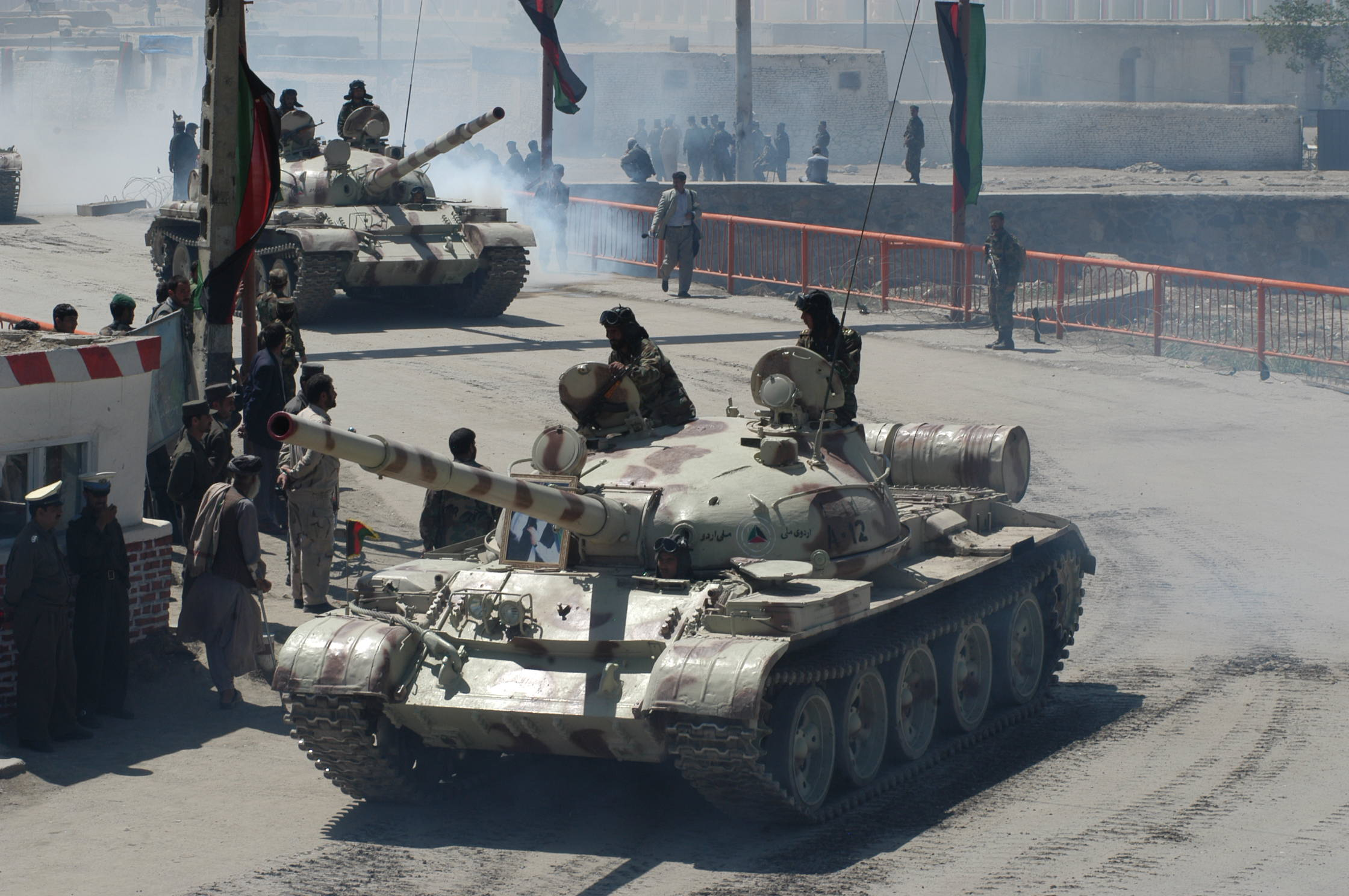
T-62s of the Afghan National Army in Kabul, April 2004

==== Angola ====
The People's Armed Forces for the Liberation of Angola (FAPLA) began ordering T-62s from the Soviet Union in 1980 and received them by late 1985. Most of the tanks were delivered in the wake of Operation Askari, which saw multiple T-54s and T-55s knocked out by South African expeditionary forces using light anti-tank weapons and highly mobile Eland-90 and Ratel-90 armoured cars. As a result of the destruction and capture of Angolan T-54/55s during Operation Askari, the Soviet military mission in Angola committed to drastically accelerate the transfer of more sophisticated weaponry to FAPLA, including T-62s. According to the Stockholm International Peace Research Institute, FAPLA had received 175 second-hand T-62s from Soviet reserve stocks by the end of 1985. South African intelligence reported that no more than 30 were in active service between late 1985 and 1986, possibly because most of the FAPLA crews were still being trained.

FAPLA deployed its T-62s for the first time during Operation Second Congress, a failed 1986 offensive against the National Union for the Total Independence of Angola (UNITA) near Mavinga. A number of T-62s were lost during the 1986 campaign, with some being abandoned on the battlefield and others destroyed by UNITA insurgents or South African air strikes. FAPLA T-62s were present during the initial phase of Operation Saluting October, a similar offensive undertaken the following year, but did not see action in the ensuing 1987-88 Battle of Cuito Cuanavale. FAPLA ordered another 135 T-62s from the Soviet Union to replace tank losses in 1987. Another 24 were purchased from Bulgaria and taken into service by the new Angolan Armed Forces in 1993.

==== Bulgaria ====
The only other Warsaw Pact member to operate T-62s on a mass scale was Bulgaria which bought 250 T-62s, which were delivered between 1970 and 1974. After the war in Afghanistan, Bulgaria received a number of T-62s from the Soviet Union in the 1980s. These were modified, but due to several problems were quickly withdrawn from service; some were sold to Angola and Yemen. Many were converted into TV-62 and TV-62M armoured recovery vehicles, their turrets being scrapped. The TV-62M is the standard armoured recovery vehicle of the Bulgarian Army.

==== Other Warsaw Pact members ====
Both Poland and Czechoslovakia evaluated the vehicle but refused it because of the high price and low update value compared to the T-55.

==== Israel ====
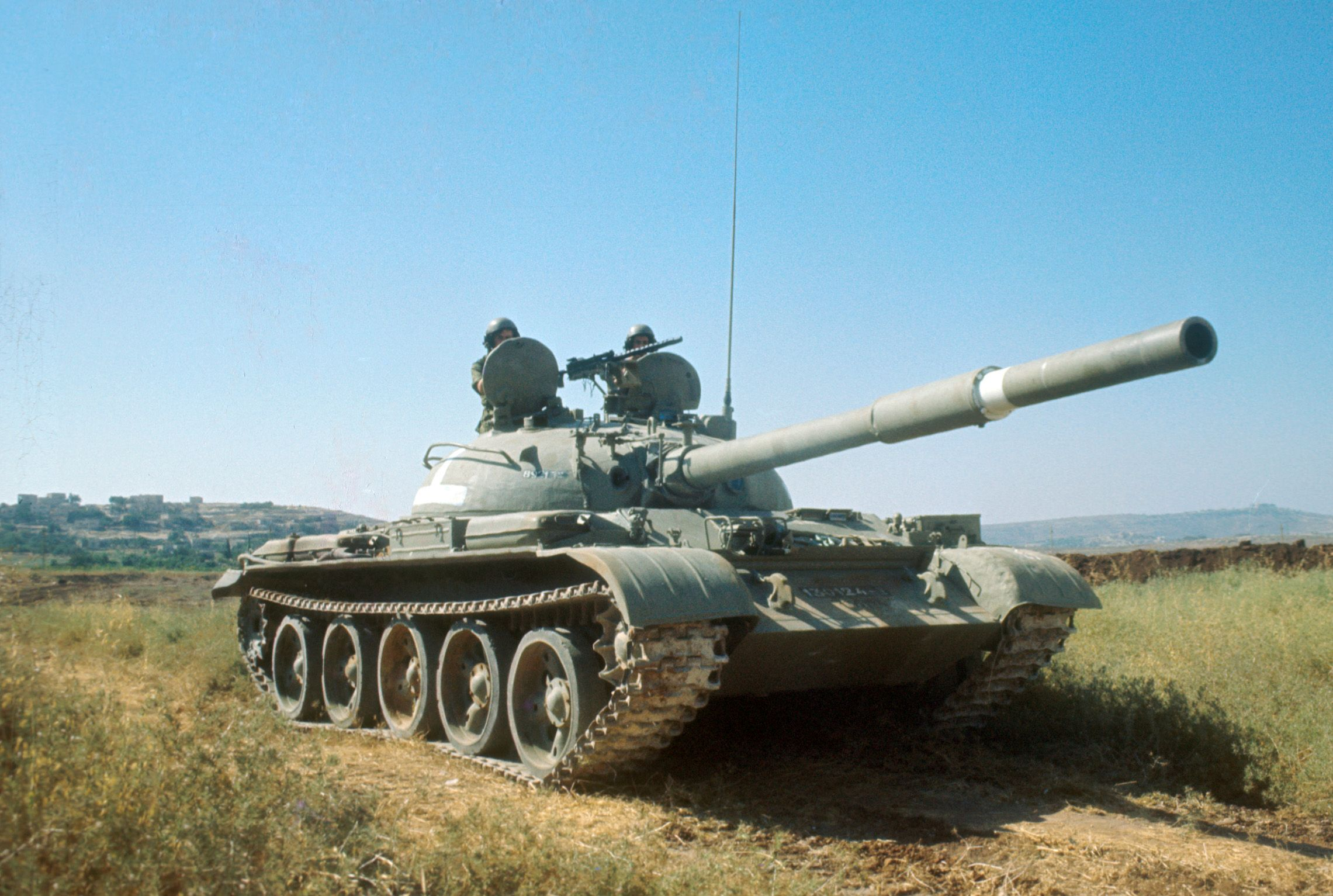
Israeli Tiran-6, likely captured from the Syrians or Egyptians in the Yom Kippur War

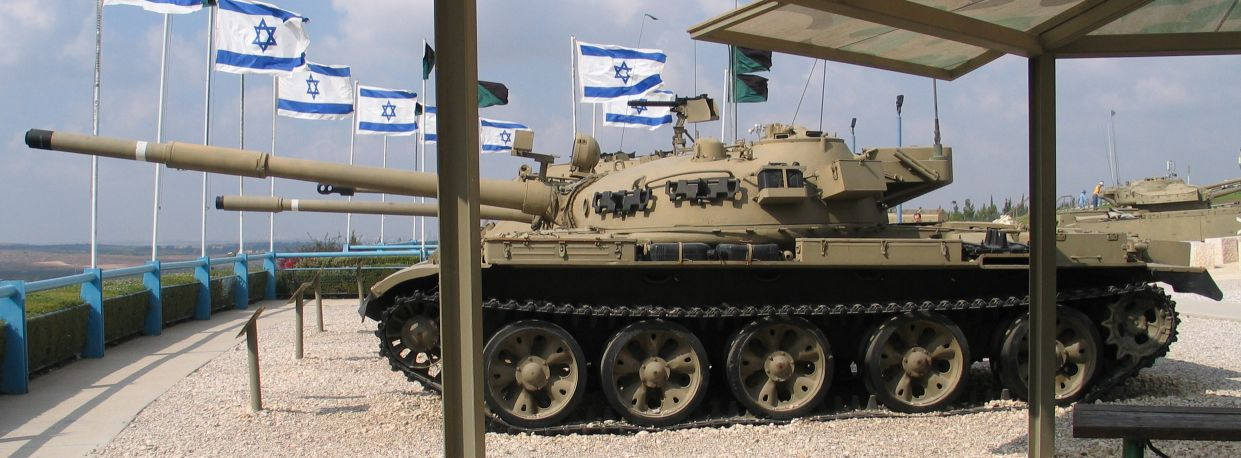
A Tiran-6 at Yad La-Shiryon

Before 1973, Israeli intelligence confirmed T-62 tanks had arrived in Egypt. In response, Israeli commandos raided Egyptian positions in order to capture the tanks and analyze them. During the Yom Kippur War, the T-62 was an effective adversary for Israeli Patton and Centurion main battle tanks armed with 105 mm tank guns. The T-62 had an advantage in its better night-fighting capability, but Syrian losses were heavy.

The Israelis captured hundreds of these tanks from the Syrians in 1973, and put some of them into service as the Tiran-3. About 120 Tiran-3 were modernised and received the designation Tiran-6. Only a small number were converted because the new US-made M60 main battle tanks started arriving in Israel.

A small tank brigade consisting of two enlarged tank regiments, each equipped with 46 Tiran-6 tanks, was formed. The Tiran-6 is used by reserve units. The Israelis have sold the rest to assorted countries.

Israel sent a number of captured T-62 tanks to the U.S. Army and Germany for examination purposes.

==== Iraq ====
In 1974, the Iraqi Army acquired 100 T-62s and 600 more in 1976, which were delivered through to 1979. In 1982 a further 2,150 were ordered, which were delivered through to 1989.

===== Kurdish Conflict =====
These tanks saw service in the Iraqi–Kurdish conflict from 1974 to 1991.

===== Iran-Iraq War =====
In the Iran–Iraq War, Iraqi T-62s performed well against opposing Iranian tanks, such as M47s, M48s, M60A1s and Chieftains. In Operation Nasr, the biggest tank battle of the war, Iran lost 214 Chieftain and M60A1 tanks, while Iraq lost 45 T-62s. The remaining Iranian armour turned about and withdrew. Approximately 200 T-62s were lost in the entire war.

===== Gulf War =====
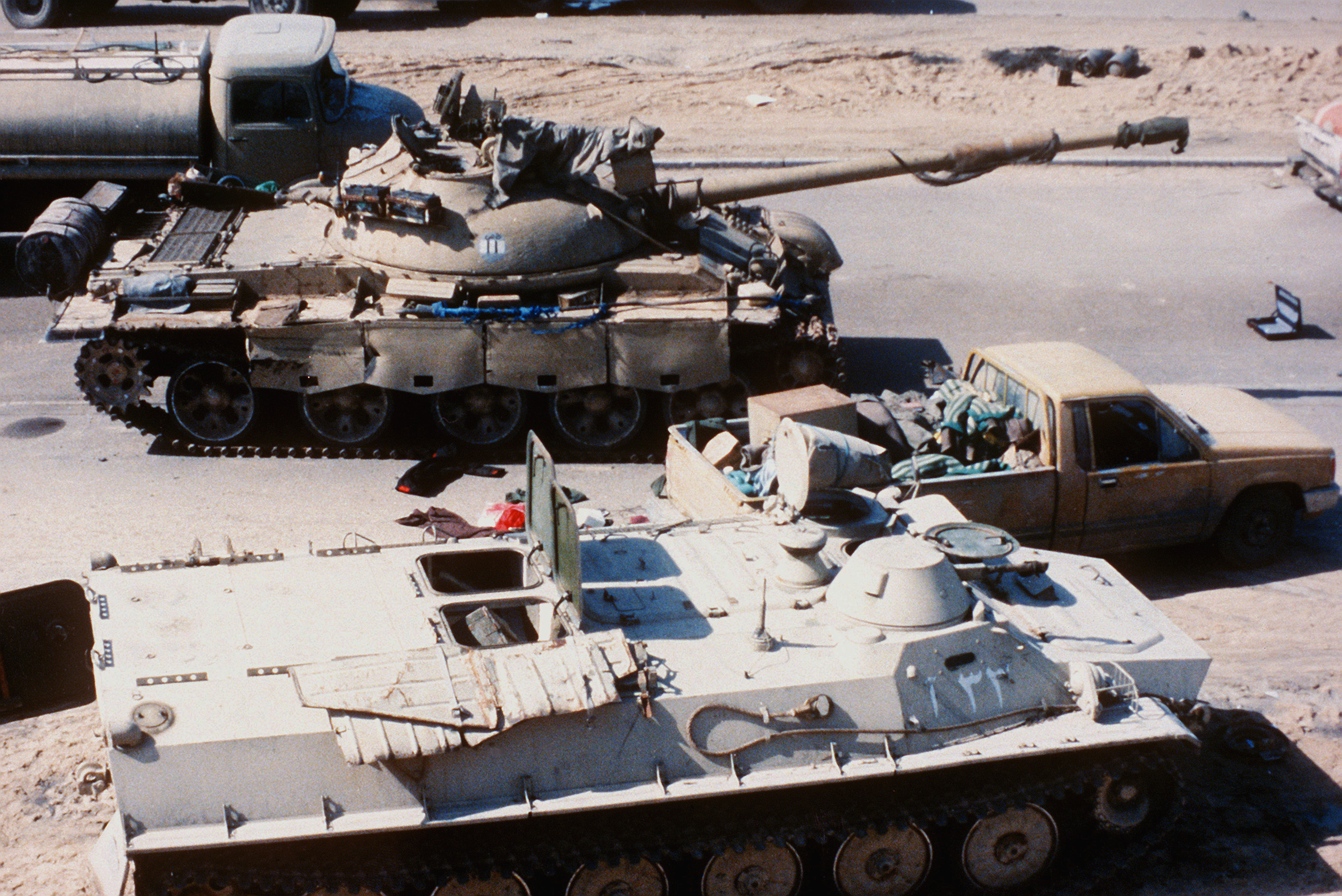
Abandoned Iraqi T-62 and military vehicles on the Highway of Death

Iraqi-operated T-62s were badly outperformed by the American M1 Abrams, M2/M3 Bradley infantry fighting vehicles and the British Challenger 1 tanks in the 1990–1991 Gulf War. The lack of high powered optics, thermal sights and ballistic computers of Iraqi tanks compared to their adversaries made the T-62 and other Iraqi armoured fighting vehicles extremely vulnerable and unable to retaliate against Coalition vehicles. The Iraqi 3rd Armoured Division alone lost about a hundred T-62 tanks, while no Abrams or Challengers were lost to enemy fire.

==== Libya ====
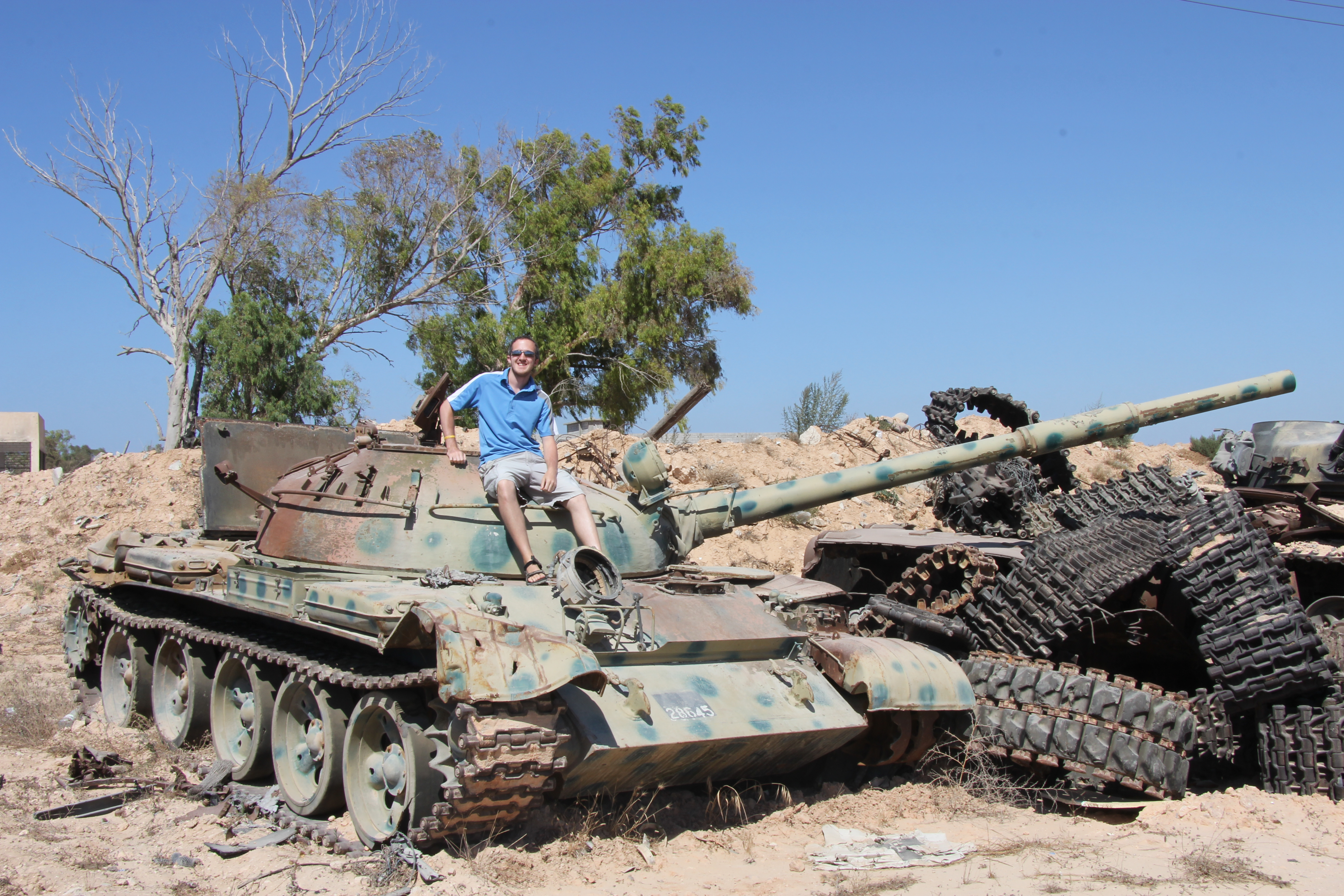
Wrecked Libyan T-62 outside of Misrata, 2012

Libyan T-62s were first deployed against the Chadian National Armed Forces (FANT) in the Aouzou Strip around September 1986. The tanks also formed an integral part of a brigade-sized, combined arms task force ordered to drive Chadian troops loyal to the Transitional Government of National Unity (GUNT) from the Tibesti Mountains the following December. During the Toyota War, a few T-62s were destroyed at medium range by MILAN anti-tank missiles mounted on Chadian technicals. According to French after-action reports released in March 1988, several were also knocked out by FANT Panhard AML-90 armoured cars with flank or rear shots.

==== Cuba ====
The first T-62s arrived in Cuba in 1976. Currently approximately 400 are in service with the Cuban armed forces and about 100 are in storage. They are modernised to the T-62M standard with additional armour, laser equipment and fire control systems.

A Cuban armoured brigade with T-62s saw action against the Somali National Army during the Ogaden War in Ethiopia. Cuban T-62s were deployed to Angola during Havana's lengthy intervention in that country. Along with T-55s and T-54Bs, they were initially utilitised for defending strategic installations, such as Matala, the site of an important Angolan hydroelectric plant manned by Soviet engineers. The more ubiquitous T-55 was favoured for combat duty, and during the Battle of Cuito Cuanavale only a single battalion of Cuban T-62s was situated near the fighting.

Circumstances changed in March 1988, when Cuba began marshalling a combined arms division to carry out a flanking manoeuvre towards the South-West African (Namibian) border. It included a brigade with at least 40 T-62s. The Cuban tanks clashed with defending South African armoured units at Cuamato and again at Calueque without sustaining any known losses.

== Variants ==
=== Soviet Union ===
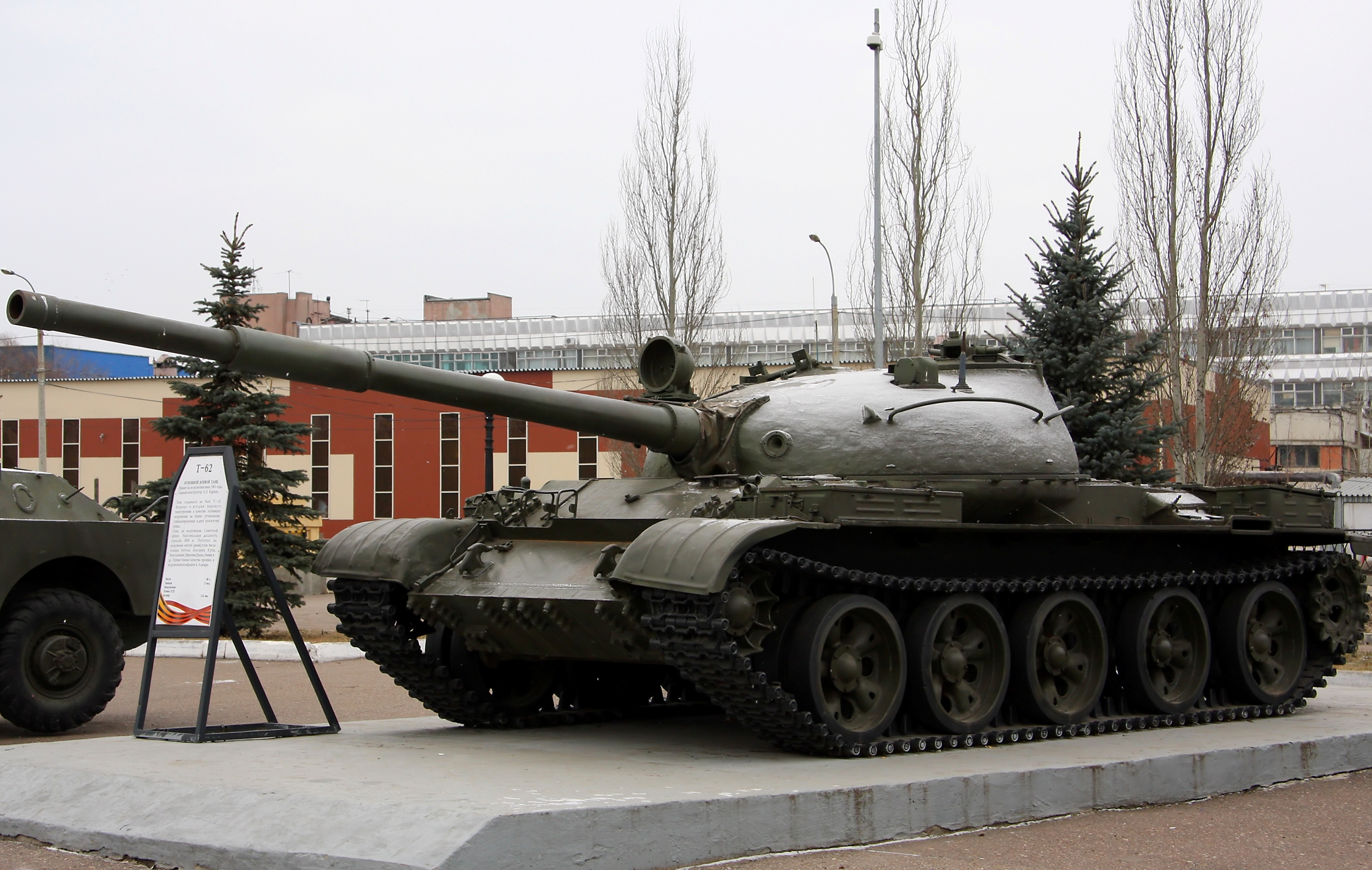
Early T-62 variant without roof machine gun mounts

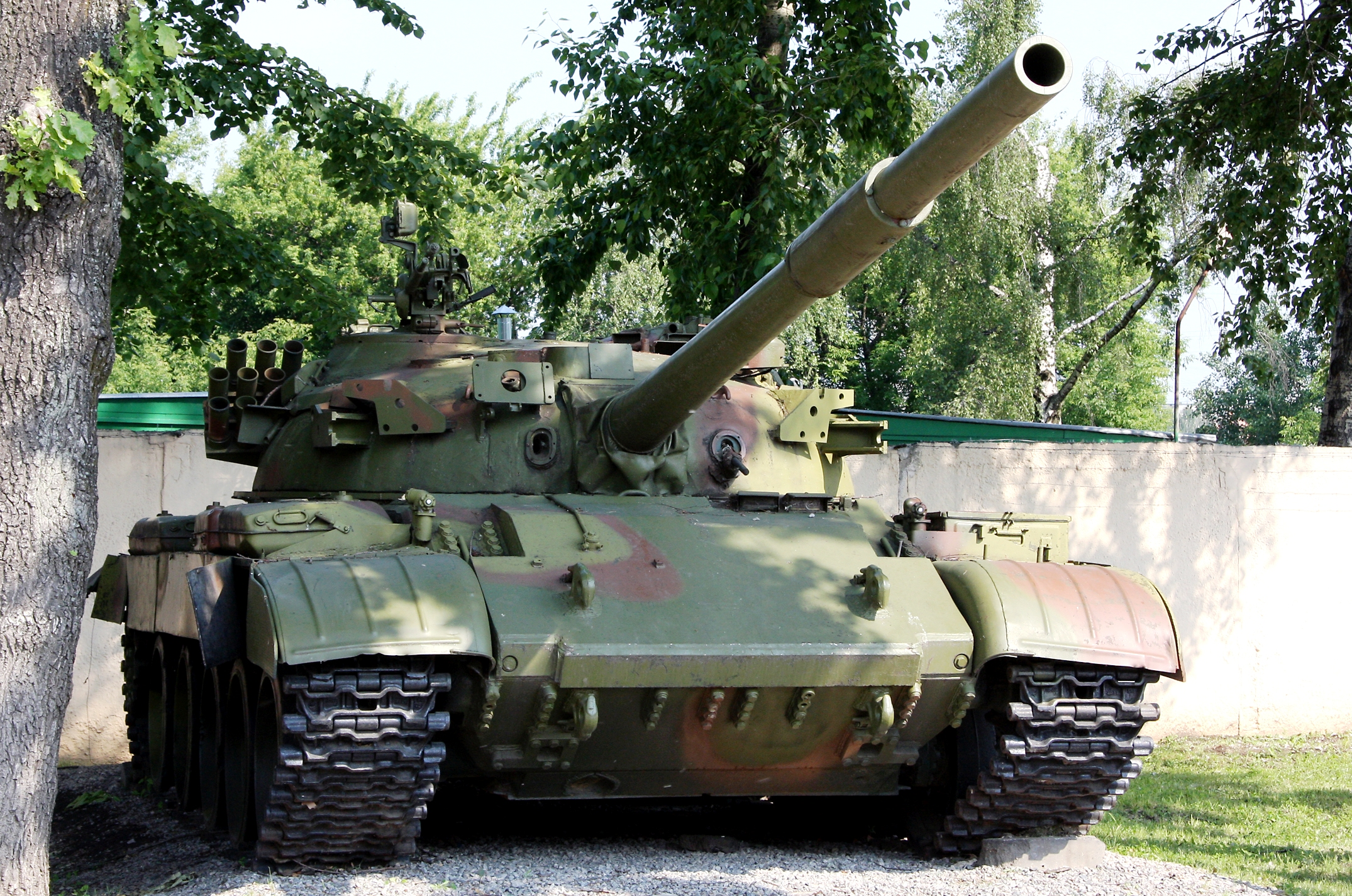
T-62D at Moscow Suvorov Military School. Note the "Drozd" system is missing on this tank.

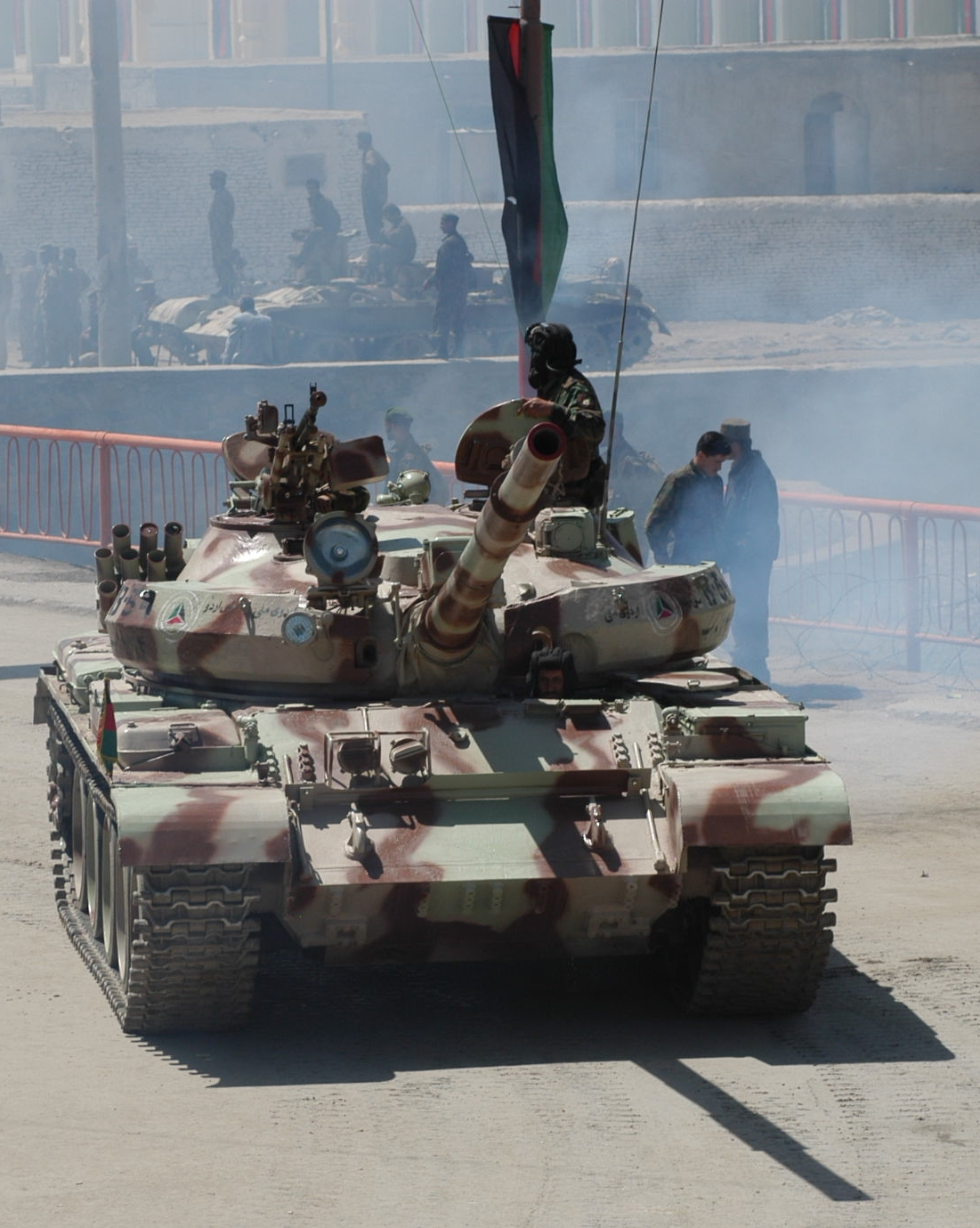
A front view of a T-62M of the Afghan National Army in Kabul, 2004

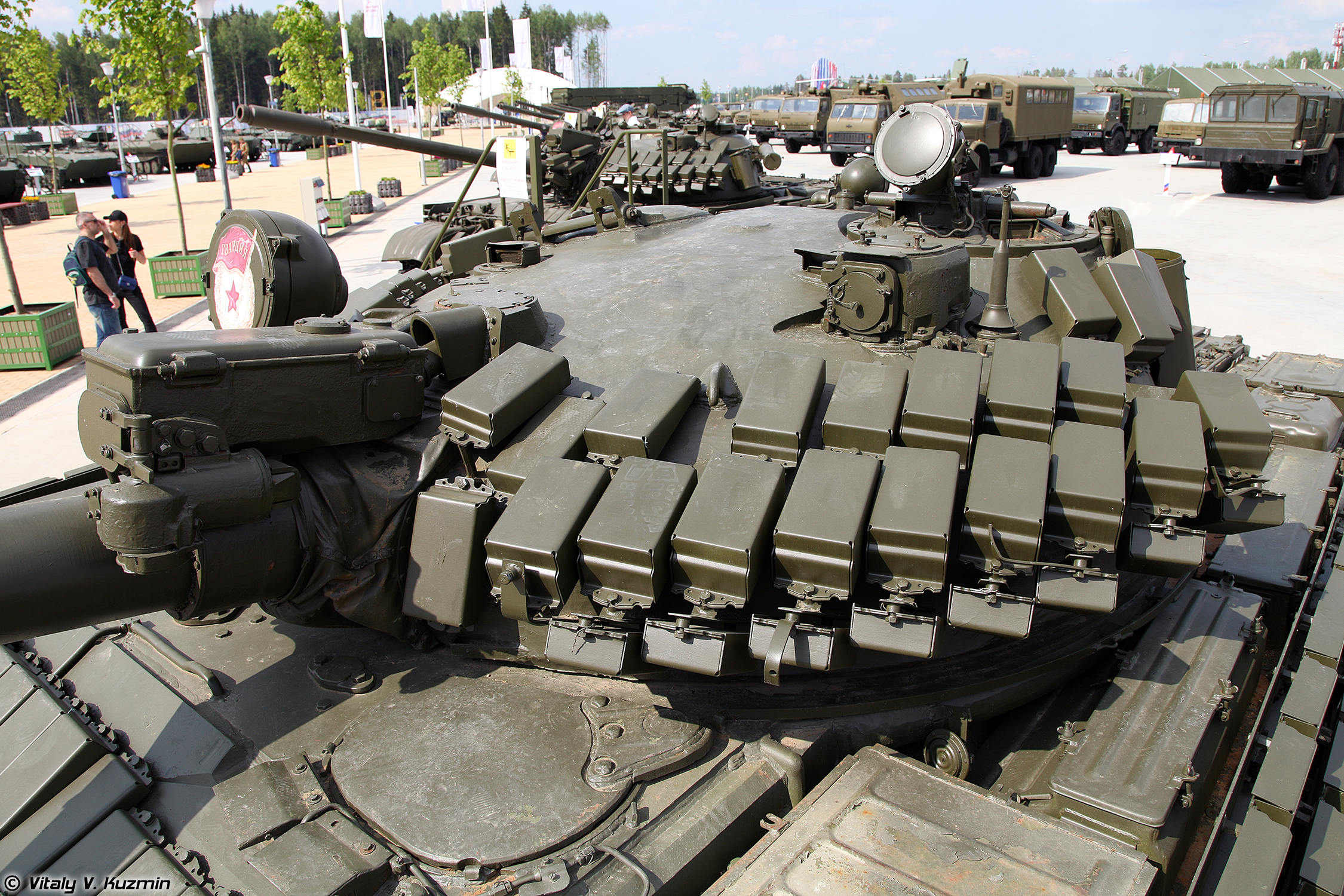
Kontakt-1 ERA on the frontal turret of T-62MV. Note the laser rangefinder box above the main gun.

- T-62A (Ob'yekt 165) – Predecessor of T-62. It was essentially a stretched T-55 chassis with a 2245 mm turret ring, a new suspension, and an Ob'yekt 140 turret modernised with the addition of a spent-cartridge ejector; tank gun equipped with the "Kometa" two-plane stabiliser. Only five entered service.
  - T-62 Obr. 1960 (Ob'yekt 166) – Original production model equipped with the 115 mm U-5TS "Molot" (2A20) Rapira smoothbore tank gun with a "Meteor" two-plane stabiliser. It has a TKN-3 commander's day/night sight, TSh-2B-41 gunner day sight with 3.5/7x magnification and TPN1–41–11 night sight. It carries 40 rounds for the main gun and 2500 rounds for the PKT coaxial general-purpose machine gun. The V-55V engine produces 581 hp (433 kW). It has a commander's cupola welded to turret.
    - T-62K (Ob'yekt 166K) (K stands for komandirskaya ["command"]) (1964) – T-62 command variant. It is fitted with an R-112 (or R-130) radio, an AB-1 APU and an antenna base on top of the turret. The ammunition load was decreased to 36 for the main gun and 1,750 rounds for the coaxial general-purpose machine gun. It was mainly used by company and battalion commanders.
      - T-62KN (Ob'yekt 166KN) – T-62K fitted with additional TNA-2 navigation aids.
    - Ob'yekt 167 – T-62 fitted with a V-26 engine which with a use of charger develops 700 hp (522 kW). It has a 9M14 Malyutka (NATO: AT-3 Sagger) ATGM launcher on the rear of turret and a new chassis with return rollers and smaller road wheels. Not produced. Only two prototypes were made.
      - Ob'yekt 167T – Ob'yekt 167 fitted with a GTD-3T gas turbine engine.
    - T-62 Obr. 1967 – T-62 Obr.1960 with a slightly modified engine deck and an OPVT deep wading system
      - T-62 Obr. 1972 – T-62 Obr.1967 with a DShK 1938/46 machine gun installed on the loader's hatch. The tank is fitted with an improved fording attachment. It is sometimes incorrectly called T-62A and T-62M.
        - T-62 Obr. 1975 – T-62 Obr.1972 equipped with a KTD-1 or KTD-2 laser rangefinder in an armoured box over the main armament. It has concealed bolts around the commander's cupola.
          - T-62D (Ob'yekt 166D) (D stands for Drozd [thrush]) (1983) – T-62 Obr.1975 equipped with KAZ 1030M "Drozd" active protection system (APS), BDD appliqué armour on the glacis plate only and new V-55U diesel engine.
            - T-62D-1 (Objekt 166D-1) – T-62D fitted with a new V-46–5M diesel engine.
          - T-62M (Ob'yekt 166M) (1983) – Extensive modernization of the T-62 with protection and mobility improvements and the "Volna" fire control system. It is fitted with a BDD appliqué armour package, an additional belly armour plate for anti-mine protection, 10 mm thick reinforced rubber side skirts and 10 mm thick anti-neutron liner. The BDD appliqué armour package brings the frontal armour to nearly equivalent to the early T-64A and T-72 Ural and consists of an appliqué plate on the glacis and two horseshoe shaped blocks fitted to the front of the turret. This armour should be proof against all 84mm and 90mm tank gun rounds at all ranges, 105mm APDS and HEAT, 84mm and 106mm recoilless rifle HEAT rounds and many 1st generation anti-tank missiles as well as the M72A3 LAW and RPG-7. The handrails around the turret have been removed to make space for the BDD appliqué armour. Fastenings for four spare track chain links have been added on the side of the turret. The tank is fitted with RhKM tracks from the T-72 main battle tank and two additional shock absorbers on the first pair of road wheels. The "Volna" fire control system was improved by fitting the KTD-2 (or KTD-1) laser rangefinder in an armoured box over the main armament. There is a new TShSM-41U gunner's sight, new commander's sight, "Meteor-M1" stabiliser, BV-62 ballistic computer and 9K116-2 "Sheksna" (NATO: AT-10 Stabber) guided missile unit with 1K13-BOM sight (it is both a night sight and ATGM launcher sight but cannot be used for both functions simultaneously) which allows the tank to fire 9M117 Bastion ATGMs through its gun tube. The tank was fitted with a gun thermal sleeve, new radios, the R-173 radio set instead of R-123M and a new V-55U diesel engine developing 620 hp (462 kW). The ammunition load was increased by two rounds. Some are fitted with two clusters of four smoke grenade launchers each on the right rear of the turret. US intelligence saw T-62M tanks for the first time during the Soviet–Afghan War and they gave it the designation T-62E. There are a number of sub-variants of the T-62M, depending on how much of the modernization package the vehicle has installed.
            - T-62M-1 (Ob'yekt 166M-1) – T-62M fitted with a V-46–5M diesel engine.
            - T-62M1 (Ob'yekt 166M1) – T-62M fitted with a revised frontal armour layout on the hull and a normal night sight. It does not have ATGM capability.
              - T-62M1–1 (Ob'yekt 166M1–1) – T-62M1 fitted with the V-46–5M diesel engine.
              - T-62M1–2 (Ob'yekt 166M1–2) – T-62M1 without belly armour or the BDD armour package.
                - T-62M1–2–1 (Ob'yekt 166M1–2–1) – T-62M1–2 fitted with the V-46–5M diesel engine.
            - T-62MD (Ob'yekt 166MD) (D stands for Drozd ["thrush"]) – T-62M fitted with KAZ 1030M "Drozd" active protection system (APS).
              - T-62MD-1 (Ob'yekt 166MD-1) – T-62MD fitted with V-46–5M diesel engine.
            - T-62MK (Ob'yekt 166MK) (K stands for komandirskaya ["command"]) – T-62M command variant. It does not have ATGM capability but has TNA-2 navigation aids, additional R-112 and R-113 radio sets and an AB-1 auxiliary engine to power the additional radios. The tank has a lower ammunition load for both the main gun and the coaxial general-purpose machine gun.
              - T-62MK-1 (Ob'yekt 166MK-1) – T-62MK fitted with the V-46–5M diesel engine.
            - T-62MV (Ob'yekt 166MV) (1985) (V stands for vzryvnoi – ["explosive"]) – Fitted with "Kontakt-1" explosive reactive armour (ERA) on the sides of the hull, the glacis plate, and in the front of the turret (where it replaces the BDD appliqué armour).
              - T-62MV-1 (Ob'yekt 166MV-1) – T-62MV fitted with the V-46–5M diesel engine.
              - T-62M1V (Ob'yekt 166M1V) – T-62MV without ATGM capability.
                - T-62M1V-1 (Ob'yekt 166M1V-1) – T-62M1V fitted with a V-46–5M diesel engine.
        - T-62 (Ob'yekt 169) – T-62 fitted with smoke dischargers at turret front.
    - T-62 fitted with a box on the rear of the turret containing anti-aircraft missiles.
    - T-62 fitted with the ZET-1 (ZET stands for Zaschtschita Ekrannaja Tankowaja) vehicle protection system. The system was developed in 1964 and was specially designed to protect the tank's front and sides up to an angle of 25° against shaped-charge projectiles with of a maximum caliber of 115 mm. It consisted of a stretchable screen with net structure centered on the vehicle's main armament and lateral flipper-type sideskirts. It was intended for T-54, T-55 and T-62 tanks. The diameter of the screens was different for each tank type. The individual screen sections could be replaced in two minutes. While it was successful in wide open spaces, it was an impractical in wooded areas. Because of that the development was not heavily used, although the flipper-type sideskirts were later used in the initial T-72 models.
    - T-62 experimentally fitted with a "Zhelud" autoloader.
    - T-62/122 – T-62 based combat engineering vehicle rearmed with 122 mm howitzer.
    - T-62/160 – T-62 based combat engineer vehicle fitted with BTU and armed with a shortened 160 mm mortar.
    - T-67 – T-62 armed with a 125 mm tank gun and fitted with a drive train from the T-72 main battle tank.
    - TO-62 – T-62 converted into a flamethrower tank. The flamethrower has an effective range of 100 meters and is mounted coaxially with the 115 mm gun.
    - IT-1 (Ob'yekt 150) – T-62 converted into a tank destroyer (istrebitel' tankov). It was developed between 1957 and 1962. It utilised the chassis and the hull of the T-62 tank and was fitted with a new low 'flattened dome' turret with a stabilised 2K8 ATGM system instead of the tank gun. The IT-1 was the only one of several "rocket tank" ('raketniy tank') designs that actually entered service. It could launch radio-guided semi-automatic PTUR 3M7 "Drakon" ATGMs with a range between 300 m and 3,300 m. It carried 15 PTUR 3M7 "Drakon" ATGMs on board (3 in reserve and 12 in the autoloader). The ATGM was launched from an arm rising through the roof of the turret. The secondary armament consisted of a 7.62 mm PKT general-purpose machine gun for which it carried 2,000 rounds. The turret was fitted with T2-PD and UPN-S day/night sights. About 60 IT-1 tank destroyers were built between 1968 and 1970 by various companies including 20 built by the Uralvagonzavod factory in 1970. Only two battalions operated them, one with artillery personnel and one with tank personnel, with one battalion in Belarus MD and the other one in the Carpathian MD. The units were disbanded after the withdrawal of the IT-1 and all the vehicles were converted to armoured recovery vehicles (ARVs).
      - IT-1T (T after IT-1 stands for tyagach ["tractor"]) – After the withdrawal of the IT-1 from front-line service many of the vehicles were partially converted to ARVs. The only differences from the standard IT-1 was that the turret was fixed in position after all the ATGM gear was removed. They were not very successful and were soon converted into the BTS-4V armoured recovery vehicles.
    - BTS-4V (BTS stands for bronirovannij tyagach, srednij ["medium armoured tractor"]) – Conversion of T-62 main battle tanks and IT-1 tank destroyers into a turretless ARV. They are similar to the much more common T-54 -based BTS-4. The vehicle was fitted with a stowage basket, a hoist and a small folding crane with a capacity of 3 tonnes, a winch, and a snorkel. It is also known as BTS-4U.
      - BTS-4V1 – Conversion of approximatively 35 pre-production T-62 main battle tanks into ARVs.
    - BTS-4V2 – Partial conversion of 20 T-62 main battle tanks damaged by fire into an armoured recovery vehicle. The turret was replaced by a dome-shaped fixed superstructure. There is a single hatch on top of the superstructure fitted with a 12.7 mm DShK 1938/46 antiaircraft heavy machine gun. It was limited to basic towing operations and most were disposed of by giving them away as foreign aid. They were also known as BTS-4VZ.
    - Impuls-2M – Decommissioned T-62 tank converted into a fire fighting vehicle fitted with a 50-round launch system for flame-retarding projectiles on a rotatable mount in the turret ring and a dozer blade on the front.

=== Algeria ===
- BMPT-62 (sometimes called Algerian Terminator in reference to the BMPT Terminator) – A fire support vehicle developed from leftover T-62 tanks and Berezhok turrets. The vehicle was presented at the 60th anniversary parade of Algeria’s independence.

=== Bulgaria ===
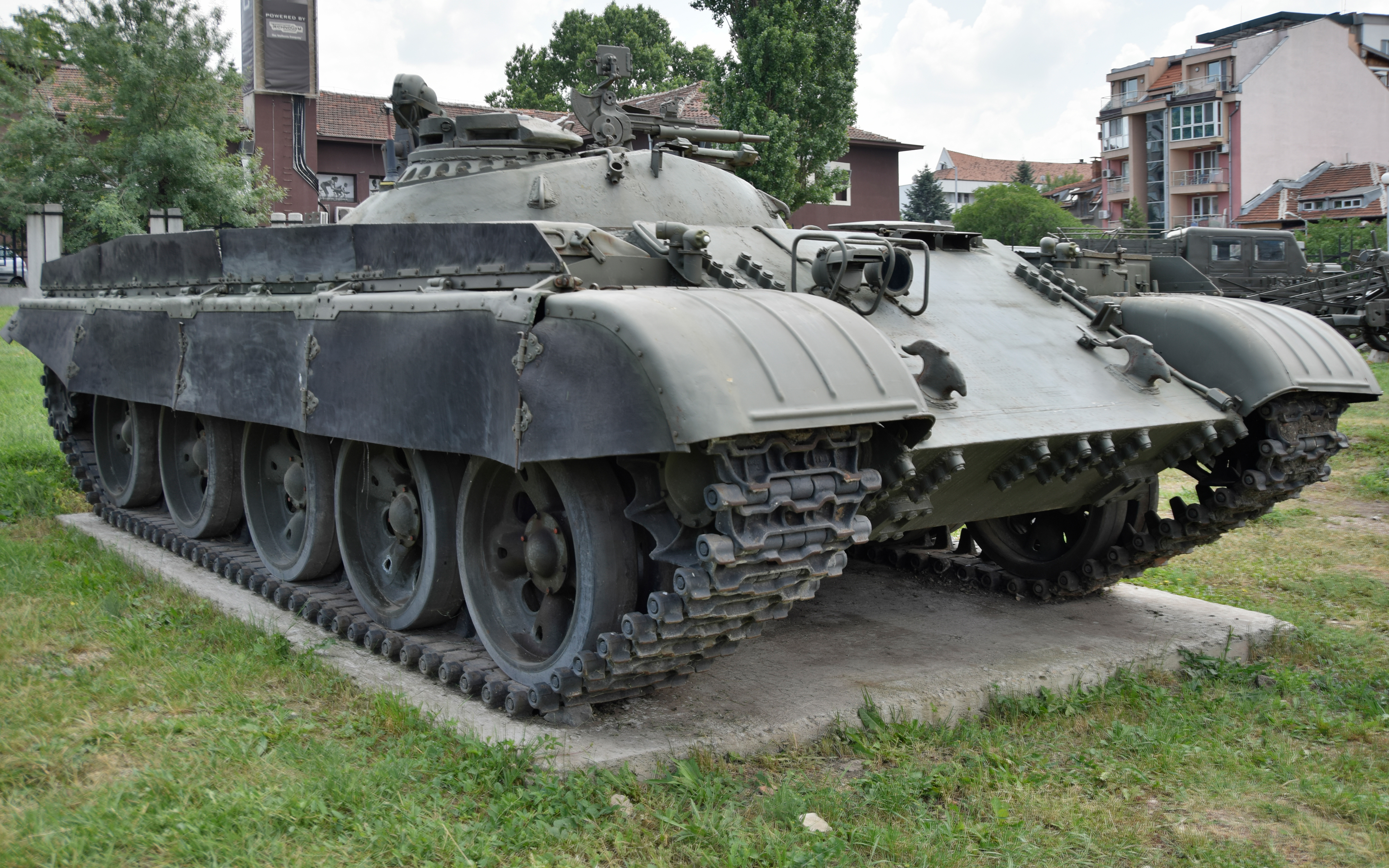
Bulgarian TV-62 ARV variant

- TV-62 – T-62 tank converted into an armoured recovery vehicle.
- T-62 modification.
- TV-62M – T-62M tank converted into an armoured recovery vehicle. This vehicle is composed of a T-62M hull with a modified T-55 or T-55A turret which was cut in half; the upper part was bolted onto the hull in the 6 o'clock position. There is a large winch and a snorkel mounted on the rear of the hull.
- TP-62 – fire fighting vehicle, for the first time presented during the Hemus 2008 defense equipment trade show. Used in the putting out of the Vitosha 2012 fire.

=== Egypt ===
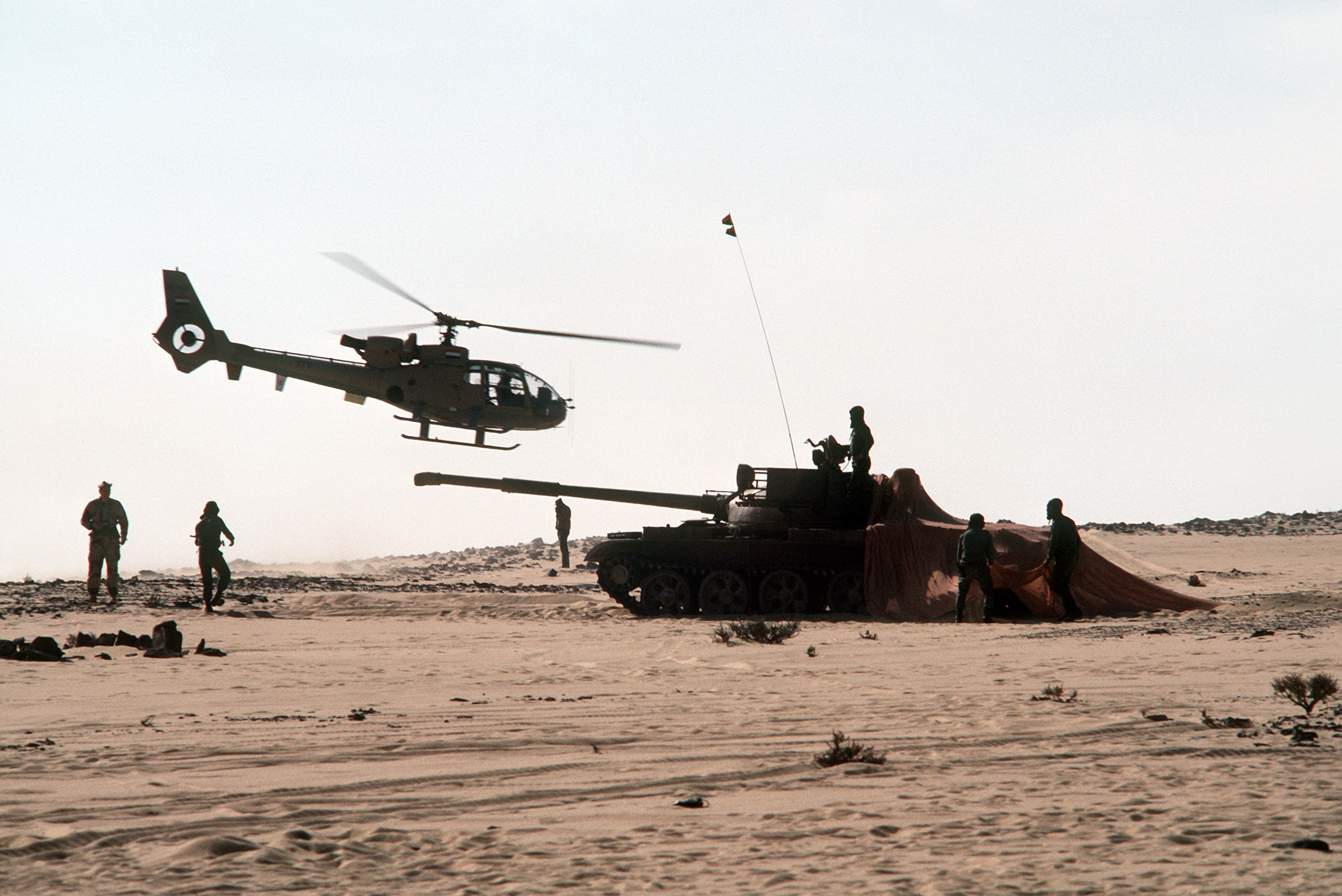
An Egyptian T-62 in 1982. Note the attachment on the turret sides.

- T-62 modernization made by NORICUM. The modernization includes a replacement of the 115 mm tank gun with a 105 mm Royal Ordnance L7 tank gun. The Egyptian Army evaluated the vehicle and incorporated its upgrades in its RO-115 Mark I modernization.
  - RO-115 Mark I: developed in the early 1980s. While retaining the Soviet 115 mm gun, more powerful ammunition allows engaging a target at greater range. Some main guns were replaced with the Royal Ordnance L7 105 mm gun as offered by the Austrian firm NORICUM. Other modifications included a British diesel engine developing 750 hp (559 kW), a two-plane stabiliser, ballistic computer, laser rangefinder in an armoured box over the main armament, a cluster of six smoke grenade launchers on the right side of the turret, a fire control system from BMP-3 IFV and additional armour including reactive armour. The upgrades resulted in an increase of weight to 43 tons.
  - T-62E Mark II: Mid 1990s Egyptian refurbishment and modernization program. The tanks were fitted with a license-built German MTU engine developing 880 hp (656 kW). The tanks are armed with a license-built 105 mm M68 tank gun, an Italian fire control system with ballistics computer, infrared vision device, laser rangefinder, gun stabiliser, additional armour including reactive armour, armoured side skirts, modernised suspension and six smoke grenade launchers on each side of the turret. It has an upgraded NBC (nuclear, biological, and chemical) protection system. The T-62E Mark II carries two Egyptian-made two-round anti-tank missile launchers or two 2-round launchers for 80 mm D-3000 smoke rockets on an encroachment extension, or a box-type launcher holding two Sakr smoke missiles on each side of the turret. The upgrade did not change the weight of the tank, which remained at 45 tons.
  - RO-120 Mark III: T-62 tank upgrade developed in 2004. This upgrade arms the tank with the 120 mm M-393 tank gun developed by FSUE. The gun is 5.30 m long and weighs 2.6 tonnes. It can be elevated or depressed between −7° and +15°. The tank has a new license-built German MTU engine developing 890 hp (664 kW) and additional armour, including reactive armour and armoured side skirts. The upgrades resulted in a weight increase to 46.5 tons. This upgrade was completed by the end of 2008.

=== France ===
- T-62 modernization made by GIAT. The modernization includes a replacement of the 115 mm tank gun with a 120 mm smoothbore tank gun, the same as the one used in the AMX 40 prototype main battle tank. No orders were placed for this unit.

=== Israel ===
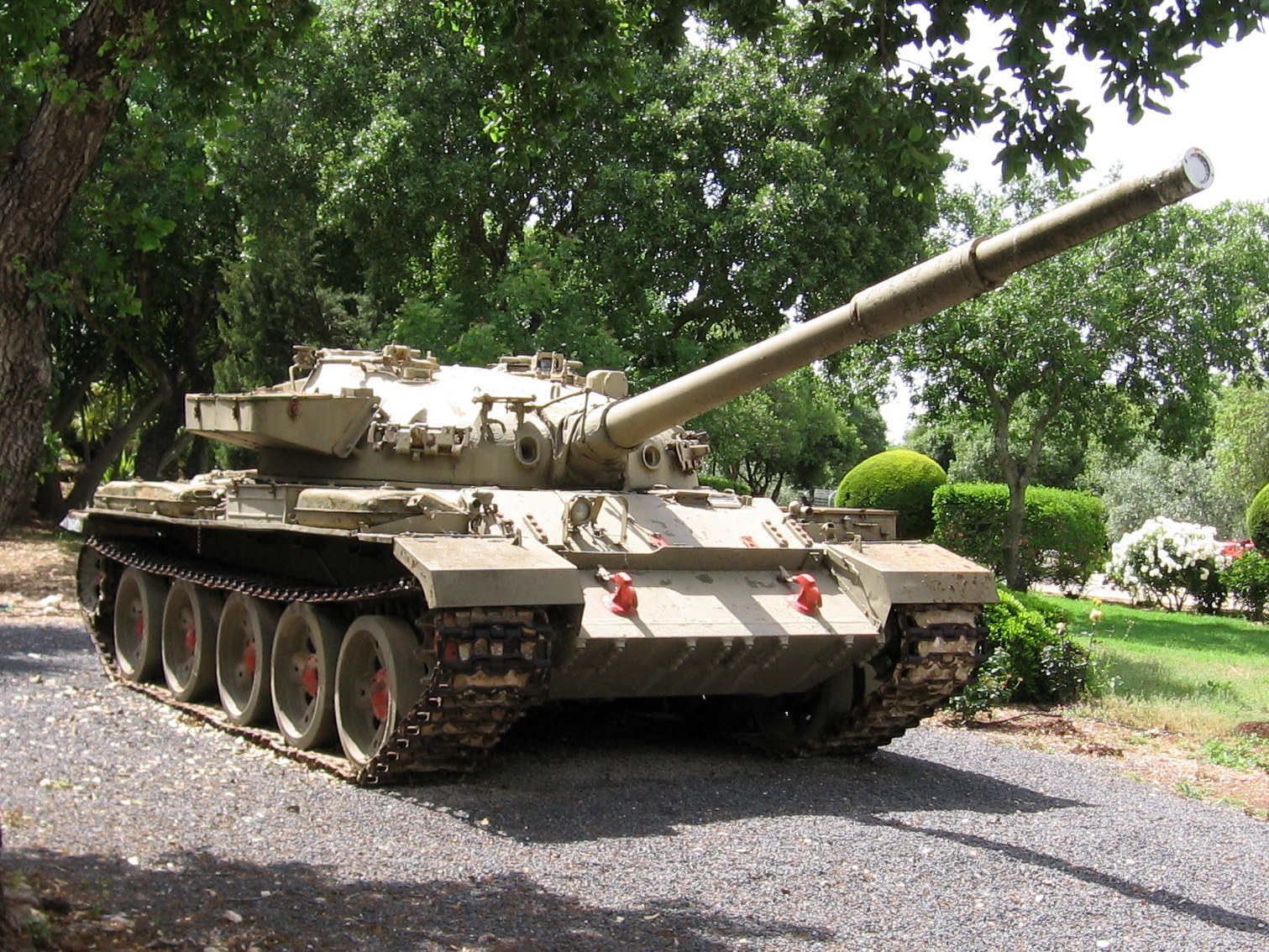
A Tiran-6

Israel captured a small number of Syrian T-62s and made limited adaptions for Israeli service, including US-made radio equipment. The Tiran 6 was not as extensively modified as the Tirans 4 and 5. It is reputed that some Tiran-6s were fitted with "Blazer" reactive armour tiles on the glacis and turret, but that remains to be proven by photographic evidence.

A large open stowage bin was fitted to the turret rear, where stowed gear could, unfortunately, obstruct the hatch for the automatic cartridge case ejection system, with a lidded bin on the right of the turret. These bins were similar to those fitted on Tirans 4 and 5. The original 115 mm gun was retained, making IDF dependent on captured ammunition.

The commander's 12.7 mm DShK 1938/46 antiaircraft heavy machine gun was replaced by an M1919 Browning 7.62mm machine gun, with a mount for a second Browning on the loader's hatch. An M2 Browning 12.7mm machine gun could be mounted on the mantlet of the main gun as a ranging gun. Tiran 6 was apparently only deployed operationally during the 1982 Lebanon War and was withdrawn from service shortly afterwards as the arrival of further stocks of M60 and M60A1 from the US made it unnecessary to use the T-62.

=== North Korea ===
- Ch'ŏnma-ho I (Ga) – This is a lighter and thinner armoured copy of the T-62. Based on general trends and photography of armed forces parades, it is clear that North Korea has made considerable modifications to the basic Soviet and Chinese designs in its own production.
- Ch'ŏnma-ho II – designation for an imported T-62.
- Ch'ŏnma-ho III – A simple progressive upgrade of the Ch’onma-ho 2, with a thermal sleeve for the main gun and armoured track skirts added. It is possible, but considered unlikely, that lugs for ERA have been added since its introduction; if they are present, they would be most likely found on the glacis and turret sides. A night vision upgrade.
- Ch'ŏnma-ho IV – Greatly upgraded armour protection, including composite armour on the glacis and turret front, and appliqué or thickened armour elsewhere. Even the appliqué and/or thickened armour appears to be more advanced than earlier models, and does not appear to have gained a huge amount of weight. A ballistic computer was added to the fire control suite, and the fire control suite has been integrated into a complete system rather than being a patchwork of upgrades. Gun stabilization has been improved. Radios are improved, and the suspension beefed up. The new engine is a 750-horsepower model which can lay a thick, oily smoke screen by injecting diesel fuel into its exhaust. Lugs for ERA (similar to the Russian Kontakt-3 ERA) were added to turret sides, and lugs on the armoured track skirts and on the glacis. Lugs for a relatively small amount of ERA bricks on the turret front; the ERA on the turret front would only protect 40% of hits to the turret front. On side of the turret, clusters of four smoke grenade launchers; at the rear of the turret another cluster of four smoke grenade launchers, firing backwards instead of forward.
- Ch'ŏnma-ho V – Armour upgrades derived partially from the T-90S and T-72S, as well as a better ballistic computer and the addition of the aforementioned thermal imagers. Upgraded main gun – a copy of the 2A46 125 mm gun. Some sources also claim an autoloader was installed; however, this statement is questionable since the Pokpung'ho (another T-62-based tank with the 2A46 125 mm gun) was confirmed to have a manual loader. The fire control system was replaced with one matching the new main gun, and the spent shell ejection system was dispensed with. Used wider tracks.

=== Russia ===
- T-62M "Obr. 2021" – Upgraded T-62M. Kontakt-1 ERA bricks and slat armour were added to the sides. A more modern 1PN96MT-02 gunner's sight replaced the older TPN-1 sights.
- T-62MV "Obr. 2022" – Upgraded T-62MV. Uses the 1PN96MT-02 gunner's sight. Used in the Russian invasion of Ukraine.

=== Ukraine ===
- T-55AGM – Ukrainian T-54/T-55 modernization which can also be applied to T-62s.
- T-62AG – Upgraded by Kharkiv Morozov Machine Building Design Bureau. It is fitted with the 5TDF 700 hp diesel engine, a 125 mm KBA-101 tank gun, new fire control equipment and enhanced armour protection. The combat weight is 39.5 tonnes. The crew still consists of 4 men because there is no automatic loader. The upgrade package is aimed at the export market.

Kharkiv Morozov Machine Building Design Bureau is offering three T-62 conversions:

- T-62 based heavy infantry fighting vehicle.
- T-62 based armoured recovery vehicle.
- T-62 based armoured bridge layer.

Ukrainian volunteers installed a BMP-2 turret onto a captured T-62M, armour plates and Explosive Reactive Armour were bolted on the hull and turret, the program is meant to create a Heavy Infantry Fighting Vehicle.

=== United States ===
- T-62 – This version is modified in a number of ways including the replacement of the original diesel engine with a Caterpillar diesel engine and fitting of US radios and antennae mounts. T-62 tanks modified in such a way were used by the US Army for opposing forces training.

== Operators ==
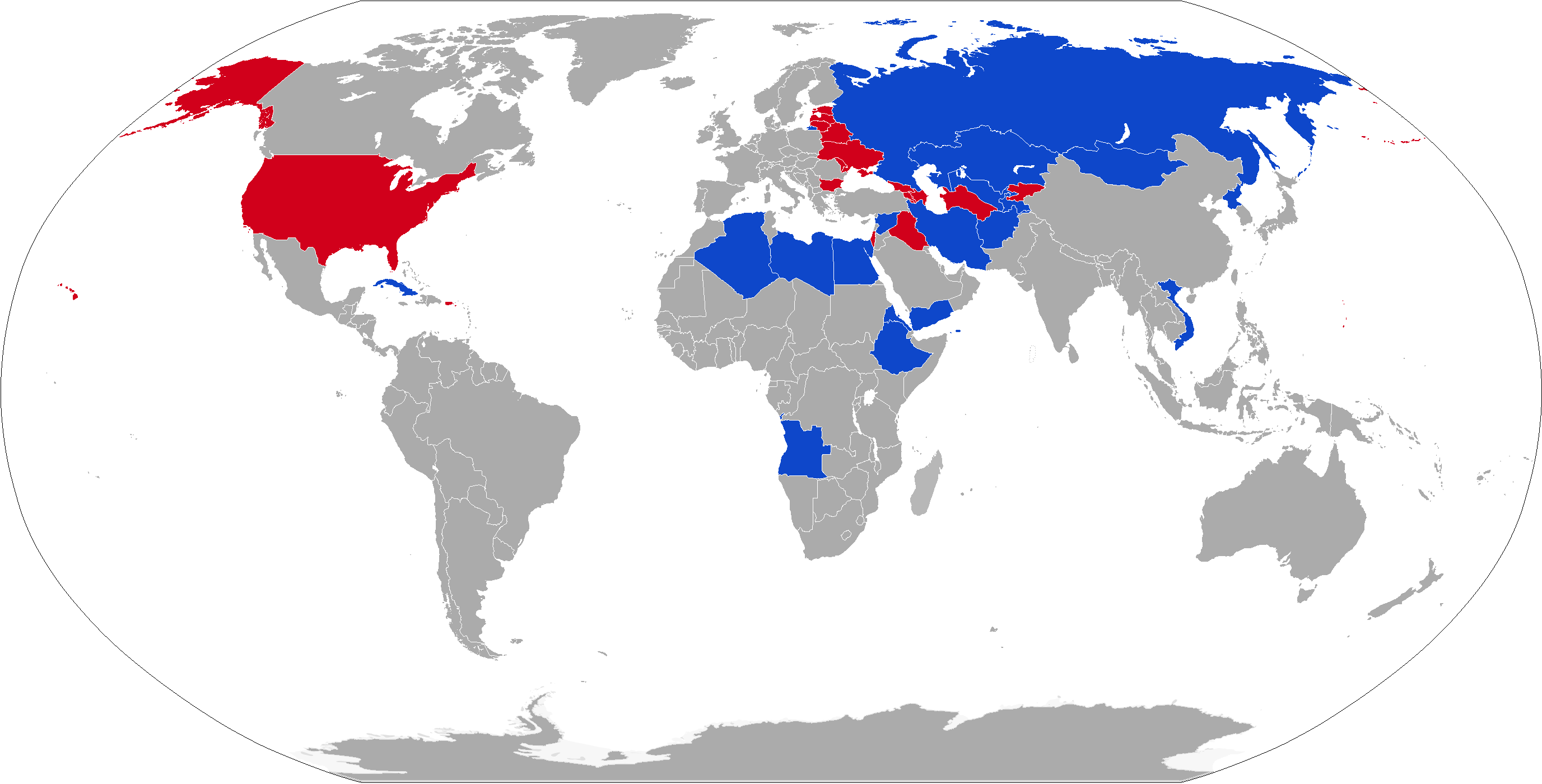
Operators Current Former

=== Current operators ===
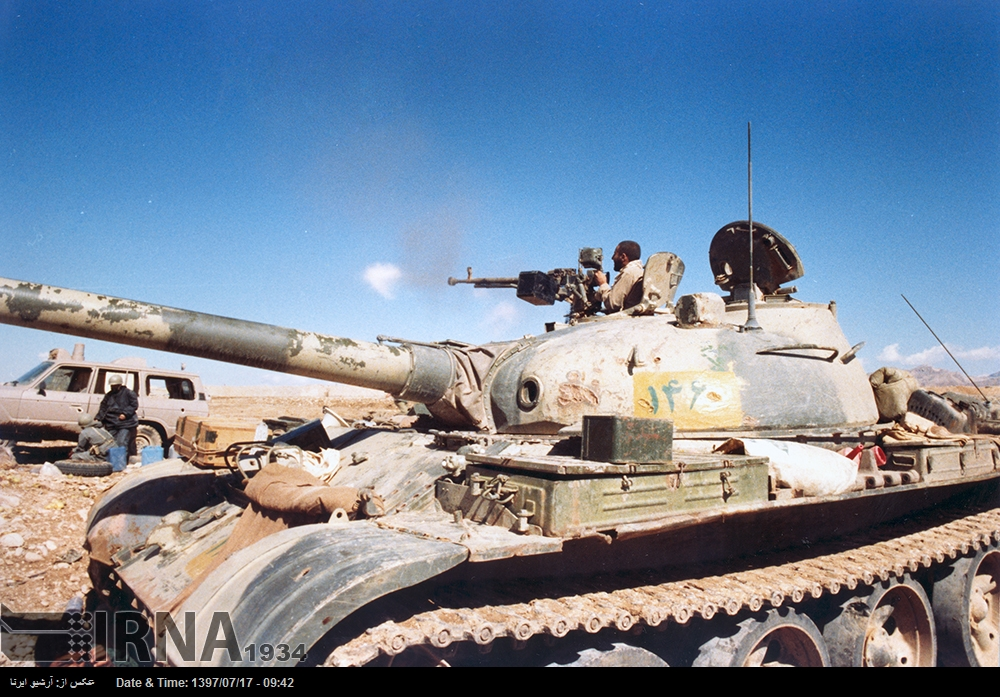
Iranian T-62, 1984

- Afghanistan – 100 were ordered in 1973 from the Soviet Union and delivered between 1975 and 1976. 155 were ordered in 1979 from the Soviet Union and delivered between 1979 and 1991 (the vehicles were probably previously in Soviet service). 34 T-62Ms in service as of 2025
- Algeria – 330 delivered between 1977 and 1979. 290 in service as of 2023
- Angola – 175 were ordered in 1980 from the Soviet Union and delivered between 1981 and 1985 (the vehicles were previously in Soviet service). 35 were ordered in 1987 from the Soviet Union and delivered in 1987. 100 were ordered in 1987 from the Soviet Union and delivered between 1987 and 1988 (the vehicles were previously in Soviet service). 24 were ordered in 1993 from Bulgaria and delivered in 1993 (the vehicles were previously in Bulgarian service). 30 were ordered in 1993 from Russia and delivered between 1993 and 1994 (the vehicles were previously in Soviet and then Russian service; some could be T-55s). 50 in service as of 2023
- Cuba – 200 were ordered in 1976 from the Soviet Union and delivered between 1976 and 1983 (the vehicles were previously in Soviet service). 200 were ordered in 1984 from the Soviet Union and delivered between 1984 and 1988. 400 in service in 2005. Operates an unknown number of T-62s as of 2023. They are modernised to the T-62M standard
- Egypt – 200 in service and 300 in storage as of 2025. 750 were ordered in 1971 from the Soviet Union and delivered between 1972 and 1975.
- Ethiopia – 20 were ordered in 1977 from the Soviet Union and delivered in 1977 (the vehicles were previously in Soviet service). 50 were ordered in 1980 from the Soviet Union and delivered in 1980 (the vehicles were previously in Soviet service). 70 in service as of 2005. Unknown number in service as of 2023
- Iran – 65 were ordered in 1981 from Libya and received in 1981 as aid (the vehicles were previously in Libyan service). 100 were ordered in 1982 from Syria and delivered in 1982 (the vehicles were previously in Syrian service). Iran ordered 150 Ch'ŏnma-hos in 1981 from North Korea and they were delivered between 1982 and 1985. At least 75 in service as of 2023
- Kurdistan Region – 186 Peshmerga Forces.
- Libya – 150 were ordered in 1973 from the Soviet Union and delivered in 1974. 400 were ordered in 1976 from the Soviet Union and delivered between 1976 and 1978. 250 were ordered in 1978 from the Soviet Union and delivered in 1978. At the peak there were approximately 900 T-62s in service. Before the fall of the Gaddafi regime, 100 were in service and 70 were stored. In 2020, T-62Ms and T-62MVs were delivered by Russia to the Libyan National Army.
- North Korea – 350 were ordered in 1970 from the Soviet Union and delivered between 1971 and 1975. 150 ordered in 1974 from the Soviet Union were delivered between 1976 and 1978. North Korea also produced more than 1,200 Ch'ŏnma-hos. 1,800 T-62s and Ch'ŏnma-hos in 2005. Unknown number of T-62 and Ch'ŏnma-hos in service as of 2023
- Russia – 600 T-62M/MV in active service, 822 T-62 in store. At least 2,000 were inherited from the Soviet Union. 761 were in active service in 1995. 191 were in active service and 1,929 in storage as of 2000. During 2013 all the tanks of the model and its modifications were allegedly scrapped – later it was found this was not true, as Russia reactivated numerous T-62s to resupply the Syrian Army. In 2022, Russia sent T-62 tanks to reinforce the Southern Ukraine offensive in Zaporizhzhia Oblast during the 2022 Russian Invasion of Ukraine; reportedly up to 600 T-62s were taken out of long-term storage.
- Sahrawi Republic − Around 30 supplied by Libya. Status uncertain
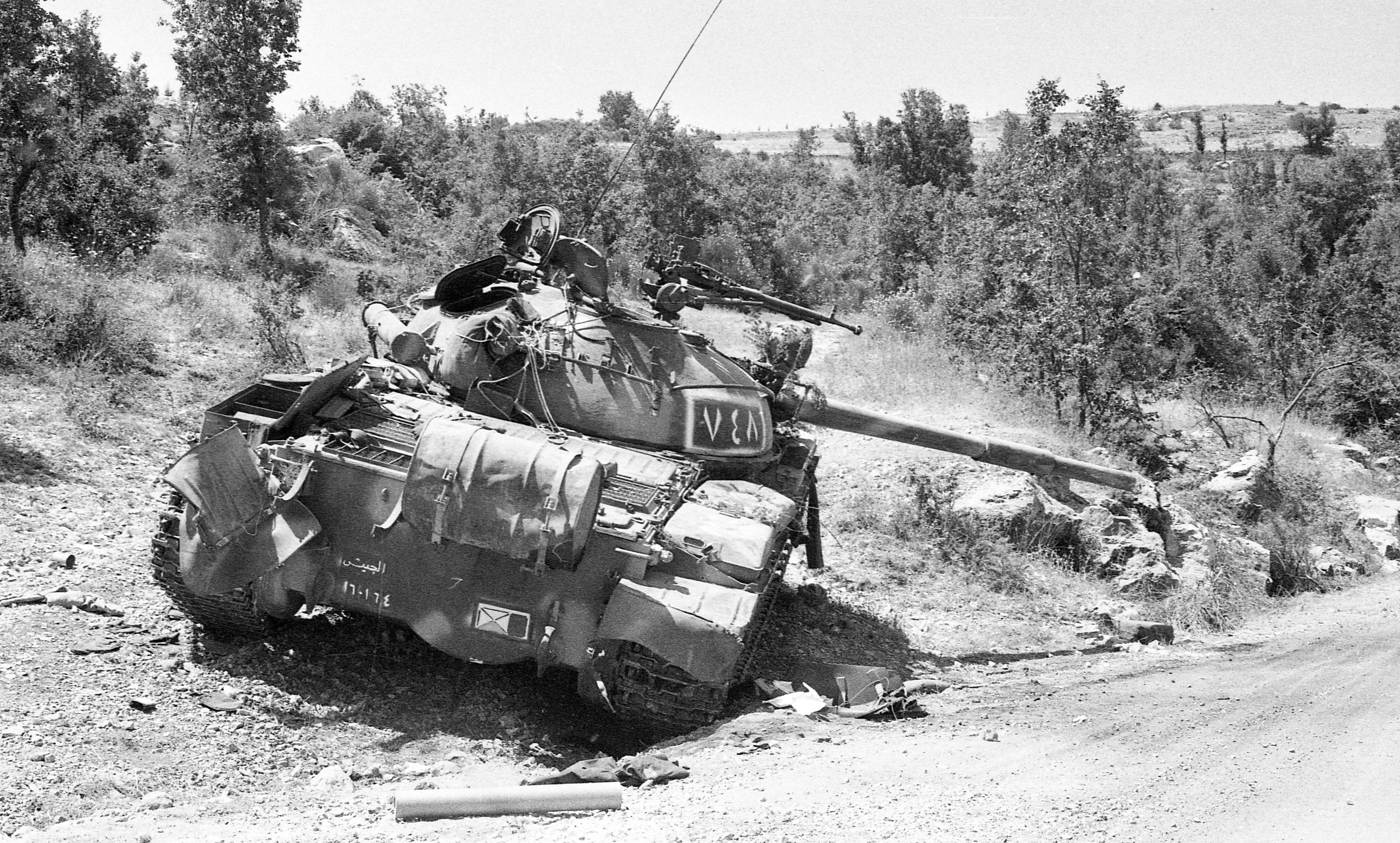
- Syrian T-62 disabled by Israeli forces in Lebanon, 1982
  Syria – 500 were ordered in 1973 from the Soviet Union and delivered between 1973 and 1974. 200 ordered in 1978 from Libya were delivered in 1979 as aid. 300 were ordered in 1982 from the Soviet Union and delivered between 1982 and 1984 (the vehicles were previously in Soviet service). 1,000 T-62s were in service as of 2005. In 2018, the Russian Federation reactivated and field-tested T-62M and T-62MV tanks from war stores and transported them to Syria. T-62A, T-62 obr. 1972, T-62 obr. 1975, T-62K, T-62M, and T-62MV as of 2023
- (Syria) Free Syrian Army – Limited use of captured government tanks
- People's Defense Units (YPG)
- Tajikistan – 7 T-62, T-62AV, and T-62AM as of 2023
- Ukraine – 400 inherited from the Soviet Union. 85 in service in 1995, 1 in 1996, none in 2000. As of December 2024, Ukraine has captured 45 units of T-62 Obr.1967, T-62M and T-62MV from Russian army in the Russo-Ukrainian war. Several of these captured T-62s were modified to serve as armoured recovery vehicles or infantry fighting vehicles.
- Uzbekistan – 170 as of 2023
- Vietnam – 70 as of 2023
- Yemen – 200 in 2005. Unknown number as of 2023

=== Former operators ===
- Belarus – 170 were in service in 1995
- Bulgaria – 250 were ordered in 1969 from the Soviet Union and delivered between 1970 and 1974. 150 T-62M received in 1988 from the Soviet Union, they were soon withdrawn from service and converted into ARVs under the designation TV-62M, these were used as late as 2005
- Chechen Republic of Ichkeria
- Eritrea – Received a number from Ethiopia.
- Iraq – 100 were ordered in 1973 from the Soviet Union and delivered between 1974 and 1975. 600 ordered in 1976 from the Soviet Union were delivered between 1977 and 1979. 2,150 were ordered in 1982 from the Soviet Union and delivered between 1982 and 1989 (the vehicles were probably previously in Soviet service). 1,000 in service in 1989. 500 were estimated to be in service prior to the 2003 invasion of Iraq
- Islamic State
- Israel – Between 70 and 100 in reserve or training vehicles as of 2005
- Kazakhstan − 280 as of 2005
- Mongolia – 100 were ordered in 1973 from the Soviet Union and delivered between 1973 and 1975
- Soviet Union – More than 20,000 were produced between July 1961 and 1975. 8,500 in service in 1991. The tanks were passed on to successor states.
- Tigray Defense Forces − Surrendered to the Ethiopian forces in the aftermath of the Tigray War
- United States − Used by OPFOR
- North Yemen – 16 ordered in 1979 from the Soviet Union were delivered in 1980 (the vehicles were previously in Soviet service).
- South Yemen – 50 were ordered from the Soviet Union in 1979 and received in 1979 as aid. Another 100 were ordered in 1980 from the Soviet Union and delivered between 1981 and 1982. 120 more ordered in 1986 from the Soviet Union were delivered in 1986. All the vehicles of the last batch were previously in Soviet service.
- Southern Yemeni separatists – 56 were ordered in 1994 from Bulgaria and delivered in 1994, and saw service in the Yemeni Civil War of 1994 (the vehicles were previously in Bulgarian service; they were bought for $20 million).

=== Evaluation-only operators ===
- China – A Soviet T-62 was captured by the PLA during the 1969 Sino-Soviet border clash along the Ussuri river. It was used for study only.
- Czechoslovakia – Evaluated the tank, but did not accept it.

== Combat history ==
- 1969: Sino-Soviet border conflict (Soviet Union)
- 1973: Yom Kippur War (Egypt and Syria)
- 1961–1991: Iraqi–Kurdish conflict (Iraq and Peshmerga)
- 1961–1991: Eritrean War of Independence (Ethiopia and EPLF)
- 1974–1991: Ethiopian Civil War (Ethiopia, EPLF and TPLF)
- 1975–1991: Western Sahara War (Polisario)
- 1975–2002: Angolan Civil War (Angola, Cuba and UNITA)
- 1977–1978: Ogaden War (Cuba and Ethiopia)
- 1978–1987: Chadian–Libyan conflict (Libya)
  - 1986–1987: Toyota War
- 1979–1989: Soviet–Afghan War (Soviet Union and Afghanistan)
- 1979–1989: Cambodian–Vietnamese War
- 1980–1988: Iran–Iraq War (Iran and Iraq)
- 1982–1983: Lebanese Civil War, Phase III
- 1988–1993: Georgian Civil War
  - 1991–1992: War in South Ossetia
  - 1992–1993: War in Abkhazia
- 1990–1991: Gulf War (Iraq)
- 1992–1997: Tajikistani Civil War (Tajikistan)
- 1994: Yemeni Civil War (1994) (Yemen and Southern separatist forces)
- 1994–1996: First Chechen War (Russia)
- 1998–2000: Eritrean–Ethiopian War (Eritrea and Ethiopia)
- 1999–2009: Second Chechen War (Russia)
- 2001–2021: War in Afghanistan (Afghan government and Taliban)
- 2003–2011: Iraq War
  - 2003: Invasion of Iraq (Iraq)
- 2008: Russo-Georgian War (Russia)
- 2011: First Libyan Civil War (Gaddafi Government and anti-Gaddafi forces)
- 2011–2024: Syrian Civil War (Syrian regime forces, ISIL, and rebels)
- 2014–2020: Second Libyan Civil War (Libyan National Army and Government of National Accord)
- 2014–present: Yemeni Civil War (2014–present) (Hadi-government forces and Houthis)
- 2020–2022: Tigray War (Ethiopian government forces and Tigray Defense Forces)
- 2022–present: Russo-Ukrainian War (Russian and Ukrainian forces)

== See also ==
- List of tanks
- List of Soviet tanks
- Chonma-ho
- Type 69 tank

=== Tanks of comparable role, performance and era ===
- AMX-30 – French main battle tank
- Centurion Mk. 6 - British main battle tank
- Leopard 1 – German main battle tank
- M60 Patton – US main battle tank
- Stridsvagn 103 – Swedish main battle tank
- Type 74 – Japanese main battle tank
- Panzer 61 - Swiss main battle tank

== Bibliography ==
- Baryatinskiy, Mikhail (2013). Все современные танки. Коллекционное издание [All Modern Tanks: Collection Edition] (in Russian). Moscow: Eksmo, Yauza. ISBN 978-5-699-64203-8.
- Foss, Christopher F. (1987). Jane's AFV Recognition Handbook. London: Jane's. pp. 70–71. ISBN 0-7106-0432-7.
- Glantz, Colonel David M. (2012). Soviet Military Operational Art: In Pursuit of Deep Battle. Routledge. ISBN 978-1-136-28830-2.
- Perrett, Bryan (1987). Soviet Armour Since 1945. London: Blandford Press. ISBN 0-7137-1735-1.
- Zaloga, Steven J. (2009). T-62 Main Battle Tank 1965–2005. NVG 158. illustrated by Tony Bryan. Osprey Publishing.
- "The Soviet Main Battle Tank Capabilities and Limitations". TRADOC Bulletin (10). US Army Training and Doctrine Command. February 1979.
- International Institute for Strategic Studies (1995). The Military Balance 1995-1996. Oxford University Press. ISBN 978-0-19-828055-2.
- International Institute for Strategic Studies (February 2016). The Military Balance 2016. Vol. 116. Routledge. ISBN 978-1-85743-835-2.
- International Institute for Strategic Studies (15 February 2023). The Military Balance 2023. Taylor & Francis. ISBN 978-1-000-91070-4.
