= T-72 =

Soviet/Russian main battle tank

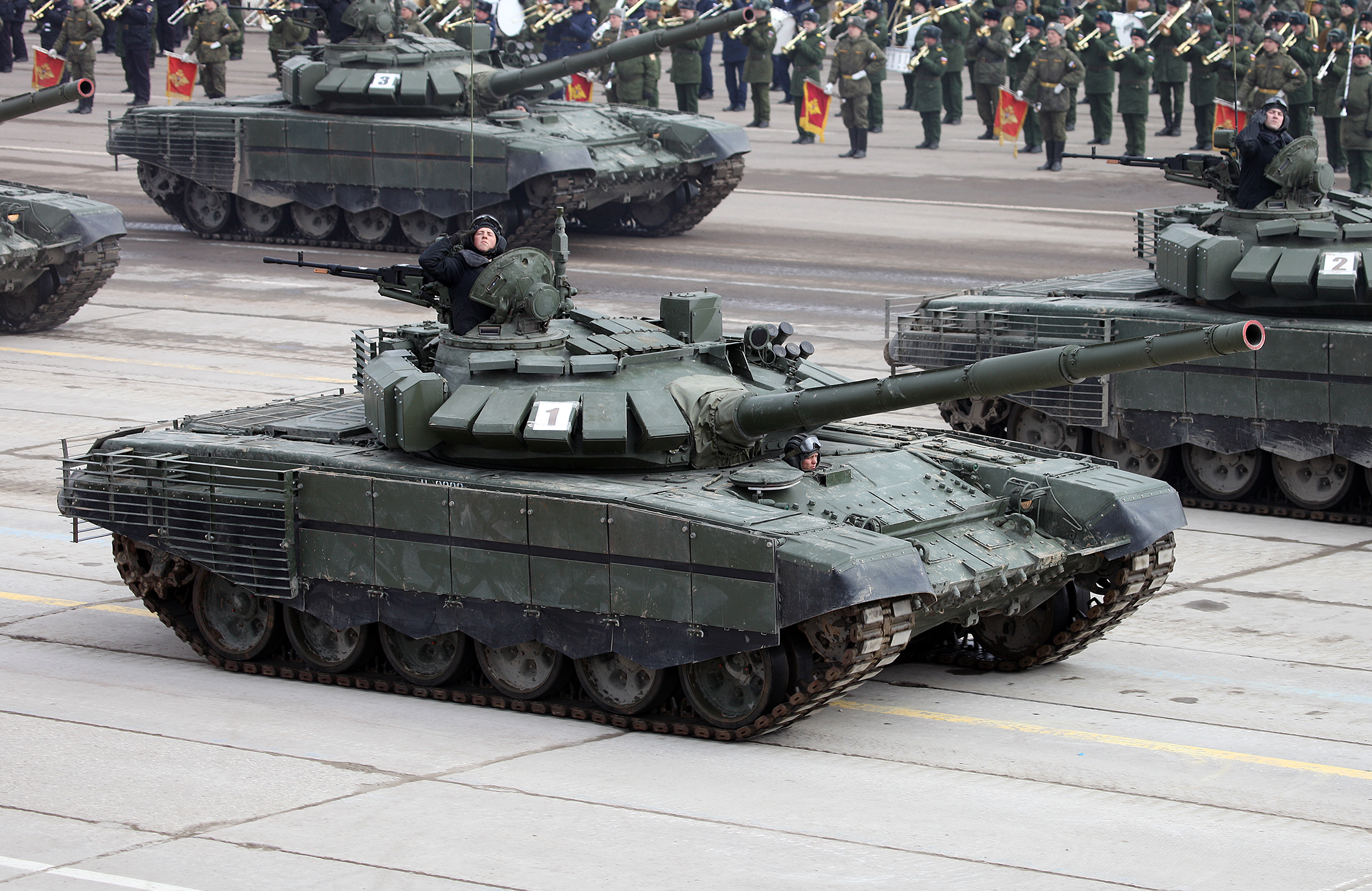
- T-72B3M, the latest production version, in Alabino during rehearsals for the 2017 Moscow Victory Day Parade.
- Type: Main battle tank
- Place of origin: Soviet Union

Service history
- In service: 1969–present
- Used by: See Operators
- Wars: List: Iran–Iraq War; 1982 Lebanon War; 1982 Ethiopian–Somali Border War; Sri Lankan Civil War; First Nagorno-Karabakh War; Gulf War; 1991 Iraqi uprisings; Georgian Civil War; Civil war in Tajikistan; Sierra Leone Civil War; Yugoslav Wars; Algerian Civil War; Rwandan Civil War; First Chechen War; Kargil War; Second Chechen War; 2003 invasion of Iraq; Russo-Georgian War; First Libyan Civil War; Syrian Civil War; South Sudanese Civil War; War in Iraq (2013–2017); Second Libyan Civil War; Boko Haram insurgency; 2016 Nagorno-Karabakh clashes; 2020 Nagorno-Karabakh war; Tigray War; Russo-Ukraine War; 2023 Sudan conflict

Production history
- Designer: Leonid Kartsev-Valeri Venediktov
- Designed: 1967–1972
- Manufacturer: Uralvagonzavod, Heavy Vehicles Factory
- Unit cost: US$0.5–1.2 million in 1994–1996, US$1–2 million (30,962,000–61,924,000 rubles) in 2009, US$0.5 million in 2011
- Produced: 1973–present
- No. built: approx. 25,000

Specifications (T-72A)
- Mass: 41.0 tonnes (45.2 short tons) (T-72 Ural); 41.5 tonnes (45.7 short tons) (T-72A); 44.5 tonnes (49.1 short tons) (T-72B)
- Length: 9.73 m (31 ft 11 in) gun forward; 6.67 to 6.86 m (21 ft 11 in to 22 ft 6 in) hull
- Width: 3.40 to 3.59 m (11 ft 2 in to 11 ft 9 in)
- Height: 2.23 m (7 ft 4 in)
- Crew: 3 (commander, gunner, driver)
- Armour: Steel and composite armour with ERA
- Main armament: 125 mm 2A26M2/2A46/2A46M/2A46M-5 smoothbore gun
- Secondary armament: 7.62 mm PKT coax. machine gun; 12.7 mm NSVT
- Engine: V12 diesel; V-46-4 (T-72 Ural), V-46-6 (T-72A), V-84-1 (T-72B), V-92S2F (T-72B3 & T-72B3M); 780 hp (580 kW) (V-46-4/V-46-6); 840 hp (630 kW) (V-84-1); 1,130 hp (840 kW) (V-92S2F)
- Power/weight: 19.0 hp/tonne (T-72 Ural), 18.8 hp/tonne (T-72 A/B)
- Transmission: Synchromesh, hydraulically assisted, with 7 forward and 1 reverse gears
- Suspension: Torsion bar
- Ground clearance: 0.49 m (19 in)
- Fuel capacity: 1,200 L (320 U.S. gal; 260 imp gal)
- Operational range: 500 km (310 mi), 650 to 700 km (400 to 430 mi) with fuel drums
- Maximum speed: 60 km/h (37 mph); 4 km/h (2.5 mph) (reverse)

The T-72 is a family of Soviet main battle tanks that entered production in 1973. The T-72, made by Uralvagonzavod, was a development based on the T-64 using thought and design of the previous Object 167M. About 25,000 T-72 tanks have been built, and refurbishment has enabled many to remain in service for decades. It has been widely exported and has seen service in 40 countries and in numerous conflicts. The Russian T-90 introduced in 1992 and the Chinese Type 99 are further developments of the T-72. Production and development of various modernized T-72 models continues today.

== Development ==
=== Development from the T-64 ===
The T-72 was a product of a rivalry between two design teams: Morozov KB led by Alexander Morozov in Kharkiv and Uralvagon KB was led by Leonid Kartsev in Nizhny Tagil.

To improve on the T-62, two designs based on the tank were tested in 1964: Nizhny Tagil's Object 167 (T-62B) and Kharkiv's Object 434.

Ob. 434 was a technically ambitious prototype. Under the direction of Morozov in Kharkiv, a new design emerged with the hull reduced to the minimum size possible. To do this, the crew was reduced to three soldiers, removing the loader by introducing an automated loading system.

Ob. 167 was designed based on an Object 140 rebuilt by Kartsev and Valeri Venediktov. Ob. 167 was more advanced than Kartsev's Ob. 165 and Ob. 166, and was also Kartsev's favored model. In October 1961, when asked to ready Ob. 166 for production, Kartsev disagreed and instead offered to prepare the Ob. 167. This suggestion was rejected, and the Ob. 166 and Ob. 165 were readied as the T-62 and T-62A respectively. Unlike the Kharkiv tank, it eschewed the state-of-the-art prototypes and used the turret from the T-62, and a manual loader. In 1964, the tank underwent comparative testing with the Ob. 434, in which the former proved its superiority to both the T-62 and T-55. Ob. 167 was favored by Uralvagonzavod director I.V. Okunev and Soviet Premier Nikita Khrushchev, who believed the tank was more affordable. Deputy Chairman of the Council of Ministers of the Soviet Union Dmitry Ustinov, believed the parallel development of Ob. 167 jeopardized the future of the Kharkiv tank. In December 1962, the Council of Ministers of the Soviet Union ordered Ob. 432 (later serialized as the T-64) into production, dooming Kartsev's tank.

Kartsev continued to work on the Object 167. Object 167 incorporated an autoloader. This model too was rejected in May 1964.

Problems with the early production run were evident from the start, but a strong lobby formed around Morozov who advocated for Ob. 434 in Moscow, preventing rival developments and ideas from being discussed. Ob. 434 was accepted into Soviet Army service in May 1968 as the T-64A.

The T-64's smaller design presented a problem when selecting a suitable engine. The chosen 700 hp 5TDF engine was unreliable, difficult to repair, and had a guaranteed lifespan similar to World War II designs.

=== Object 172 ===
In 1967, the Uralvagonzavod formed "Section 520", which was to prepare the serial production of the T-64 for 1970. Because of the time-consuming construction of the 5TDF engines, which took about twice as long as the contemporary V-45, the Malyshev Factory in Kharkiv could not provide a sufficient number of 5TDF engines for all Soviet tank factories. The Military-Industrial Commission (VPK) authorized work on two alternative engines for a wartime T-64, a so-called "mobilization model" that could be produced more quickly and at half the cost. Obj. 219 (which became the T-80, with a GTD-1000T gas-turbine) was designed in Leningrad. Ob. 439 with a diesel V-45 engine was designed by Uralvagon KB at Uralvagonzavod in Nizhny Tagil.

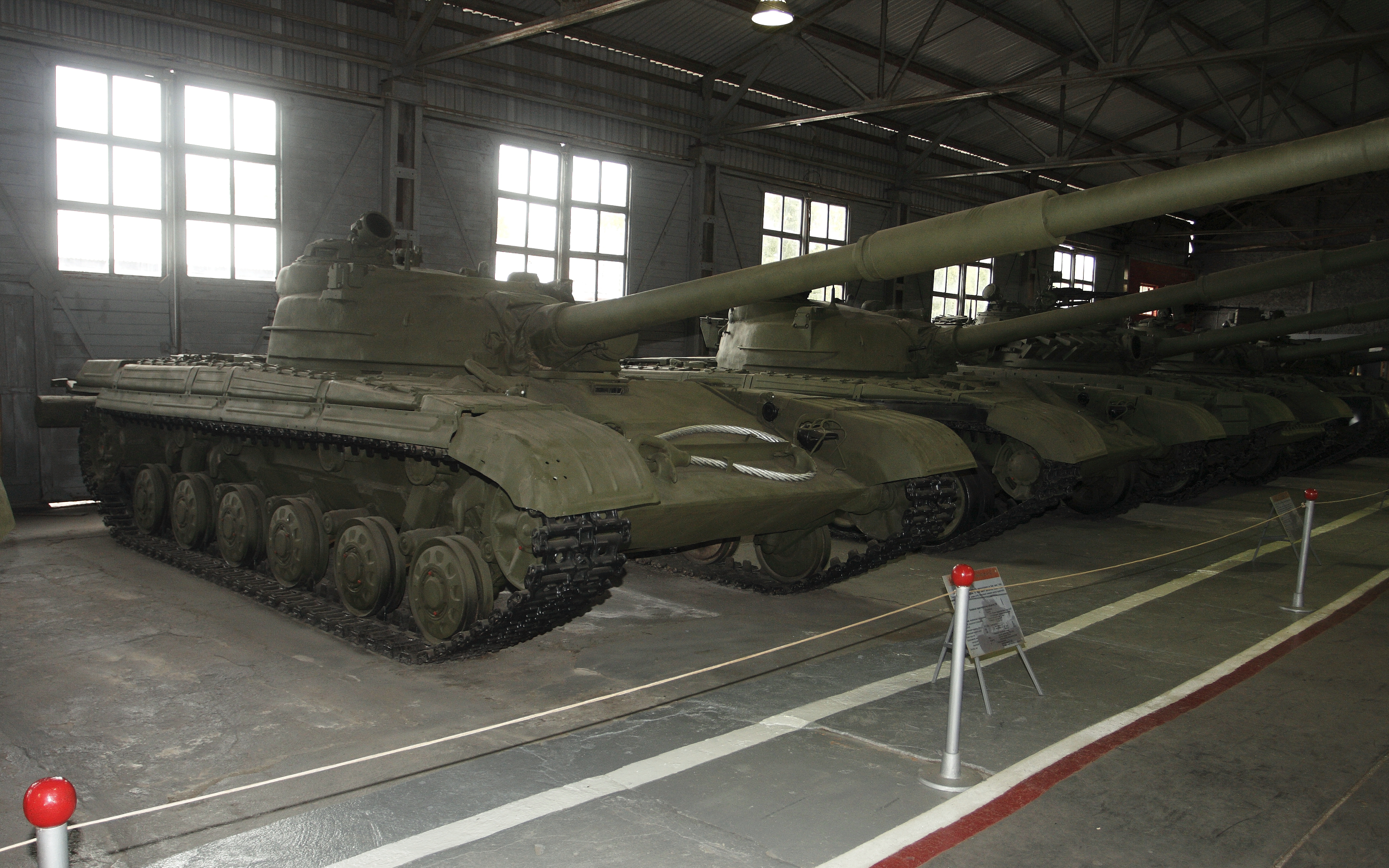
Object 172 at the Kubinka Tank Museum

GABTU sent a T-64A prototype with a team to Uralvagonzavod. Kartsev was to lead this team.

Kartsev was unsatisfied with the innovations of the T-64, and began instead a more comprehensive project to redesign the tank. Kartsev melded what he believed were the best aspects of the T-64A, Object 167, and an upgunned T-62.

During development the tank was code-named "Ural" after the Ural mountain region. Uralvagonzavod produced the first prototype with a T-62 turret, D-81 125-mm gun and V-45 engine in January 1968. Ob. 439 differed so greatly from the T-64 that it was redesignated as "Object 172".

Kartsev's defiance angered GABTU, which initially reprimanded him for his insubordination. However, after the tank proved indeed to possess potential as a less costly alternative to the T-64, Kartsev was allowed to continue work on his design. Politically motivated opposition continued to beset the tank throughout its development. Vagonka tank plant manager I.F. Krutyakov sought to subordinate Uralvagonzavod under Josef Kotin. Kartsev skillfully beat back this play for power, embarrassing Krutyakov in the process. Kartsev retired in August 1969, and was succeeded by Venediktov.

The team soon found out that the more powerful V-45 engine put a lot of stress on the T-64 hull, so that after some time cracks started to materialize. A more stable solution was sought.

Finally, an idea from 1960 was used, when a modification of the T-62 had been discussed: In 1961, two prototypes of "Object 167" had been built by Uralvagonzavod to test a stronger hull and running gear combination for that tank. Under influence from Kharkiv, the idea had been turned down by Moscow. But this construction, with its big, rubbercoated roadwheels now formed the basis for the mobilisation model of the T-64.

Additional changes were made to the automatic loading system, which also was taken from an earlier project, originally intended for a T-62 upgrade. The 125-mm ammunition, consisting of a separate projectile and a propellant charge, was now stored horizontally on two levels, not vertically on one level as in the T-64. It was said to be more reliable than the T-64 autoloader. In 1964, two 125-mm guns of the D-81 type had been used to evaluate their installation into the T-62, so the Ural plant was ready to adopt the 125 mm calibre for the T-64A as well.

Venediktov's team later replaced the T-64-style suspension with the Obj. 167's suspension. The tank was trialed in Kubinka in 1968, and Central Asia in 1969. After intensive comparative testing with the T-64A, Object 172 was re-engineered in 1970 to deal with some minor problems. Further trials took place in Transbaikal in 1971.

=== T-72 ===
Being only a mobilisation model, serial production of Object 172 was not possible in peacetime. However, by 1971, even Ustinov was growing tired of problems with the T-64. In an unclear political process decree number 326-113 was issued, which allowed the production of Object 172 in the Soviet Union from 1 January 1972, and freed Uralvagonzavod from the T-64A production.

An initial production run began in 1972 at Nizhni Tagil. These were trialed in the Soviet Army. A final trial batch was built as "Object 172M" and tested in 1973 and accepted into service as the "T-72" in 1974.

Uralvagon KB continued to iterate on the T-72 in a series of block improvements. Obj. 172M-1 introduced ceramic/steel laminate turret armour. The coincidence rangefinder was replaced with a laser rangefinder. Obj. 172M-1 was designated as the T-72A when it entered production in 1979. Turret armour was greatly improved with Obj. 184. A more powerful V-84 engine was introduced to offset the increased weight. Obj. 184 entered service in 1985 as the T-72B.

At least some technical documentation on the T-72 is known to have been passed to the CIA by the Polish Colonel Ryszard Kukliński between 1971 and 1982.

== Production history ==
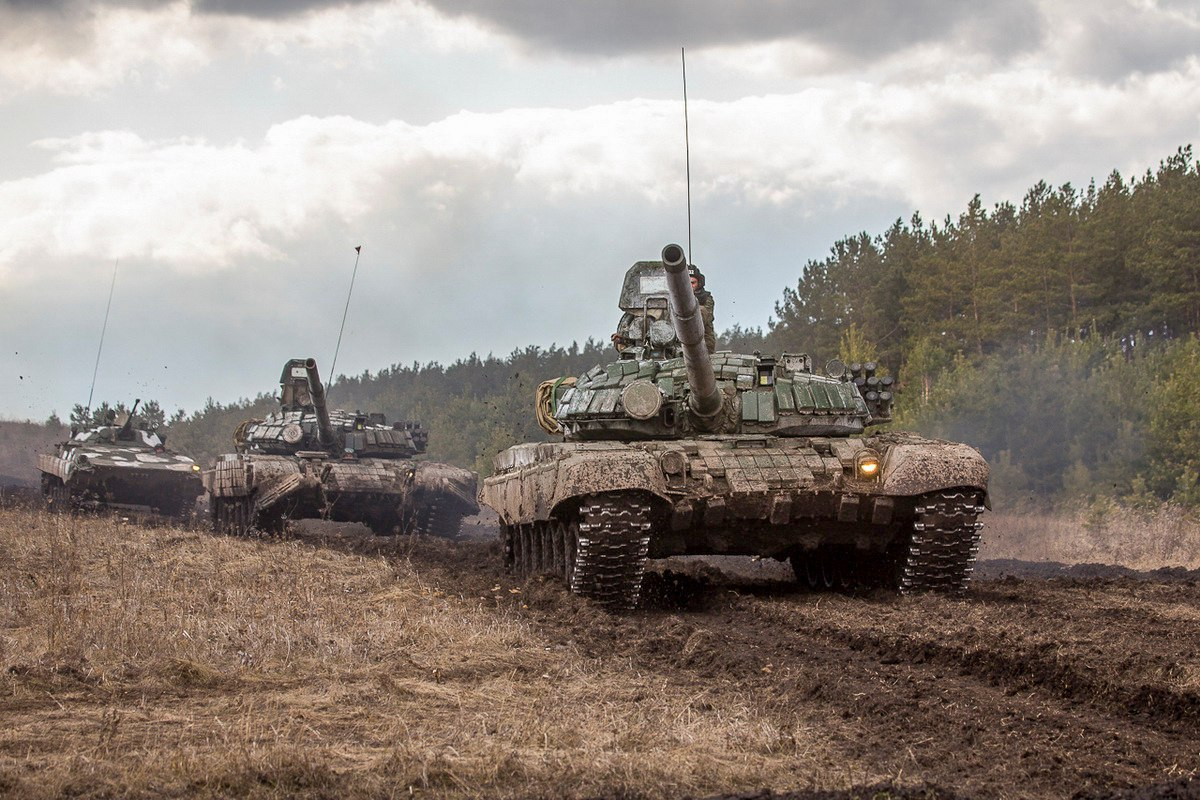
Two T-72B tanks at the Chebarkul training ground, Russia, April 2017

The first series production of T-72 Object 172M began in July at UKBM in Nizhny Tagil. However, due to difficulties in getting the factory organised for the change in production from T-64 to T-72, only 30 completed tanks were delivered in 1973. Troubles continued in 1974 where out of a state production quota of 440 only 220 were officially declared, with the actual number of completed tanks being close to 150. As a result, substantial investment in tooling was undertaken. Following major investment in factory modernisation and tooling, the plant later achieved full-scale production and continued manufacturing T-72 variants until 1992.

The T-72 was the most common tank used by the Warsaw Pact from the 1970s until the collapse of the Soviet Union in 1991. It was also exported to other countries, such as Finland, India, Iran, Iraq, Syria and Yugoslavia, as well as being copied elsewhere, both with and without licenses.

Czech T-72M4CZ firing

Licensed versions of the T-72 were made in Poland and Czechoslovakia, for Warsaw Pact consumers. Before 1990, Soviet-made T-72 export versions were similarly downgraded for non-Warsaw Pact customers (mostly the Arab countries). Many parts and tools are not interchangeable between the Soviet, Polish and Czechoslovak versions, which caused logistics problems.

Yugoslavia developed the T-72 into the more advanced M-84, and sold hundreds of them around the world during the 1980s. The Iraqis called their T-72 copies the "Lion of Babylon" (Asad Babil). These Iraqi tanks were assembled from knock-down kits sold to them by the Soviet Union as a means of evading the UN-imposed weapons embargo. More modern derivatives include the Polish PT-91 Twardy. Several countries, including Russia and Ukraine, also offer modernization packages for older T-72s.

Various versions of the T-72 have been in production for decades, and the specifications for its armour have changed considerably. Original T-72 tanks had homogeneous cast steel armour incorporating spaced armour technology and were moderately well protected by the standards of the early 1970s. In 1979, the Soviets began building T-72 modification with composite armour similar to the T-64 composite armour, in the front of the turret and hull. Late in the 1980s, T-72 tanks in Soviet inventory (and many of those elsewhere in the world as well) were fitted with reactive armour tiles.

TPD-K1 laser rangefinder system have appeared in T-72 tanks since 1974; earlier examples were equipped with parallax optical rangefinders, which could not be used for distances under 1,000 metres (1,100 yd). Some export versions of the T-72 lacked the laser rangefinder until 1985 or sometimes only the squadron and platoon commander tanks (version K) received them. After 1985, all newly made T-72s came with reactive armour as standard, the more powerful 840 bhp (630 kW) V-84 engine and an upgraded design main gun, which can fire guided anti-tank missiles from the barrel. With these developments, the T-72 eventually became almost as powerful as the more expensive T-80 tank, but few of these late variants reached the economically ailing Warsaw Pact allies and foreign customers before the Soviet bloc fell apart in 1990. In the 1990s some reserve T-72B were given a minor upgrade of an uprated engine and better gun stabilisation to become the T-72BA. While not a popular upgrade, it solved a temporary supply shortage.

Since 2000, export vehicles have been offered with thermal imaging night-vision gear of French manufacture as well (though it may be more likely that they might simply use the locally manufactured 'Buran-Catherine' system, which incorporates a French thermal imager). Depleted uranium armour-piercing ammunition for the 125 mm (4.9 in) gun has been manufactured in Russia in the form of the BM-32 projectile since around 1978, though it has never been deployed, and has less penetration than the later tungsten BM-42 and the newer BM-42M.

In 2010, Russia started an upgrade using the enormous stocks of T-72Bs held in reserve. The rebuild tank is called T-72B3 (Ob'yekt 184-M3).

In 2018, the 3rd Central Research Institute in Moscow had tested a proof-of-concept demonstration for robotic tank mobility, and was planning to further develop it based on the T-72B3 and other platforms.

In 2022, Ukrainian intelligence sources claimed that the upgrade of the Russian T-72 fleet has slowed during the invasion of Ukraine while production of the more modern T-90s and T-14 Armatas has slowed down because of the international sanctions affecting the Russian military industry. However, more tanks of T-72 and T-90 types were ordered in August 2022. A new batch of T-72B3M tanks was reportedly delivered in late 2022.

=== Models ===
Main models of the T-72, built in the Soviet Union and Russia. Command tanks have K added to their designation for komandirskiy, "command", for example T-72K is the command version of the basic T-72. Versions with reactive armour have V added, for vzryvnoy, "explosive".

T-72 Ural (1973)

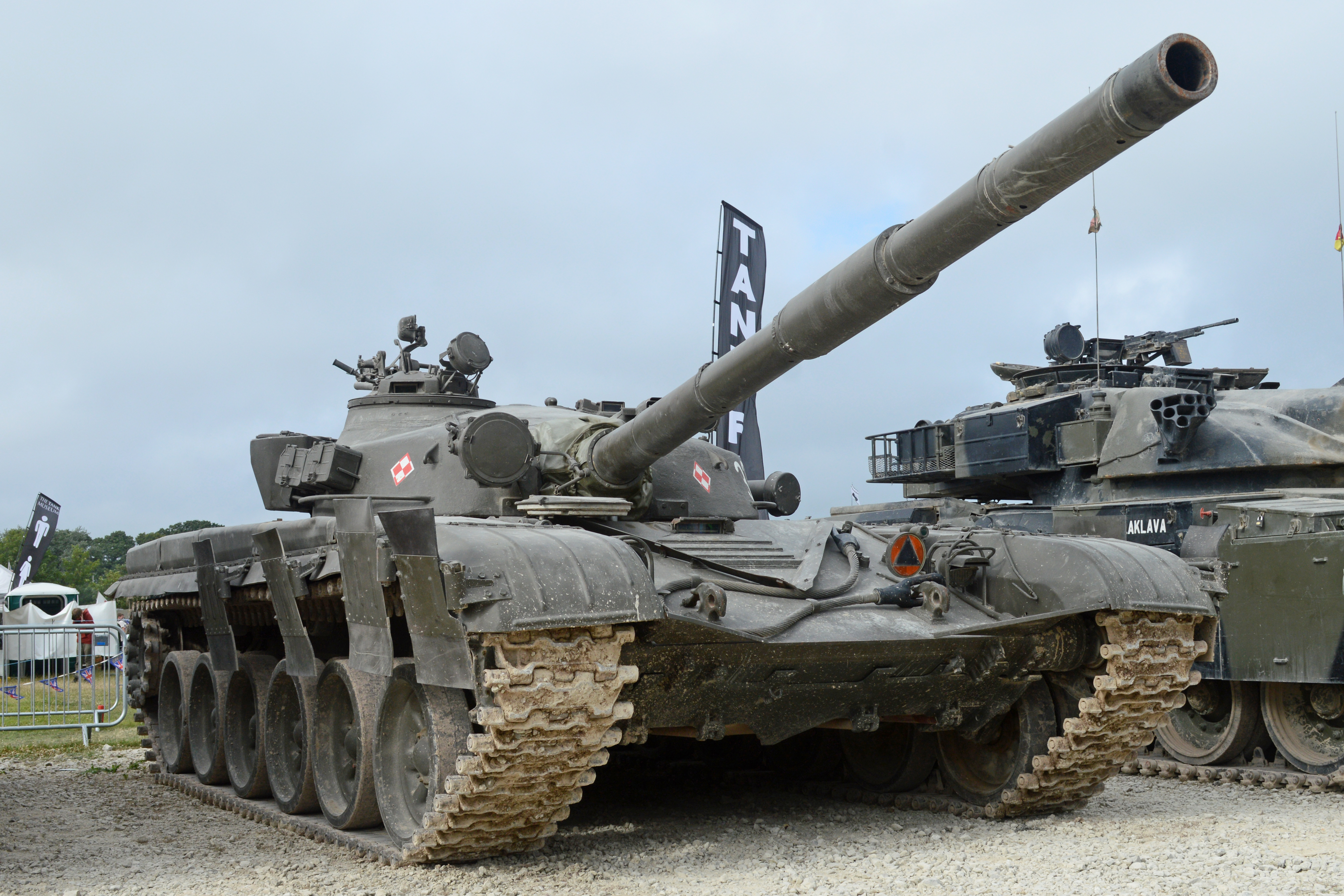
Polish T-72 at the Bovington Tank Museum

Original version, armed with 125 mm smoothbore tank gun and optical coincidence rangefinder.

T-72A (1979)

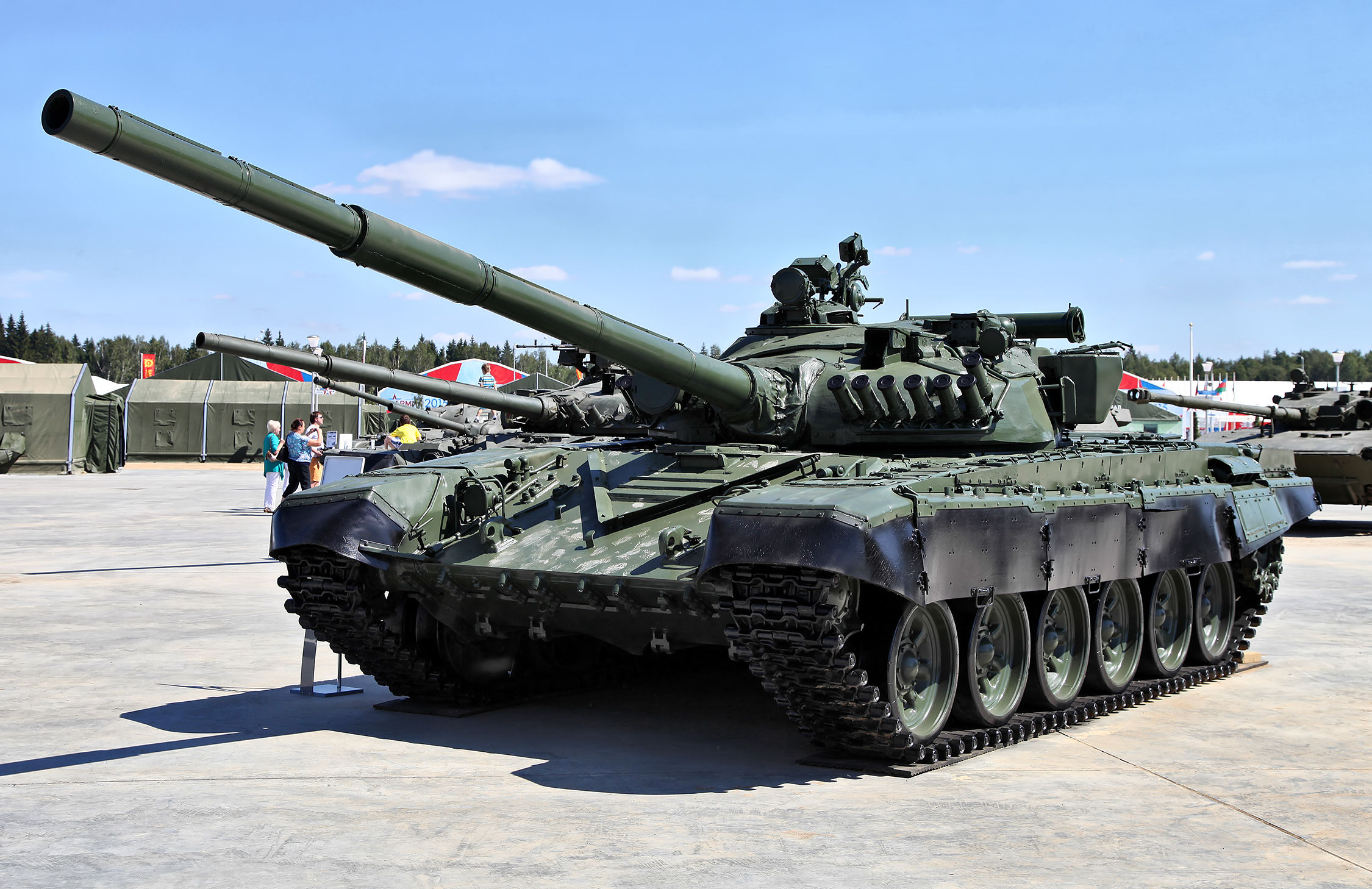
The upgraded T-72A which appeared in 1979. This vehicle is the basis for the T-72M1 export version.

Coincidence rangefinder replaced with laser rangefinder and electronic fire control added, turret front and top being heavily reinforced with composite armour (nicknamed Dolly Parton by US intelligence), provisions for mounting reactive armour, smoke grenade launchers, flipper armour mount on front mudguards, internal changes.
T-72M
Export versions based on the T-72 Ural. Entered service in 1978 (for the first T-72M version). Also built in Poland and former Czechoslovakia.
T-72B (1985)
New main gun, stabilizer, sights and fire control, 9K120 Svir guided missile system, upgraded hull composite armour consisting of high-hardness steel plates, improved composites in the turret armour, improved 840 hp (630 kW) engine.
T-72B3 model 2011 (~2010)
This upgrade was initiated in 2010 using the enormous stocks of T-72Bs held in reserve. They are rebuilt with new technologies including Sosna-U multichannel gunner's sight, new digital VHF radio, improved autoloader, 2A46M-2 gun to accommodate new ammunition, 9K119 Refleks guided missile system. New V-92S2 engine. Kontakt-5 explosive reactive armour. Lacks satellite navigation.
T-72B3 model 2016 or T-72B3M
Upgrade for T-72B3, with Relikt explosive reactive armour on the sides, side skirts with soft-container reactive armour and slat screens, 2A46M-5 gun with new ammunition, 9K119M Refleks-M guided missile system, V-92S2F 1,130 hp (840 kW) engine, automatic transmission, digital display and rear-view camera. Some T-72B3M’s have been observed in Ukraine with a noticeable increase in reverse speed, but there have been no official reports that the reverse transmission had been improved. Often incorrectly referred to as "T-72B4"

The T-72 design has been used into the following foreign models: T-72M4CZ (Czech Republic), PT-91 Twardy (Poland), M-84 (Yugoslavia), M-84AS1 (Serbia), M-84D (Croatia) and Lion of Babylon (Iraq).

=== Variants ===
In addition, the T-72 hull has been used as the basis for other heavy vehicle designs, including the following:

- BMPT Terminator – Heavy convoy and close tank support vehicle.
- TOS-1 – Thermobaric multiple rocket launcher, with 30-tube launcher in place of the turret.
- BREM-1 (Bronirovannaya Remonto-Evakuatsionnaya Mashina) – Armoured recovery vehicle with a 12-tonne crane, 25-tonne winch, dozer blade, towing equipment, and tools.
- IMR-2 (Inzhenernaya Mashina Razgrashdeniya) – Combat engineering vehicle with an 11-tonne telescoping crane and pincers, configurable dozer blade/plough, and mine-clearing system.
- MTU-72 (Tankovyy Mostoukladchik) – Armoured bridge layer, capable of laying a 50 t (55 short tons) capacity bridge spanning 18 m (59 ft) in three minutes.
- BMR-3 Vepr (Bronirovannaja Mashina Razminirovanija) – Mine clearing vehicle.

== Design characteristics ==
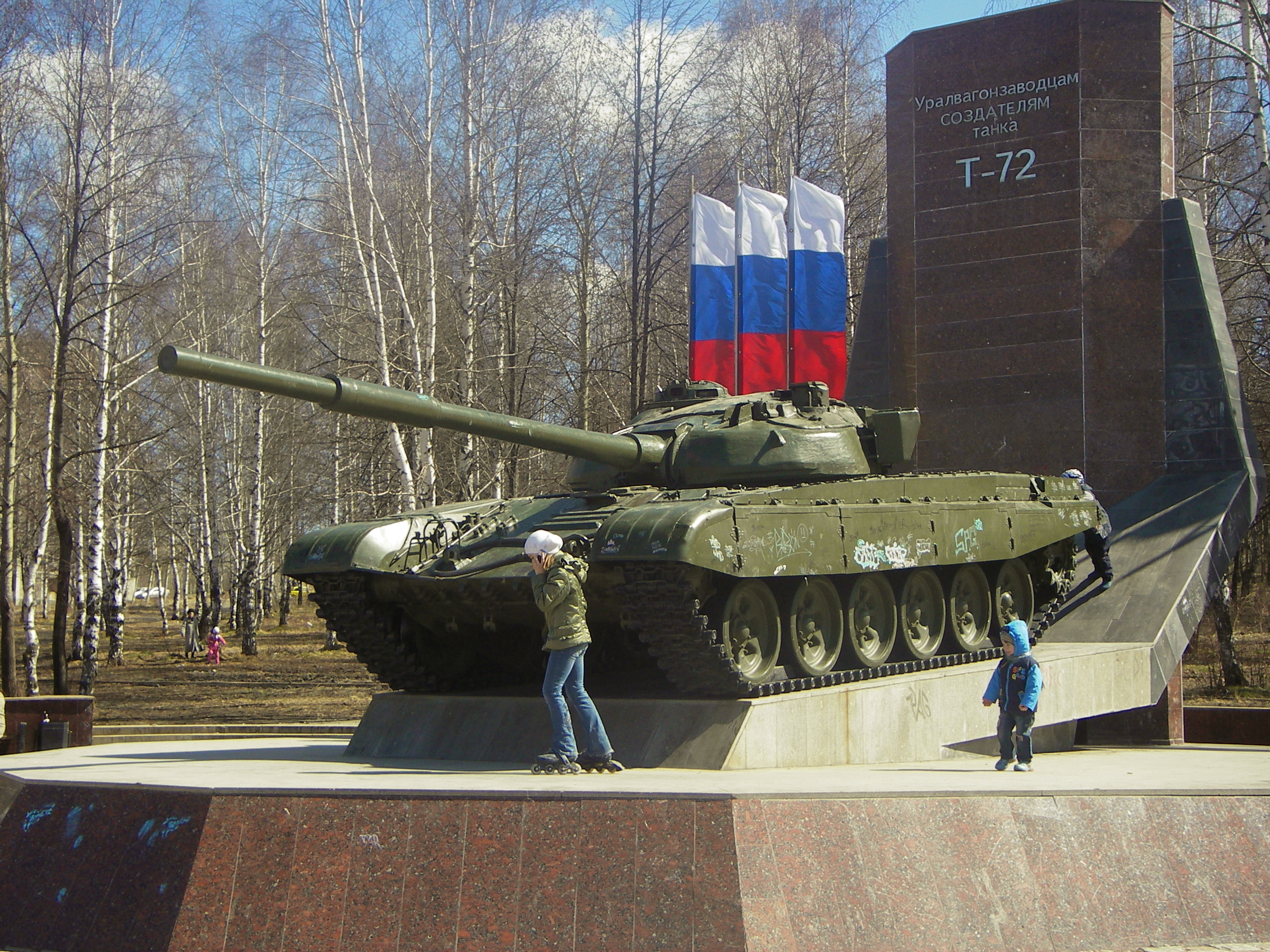
T-72 monument in its production place, Nizhny Tagil

=== Weight ===
The T-72 is extremely lightweight, at forty-one tonnes, and very small compared to Western main battle tanks. Some of the roads and bridges in former Warsaw Pact countries were designed such that T-72s can travel along in formation, but NATO tanks could not pass at all, or just one-by-one, significantly reducing their mobility. The basic T-72 is relatively underpowered, with a 780 hp (580 kW) supercharged version of the basic 500 hp (370 kW) V12 diesel engine originally designed for the World War II-era T-34. The 0.58 m (1 ft 11 in) wide tracks run on large-diameter road wheels, which allows for easy identification of the T-72 and descendants (the T-64 family has relatively small road wheels).

The T-72 is designed to cross rivers up to 5 m (16.4 ft) deep submerged using a small diameter snorkel assembled onsite. The crew is individually supplied with simple rebreather chest-pack apparatuses for emergency situations. If the engine stops underwater, it must be restarted within six seconds, or the T-72's engine compartment becomes flooded due to pressure loss. The snorkeling procedure is considered dangerous, but is important for maintaining operational mobility.

=== Nuclear, biological, and chemical protection ===
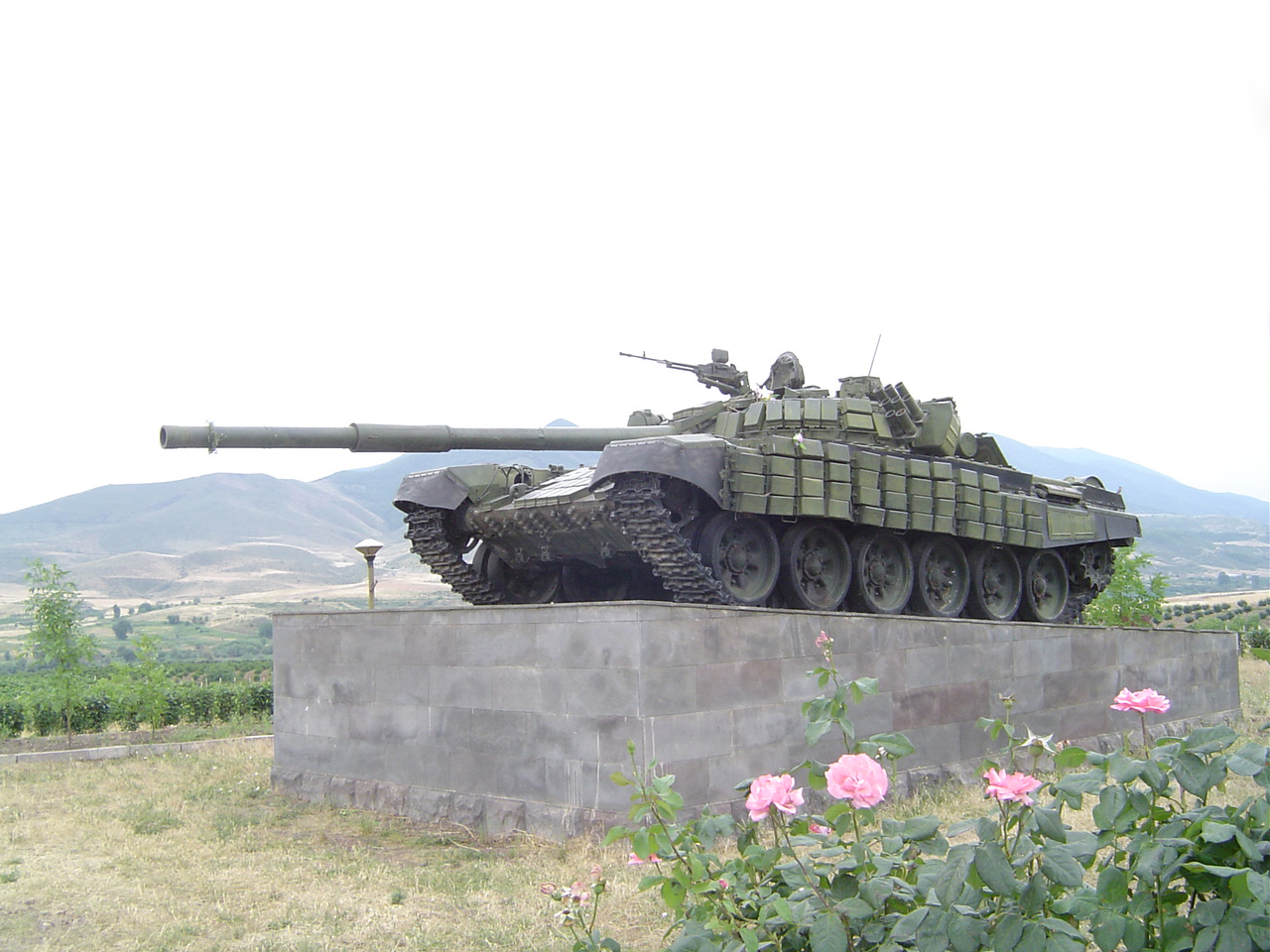
Memorial of a T-72 with ERA. The tank was advancing on Azerbaijani positions in Askeran when it hit a mine and its Armenian crew was killed in the resulting explosion. The tank was restored after the war.

The T-72 has a nuclear, biological, and chemical (NBC) protection system. The inside of both hull and turret is lined with a synthetic fabric made of boron compound, meant to reduce the penetrating radiation from neutron bomb explosions. The crew is supplied clean air via an air filter system. A slight over-pressure prevents entry of contamination via bearings and joints. Use of an autoloader for the main gun allows for more efficient forced smoke removal compared to traditional manually loaded ("pig-loader") tank guns, so NBC isolation of the fighting compartment can, in theory, be maintained indefinitely.

=== Interior ===
T-72 crew: 1-driver; 2-commander; 3-gunner; 4-auto-loading system

Like all Soviet-legacy tanks, the T-72's design has traded off interior space in return for a very small silhouette and efficient use of armour, to the point of replacing the fourth crewman with a mechanical loader. There is a widespread Cold War-era myth that Soviet tanks were so cramped that height constraints were put in place, with a maximum height of 5 ft 4in (163 cm). However, official regulations state that the T-72 allowed for a height of 5 ft 9in (175 cm), which was standard for other tanks at the time. The basic T-72 design has extremely small periscope viewports, even by the constrained standards of battle tanks and the driver's field of vision is significantly reduced when his hatch is closed. The steering system is a traditional dual-tiller layout instead of the easier-to-use steering wheel or steering yoke common in modern Western tanks. This set-up requires the near-constant use of both hands, which complicates employment of the seven speed manual transmission.

=== Armour ===
External images
- The cavity in the cast turret
- Laminated turret matrix of the T-72B

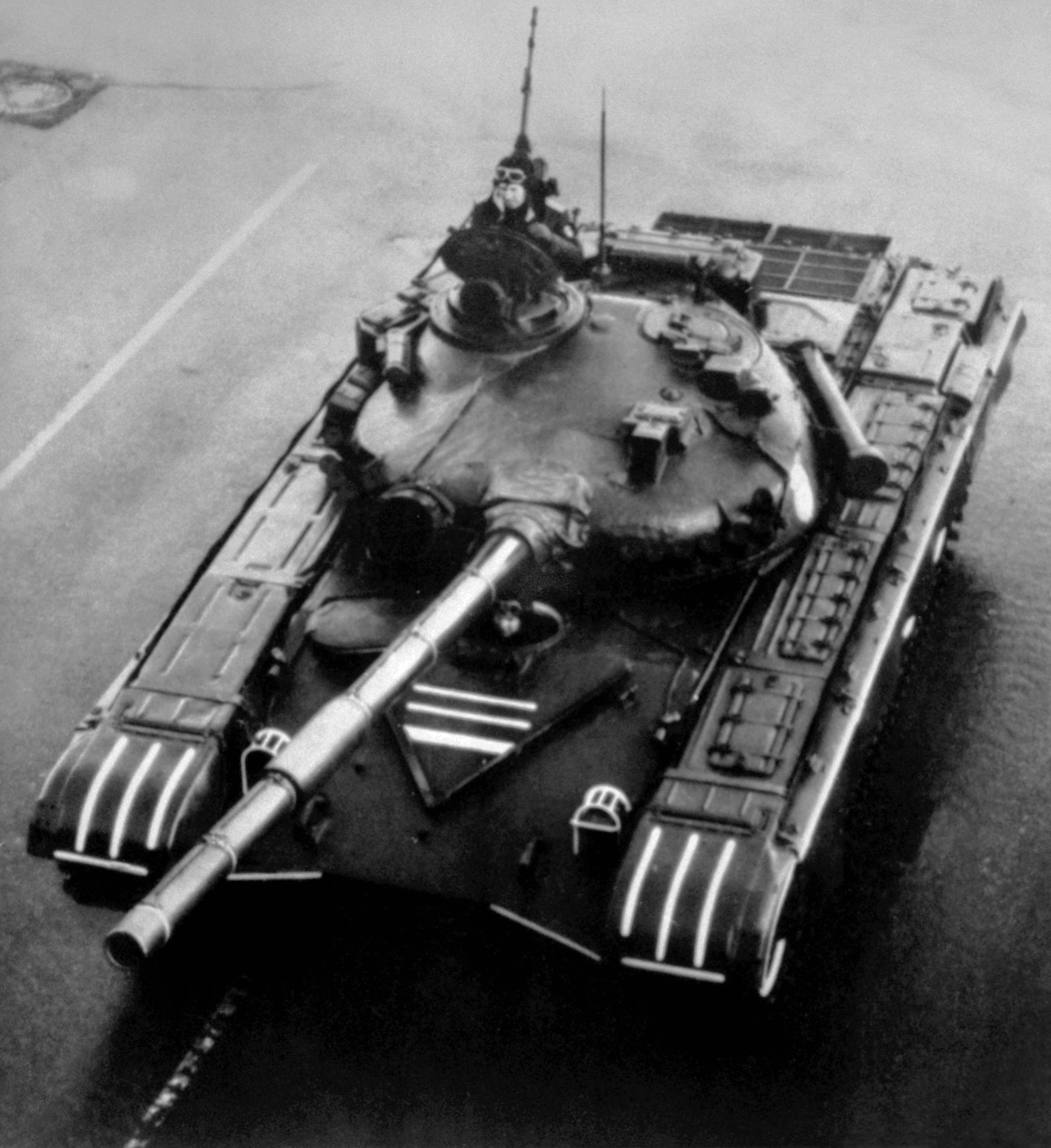
T-72A top view. This model sports thick "Dolly Parton" composite armour on the turret front.

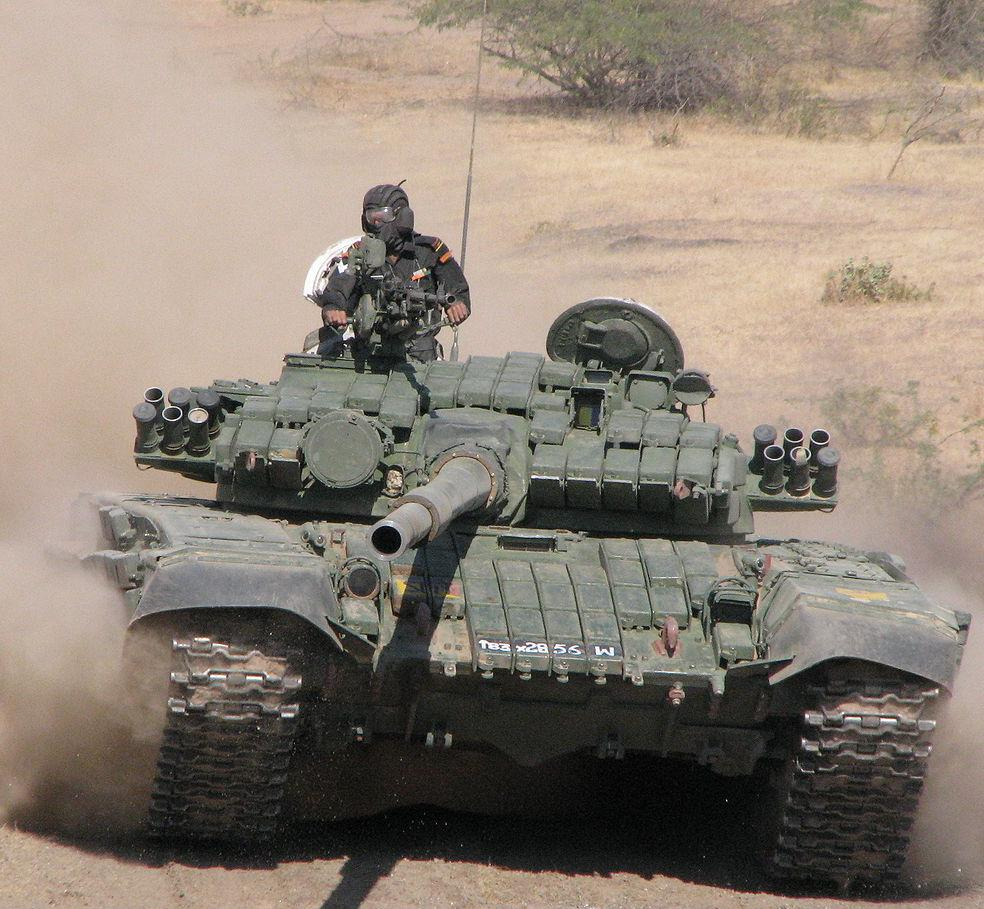
Indian T-72 with explosive reactive armour (ERA)

Armour protection of the T-72 was strengthened with each succeeding generation. The original T-72 "Ural" Object 172M's (from 1973) turret is made from conventional cast high hardness steel (HHS) armour with no laminate inserts. It is believed that the maximum thickness is 280 mm (11 in) and the nose is 80 mm (3.1 in). The glacis of the new laminated armour is 205 mm (8.1 in) thick, comprising 80 mm (3.1 in) HHS, 105 mm (4.1 in) double layer of laminate and 20 mm (0.79 in) RHA steel, which when inclined gives about 500–600 mm (20–24 in) thickness along the line of sight. In 1977 the armour of the T-72 Object 172M was slightly changed. The turret now featured insert filled with ceramic sand bars "kwartz" rods and the glacis plate composition was changed. It was now made up of 60 mm (2.4 in) HHA steel, 105 mm (4.1 in) glass Tekstolit laminate and 50 mm (2.0 in) RHA steel. This version was often known in Soviet circles as T-72 "Ural-1". The next armour update was introduced by the T-72A (Object 172M-1), which was designed in 1976 and replaced the original on the production lines during 1979–1985. With the introduction of the T-72B (Object 184) in 1985, the composite armour was again changed. According to retired major, James M. Warford, variants developed after the T-72 base model and T-72M/T-72G MBT, featured a cast steel turret that included a cavity filled with quartz or sand in a form similar to US "fused-silica" armour. The T-72 Model 1978 (Obiekt 172M sb-4), which entered production in 1977, featured a new turret with special armour composed of ceramic rods.

The T-72A featured a new turret with thicker, nearly vertical, frontal armour. Due to its appearance, it was unofficially nicknamed "Dolly Parton" armour by the US Army. This used the new ceramic-rod turret filler, incorporated improved glacis laminate armour, and mounted new anti-shaped-charge sideskirts.

The T-72M was identical to the base T-72 Ural model in terms of protection, retaining the monolithic steel turret. The modernized T-72M1 was closer to the T-72A in terms of protection. It featured an additional 16 mm (0.63 in) of high hardness steel appliqué armour on the glacis plate, which produced an increase of 43 mm (1.7 in) in line of sight thickness. It was also the first export variant with composite armour in the turret, containing ceramic rods sometimes called "sandbar armour". The turret armour composition was essentially identical to the T-72 "Ural-1" whereas Soviet-only T-72As had slightly increased turret protection.

Several T-72 models featured explosive reactive armour (ERA), which increased protection primarily against high-explosive anti-tank (HEAT) type weapons. Certain late-model T-72 tanks featured Kontakt-5 ERA, a form of universal ERA partly effective against kinetic penetrators. It was added to the T-72 as a response to testing conducted by the Soviet Union against captured Israeli Magach-4 tanks which found that the glacis of the T-72 could be penetrated by the 105mm M111 APDSFS Hetz ammunition.

Late model T-72s, such as the T-72B, featured improved turret armour, visibly bulging the turret front—nicknamed "super-Dolly Parton" armour by Western intelligence. The turret armour of the T-72B was the thickest and most effective of all Soviet tank armour; it was even thicker than the frontal armour of the T-80B. The T-72B used a new "reflecting-plate armour" (bronya s otrazhayushchimi listami), in which the frontal cavity of the cast turret was filled with a laminate of alternating steel and non-metallic (rubber) layers. The glacis was also fitted with 20 mm (0.8 in) of appliqué armour. The late production versions of the T-72B/B1 and T-72A variants also featured an anti-radiation layer on the hull roof.

Early model T-72s did not feature side skirts; instead, the original base model featured gill or flipper-type armour panels on either side of the forward part of the hull. When the T-72A was introduced in 1979, it was the first model to feature the plastic side skirts covering the upper part of the suspension, with separate panels protecting the side of the fuel and stowage panniers.

After the collapse of the USSR, US and German analysts had a chance to examine Soviet-made T-72 tanks equipped with Kontakt-5 ERA, and they proved impenetrable to most Cold War US and German tank projectiles and anti-tank weapons. A U.S. Army spokesperson claimed at the show, "the myth of Soviet inferiority in this sector of arms production that has been perpetuated by the failure of downgraded T-72 export tanks in the Gulf Wars has, finally, been laid to rest. The results of these tests show that if a NATO/Warsaw Pact confrontation had erupted in Europe, the Soviets would have had parity (or perhaps even superiority) in armour". KE-effective ERA, such as Kontakt-5, drove the development of M829A3 ammunition.

Late 1980s, Soviet developed Object 187 (Объект 187, or T-72BI), it was a parallel project to Object 188 (the T-90 tank). It was based on the T-72B, with a heavily modified turret. The 'Object 187' used composite armour for the turret ("Super Dolly Parton" composite armour) and the hull front, and RHA for the rest of the tank. It possibly consisted of special materials including ceramic or high density uranium alloys. Maximum physical thickness of the passive armour (not counting the reactive armour – ERA) was up to 950 mm RHA. With Kontakt-5 ERA, T-72BI's frontal armour was immune to the NATO's 120 mm L/44 tank gun. However, after the Soviet collapse, the tank was not accepted.

In 2021, Russian Army T-72B3s were seen fitted with raised mesh screens above their turrets. The screens appeared to act as a type of slat armour attempting to protect the tanks from top attack weapons such as the FGM-148 Javelin ATGM and small air-to-ground munitions fired from unmanned aerial vehicles (UAVs).

==== Estimated protection level ====
The following table shows the estimated protection level of different T-72 models in rolled homogeneous armour equivalency, i.e., the composite armour of the turret of a T-72B offers as much protection against an armour-piercing fin-stabilized discarding sabot (APFSDS) round as a 520 mm (20 in) thick armour steel layer.

Model	Turret vs APFSDS		Turret vs HEAT		Hull vs APFSDS		Hull vs HEAT	
Model	mm	in	mm	in	mm	in	mm	in
T-72 'Ural' (1973)	480–510	19–20	740–800	29–31	335–410	13.2–16.1	410–450	16–18
T-72A (1979–1985)/(1988)+Kontakt 1	410–500	16–20	500–560	20–22	360–420	14–17	490–500	19–20
T-72M (1980)	380	15	490	19	335	13.2	450	18
T-72M1 (1982)	380	15	490	19	400	16	490	19
T-72B+Kontakt 1 (1985)	520–540	20–21	900–950	35–37	480–530	19–21	900	35
T-72B+Kontakt 5 (1988)	770–800	30–31	1,180	46	690	27	940	37

Kontakt 1 or 5 can be replaced with Relikt, a later ERA package that defends against tandem-charge warheads and reduces penetration of APFSDS rounds by over 50 percent. For a T-72B, adding Relikt improves APFSDS protection on the turret to 1,000–1,050 mm, and on the hull to 950–1,000 mm. Relikt is mounted as standard on the T-90MS, while Kontakt 5 is still standard on the T-90S.

=== Gun ===
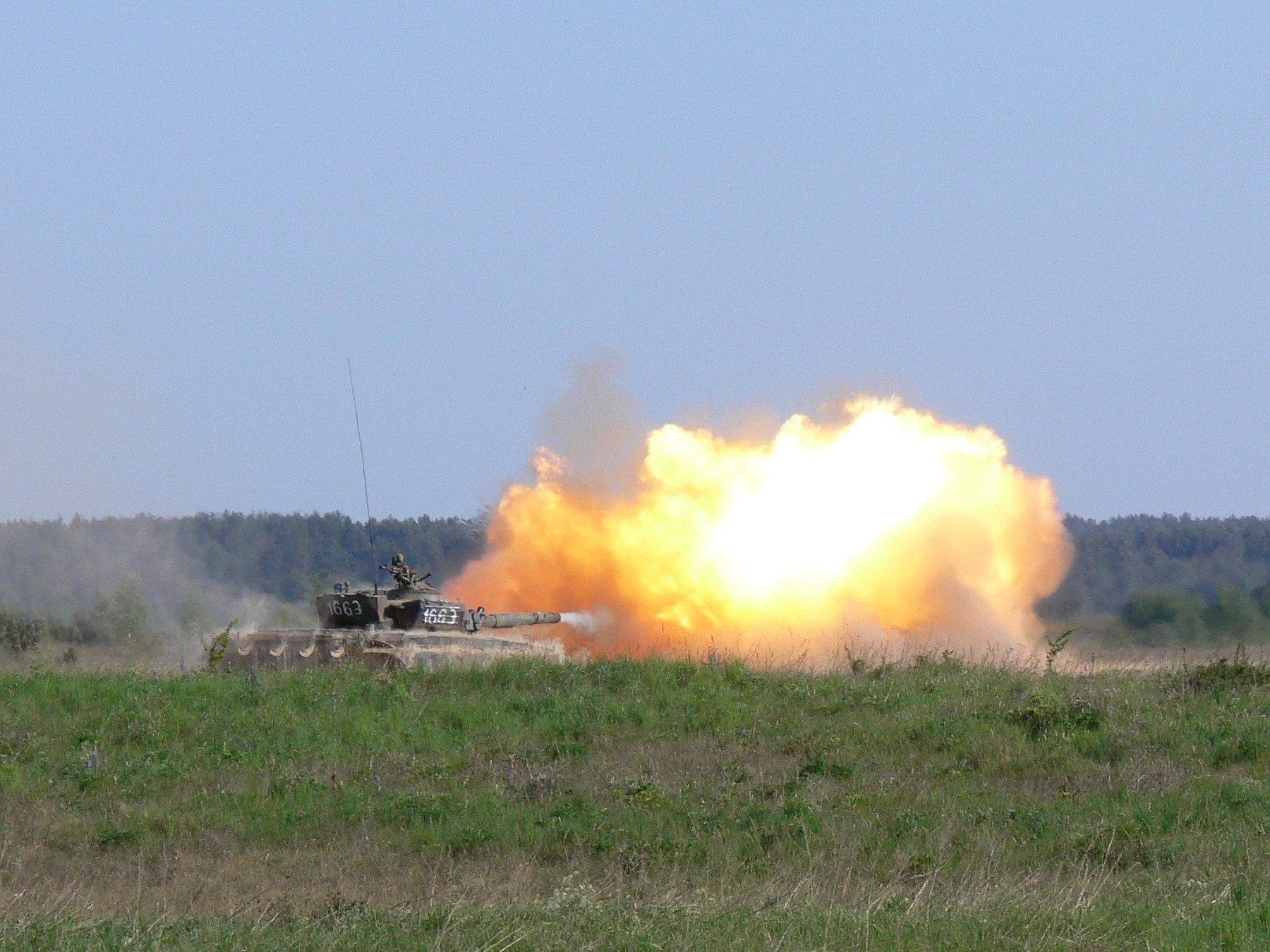
Polish T-72 firing during training

The T-72 is equipped with the 125 mm (4.9 in) 2A46 series main gun, a significantly larger (20-mm larger) calibre than the standard 105 mm (4.1 in) gun found in contemporary Western MBTs, and still slightly larger than the 120 mm/L44 found in many modern Western MBTs. As is typical of Soviet tanks, the gun can fire anti-tank guided missiles, and standard main gun ammunition, including HEAT and APFSDS rounds.

The original T-72 Object 172M (1973) used the 2A26M2 model gun, which had been first mounted on the T-64. The barrel had a length of 6350 mm or 50.8 calibers and had a maximum rated chamber pressure of 450 MPa. The cannon had an electroplated chrome lining but lacked a thermal sleeve. The cannon was capable of firing 3VBM-3 rounds with 3BM-9 steel projectile sabot and 3VBM-6 rounds with 3BM-12 Tungsten sabot APFSDS projectile, allowing respectively 245 mm (9.6 in) and 280 mm (11 in) penetration of RHA steel at 2000m at a 0-degree angle. In addition to APFSDS rounds, T-72 Object 172M could also fire 3VBK-7 rounds incorporating 3BK-12 HEAT warheads and 3VBK-10 rounds incorporating 3BK-14 HEAT warheads. HEAT rounds allowed respectively 420 mm (17 in) and 450 mm (18 in) penetration of RHA steel at a 0-degree angle. The High Explosive rounds provided included 3WOF-22 rounds with 3OF-19 warheads or 3WOF-36 rounds with 3OF-26 warheads. For all types of rounds, Zh40 propellant was used. Complementing the original gun setup was a 2E28M "Siren" two-plane electrohydraulic stabilizer allowing automatic stabilization with speeds from 0.05 to 6 degrees per second.

Even as the T-72 Object 172M (1973) was entering production new ammunition was developed to offset armour developments in the West. Beginning in 1972, two new APFSDS rounds were introduced, the 3VBM-7 round with 3BM-15 Tungsten sabot projectile and the "cheaper" 3VBM-8 round with 3BM-17 sabot but without the tungsten carbide plug. These allowed penetration of respectively 310 mm (12 in) and 290 mm (11 in) RHA steel at 2000 m at 0-degree angle. At the same time, a universal Zh52 propellant charge was introduced. The 3VBM-7 was the most common APFSDS round found in T-72 Object 172M tanks during the 1970s.

The stated barrel life expectancy of the 2A26M2 model gun was 600 rounds of HE/HEAT equivalent to 600 EFC (Effective Full Charge) or 150 rounds of APFSDS.

The main gun of the T-72 has a mean error of 1 m (39.4 in) at a range of 1,800 m (1,968.5 yd). Its maximum firing distance is 3,000 m (3,280.8 yd), due to limited positive elevation. The limit of aimed fire is 4,000 m (4,374.5 yd) with the gun-launched anti-tank guided missile. The T-72's main gun is fitted with an integral pressure reserve drum, which assists in rapid smoke evacuation from the bore after firing. The 125 millimeter gun barrel is certified strong enough to ram the tank through forty centimeters of iron-reinforced brick wall, though doing so will negatively affect the gun's accuracy when subsequently fired.

The vast majority of T-72s do not have advanced FLIR thermal imaging sights, which allow night vision at longer ranges and with no infrared lamps. Most of the T-72s possess the characteristic 'Luna' Infrared illuminator. Export upgrades allow for installation of advanced night sights.

=== Autoloader ===
External videos
- Autoloader animation on YouTube

Like the earlier domestic-use-only T-64, the T-72 is equipped with an automatic loading system, eliminating the need for a dedicated crewmember, decreasing the size and weight of the tank.

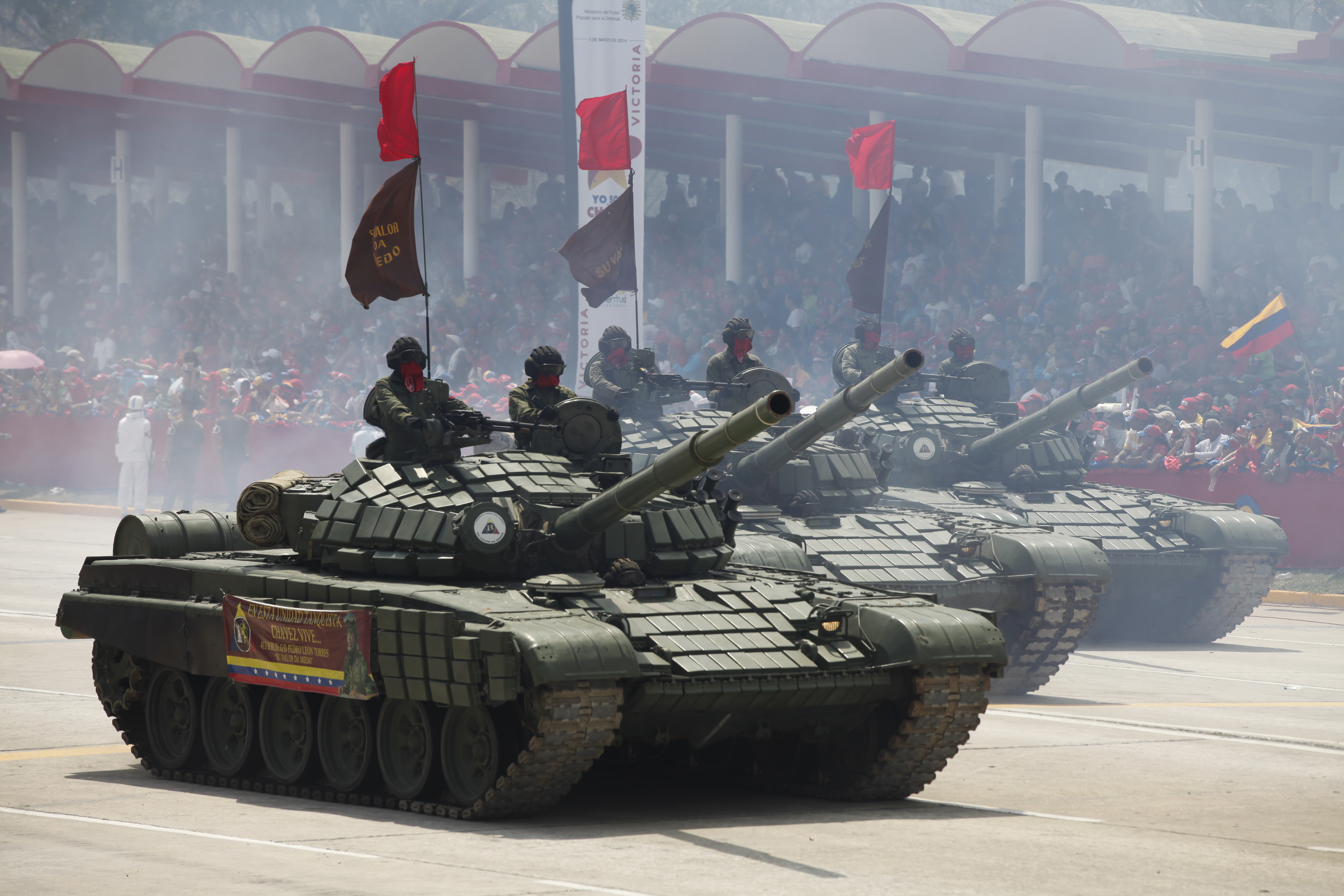
T-72B1V tanks of the Venezuelan Army during a parade in homage to the former president Hugo Chávez, March 2014

However, the autoloader is of a noticeably different design, an autoloader-equipped reloading system can reduce the number of crew members required; however, if the system malfunctions, the autoloader ceases to function. Both the T-64 and T-72 carry their two-section 125 mm ammunition (shell and full propellant charge, or missile and reduced propellant charge) in separate loading trays positioned on top of each other; but firstly, in T-64, 28 of these were arranged vertically as a ring under the turret ring proper, and were rotated to put the correct tray into position under the hoist system in the turret rear. This had the disadvantage of cutting the turret off from the rest of the tank, most notably, the driver. Accessing the hull required partial removal of the trays. The T-72 uses a design that has lower width requirements and does not isolate the turret compartment: the trays are arranged in a circle at the very bottom of the fighting compartment; the trade-off is the reduction of the number of trays to 22. The second difference is that in the T-64 the trays were hinged together and were flipped open as they were brought into position, allowing both the shell/missile and propellant charge to be rammed into the breech in one motion; in the T-72 the tray is brought to the breech as-is, with the shell in the lower slot and the charge in the upper one, and the mechanical rammer sequentially loads each of them, resulting in a longer reloading cycle.

The autoloader has a minimum cycle of 6.5 seconds (ATGM 8 seconds) and a maximum cycle of 15 seconds for reload, in later versions the sequence mode allows to reload in less than 5 seconds, allowing to reach 3 shots in 13 seconds.

The autoloader system also includes an automated casing removal mechanism that ejects the propellant case through an opening port in the back of the turret during the following reload cycle.

The autoloader disconnects the gun from the vertical stabilizer and cranks it up three degrees above the horizontal in order to depress the breech end of the gun and line it up with the loading tray and rammer. While loading, the gunner can still aim because he has a vertically independent sight. With a laser rangefinder and ballistic computer, final aiming takes at least another three to five seconds, but it is pipelined into the last steps of auto-loading and proceeds concurrently.

In addition to the 22 autoloaded rounds, the T-72 carries 17 rounds conventionally in the hull, which can be loaded into the emptied autoloader trays or directly into the gun.

The T-72B3 modernization replaced the old autoloader with a new one to fit longer projectiles such as 3BM59 and 3BM60. Previous variants are limited and may only carry older APFSDS rounds that can not exceed a certain length, therefore allowing less performance from anti-tank rounds.

The way that the unused rounds are stored in the autoloader system has been exposed as a flaw, as observers have noted that penetrating hits can easily set off a chain reaction that detonates all of the ammunition. The result is the turret is blown off resulting in a so-called "jack-in-the-box" explosion. This vulnerability was first observed during the Gulf War. However, contrary to popular belief, the flaw is mostly related to the spare ammunition in the turret, outside of the autoloader. The autoloaders have some ballistic protection, but only hold roughly half of a T-72’s ammunition. During the Chechen war in 1994, the Russians were able to reduce their losses by having their tanks carry fewer rounds so that all the ammunition and propellant was stored in the autoloaders.

== Operators and service ==
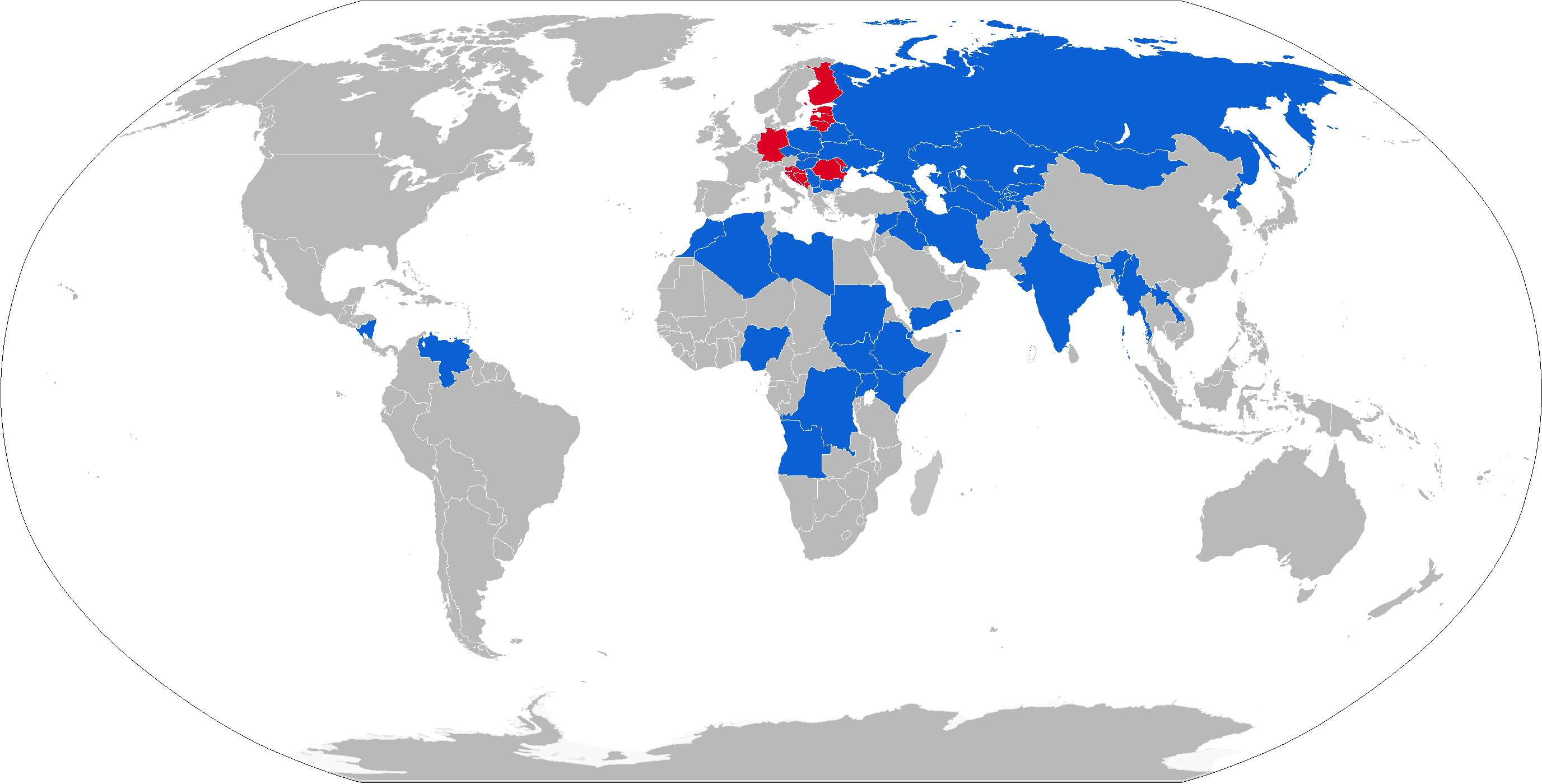
Operators: Current Former

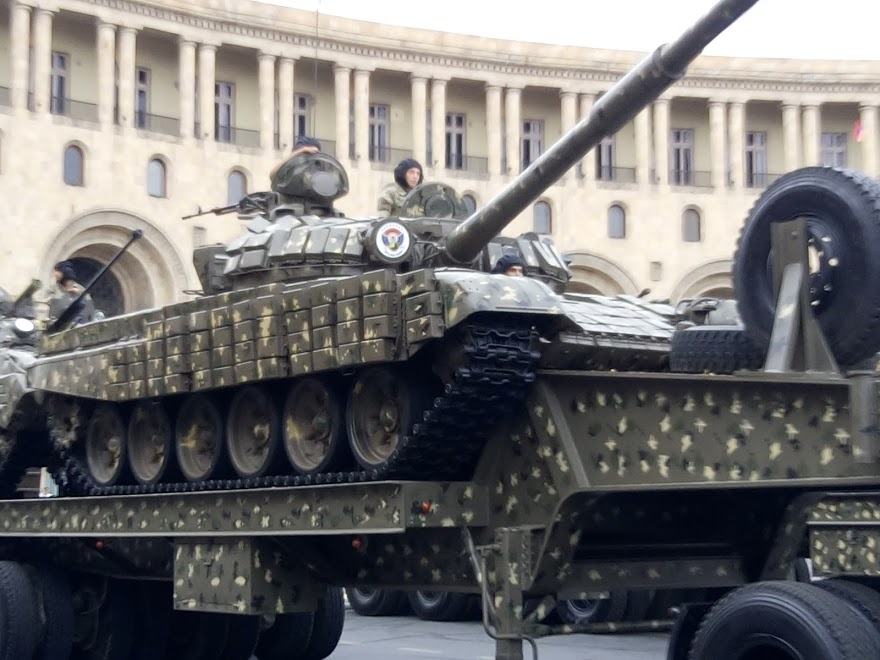
Armenian T-72B during the military parade in Yerevan.

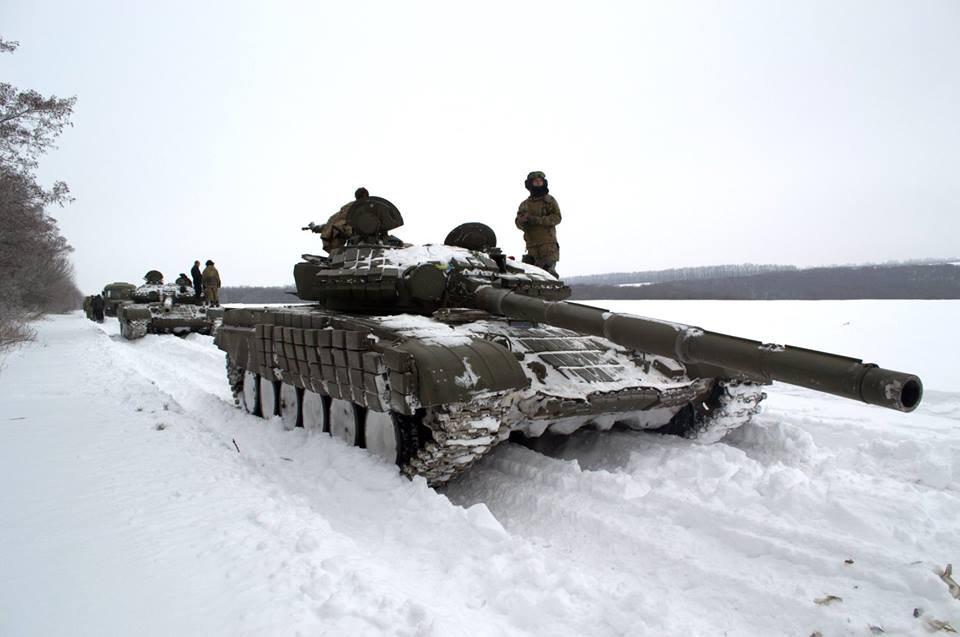
Ukrainian T-72AV during training, 2018.

The T-72 was never used in the Afghanistan war. The 40th Soviet Army that was deployed there had mainly T-55, and T-62 tanks.

The Russian Federation had over 10,000 T-72 tanks in use, including around 2,000 in active service and 8,000 in reserve (mostly T-72Bs). The T-72 has been used by the Russian Army in the fighting during the First and Second Chechen Wars, the Russo-Georgian War, and the Russo-Ukrainian War. The T-72 has been used by over 40 countries worldwide.

In a deal signed on 7 March 2025, India acquired advanced 1,000 HP engines for its Soviet-era T-72 tanks, enhancing its battlefield capabilities. The deal also included technology transfer to India for domestic production.

=== Syria ===
In the 1982 Lebanon War, Syrian T-72s are believed to have engaged Israeli tanks (M60A1, Magach or possibly Merkava tanks) in the south of Lebanon. On 9 June 1982, the Syrian General HQ ordered a brigade of the 1st Armoured Division, recently equipped with T-72 tanks, to move straight ahead, cross the border, and hit the right flank of the Israeli units advancing along the eastern side of Beka'a valley. The ensuing battle staved off further Israeli advance and 10 IDF main battle tanks were destroyed. After the war, Syrian president Hafez al-Assad called it "the best tank in the world".

The T-72 was used extensively in the Syrian Civil War by the Syrian Arab Army from 2011 onwards. Several captured units have been used by anti-government forces, including the rebel Free Syrian Army, and jihadist groups such as the Islamic Front and the Islamic State of Iraq and Syria.

Initially, the insurgent forces used IEDs and RPG-7 ambush tactics against the government armoured forces. Later, the rebels obtained modern Russian RPGs and Yugoslav M79 Osas, which were used successfully against T-72s. Starting in 2012, the capture from Syrian stocks and later direct delivery by external sponsors of modern anti-tank guided missiles, including Chinese-made HJ-8, Soviet-made 9K111 Fagot, 9M113 Konkurs, and 9K115 Metis, and U.S.-made BGM-71 TOW missile enabled the opposition forces to engage and destroy any government armoured vehicle types, T-72 included, from safer distances. As of March 2020, at least 837 T-72 tanks operated by the Syrian armed forces were destroyed according to visual recordings.

=== Iraq ===
Iraqi T-72 Ural (1973)s, T-72 Ural Modernization, T-72Ms and T-72M1s were used successfully throughout the Iran-Iraq War and in countless operations, among others Operation Nasr, in the battle for Basra and during the Tawakalna ala Allah Operations. 105 mm M68 tank guns and TOW missiles proved ineffective against the frontal armour of Iraqi T-72s. Sixty T-72 tanks were lost during the eight years of war. Ra'ad Al-Hamdani, an Iraqi general in the Iraqi Republican Guard, stating "The 16th Iranian Armoured Division, which was equipped with Chieftain tanks, lost a battle against the 10th Iraqi Armoured Brigade with T-72 tanks. It is hard for an armoured brigade to destroy a division in 12 hours but it happened; it was a disaster for the Iranians". Out of the 894 Chieftain tanks that had started the war only 200 were left by the war's end. The 3BM9 APFSDS shell was more than enough to deal with any NATO tank of the time, including the most heavily armoured such as the M60A1 and the Chieftain. According to a Soviet analysis of an Iranian Chieftain captured by the Iraqi army during the early part of the Iran-Iraq war, the Chieftain Mk.5 was considered to have totally insufficient protection even at its strongest points. The frontal part of the entire turret, hull upper front plate and lower front plate could all be defeated at 3 km or more. This essentially means that the T-72 Ural could defeat one of NATO's toughest tanks at any reasonable combat distance. According to Iranians and Iraqis, the T-72 was the most feared tank of the Iran–Iraq War.

During the invasion of Kuwait Iraq used 690 tanks, mainly T-55s, T-62s and T-72s. Kuwait had 281 tanks, including 6 T-72s, 165 Chieftains, 70 Vickers and 40 Centurions. On the morning of 2 August, near the Mutla Pass, a tank battle took place between the Vickers tanks of the 6th Kuwaiti Mechanized Brigade and the T-72s of the Republican Guard's 17th Armoured Brigade, 1st Hammurabi Armoured Division. Kuwaiti tanks were able to knock out one T-72 during the ambush, but were defeated in response with the commander of the 6th brigade captured. Only 20 surviving Vickers tanks were able to retreat to Saudi Arabia.

The Iraqi-assembled T-72 version Lion of Babylon engaged coalition forces in both Iraq wars. The Battle of 73 Easting took place during a sandstorm in the Iraqi desert. U.S. M1A1s and Bradley Fighting Vehicles came up against Iraqi Republican Guard T-72Ms and BMPs and inflicted 37 losses on the Iraqi armoured forces, while losing a single Bradley to enemy fire. The primary attack was conducted by 2ACR's three squadrons of about 400 soldiers, along with the 1st Infantry Division's two leading brigades, who attacked and destroyed the Iraqi 18th Mechanized Brigade and 37th Armoured Brigade of the Tawakalna Division, each consisting of between 2,500 and 3,000 personnel. The Iraqi T-72Ms used 3BM9 shells (removed from Soviet service in 1973), with a penetration of 245 mm at a distance of up to 2,500 meters (8,200 ft). However, the T-72 was largely outmatched by coalition armor particularly the M1A1 Abrams, with M1A1 crews reporting several direct frontal hits fired from Iraqi T-72s resulting in minimal damage. As well the M1A1 Abrams had superior sighting/imaging capabilities allowing it to engage the T-72 from further distances and in conditions such as fog or night. The total number of T-72s lost during Operation Desert Storm was approximately 150.

As of 1996, Iraq had 776 T-72 tanks in service from 1,038 originally received.

=== Chechen wars ===
During the First Chechen War (December 1994 to September 1996) fought between the Russian Federation and the self-proclaimed Chechen Republic of Ichkeria, led by Dzhokhar Dudayev, the Russian Federation deployed both T-72 and T-80 tanks. Russian AFV losses during the first three months fighting amounted to 62 tank (T-72/T-80) losses (44 T-72s of 141, 18 T-80s of 71 and 0 PT-76s of 9). Analysis of damage to non repairable vehicles showed that no T-72 were lost to frontal penetration of the hull from man portable anti tank weapons.

Analysis of the causes of these losses indicated the majority were caused by Chechen four-man anti-armour hunter-killer teams consisting of a gunner armed with a Russian RPG-7 or RPG-18 shoulder-fired antitank rocket launcher, and a machine gunner and a sniper, with five or six such teams simultaneously attacking a single armoured vehicle. The majority of losses recorded occurred from three to six kill shot hits to the sides, top and rear of a vehicle.

Highlighted were serious tactical deployment failures, once again demonstrating doctrine and tactics being a primary factor in determining a tank's worth. Following the serious losses to the Russian Federation during their first assault upon Grozny, armoured tactics were revised. Russian armoured vehicle losses dropped off with their change in tactics to have Russian infantry move in front, with armoured combat vehicles in support of the infantry. In particular use of AAA armoured vehicles, these vehicles can elevate their main armament to higher angles than the T-72 .

The Russian army captured seven of Dudayev's T-72s and used them in combat. During the First Chechen War, at least two tank duels took place. In the first, Dudayev's T-72A knocked out one T-62M belonging to pro-Russian Chechens. In the second, one of Dudayev's T-72As was destroyed by a Russian T-72B. Three Russian T-72s are recorded as destroyed, at the hands of Chechen separatists, including one tank during the Second Chechen War, during the period 1997 to 2003.

=== Russo-Georgian War ===
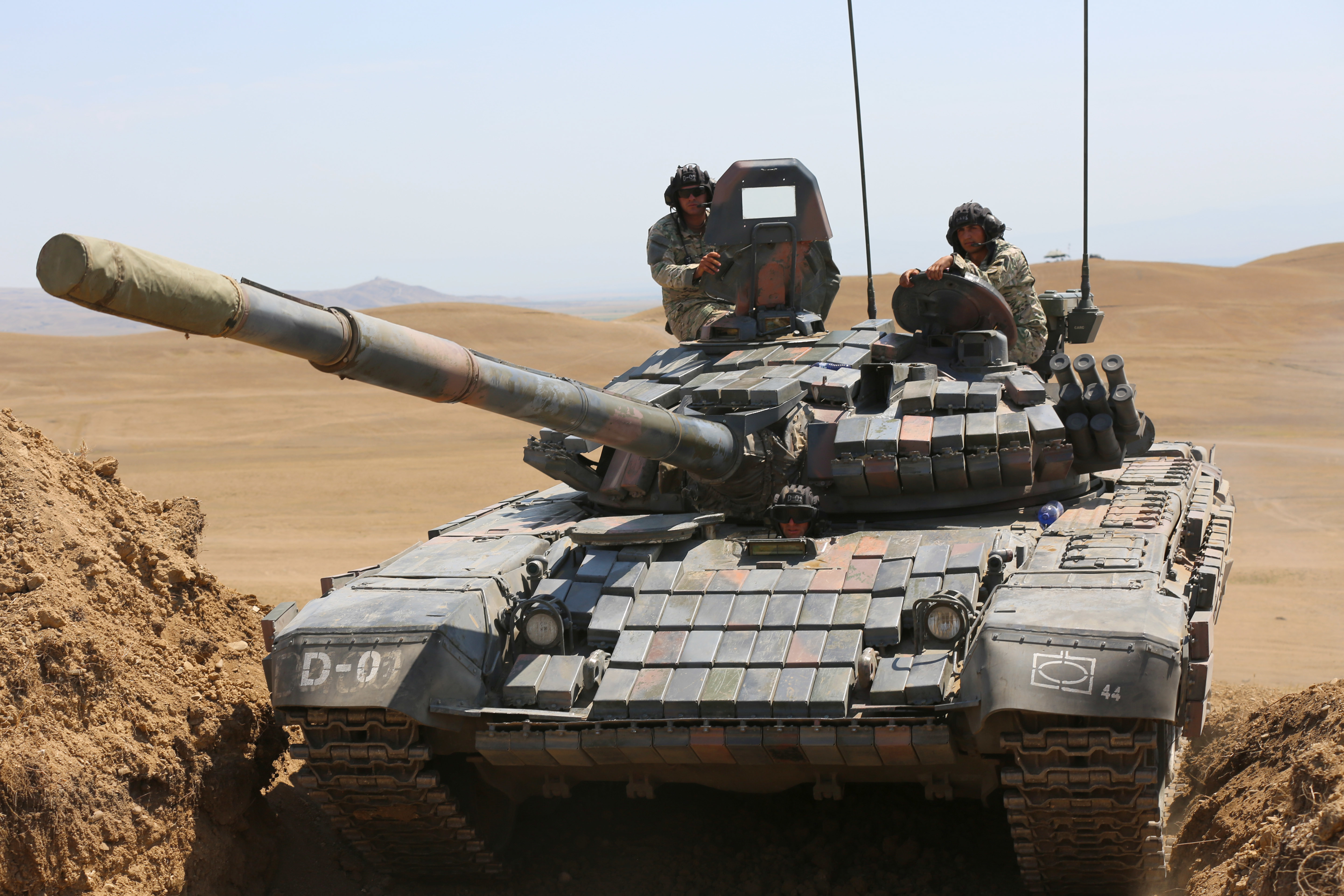
Georgian Army T-72SIM1.

During the war in South Ossetia in 2008 both sides deployed great numbers of T-72 tanks. At the time of the conflict, the Georgian military fielded 191 T-72 tanks of which 120 were modified to T-72SIM1s. The Georgian army deployed a total of 75 of its T-72 tanks into South Ossetia. The Georgian military lost 30 T-72s, ten in combat during the fighting around Tskhinvali, and another 20 destroyed by Russian paratroopers after their capture.

=== Russo-Ukrainian War ===
==== War in Donbas ====
On 26 August 2014, the International Institute for Strategic Studies claimed that it had identified a mixed Russian column composed of at least 3 T-72B/BAs and a lone T-72B3 in the war in Donbas. The significance of this sighting was that Russia attempted to maintain plausible deniability over the issue of supplying tanks and other arms to the separatists. Russia continuously claimed that any tanks operated by the separatists must have been captured from Ukraine's own army. The T-72B3 is in service with the Russian Army in large numbers. This modernized T-72 is not known to have been exported to nor operated by any other country. The separatists were supplied with dozens of T-72s in 2014 with T-72 models A, B and mod. 1989. The delivery from Russia of the tanks was is well documented such as in Rostov oblast.

In an interview with Dorzhi Batomunkuev in March 2015, it was revealed that he had operated a T-72B as part of a 32 tank Russian army unit when fighting for Debaltseve in Ukraine in February 2015. His tank was destroyed and he suffered severe burns.

Before the conflict Ukraine had 600 T-72s in storage. However, encountering a deficiency of serviceable armoured vehicles, the Ukrainian Ministry of Defence began returning some of the T-72s to service.

==== Russian invasion of Ukraine ====
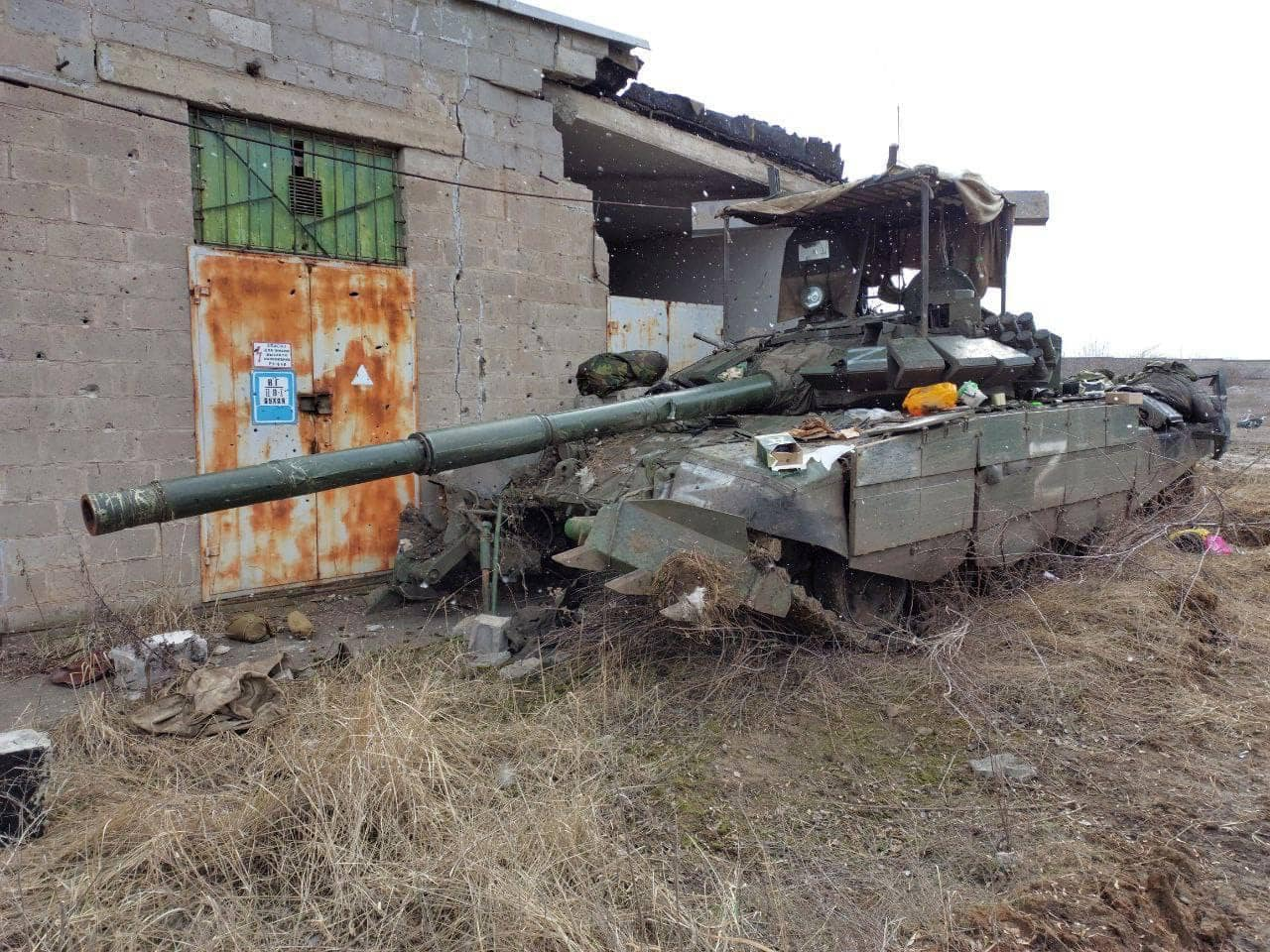
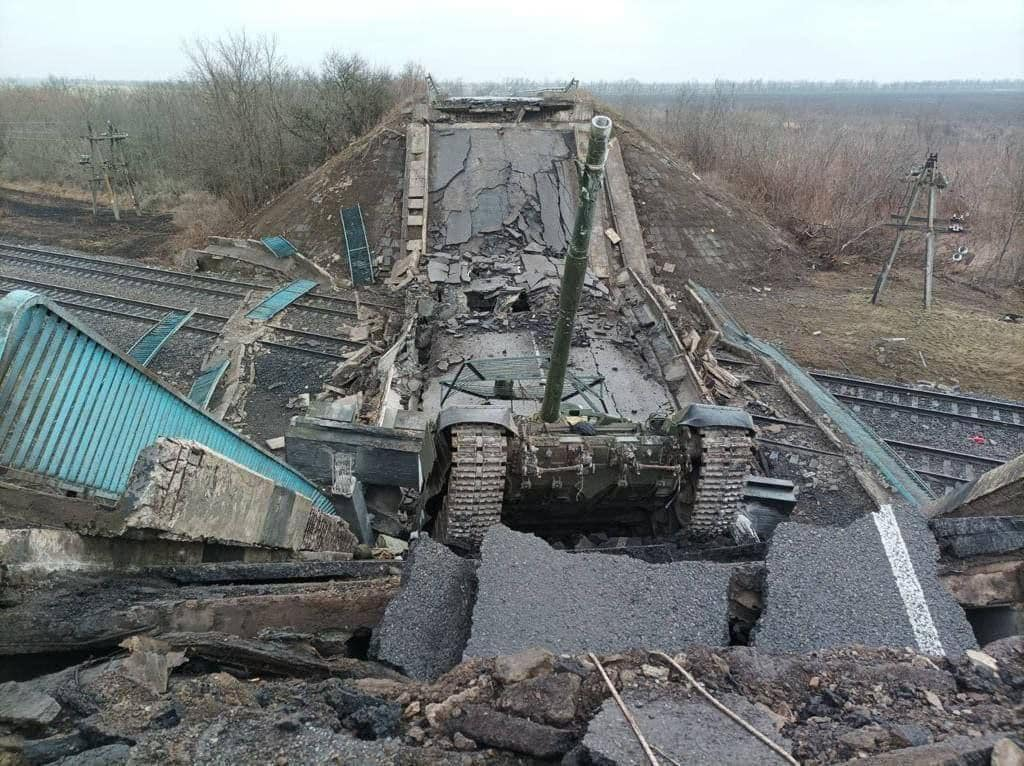
Examples of abandoned Russian T-72B3 mod. 2016 (top) and T-72B mod. 1989 (bottom) tanks with various different makeshift steel grilles variants attached to the turret, during the Russian invasion of Ukraine.

The T-72 has seen extensive service in the 2022 Russian invasion of Ukraine on both sides.

Russia's most numerous tank is the T-72B3 (mod. 2011 and 2016) and the older T-72B (mod. 1985 and 1989). In the buildup to the invasion, Russian forces applied improvised steel grilles to the top of the turret, known as "cope cages" by some commentators. Military analysts have speculated that such grilles were added in an attempt to counter the usage of top-attack weapons, such as the US made FGM-148 Javelin and British-Swedish NLAW, by Ukrainian forces. These implementations add weight to the tank, increase its visual profile, and make it more difficult for the crew to escape from the tank. Analysts have also speculated that they may be potentially used as a countermeasure against RPG-7s fired from above during urban combat, loitering munitions, or against drone attacks, as a response to lessons learned from the 2020 Nagorno-Karabakh war. The lack of uniformity between the makeshift cage variants made from different meshes and iron fences suggest that they are largely improvised by the tank crews, and are not standard issue. In May 2022, some Russian tankers said they eventually removed the cages, as they obstructed the use of machine guns and radios, and prevented evacuation if the tank caught fire. As of February 2026, Russia has lost a total of 1,815 T-72s of all variants according to Oryx.

Before the invasion, Ukraine owned T-72s left from the Soviet Union but were partly modernized. These mainly included T-72As and T-72AVs, as well as modernized T-72AMTs (mod. 2017). On 3 April, an image of a rare T-72 "Ural" (1973) equipped with Kontakt-1 ERA having been damaged appeared. As of April 2022, an unspecified number of Czech T-72M1s had been provided to Ukraine. Poland also donated over 200 T-72M1/M1R tanks to Ukraine. As of February 2026, Ukraine has lost a total of 396 T-72s of all variants according to Oryx. 13 T-72 Ural, 121 T-72M/M1(R)s (96 destroyed, 5 damaged, 9 abandoned, and 11 captured), 31 T-72EAs (25 destroyed, 2 damaged, 3 abandoned, and 1 captured), 84 T-72AVs (65 destroyed, 2 damaged, 9 abandoned, and 8 captured), 28 T-72AMTs (18 destroyed, 1 damaged, 3 abandoned, and 7 captured), 59 T-72B (51 destroyed, 2 damaged, and 6 captured), 3 T-72AMT Zr.2022s (all destroyed), 12 of the PT-91 Twardy modernization (8 destroyed, 1 damaged, 3 abandoned), and 44 other T-72s of unclear model (42 destroyed, 2 damaged).

=== Combat history ===
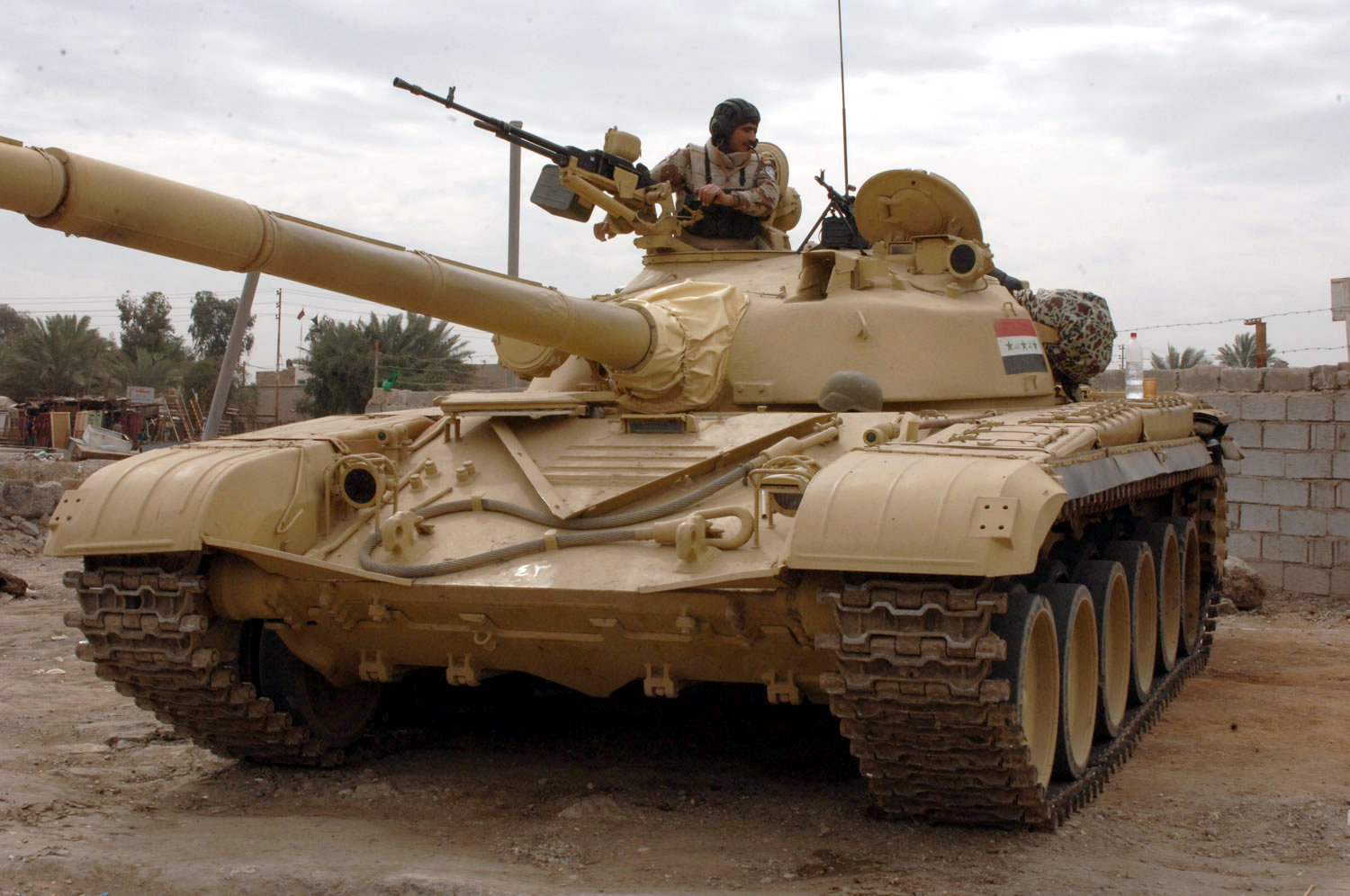
Iraqi T-72 in 2006

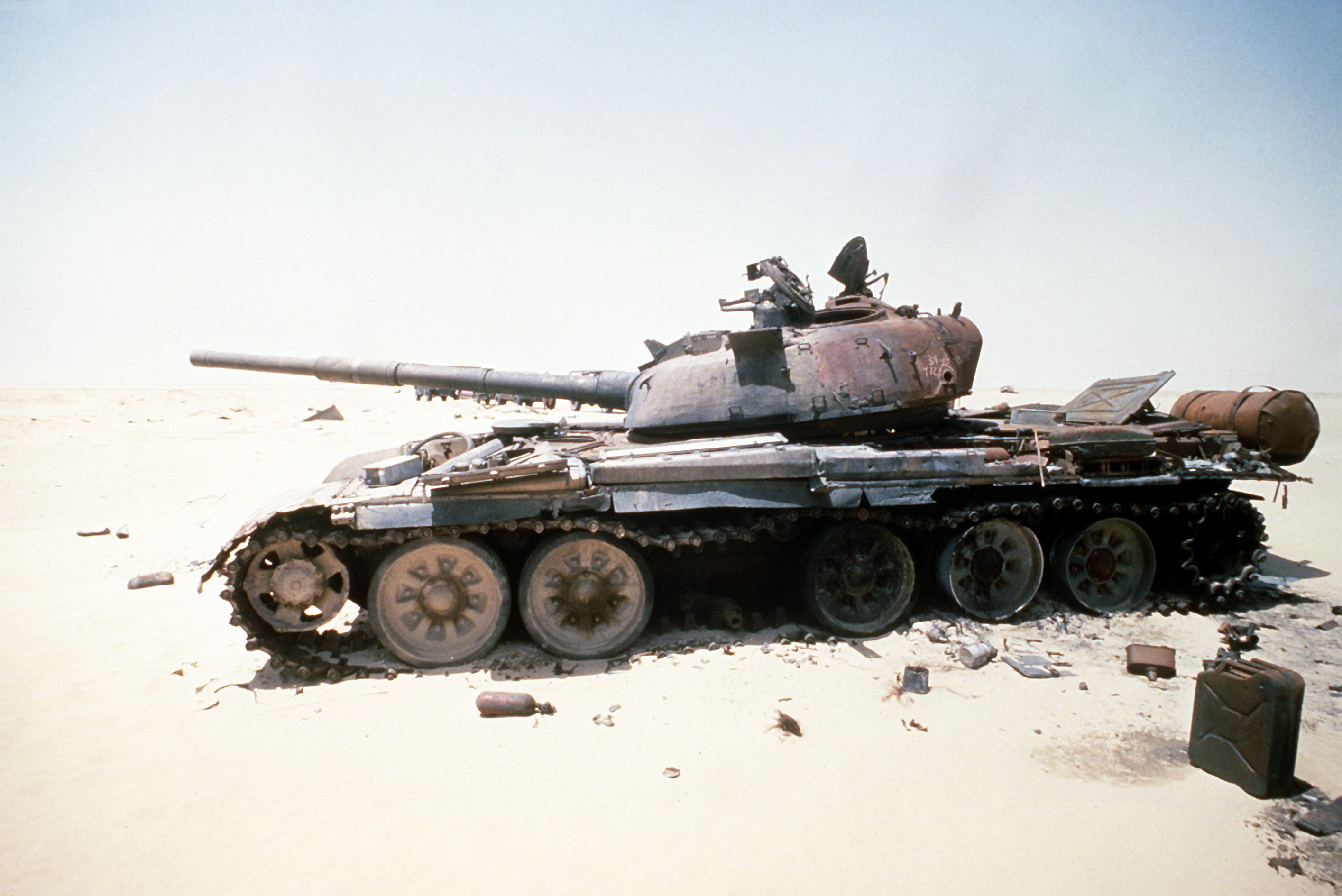
Iraqi 'Saddam' main battle tank destroyed in a Coalition attack during Operation Desert Storm

- 1980–1988: Iran–Iraq War (Iraq)
- 1982: Lebanon (Syria)
- 1987–1990: Sri Lankan Civil War (India)
- 1988–1994: First Nagorno-Karabakh War (Armenia and Azerbaijan)
- 1988–1993: Georgian Civil War (Georgia)
- 1990–1991: First Persian Gulf War (Iraq and Kuwait)
- 1990–2002: Sierra Leone Civil War (Executive Outcomes)
- 1991–2001: Yugoslav Wars (Yugoslavia)
  - 1991: Ten-Day War (Yugoslavia)
  - 1991–1995 Croatian War of Independence (Yugoslavia, Krajina Serbs, Croatia and Republika Srpska)
  - 1998: Kosovo War (Yugoslavia)
  - 2001: 2001 Macedonia conflict (Macedonia)
- 1991–2002: Algerian Civil War (Algeria)
- 1991: 1991 Iraqi uprisings (Iraq)
- 1991: August Coup (Soviet Union)
- 1992–1997: Civil war in Tajikistan (Russia and Tajikistan)
- 1994: Rwanda Civil War (Uganda)
- 1994–1996: First Chechen War (Russia and Chechnya (limited)) First known case of using tank-launched missiles, which effectively destroy targets at 4 km range.
- 1999–2009: Second Chechen War (Russia)
- 2003: Invasion of Iraq (Iraq)
- 2008: Russo-Georgian War (Russia and Georgia)
- 2011–2024: Syrian Civil War Government forces using T-72 tanks. Opposition forces using captured government's tanks.
- 2011: 2011 Libyan civil war (Gaddafi Government and Anti-Gaddafi forces)
- 2013–2020: South Sudanese Civil War
- 2014–present: Russo-Ukrainian War (Ukraine, Russia and pro-Russian separatists)
  - 2014: 2014 Pro-Russian unrest in Ukraine (Ukraine, pro-Russian separatists)
  - 2014: Annexation of Crimea (Russia)
  - 2014–2022: War in Donbas
  - 2022–present: Russian invasion of Ukraine (Russia and Ukraine)
- 2014–2017: War in Iraq (2013–2017) (Iraq)
- 2015: Boko Haram insurgency (Nigeria)
- 2016: 2016 Nagorno-Karabakh clashes (Armenia and Azerbaijan)
- 2020: Second Nagorno-Karabakh war (Armenia and Azerbaijan)
- 2020–2021: 2020–2021 China–India skirmishes (India)
- 2020–2022: Tigray War (Ethiopia and Tigray Defense Forces)
- 2022: 2022 Kyrgyzstan–Tajikistan clashes (Tajikistan)
- 2023: Sudanese civil war (2023–present) (Sudanese government forces)

== See also ==
- 125 mm smoothbore ammunition
- AT-8 Songster
- Tank machine gun type 95/98

== Sources ==
- Barabanov, M.S.; Lavrov, A.V.; Tseluiko, V.A. (2010), "The Tanks of August" ( (PDF)), in Pukhov, R.N. (ed.), Centre for Analysis of Strategies and Technologies, Moscow, ISBN 978-5-9902320-1-3, archived from the original on 2011-01-28
- Hunnicutt, R. P. (1984), Patton: A History of the American Main Battle Tank, Presidio Press, ISBN 0-89141-230-1
- Karpenko, A.V. (1996), Obozrenie otechestvennoĭ bronetankovoĭ tekhniki, 1905–1995 gg. (in Russian), Nevskij Bastion, OCLC 41871991
- Leizin, Uri (2004), Two myths of one battle: Syrian T-72's in 1982 Lebanon war (in Russian), archived from the original on 2008-09-15
- Sewell, Stephen "Cookie" (July–August 1998). "Why Three Tanks" (PDF). Armor. Vol. CVII, no. 4. Fort Knox, KY: U.S. Army Armor Center. pp. 21–29, 45. ISSN 0004-2420.
- Suvorov, Sergey (1993), ТАНК Т-72 ВЧЕРА, СЕГОДНЯ, ЗАВТРА (Tank T-72 Yesterday, Today, Tomorrow), ТанкоМастер
- Ustyantsev, Sergej Viktorovich; Kolmakov, Dmitrij Gennadevich (2004), Boyeviye mashiny Uralvagonzavoda. Tank T-72 (Combat vehicles of Uralvagonzavod. T-72 tank), Медиа-Принт, ISBN 5-98485-003-6
- Warford, James M. (July–August 1999). "Soviet-Russian Tank Turret Armor: The Cold War Shell-Game" (PDF). ARMOR. Vol. CIV, no. 4. Fort Knox, KY: US Army Armor Center. pp. 16–18. ISSN 0004-2420.
- Zaloga, Steven J (1993), T-72 Main Battle Tank 1974–93, Osprey Publishing, ISBN 1-85532-338-9
- Zaloga, Steven J (2009a), M1 Abrams vs T-72 Ural: Operation Desert Storm 1991, Osprey Publishing, ISBN 978-1846034077
- Zaloga, Steven J (2009b), T-80 Standard Tank, Great Britain: Osprey Publishing, ISBN 978-1-84603-244-8
- Zaloga, Steven J (2015), T-64 Battle Tank: The Cold War's Most Secret Tank, Osprey Publishing, ISBN 978-1-47280-629-1
- Then, Ryan A. (2024). T-72: The Definitive Guide to the Soviet Workhorse. Military History Group. ISBN 978-1-915453-21-1.
