= Leonid N. Kartsev =

Russian major general (1922–2013)

- Citizenship: Soviet Union → Russia

Leonid Nikolaevich Kartsev (July 21, 1922 – April 13, 2013) was a Soviet major general. From 1953 to 1969 he was chief designer of the Uralvagonzavod (UVZ) tank design bureau in Nizhny Tagil, in Russia. He was responsible for the development of the T-55, T-62 and T-72.

== Early life ==
Leonid Nikolaevich Kartsev was born in Skormovo, Gavrilovo-Posadsky District, Russia, on 21 July 1922. There is a T-62 memorial to Kartsev in Skormovo.

== Uralvagonzavod tank design bureau ==
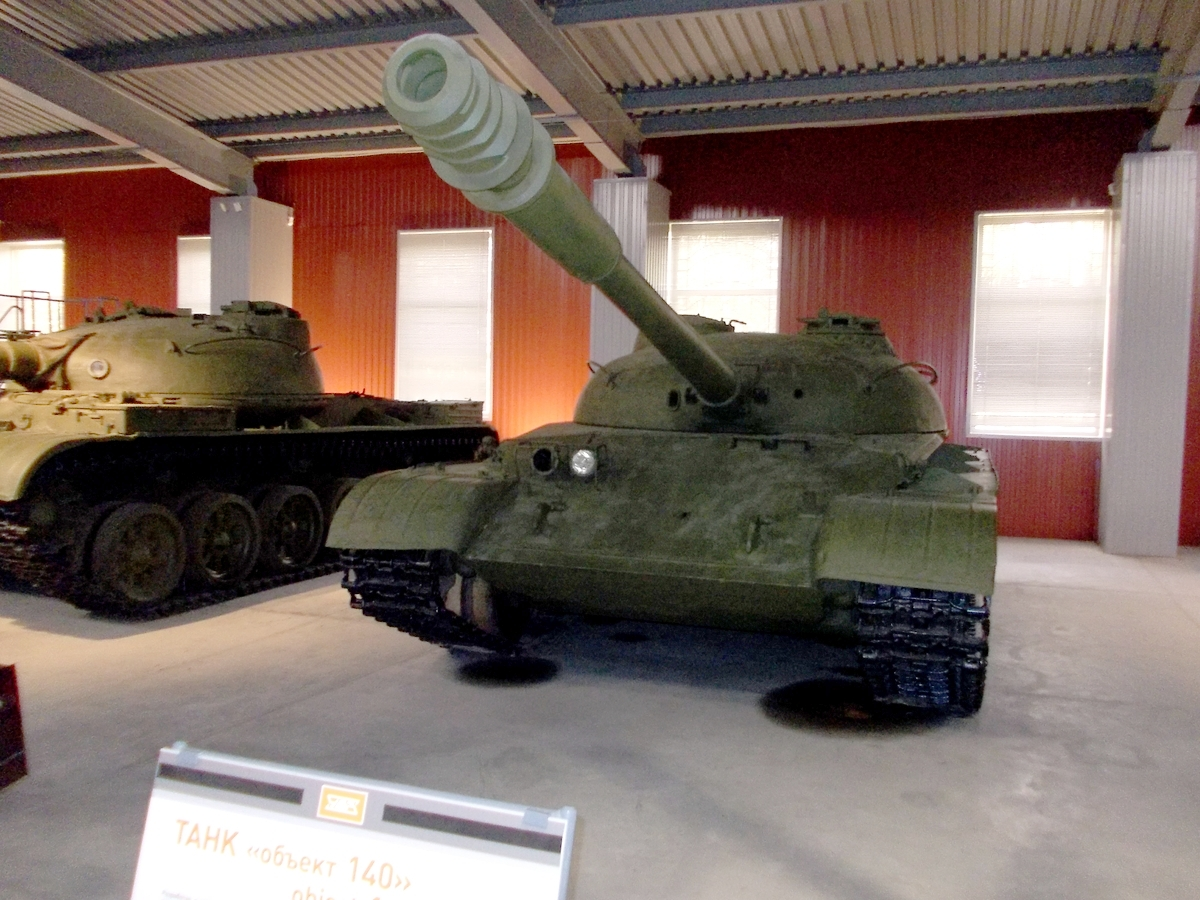
Obiekt 140 at the Kubinka Tank Museum, The turret was the basis for the T-62

After engineering school Kartsev began working at UVZ in December 1949 under Aleksandr Morozov. This relationship has been described as "cordial" and Kartsev and Morozov both shared contempt for fellow tank engineer Josef Kotin of Kirov. Morozov left to lead the tank design bureau in Karkov in 1951, taking many of his engineers with him. Kartsev was promoted to Section 520 chief designer in 1953 days before the death of Joseph Stalin. After his promotion Kartsev was approached by the NKVD and told to hand over his jewish workers. Kartsev refused. The conflict was resolved following a coup led by Nikita Khrushchev that removed Lavrentiy Beria from power.

One of Kartsev's first projects as lead tank designer was to improve upon the T-54. Kartsev merged numerous incremental T-54 upgrade projects into one project called Obiekt 155. The result was the more successful T-55 which went into full production in January 1958.

The Military-Industrial Commission (VPK) authorized work on two alternative engines for a wartime T-64, a so-called "mobilization model" that could be produced more quickly and at half the cost.

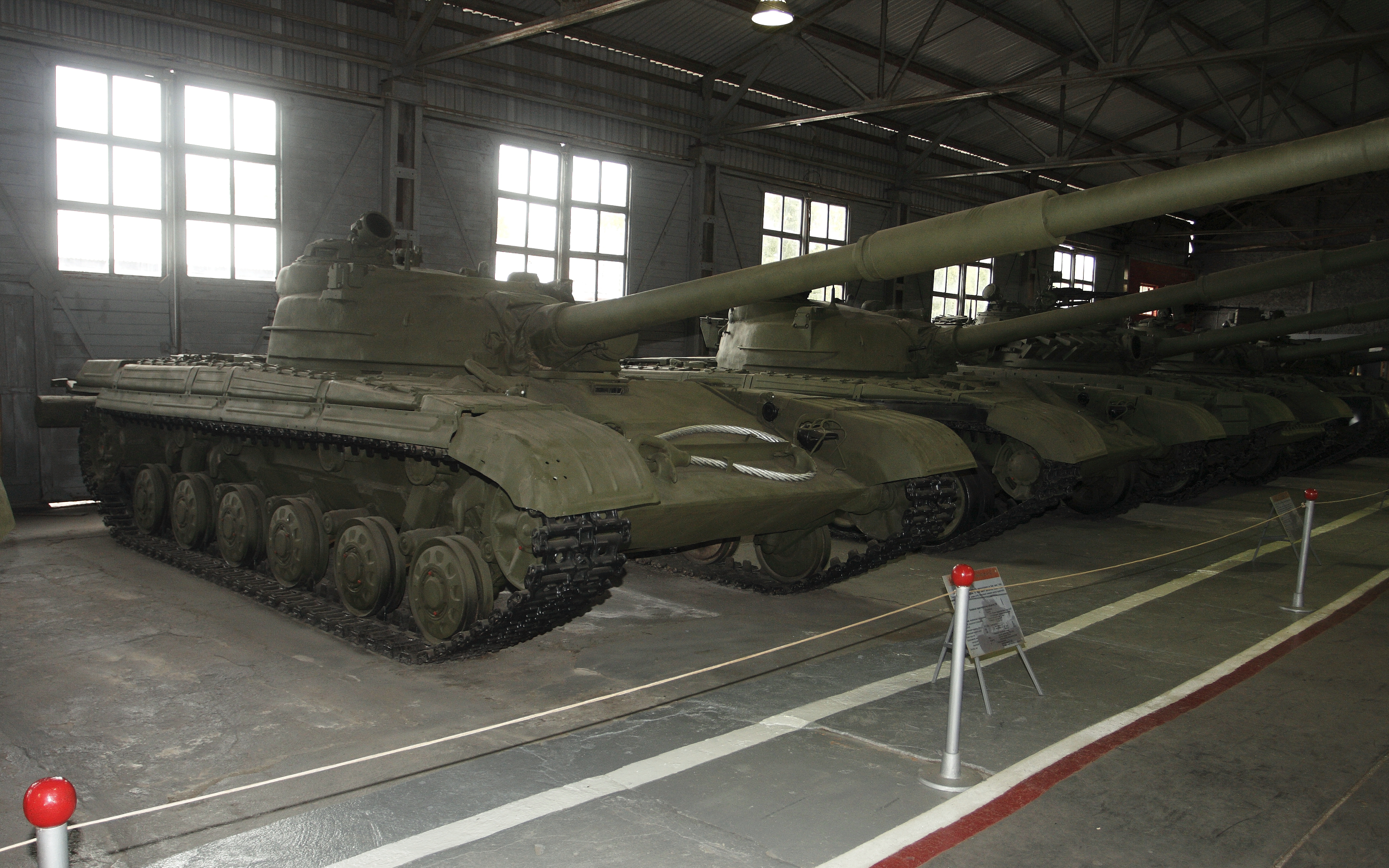
Object 172 at the Kubinka Tank Museum.

GABTU sent a T-64A prototype with a team to Uralvagonzavod. Kartsev was to lead this team.

Kartsev was unsatisfied with the innovations of the T-64, and began instead a more comprehensive project to redesign the tank. Kartsev melded what he believed were the best aspects of the T-64A, Object 167, and an upgunned T-62.

During development the tank was code-named "Ural" after the Ural mountain region. Uralvagonzavod produced the first prototype with a T-62 turret, D-81 125-mm gun and V-45 engine in January 1968. Ob. 439 differed so greatly from the T-64 that it was redesignated as "Object 172".

Kartsev's defiance angered GABTU, which initially reprimanded him for his insubordination. However, after the tank proved indeed to possess potential as a less costly alternative to the T-64, Kartsev was allowed to continue work on his design. Politically motivated opposition continued to beset the tank throughout its development. Vagonka tank plant manager I.F. Krutyakov sought to subordinate Uralvagonzavod under Josef Kotin. Kartsev skillfully beat back this play for power, embarrassing Krutyakov in the process. Kartsev retired in August 1969, and was succeeded by Venediktov.

== Decorations and awards ==
  - Soviet Union:
  - - 1966
  - - 1985
  - - 1944
- Russia:
  - - 2012

== Bibliography ==
- Kinnear, James; Sewell, Stephen L. (Cookie) (11 May 2021). Soviet T-62 Main Battle Tank. Osprey Publishing. ISBN 978-1472848222.
- Sewell, Stephen "Cookie" (July–August 1998). "Why Three Tanks" (PDF). Armor. CVII (4). Fort Knox, KY: U.S. Army Armor Center: 21–29, 45. ISSN 0004-2420. Archived from the original (PDF) on September 7, 2023.
- Zaloga, Steven J. (1993). T-72 Main Battle Tank 1974-93. Oxford, United Kingdom: Osprey. ISBN 978-1-85532-338-4.
- Zaloga, Steven J. (2015). Armored Champion: The Top Tanks of World War II. Stackpole. ISBN 978-0811714372.
