= Obiekt 140 =

Soviet experimental medium tank

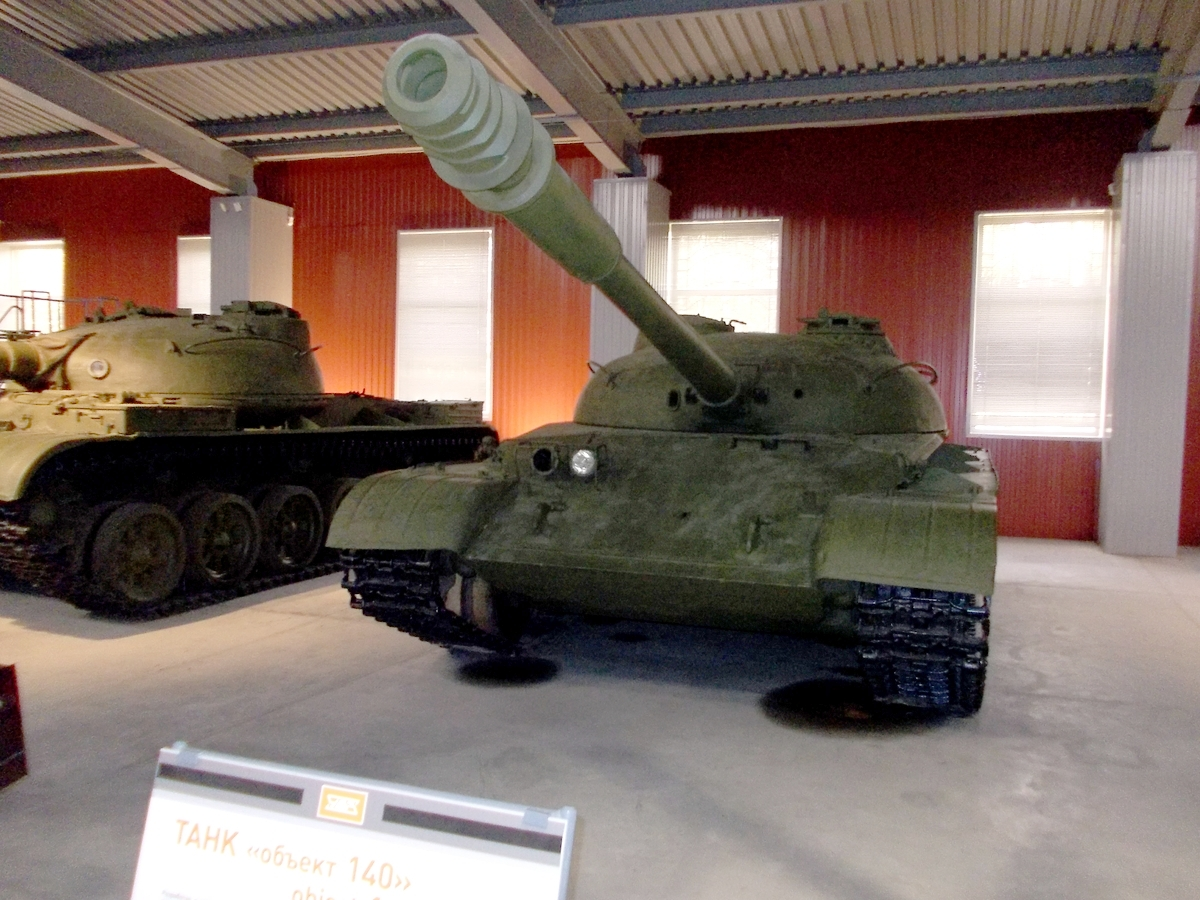
- Complete Obiekt 140
- Type: Experimental Medium Tank
- Place of origin: Soviet Russia

Service history
- Used by: USSR

Production history
- Designed: 1953–1958
- Manufacturer: Nizhny Tagil
- No. built: 2

Specifications
- Mass: 36 tons
- Crew: 4
- Armor: 55–240 mm
- Main armament: 100 mm U-8TS tank gun
- Engine: Model TD-12; 580 hp
- Power/weight: 16.1 hp/ton
- Maximum speed: 55 km/h

The Obiekt 140, or Object 140, was a prototype medium tank developed from 1953 to 1958 in Nizhny Tagil, Russia to replace the T-54 medium tank. Two prototypes were completed before the project was cancelled in 1958 in favor of the Object 430 Project, which would become the T-64. Several features of the Object 140 design would find their way into the T-55 and T-62 designs.

== History ==
At the time when Morozov was working on his Object 430 tank, a young engineer, Leonid N. Kartsev, was the head of the OKB-520 design bureau of Uralvagonzavod factory (UVZ) in Nizhny Tagil. He was responsible for the T-54A (Object 137G) and T-54B (Object 137G2) modernizations of T-54 main battle tank. After work on the T-54M (Object 139) modernization was abandoned he and his design team started working on a new tank, called Object 140. The new tank had a suspension with six light road wheels made of aluminum. The turret was cast and armed with a 100 mm D-54TS tank gun with the Molniya two-plane stabilization system. The tank carried 50 rounds. The chief designer of the legendary V-2 diesel engine, Ivan Trashutin refused to modify the engine to demanded 580hp specification, so Kartsev turned to Barnaul engine plants chief designer Evgeny Artiemejev. The plant manufactured V-series engines for agricultural and other domestic applications. Artiemejev received the idea well and agreed to develop the 580hp version.

After initial prototypes were completed, the weight stood at 36.5t, a half ton over the design specification. Kartsev choose to work the weight down for real, instead of hiding it to the paperwork (a usual procedure among designers of the era). To overcome this, aluminum roadwheels and an aluminum engine cover were introduced among other minor modifications. The engine was turned on its lap to the bottom of the hull, a solution which reduced the height of the engine compartment but caused further modifications to the engine and considerably complicated maintenance.

In 1957 Uralvagonzavod built two Object 140 prototypes which were put on trials soon after. In his memoirs Kartsev recalled that during assembly and factory tests he became more and more aware that the tank was unjustifiably complicated, difficult to operate and repair. Only one plant in the whole Soviet Union was able to cast some of the necessary plates, and specific parts on the engine compartment were not serially producible at all. Kartsev mentions that his engineers needed to use a dentist mirror to install exhaust collectors from a hatch below the tank. After few sleepless nights, Kartsev decided to write a letter himself to the Central Committee, and demand the cancellation of the project. To his surprise, he was agreed and not even punished for wasting 16 million rubles of public money on the project.

Whilst still feeling moral guilt from his failure, he started working on yet another T-54 main battle tank modernization called the T-55 (Object 155) in which he included one of the key innovations from his Object 140 tank: the upper fuel tanks were fitted with mounts for tank gun ammunition. This increased the ammunition load carried by the tank to 45 rounds. The aluminum roadwheels designed for the Object 140 later made it to the T-72 tank.

== Bibliography ==
- Kinnear, James L. & Sewell, Stephen (2019). Soviet T-55 Main Battle Tank. Oxford: Osprey Publishing. ISBN 978-1-4728-3855-1.
