= Tank =

Tracked heavy armoured fighting vehicle

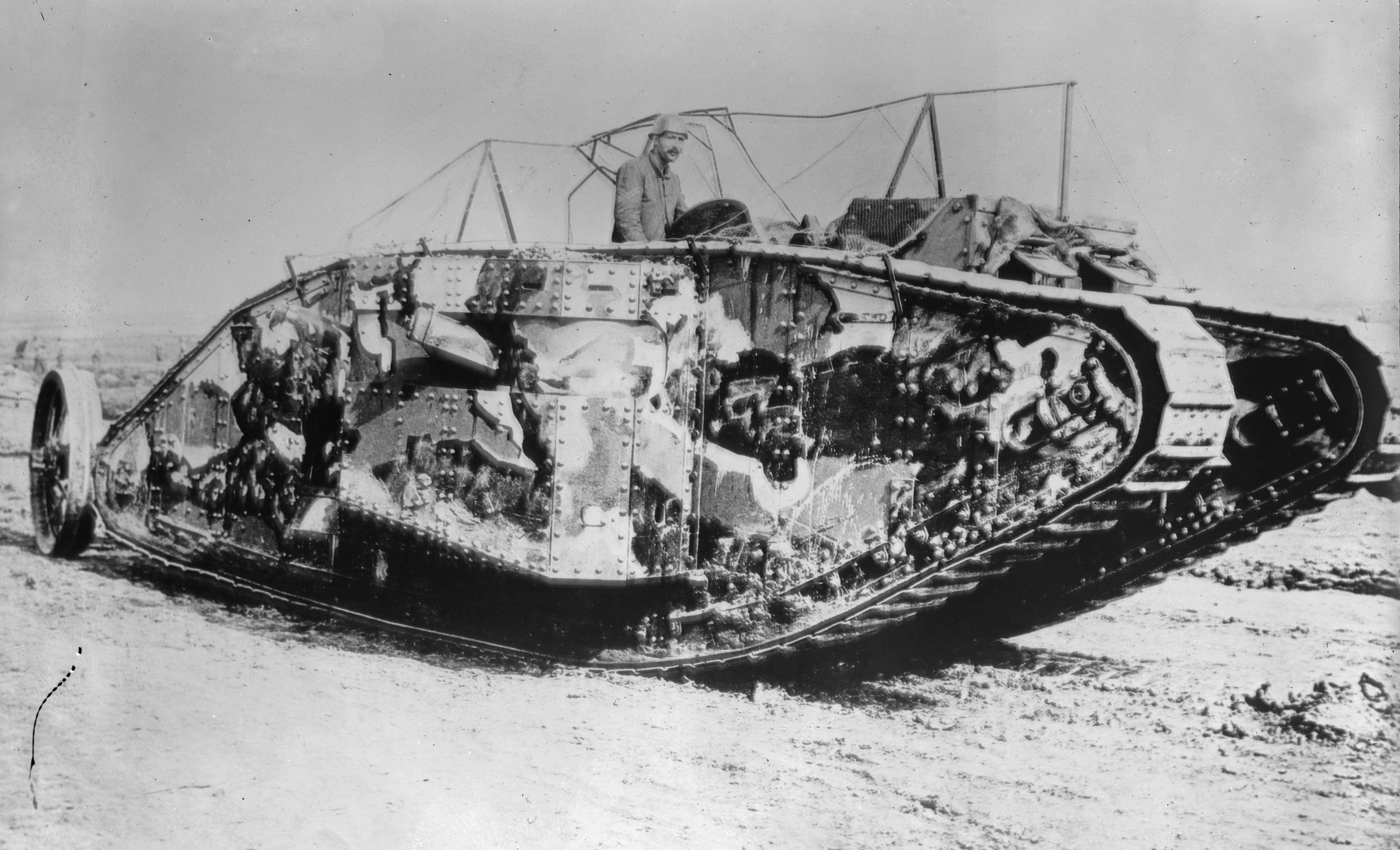
The first tank to engage in battle, the British Mark I tank (pictured in 1916) with the Solomon camouflage scheme

A tank is an armoured fighting vehicle intended as a primary offensive weapon in front-line ground combat. Tank designs are a balance of heavy firepower, strong armour, and battlefield mobility provided by tracks and a powerful engine; their main armament is often mounted within a turret. They are a mainstay of modern 20th and 21st century ground forces and a key part of combined arms combat.

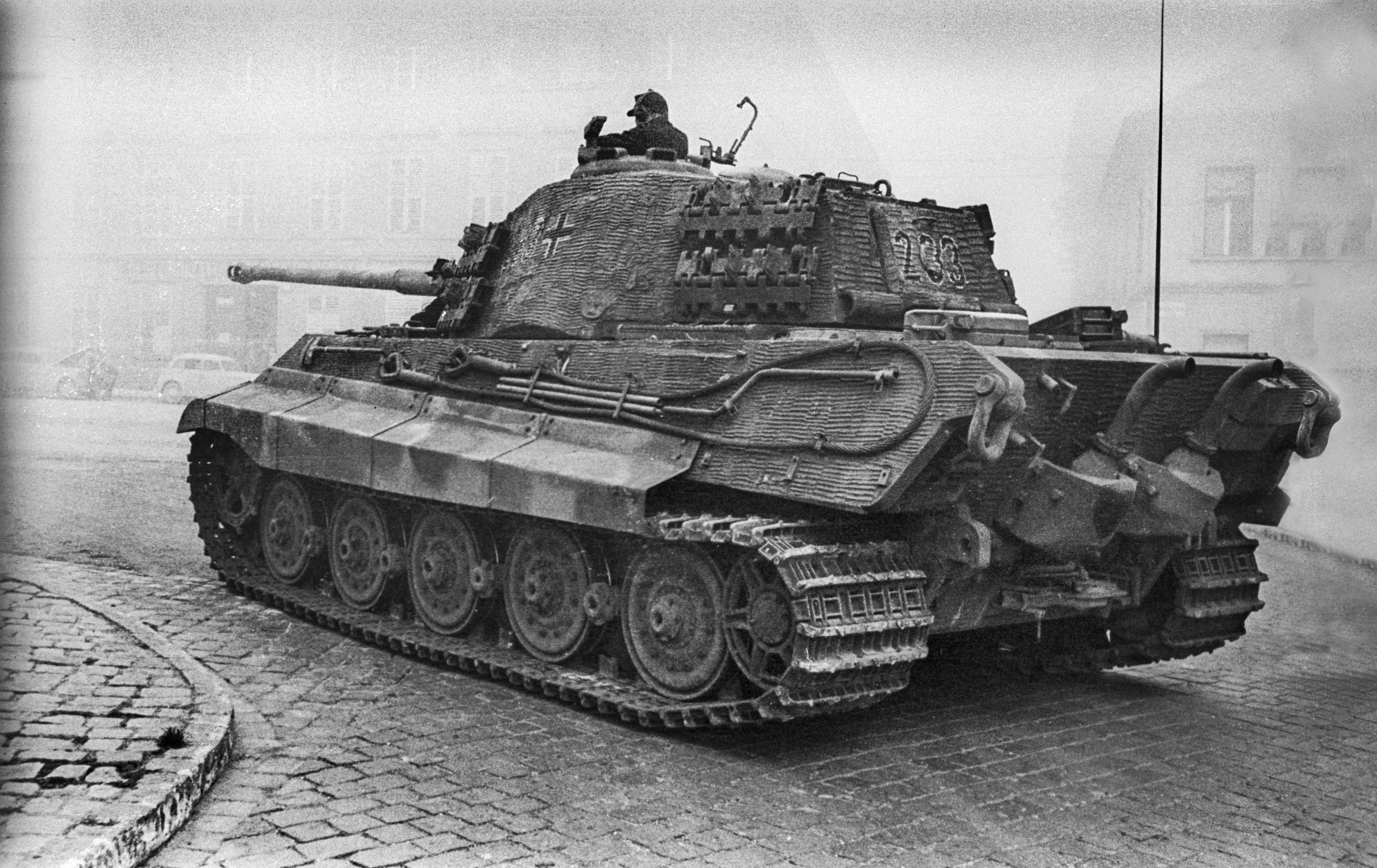
German tank Pz.Kpfw. VI Ausf. B "Tiger II" (223)

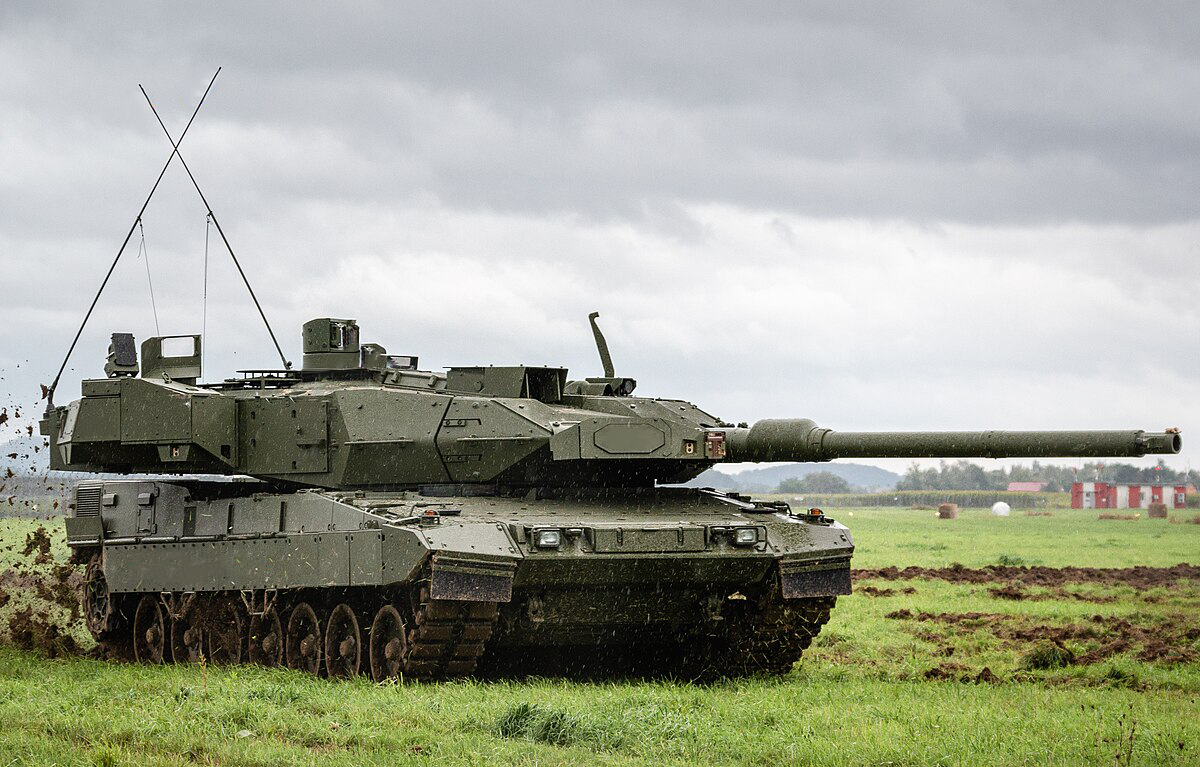
Leopard 2A8 tank (KMW)

Modern tanks are versatile mobile land weapons platforms whose main armament is a large-calibre tank gun mounted in a rotating gun turret, supplemented by machine guns or other ranged weapons such as anti-tank guided missiles or rocket launchers. They have heavy vehicle armour which provides protection for the crew, the vehicle's munition storage, fuel tank and propulsion systems. The use of tracks rather than wheels provides improved operational mobility which allows the tank to overcome rugged terrain and adverse conditions such as mud and ice/snow better than wheeled vehicles, and thus be more flexibly positioned at advantageous locations on the battlefield. These features enable the tank to perform in a variety of intense combat situations, simultaneously both offensively (with direct fire from their powerful main gun) and defensively (as fire support and defilade for friendly troops due to the near invulnerability to common infantry small arms and good resistance against heavier weapons, although anti-tank weapons used in 2022, some of them man-portable, have demonstrated the ability to destroy older generations of tanks with single shots), all while maintaining the mobility needed to exploit changing tactical situations. Fully integrating tanks into modern military forces spawned a new era of combat called armoured warfare.

Until the invention of the main battle tank, tanks were typically categorized either by weight class (ultralight, light, medium, heavy or super-heavy tanks) or doctrinal purpose (breakthrough, cavalry, infantry, cruiser, antinfantry, antitank, operational, qualitative reinforcement, combined arms, special operations, or reconnaissance tanks). Some are larger and more thickly armoured and with large guns, while others are smaller, lightly armoured, and equipped with a smaller calibre and lighter gun. These smaller tanks move over terrain with speed and agility and can perform a reconnaissance role in addition to engaging hostile targets. The smaller, faster tank would not normally engage in battle with a larger, heavily armoured tank, except during a surprise flanking manoeuvre.

== Etymology ==
The word tank was first applied in a military context to British "landships" in 1915 to keep their nature secret before they entered service.

=== Origins ===
On 24 December 1915, a meeting took place at the Inter-Departmental Conference (including representatives of the Director of Naval Construction's Committee, the Admiralty, the Ministry of Munitions, and the War Office). Its purpose was to discuss the progress of the plans for what were described as "Caterpillar Machine Gun Destroyers or Land Cruisers." In his autobiography, Albert Gerald Stern (Secretary to the Landship Committee, later head of the Mechanical Warfare Supply Department) says that at that meeting:

Mr. (Thomas J.) Macnamara (M.P., and Parliamentary and Financial Secretary to the Admiralty) then suggested, for secrecy's sake, to change the title of the Landship Committee. Mr. d'Eyncourt agreed that it was very desirable to retain secrecy by all means, and proposed to refer to the vessel as a "Water Carrier". In Government offices, committees and departments are always known by their initials. For this reason I, as Secretary, considered the proposed title totally unsuitable. (Note: The initials W.C. are a British abbreviation for a water closet; in other words, a toilet. However, later in the War, a number of Mk IV Tanks were fitted with grapnels to remove barbed wire. They were designated "Wire Cutters" and had the large letters "W.C." painted on their rear armour.) In our search for a synonymous term, we changed the word "Water Carrier" to "Tank," and became the "Tank Supply" or "T.S." Committee. That is how these weapons came to be called Tanks.

He incorrectly added, "and the name has now been adopted by all countries in the world."

Lieutenant-Colonel Ernest Swinton, who was secretary to the meeting, says that he was instructed to find a non-committal word when writing his report of the proceedings. In the evening he discussed it with a fellow officer, Lt-Col Walter Dally Jones, and they chose the word "tank". "That night, in the draft report of the conference, the word 'tank' was employed in its new sense for the first time." Swinton's Notes on the Employment of Tanks, in which he uses the word throughout, was published in January 1916.

In July 1918, Popular Science Monthly reported:

Because a fellow of the Royal Historical Society* has unintentionally misled the British public as to the origin of the famous "tanks", Sir William Tritton, who designed and built them, has published the real story of their name ... Since it was obviously inadvisable to herald "Little Willie's" reason for existence to the world he was known as the "Instructional Demonstration Unit." "Little Willie's" hull was called in the shop orders a "water carrier for Mesopotamia"; no one knew that the hull was intended to be mounted on a truck. Naturally, the water carrier began to be called a "tank". So the name came to be used by managers and foremen of the shop, until now it has a place in the army vocabulary and will probably be so known in history for all time.

(*F.J. Gardiner, F.R.Hist.S.)

D'Eyncourt's account differs from Swinton's and Tritton's:

... when the future arrangements were under discussion for transporting the first landships to France a question arose as to how, from a security point of view, the consignment should be labelled. To justify their size we decided to call them 'water-carriers for Russia' —the idea being that they should be taken for some new method of taking water to forward troops in the battle areas. Lt.-Col. Swinton ... raised a humorous objection to this, remarking that the War Office pundits would probably contract the description to 'W.C.'s for Russia', and that we had better forestall this by merely labelling the packages 'Tanks'. So tanks they became, and tanks they have remained."

This appears to be an imperfect recollection. He says that the name problem arose "when we shipped the first two vehicles to France the following year" (August 1916), but by that time the name "tank" had been in use for eight months. The tanks were labelled "With Care to Petrograd," but the belief was encouraged that they were a type of snowplough.

=== International ===
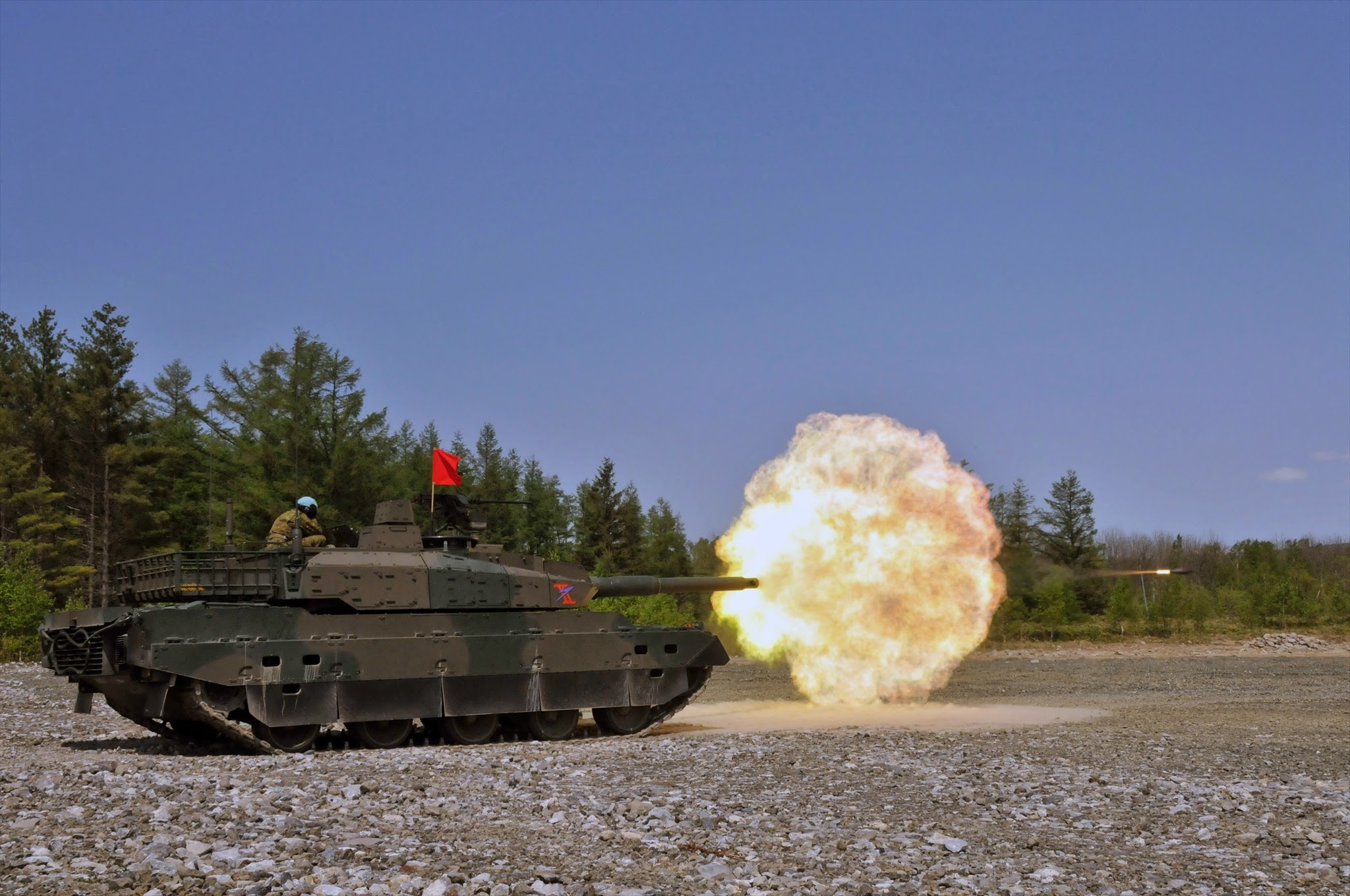
A Japanese Type 10 firing.

The term "tank" is used throughout the English-speaking world, but other countries use different terminology. In France, the second country to use tanks in battle, the word tank or tanque was adopted initially, but was then, largely at the insistence of Colonel J.B.E. Estienne, rejected in favour of char d'assaut ("assault vehicle") or simply char ("vehicle"). During World War I, German sources tended to refer to British tanks as tanks and to their own as Kampfwagen. Later, tanks became referred to as "Panzer" (lit. 'armour'), a shortened form of the full term "Panzerkampfwagen", literally "armoured fighting vehicle". In Arabic, tanks are called Dabbāba. The same word is used in Turoyo (a western dialect of Aramaic), but Swadaya, an eastern dialect, uses rashupta instead. In Italian, a tank is a "carro armato" (lit. 'armed wagon'). Norway uses the term stridsvogn and Sweden the similar stridsvagn (lit. 'battle wagon', also used for chariots), whereas Denmark uses kampvogn (lit. 'fight wagon'). Finland uses panssarivaunu (armoured wagon), although tankki is also used colloquially. The Polish name czołg, derived from verb czołgać się ("to crawl"), is used, depicting the vehicle's movement and its speed. In Hungarian, the tank is called harckocsi (combat wagon), albeit tank is also common. In Japanese, the term sensha (戦車, lit. "battle vehicle") is taken from Chinese and used, and this term is likewise borrowed into Korean as jeoncha (전차/戰車); more recent Chinese literature uses the English-derived 坦克 tǎnkè (tank) as opposed to 戰車 zhànchē (battle vehicle) used in earlier days.

== Development overview ==
The modern tank is the result of a century of development from the first primitive armoured vehicles, due to improvements in technology such as the internal combustion engine, which allowed the rapid movement of heavy armoured vehicles. As a result of these advances, tanks underwent tremendous shifts in capability in the years since their first appearance. Tanks in World War I were developed separately and simultaneously by Great Britain and France as a means to break the deadlock of trench warfare on the Western Front. The first British prototype, nicknamed Little Willie, was constructed at William Foster & Co. in Lincoln, England in 1915, with leading roles played by Major Walter Gordon Wilson who designed the gearbox and hull, and by William Tritton of William Foster & Co., who designed the track plates. This was a prototype of a new design that would become the British Army's Mark I tank, the first tank used in combat in September 1916 during the Battle of the Somme. The name "tank" was adopted by the British during the early stages of their development, as a security measure to conceal their purpose (see etymology). While the British and French built thousands of tanks in World War I, Germany was unconvinced of the tank's potential, and did not have enough resources, thus it built only twenty.

Tanks of the interwar period evolved into the much larger and more powerful designs of World War II. Important new concepts of armoured warfare were developed; the Soviet Union launched the first mass tank/air attack at Khalkhin Gol (Nomonhan) in August 1939 against the Japanese forces based there, and later developed the T-34, one of the predecessors of the main battle tank. Less than two weeks later, Germany began their large-scale armoured campaigns that would become known as blitzkrieg ("lightning war") – massed concentrations of tanks combined with motorised and mechanised infantry, artillery and air power designed to break through the enemy front and collapse enemy resistance.

The widespread introduction of high-explosive anti-tank warheads during the second half of World War II led to lightweight infantry-carried anti-tank weapons such as the Panzerfaust, which could destroy some types of tanks. Tanks in the Cold War were designed with these weapons in mind, and led to greatly improved armour types during the 1960s, especially composite armour. Improved engines, transmissions and suspensions allowed tanks of this period to grow larger. Aspects of gun technology changed significantly as well, with advances in shell design and aiming technology.

During the Cold War, the main battle tank concept arose and became a key component of modern armies. In the 21st century, with the increasing role of asymmetrical warfare and the end of the Cold War, that also contributed to the increase of cost-effective anti-tank rocket propelled grenades (RPGs) worldwide and its successors, the ability of tanks to operate independently has declined. Modern tanks are more frequently organized into combined arms units which involve the support of infantry, who may accompany the tanks in infantry fighting vehicles, and supported by reconnaissance or ground-attack aircraft.

== History ==
=== 20th-century ===
==== Conceptions ====
The tank is the 20th-century realisation of an ancient concept: that of providing troops with mobile protection and firepower. The internal combustion engine, armour plate, and continuous track were key innovations leading to the invention of the modern tank.

During the 119 BC Battle of Mobei of the Han–Xiongnu War, the Han general Wei Qing led his army through a fatiguing expeditionary march across the Gobi desert only to find Yizhixie chanyu's main force waiting to encircle them on the other side. Using armoured heavy wagons known as "Wu Gang Wagon" (Chinese: 武剛車) in ring formations that provided Chinese archers, crossbowmen and infantry protection from the Xiongnu's powerful cavalry charges, and allowed Han troops to utilise their ranged weapons' advantages of precision. This forced a stalemate and allowed time for his troops to recover strength, before using the cover of a sandstorm to launch a counteroffensive which overran the nomads.

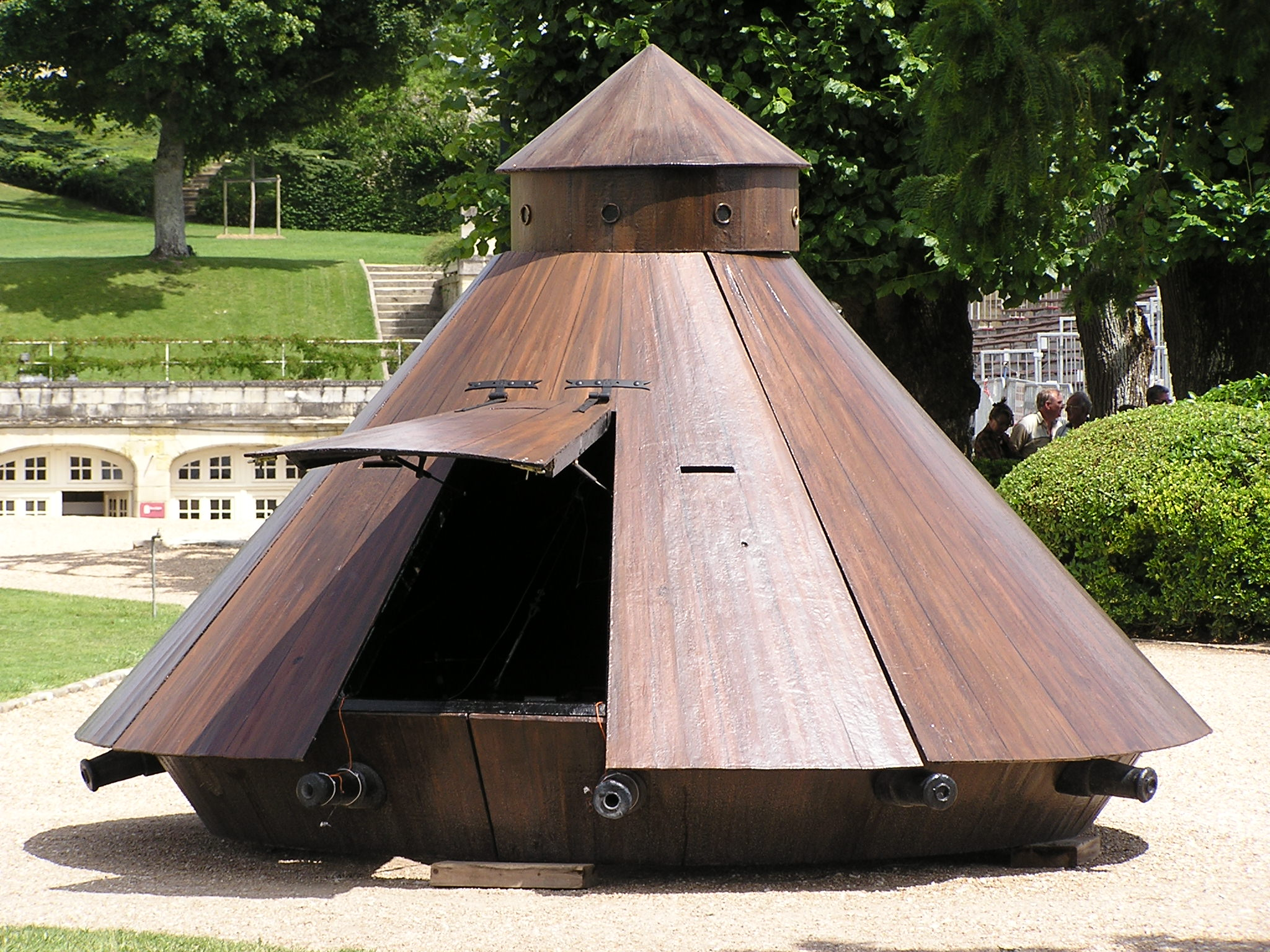
A scale model of Leonardo da Vinci's fighting vehicle.

In the 15th century, Jan Žižka built armoured wagons known as 'Wagenburg' containing cannons and used them effectively in several battles during the Hussite-wars.

While some sources claim or imply that Leonardo da Vinci invented the tank, his late-15th-century drawings of armoured vehicles were never built and would have been impractical. These human-powered, wheeled vehicles with cannons would have been difficult for humans to move by themselves and use of animals inside their hulls would have been problematic.

Continuous track, rather than conventional wheels, arose from attempts to improve the mobility of wheeled vehicles by spreading their weight, reducing ground pressure, and increasing their traction. Experiments can be traced back as far as the 17th century, and by the late nineteenth they existed in various recognisable and practical forms in several countries.

It is frequently claimed that Richard Lovell Edgeworth created a caterpillar track. It is true that in 1770 he patented a "machine, that should carry and lay down its own road", but this was Edgeworth's choice of words. His own account in his autobiography is of a horse-drawn wooden carriage on eight retractable legs, capable of lifting itself over high walls. The description bears no similarity to a caterpillar track. Armoured trains appeared in the mid-19th century, and various armoured steam and petrol-engined vehicles were also proposed.

The machines described in H. G. Wells's 1903 short story The Land Ironclads are a step closer, insofar as they are armour-plated, have an internal power plant, and are able to cross trenches. Some aspects of the story foresee the tactical use and impact of the tanks that later came into being. However, Wells's vehicles were driven by steam and moved on pedrail wheels, technologies that were already outdated at the time of writing. After seeing British tanks in 1916, Wells denied having "invented" them, writing, "Yet let me state at once that I was not their prime originator. I took up an idea, manipulated it slightly, and handed it on." It is, though, possible that one of the British tank pioneers, Ernest Swinton, was subconsciously or otherwise influenced by Wells's tale.

The first combinations of the three principal components of the tank appeared in the decade before World War One. In 1903, Captain Léon René Levavasseur of the French artillery proposed mounting a field gun in an armoured box on tracks. Major William E. Donohue, of the British Army's Mechanical Transport Committee, suggested fixing a gun and armoured shield on a British type of track-driven vehicle. The first armoured car was produced in Austria in 1904. However, all were restricted to rails or reasonably passable terrain. It was the development of a practical caterpillar track that provided the necessary independent, all-terrain mobility.

In a memorandum of 1908, Antarctic explorer Robert Falcon Scott presented his view that man-hauling to the South Pole was impossible and that motor traction was needed. Snow vehicles did not yet exist, however, and so his engineer Reginald Skelton developed the idea of a caterpillar track for snow surfaces. These tracked motors were built by the Wolseley Tool and Motor Car Company in Birmingham and tested in Switzerland and Norway, and can be seen in action in Herbert Ponting's 1911 documentary film of Scott's Antarctic Terra Nova Expedition. Scott died during the expedition in 1912, but expedition member and biographer Apsley Cherry-Garrard credited Scott's "motors" with the inspiration for the British World War I tanks, writing: "Scott never knew their true possibilities; for they were the direct ancestors of the 'tanks' in France".

In 1911, a Lieutenant Engineer in the Austrian Army, Günther Burstyn, presented to the Austrian and Prussian War Ministries plans for a light, three-man tank with a gun in a revolving turret, the so-called Burstyn-Motorgeschütz. In the same year an Australian civil engineer named Lancelot de Mole submitted a basic design for a tracked, armoured vehicle to the British War Office. In Russia, Vasiliy Mendeleev designed a tracked vehicle containing a large naval gun. All of these ideas were rejected and, by 1914, forgotten (although it was officially acknowledged after the war that de Mole's design was at least the equal to the initial British tanks). Various individuals continued to contemplate the use of tracked vehicles for military applications, but by the outbreak of the War no one in a position of responsibility in any army seems to have given much thought to tanks.

==== World War I ====
Film clip of World War I-era British tank.

===== United Kingdom =====
The direct military impact of the tank can be debated but its effect on the Germans was immense, it caused bewilderment, terror and concern in equal measure. It was also a huge boost to the civilians at home. After facing the Zeppelins, at last Britain had a wonder weapon. Tanks were taken on tours and treated almost like film stars.

— David Willey, curator at The Tank Museum, Bovington.

From late 1914 a small number of middle-ranking British Army officers tried to persuade the War Office and the Government to consider the creation of armoured vehicles. Amongst their suggestions was the use of caterpillar tractors, but although the Army used many such vehicles for towing heavy guns, it could not be persuaded that they could be adapted as armoured vehicles. The consequence was that early tank development in the United Kingdom was carried out by the Royal Navy.

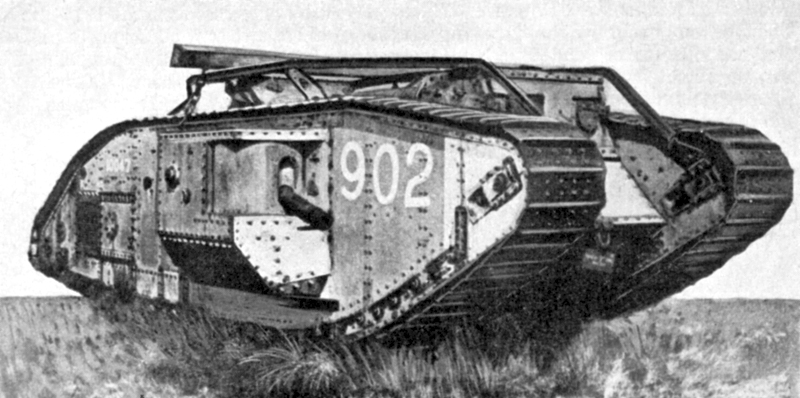
British World War I Mark V tank

As the result of an approach by Royal Naval Air Service officers who had been operating armoured cars on the Western Front, the First Lord of the Admiralty, Winston Churchill, formed the Landship Committee, on 20 February 1915. The Director of Naval Construction for the Royal Navy, Eustace Tennyson d'Eyncourt, was appointed to head the Committee in view of his experience with the engineering methods it was felt might be required; the two other members were naval officers, and a number of industrialists were engaged as consultants. So many played a part in its long and complicated development that it is not possible to name any individual as the sole inventor of the tank.

However leading roles were played by Lt Walter Gordon Wilson R.N. who designed the gearbox and developed practical tracks and by William Tritton whose agricultural machinery company, William Foster & Co. in Lincoln, Lincolnshire, England built the prototypes. On 22 July 1915, a commission was placed to design a machine that could cross a trench 4 ft wide. Secrecy surrounded the project with the designers locking themselves in a room at the White Hart Hotel in Lincoln. The committee's first design, Little Willie, ran for the first time in September 1915 and served to develop the form of the track but an improved design, better able to cross trenches, swiftly followed and in January 1916 the prototype, nicknamed "Mother", was adopted as the design for future tanks. The first order for tanks was placed on 12 February 1916, and a second on 21 April. Fosters built 37 (all "male"), and Metropolitan Railway Carriage and Wagon Company, of Birmingham, 113 (38 "male" and 75 "female"), a total of 150. Production models of "Male" tanks (armed with naval cannon and machine guns) and "Females" (carrying only machine-guns) would go on to fight in history's first tank action at the Somme in September 1916. Great Britain produced about 2,600 tanks of various types during the war. The first tank to engage in battle was designated D1, a British Mark I Male, during the Battle of Flers-Courcelette (part of the wider Somme offensive) on 15 September 1916. Bert Chaney, a nineteen-year-old signaller with the 7th London Territorial Battalion, reported that "three huge mechanical monsters such as [he] had never seen before" rumbled their way onto the battlefield, "frightening the Jerries out of their wits and making them scuttle like frightened rabbits." When the news of the first use of the tanks emerged, Prime Minister David Lloyd George commented,

It is really to Mr Winston Churchill that the credit is due more than to anyone else. He took up with enthusiasm the idea of making them a long time ago, and he met with many difficulties. He converted me, and at the Ministry of Munitions he went ahead and made them. The admiralty experts were invaluable, and gave the greatest possible assistance. They are, of course, experts in the matter of armour plating. Major Stern, (formerly an officer in the Royal Naval Air Service) a business man at the Ministry of Munitions had charge of the work of getting them built, and he did the task very well. Col Swinton and others also did valuable work.

— David Lloyd George, 19 September 1916.

===== France =====
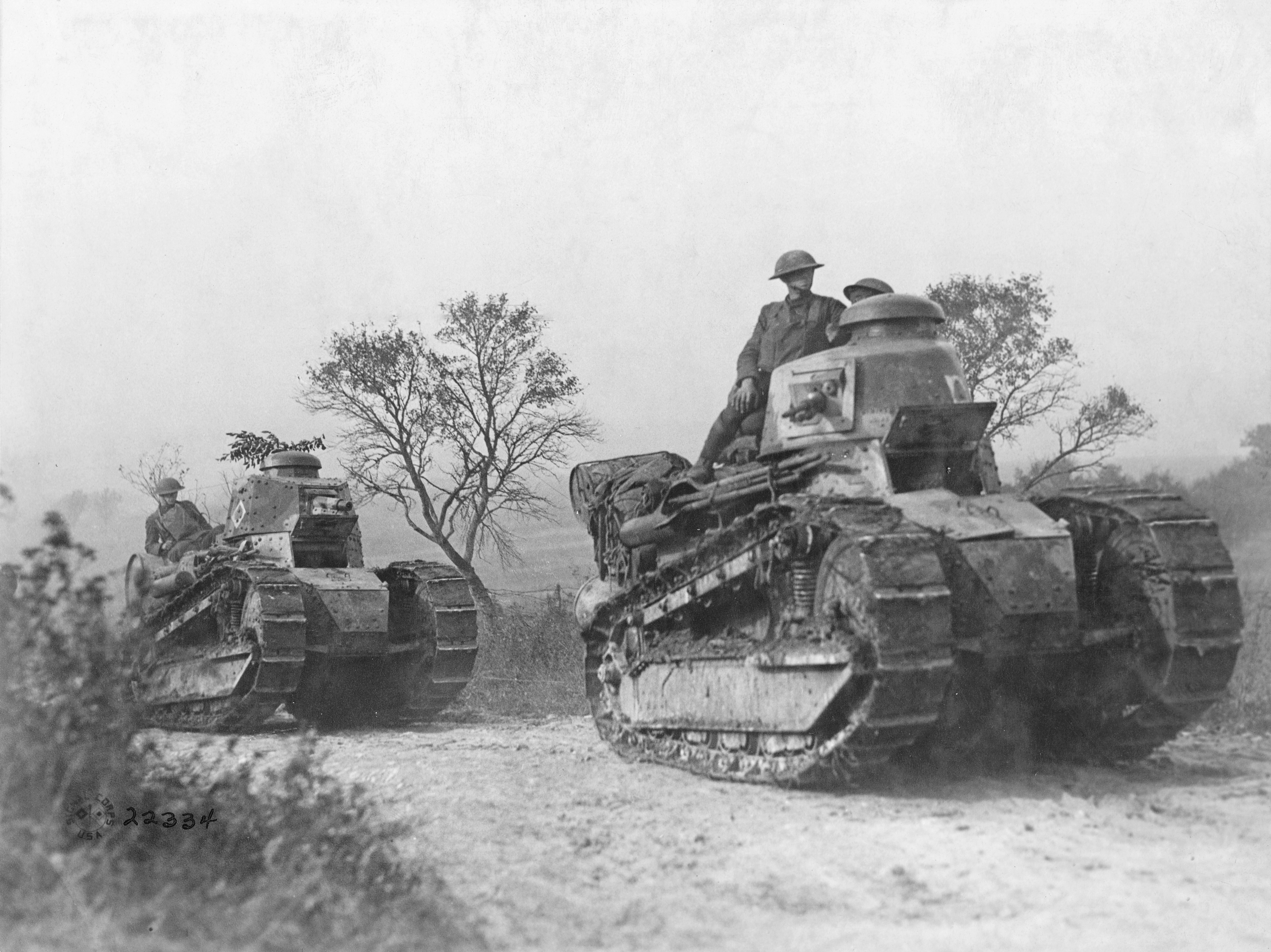
French Renault FT tanks, here operated by the US army, pioneered the use of a fully traversable turret and served as pattern for most modern tanks.

Whilst several experimental machines were investigated in France, it was a colonel of artillery, J.B.E. Estienne, who directly approached the Commander-in-Chief with detailed plans for a tank on caterpillar tracks, in late 1915. The result was two largely unsatisfactory types of tank, 400 each of the Schneider and Saint-Chamond, both based on the Holt tractor.

The following year, the French pioneered the use of a full 360° rotation turret in a tank for the first time, with the creation of the Renault FT light tank, with the turret containing the tank's main armament. In addition to the traversable turret, another innovative feature of the FT was its engine located at the rear. This pattern, with the gun located in a mounted turret and the engine at the back, has become the standard for most succeeding tanks across the world even to this day. The FT was the most numerous tank of the war; over 3,000 were made by late 1918.

===== Germany =====
Germany fielded very few tanks during World War I, and started development only after encountering British tanks on the Somme. The A7V, the only type made, was introduced in March 1918 with just 20 being produced during the war. The first tank versus tank action took place on 24 April 1918 at the Second Battle of Villers-Bretonneux, France, when three British Mark IVs met three German A7Vs. Captured British Mk IVs formed the bulk of Germany's tank forces during World War I; about 35 were in service at any one time. Plans to expand the tank programme were under way when the War ended.

===== United States =====
The United States Tank Corps used tanks supplied by France and Great Britain during World War I. Production of American-built tanks had just begun when the War came to an end.

===== Italy =====
Italy also manufactured two Fiat 2000s towards the end of the war, too late to see service.

===== Russia =====
Russia independently built and trialled two prototypes early in the War; the tracked, two-man Vezdekhod and the huge Lebedenko, but neither went into production. A tracked self-propelled gun was also designed but not produced.

Although tank tactics developed rapidly during the war, piecemeal deployments, mechanical problems, and poor mobility limited the military significance of the tank in World War I, and the tank did not fulfil its promise of rendering trench warfare obsolete. Nonetheless, it was clear to military thinkers on both sides that tanks in some way could have a significant role in future conflicts.

==== Interwar period ====
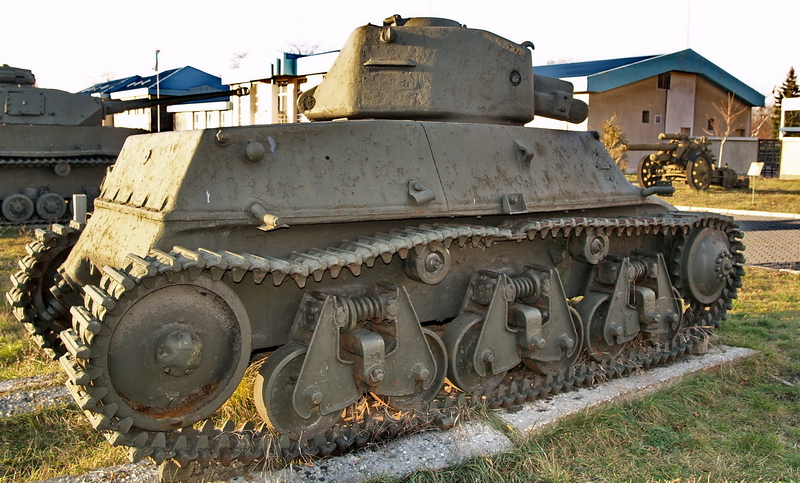
French Hotchkiss H-39 light tank of 1939 on display in the National Museum of Military History, Bulgaria

In the interwar period tanks underwent further mechanical development. In terms of tactics, J.F.C. Fuller's doctrine of spearhead attacks with massed tank formations was the basis for work by Heinz Guderian in Germany, Percy Hobart in Britain, Adna R. Chaffee, Jr., in the US, Charles de Gaulle in France, and Mikhail Tukhachevsky in the USSR. Liddell Hart held a more moderate view that all arms – cavalry, infantry and artillery – should be mechanised and work together. The British formed the all-arms Experimental Mechanized Force to test the use of tanks with supporting forces.

In the Second World War only Germany would initially put the theory into practice on a large scale, and it was their superior tactics and French blunders, not superior weapons, that made the "blitzkrieg" so successful in May 1940. For information regarding tank development in this period, see tank development between the wars.

Germany, Italy and the Soviet Union all experimented heavily with tank warfare during their clandestine and "volunteer" involvement in the Spanish Civil War, which saw some of the earliest examples of successful mechanised combined arms – such as when Republican troops, equipped with Soviet-supplied tanks and supported by aircraft, eventually routed Italian troops fighting for the Nationalists in the seven-day Battle of Guadalajara in 1937. However, of the nearly 700 tanks deployed during this conflict, only about 64 tanks representing the Franco faction and 331 from the Republican side were equipped with cannon, and of those 64 nearly all were World War I vintage Renault FT tanks, while the 331 Soviet supplied machines had 45 mm main guns and were of 1930s manufacture. The balance of Nationalist tanks were machine gun armed. The primary lesson learned from this war was that machine gun armed tanks had to be equipped with cannon, with the associated armour inherent to modern tanks.

The five-month-long war between the Soviet Union and the Japanese 6th Army at Khalkhin Gol (Nomonhan) in 1939 brought home some lessons. In this conflict, the Soviets fielded over two thousand tanks, to the around 73 cannon armed tanks deployed by the Japanese, the major difference being that Japanese armour were equipped with diesel engines as opposed to the Russian tanks equipped with petrol engines. After General Georgy Zhukov inflicted a defeat on the Japanese 6th Army with his massed combined tank and air attack, the Soviets learned a lesson on the use of gasoline engines, and quickly incorporated those newly found experiences into their new T-34 medium tank during World War II.

Prior to World War II, the tactics and strategy of deploying tank forces underwent a revolution. In August 1939, Soviet General Georgy Zhukov used the combined force of tanks and airpower at Nomonhan against the Japanese 6th Army; Heinz Guderian, a tactical theoretician who was heavily involved in the formation of the first independent German tank force, said "Where tanks are, the front is", and this concept became a reality in World War II. Guderian's armoured warfare ideas, combined with Germany's existing doctrines of Bewegungskrieg ("manoeuvre warfare") and infiltration tactics from World War I, became the basis of blitzkrieg in the opening stages of World War II.

==== World War II ====
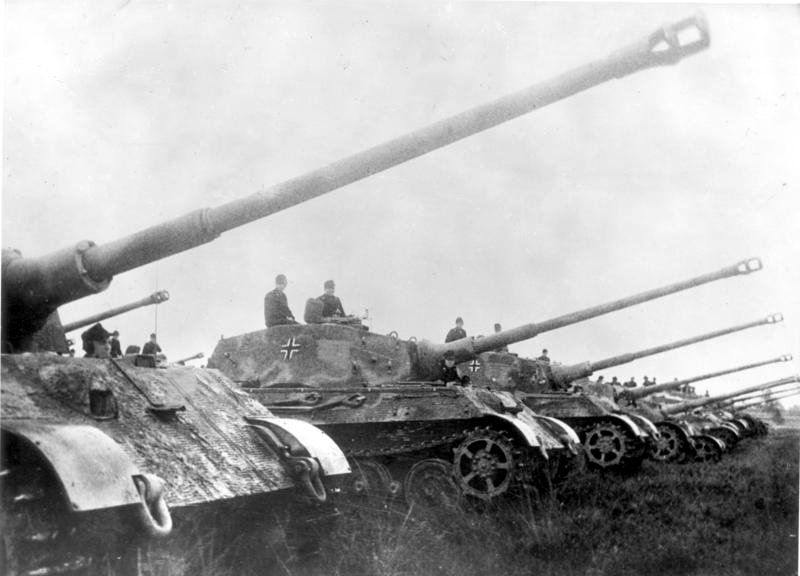
German Tiger II tanks of Schwere Panzer Abteilung 503 (s.Pz.Abt. 503) 'Feldherrnhalle' posing in formation for a German newsreel in 1944

===== Germany =====
During World War II, the first conflict in which armoured vehicles were critical to battlefield success, the tank and related tactics developed rapidly. Armoured forces proved capable of tactical victory in an unprecedentedly short amount of time, yet new anti-tank weaponry showed that the tank was not invulnerable. During the Invasion of Poland, tanks performed in a more traditional role in close cooperation with infantry units, but in the Battle of France deep independent armoured penetrations were executed by the Germans, a technique later called blitzkrieg. Blitzkrieg used innovative combined arms tactics and radios in all of the tanks to provide a level of tactical flexibility and power that surpassed that of the Allied armour. The French Army, with tanks equal or superior to the German tanks in both quality and quantity, employed a linear defensive strategy in which the armoured cavalry units were made subservient to the needs of the infantry armies to cover their entrenchment in Belgium. In addition, they lacked radios in many of their tanks and headquarters, which limited their ability to respond to German attacks.

In accordance with blitzkrieg methods, German tanks bypassed enemy strongpoints and could radio for close air support to destroy them, or leave them to the infantry. A related development, motorised infantry, allowed some of the troops to keep up with the tanks and create highly mobile combined arms forces. The defeat of a major military power within weeks shocked the rest of the world, spurring tank and anti-tank weapon development.

Cutaway of an M4A4 Sherman tank, the primary tank used by the United States and a number of the other western allies during the Second World War.

The North African Campaign also provided an important battleground for tanks, as the flat, desolate terrain with relatively few obstacles or urban environments was ideal for conducting mobile armoured warfare. However, this battlefield also showed the importance of logistics, especially in an armoured force, as the principal warring armies, the German Afrika Korps and the British Eighth Army, often outpaced their supply trains in repeated attacks and counter-attacks on each other, resulting in complete stalemate. This situation would not be resolved until 1942, when during the Second Battle of El Alamein, the Afrika Korps, crippled by disruptions in their supply lines, had 95% of its tanks destroyed and was forced to retreat by a massively reinforced Eighth Army, the first in a series of defeats that would eventually lead to the surrender of the remaining Axis forces in Tunisia.

===== Soviets =====
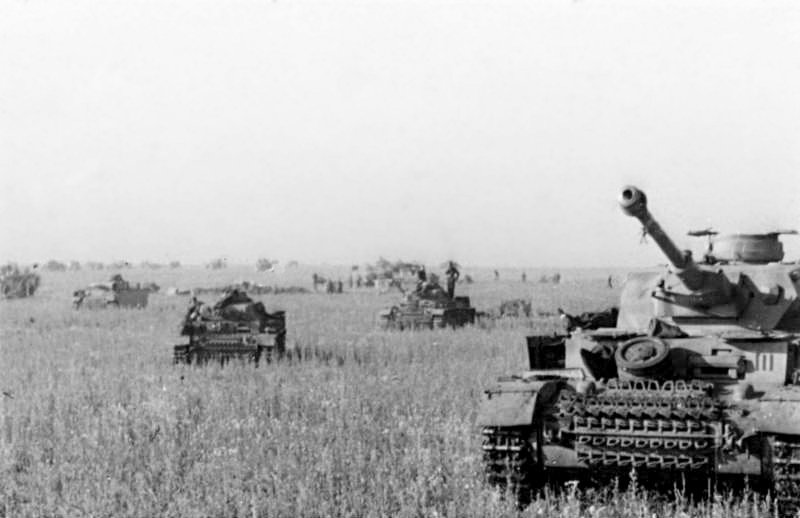
The Battle of Kursk was credited to be the largest tank battle ever fought, with each side deploying nearly 3,000 tanks.In the foreground axis is a Panzer IV, which was used extensively during the war and was the backbone of the German panzer divisions.

When Germany launched its invasion of the Soviet Union, Operation Barbarossa, the Soviets had a superior tank design, the T-34. A lack of preparations for the Axis surprise attack, mechanical problems, poor training of the crews and incompetent leadership caused the Soviet machines to be surrounded and destroyed in large numbers. However, interference from Adolf Hitler, the geographic scale of the conflict, the dogged resistance of the Soviet combat troops, and the Soviets' massive advantages in manpower and production capability prevented a repeat of the German successes of 1940. Despite early successes against the Soviets, the Germans were forced to up-gun their Panzer IVs, and to design and build both the larger and more expensive Tiger heavy tank in 1942, and the Panther medium tank the following year. In doing so, the Wehrmacht denied the infantry and other support arms the production priorities that they needed to remain equal partners with the increasingly sophisticated tanks, in turn violating the principle of combined arms they had pioneered. Soviet developments following the invasion included upgunning the T-34, development of self-propelled anti-tank guns such as the SU-152, and deployment of the IS-2 in the closing stages of the war, with the T-34 being the most produced tank of World War II, totalling up to some 65,000 examples by May 1945.

===== United States =====
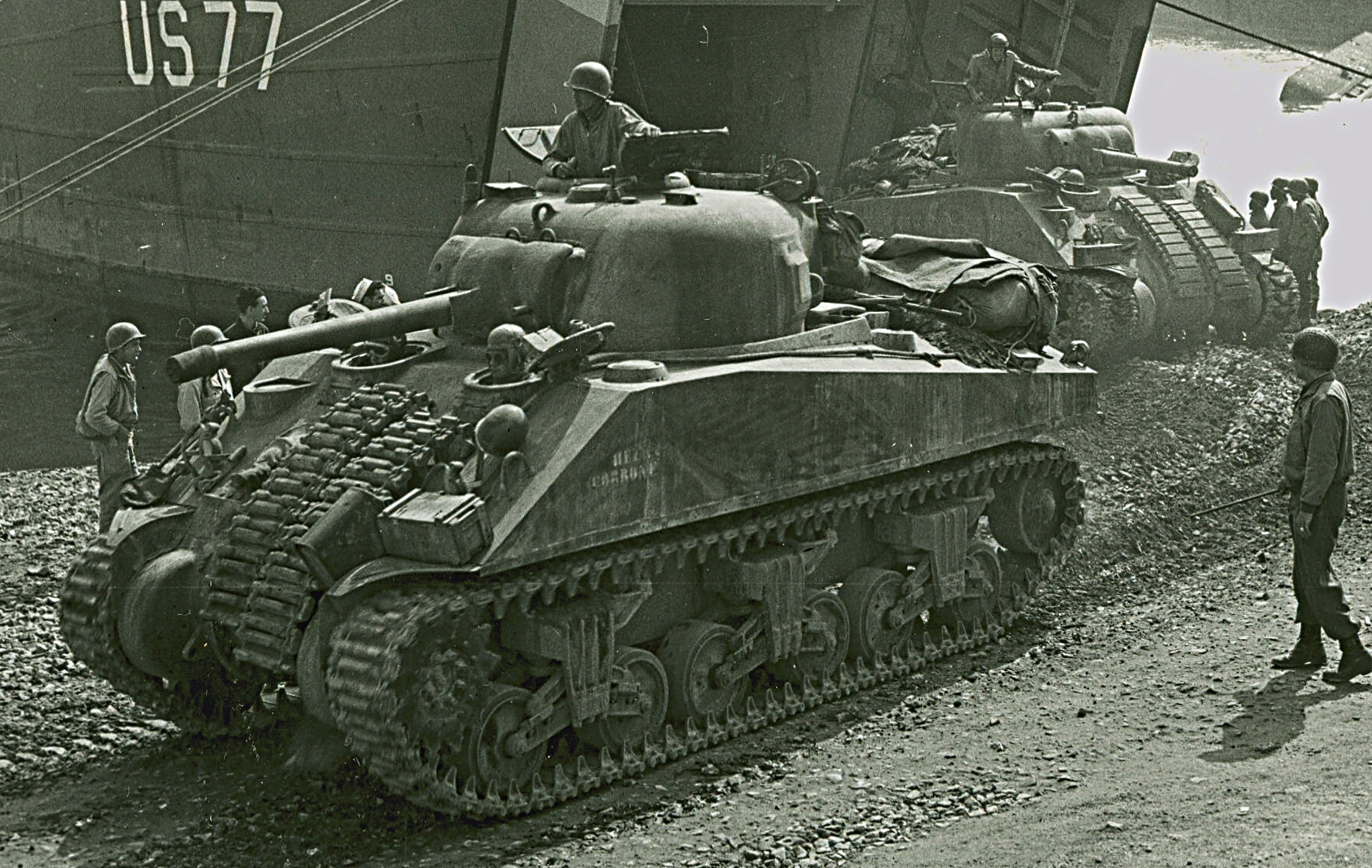
Sherman tanks joining the U.S. Fifth Army forces in the beachhead at Anzio during the Italian Campaign, 1944

Much like the Soviets, when entering World War II six months later (December 1941), the United States' mass production capacity enabled it to rapidly construct thousands of relatively cheap M4 Sherman medium tanks. A compromise all round, the Sherman was reliable and formed a large part of the Anglo-American ground forces, but in a tank-versus-tank battle was no match for the Panther or Tiger. Numerical and logistical superiority and the successful use of combined arms allowed the Allies to overrun the German forces during the Battle of Normandy. Upgunned versions with the 76 mm gun M1 and the 17-pounder were introduced to improve the M4's firepower, but concerns about protection remained – despite the apparent armour deficiencies, a total of some 42,000 Shermans were built and delivered to the Allied nations using it during the war years, a total second only to the T-34.

Tank hulls were modified to produce flame tanks, mobile rocket artillery, and combat engineering vehicles for tasks including mine-clearing and bridging. Specialised self-propelled guns, most of which could double as tank destroyers, were also both developed by the Germans – with their Sturmgeschütz, Panzerjäger and Jagdpanzer vehicles – and the Samokhodnaya ustanovka families of AFV's for the Soviets: such turretless, casemate-style tank destroyers and assault guns were less complex, stripped down tanks carrying heavy guns, solely firing forward. The firepower and low cost of these vehicles made them attractive but as manufacturing techniques improved and larger turret rings made larger tank guns feasible, the gun turret was recognised as the most effective mounting for the main gun to allow movement in a different direction from firing, enhancing tactical flexibility.

==== Cold War ====
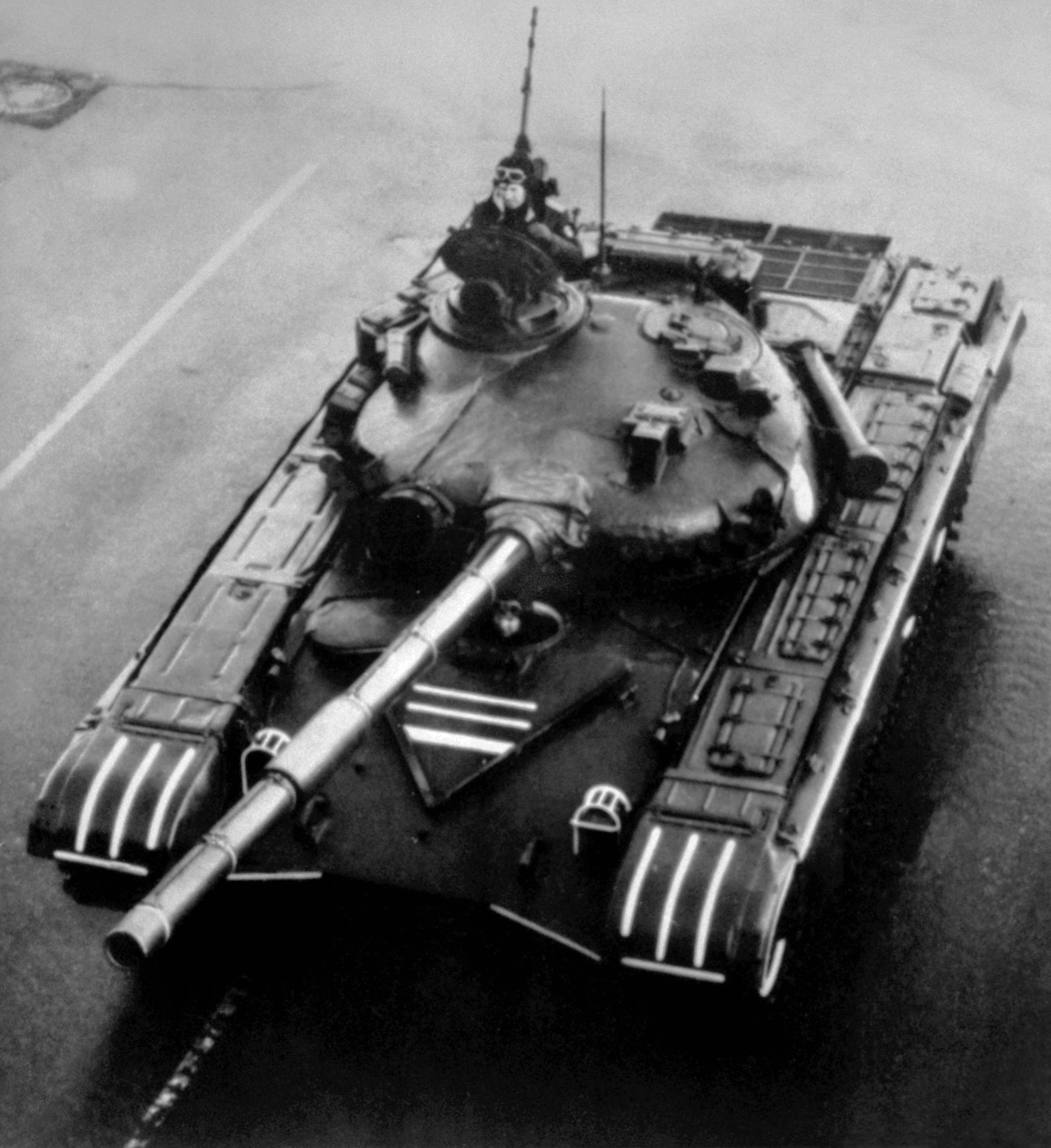
The Cold War era Soviet T-72 was the most widely deployed main battle tank across the world.

During the Cold War, tension between the Warsaw Pact countries and North Atlantic Treaty Organization (NATO) countries created an arms race that ensured that tank development proceeded largely as it had during World War II. The essence of tank designs during the Cold War had been hammered out in the closing stages of World War II. Large turrets, capable suspension systems, greatly improved engines, sloped armour and large-calibre (90 mm and larger) guns were standard. Tank design during the Cold War built on this foundation and included improvements to fire control, gyroscopic gun stabilisation, communications (primarily radio) and crew comfort and saw the introduction of laser rangefinders and infrared night vision equipment. Armour technology progressed in an ongoing race against improvements in anti-tank weapons, especially antitank guided missiles like the TOW.

Medium tanks of World War II evolved into the main battle tank (MBT) of the Cold War and took over the majority of tank roles on the battlefield. This gradual transition occurred in the 1950s and 1960s due to anti-tank guided missiles, sabot ammunition and high-explosive anti-tank warheads. World War II had shown that the speed of a light tank was no substitute for armour & firepower and medium tanks were vulnerable to newer weapon technology, rendering them obsolete.

In a trend started in World War II, economies of scale led to serial production of progressively upgraded models of all major tanks during the Cold War. For the same reason many upgraded post-World War II tanks and their derivatives (for example, the T-55 and T-72) remain in active service around the world, and even an obsolete tank may be the most formidable weapon on battlefields in many parts of the world. Among the tanks of the 1950s were the British Centurion and Soviet T-54/55 in service from 1946, and the US M48 from 1951. These three vehicles formed the bulk of the armoured forces of NATO and the Warsaw Pact throughout much of the Cold War. Lessons learned from tanks such as the Leopard 1, M48 Patton series, Chieftain, and T-72 led to the contemporary Leopard 2, M1 Abrams, Challenger 2, C1 Ariete, T-90 and Merkava IV.

Tanks and anti-tank weapons of the Cold War era saw action in a number of proxy wars like the Korean War, Vietnam War, Indo-Pakistani War of 1971, Soviet–Afghan War and Arab-Israeli conflicts, culminating with the Yom Kippur War. The T-55, for example, has seen action in no fewer than 32 conflicts. In these wars the U.S. or NATO countries and the Soviet Union or China consistently backed opposing forces. Proxy wars were studied by Western and Soviet military analysts and provided a contribution to the Cold War tank development process.

=== 21st century ===
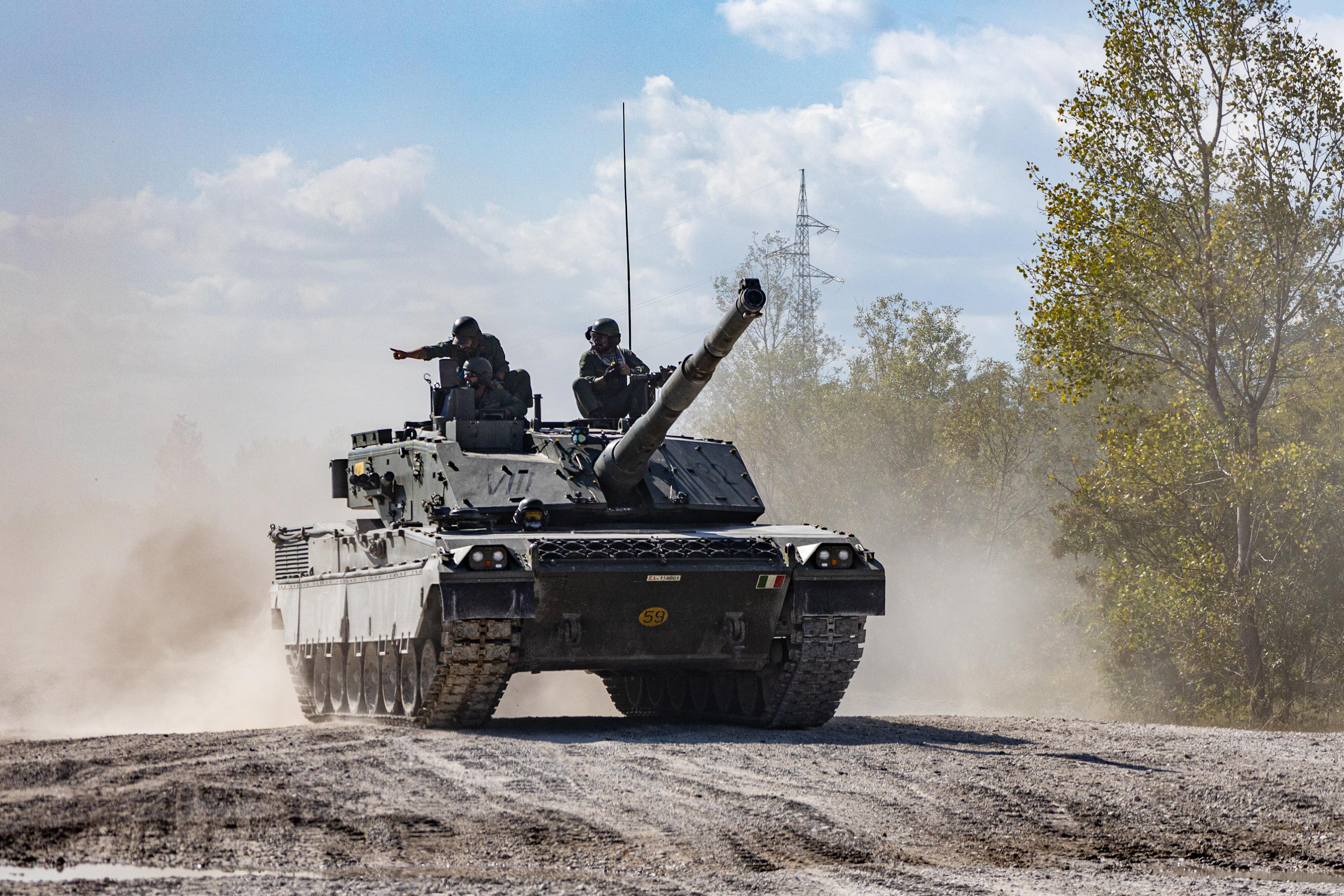
An Italian C1 Ariete in 2022.

The role of tank vs. tank combat is becoming diminished. Tanks work in concert with infantry in urban warfare by deploying them ahead of the platoon. When engaging enemy infantry, tanks can provide covering fire on the battlefield. Conversely, tanks can spearhead attacks when infantry are deployed in personnel carriers.

Tanks were used to spearhead the initial US invasion of Iraq in 2003. As of 2005, there were 1,100 M1 Abrams used by the United States Army in the course of the Iraq War, and they have proven to have an unexpectedly high level of vulnerability to roadside bombs. A relatively new type of remotely detonated mine, the explosively formed penetrator has been used with some success against American armoured vehicles (particularly the Bradley fighting vehicle). However, with upgrades to their armour in the rear, M1s have proven invaluable in fighting insurgents in urban combat, particularly at the Battle of Fallujah, where the US Marines brought in two extra brigades. Israeli Merkava tanks contain features that enable them to support infantry in low intensity conflicts (LIC) and counter-terrorism operations. Such features are the rear door and rear corridor, enabling the tank to carry infantry and embark safely; the IMI APAM-MP-T multi-purpose ammunition round, advanced C4IS systems and recently: TROPHY active protection system which protects the tank from shoulder-launched anti-tank weapons. During the Second Intifada further modifications were made, designated as "Merkava Mk. 3d Baz LIC".

==== Research and development ====
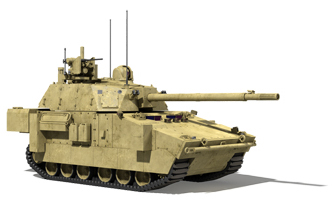
Graphic representation of the US Army's cancelled XM1202 Mounted Combat System

In terms of firepower, the focus of 2010s-era R&D was increased detection capability such as thermal imagers, automated fire control systems for the guns and increased muzzle energy from the gun to improve range, accuracy and armour penetration. The most mature future gun technology is the electrothermal-chemical gun. The XM291 electrothermal-chemical tank gun has gone through successful multiple firing sequences on a modified American M8 Armored Gun System chassis. To improve tank protection, one field of research involves making the tank invisible to radar by adapting stealth technologies originally designed for aircraft. Improvements to camouflage or and attempts to render it invisible through active camouflage, which changes according to where the tank is located, are being pursued. Research is also ongoing in electromagnetic armour systems to disperse or deflect incoming shaped charges, as well as various forms of active protection systems to prevent incoming projectiles (RPGs, missiles, etc.) from striking the tank.

Mobility may be enhanced in future tanks by the use of diesel–electric or turbine–electric series hybrid drives—first used in a primitive, gasoline-engined form with Porsche's Elefant German tank destroyer of 1943—improving fuel efficiency while reducing the size and weight of the power plant. Furthermore, advances in gas turbine technology, including the use of advanced recuperators, have allowed for reduction in engine volume and mass to less than 1 m^{3} and 1 metric ton, respectively, while maintaining fuel efficiency similar to that of a diesel engine. In line with the new doctrine of network-centric warfare, the 2010s-era modern battle tank shows increasing sophistication in its electronics and communication systems. The future of tanks has been challenged by the proliferation of relatively inexpensive anti tank guided missiles and rockets during the Russo-Ukrainian War.

== Design ==
Labelled diagram of an M1 Abrams

The three traditional factors determining a tank's capability effectiveness are its firepower, protection, and mobility. Firepower is the ability of a tank's crew to identify, engage, and destroy enemy tanks and other targets using its large-calibre cannon. Protection is the degree to which the tank's armour, profile and camouflage enables the tank crew to evade detection, protect themselves from enemy fire, and retain vehicle functionality during and after combat. Mobility includes how well the tank can be transported by rail, sea, or air to the operational staging area; from the staging area by road or over terrain towards the enemy; and tactical movement by the tank over the battlefield during combat, including traversing of obstacles and rough terrain. The variations of tank designs have been determined by the way these three fundamental features are blended. For instance, in 1937, the French doctrine focused on firepower and protection more than mobility because tanks worked in intimate liaison with the infantry. There was also the case of the development of a heavy cruiser tank, which focused on armour and firepower to challenge Germany's Tiger and Panther tanks.

=== Classification ===
Tanks have been classified by weight, role, or other criteria, that has changed over time and place. Classification is determined by the prevailing theories of armoured warfare, which have been altered in turn by rapid advances in technology. No one classification system works across all periods or all nations; in particular, weight-based classification is inconsistent between countries and eras.

In World War I, the first tank designs focused on crossing wide trenches, requiring very long and large vehicles, such as the British Mark I; these became classified as heavy tanks. Tanks that fulfilled other combat roles were smaller, like the French Renault FT; these were classified as light tanks or tankettes. Many late-war and inter-war tank designs diverged from these according to new, though mostly untried, concepts for future tank roles and tactics. Tank classifications varied considerably according to each nation's own tank development, such as "cavalry tanks", "fast tanks", and "breakthrough tanks".

During World War II, many tank concepts were found unsatisfactory and discarded, mostly leaving the more multi-role tanks; these became easier to classify. Tank classes based on weight (and the corresponding transport and logistical needs) led to new definitions of heavy and light tank classes, with medium tanks covering the balance of those between. The British maintained cruiser tanks, focused on speed, and infantry tanks that traded speed for more armour. Tank destroyers are tanks or other armoured fighting vehicles specifically designed to defeat enemy tanks. Assault guns are armoured fighting vehicles that could combine the roles of infantry tanks and tank destroyers. Some tanks were converted to flame tanks, specialising on close-in attacks on enemy strongholds with flamethrowers. As the war went on, tanks tended to become larger and more powerful, shifting some tank classifications and leading to super-heavy tanks.

Experience and technology advances during the Cold War continued to consolidate tank roles. With the worldwide adoption of the modern main battle tank designs, which favour a modular universal design, most other classifications are dropped from modern terminology. All main battle tanks tend to have a good balance of speed, armour, and firepower, even while technology continues to improve all three. Being fairly large, main battle tanks can be complemented with light tanks, armoured personnel carriers, infantry fighting vehicles or similar relatively lighter armoured fighting vehicles, typically in the roles of armoured reconnaissance, amphibious or air assault operations, or against enemies lacking main battle tanks.

=== Offensive capabilities ===
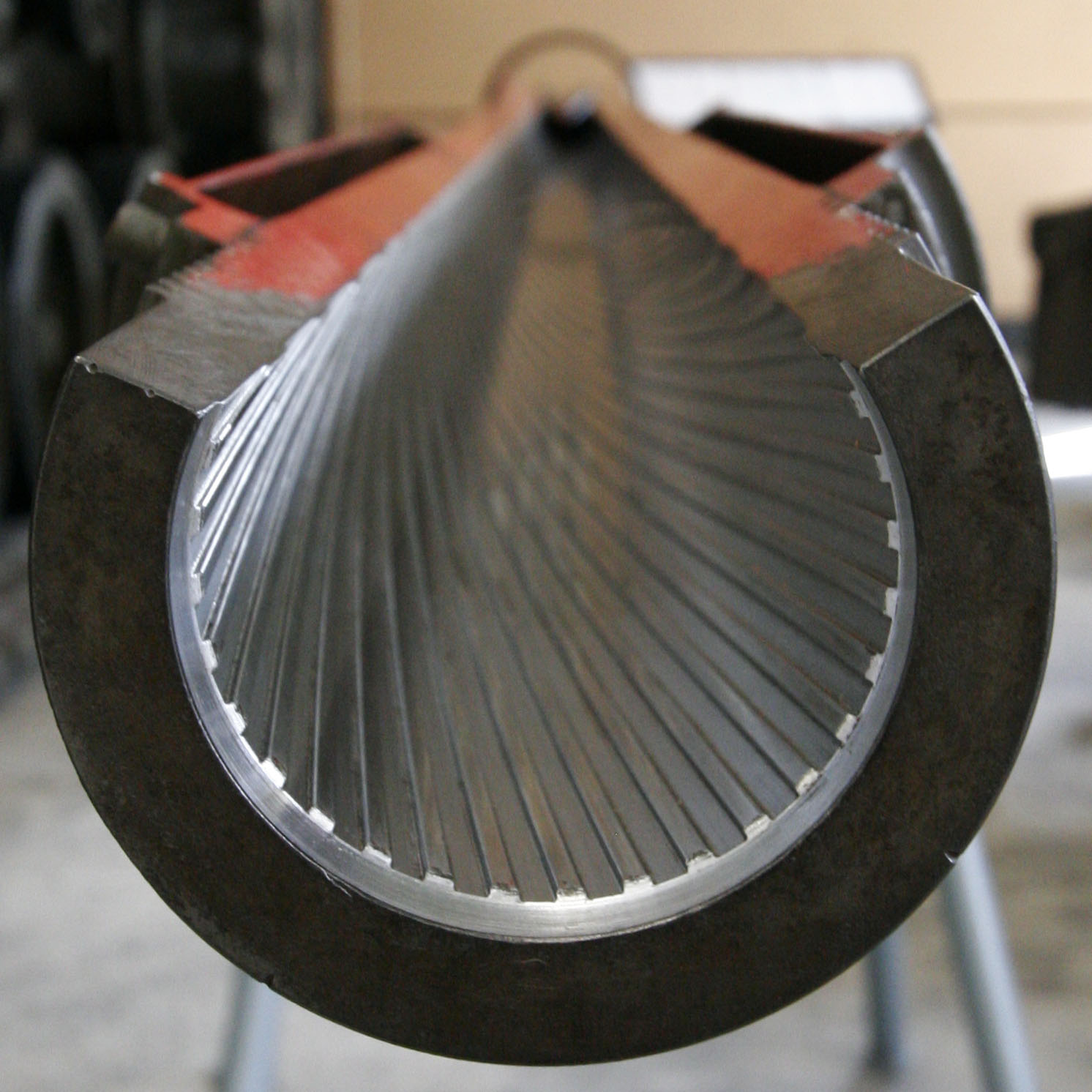
A sectioned 105 mm rifled Royal Ordnance L7 tank gun

The main weapon of modern tanks is typically a single, large-calibre cannon mounted in a fully traversing (rotating) gun turret. The typical modern tank gun is a smoothbore weapon capable of firing a variety of ammunition, including armour-piercing kinetic energy penetrators (KEP), also known as armour-piercing discarding sabot (APDS), and/or armour-piercing fin-stabilised discarding sabot (APFSDS) and high-explosive anti-tank (HEAT) shells, and/or high-explosive squash head (HESH) and/or anti-tank guided missiles (ATGM) to destroy armoured targets, as well as high-explosive (HE) shells for shooting at "soft" targets (unarmoured vehicles or troops) or fortifications. Canister shot may be used in close or urban combat situations where the risk of hitting friendly forces with shrapnel from HE rounds is unacceptably high.

A gyroscope is used to stabilise the main gun, allowing it to be effectively aimed and fired at the "short halt" or on the move. Modern tank guns are also commonly fitted with insulating thermal sleeves to reduce gun-barrel warping caused by uneven thermal expansion, bore evacuators to minimise gun firing fumes entering the crew compartment and sometimes muzzle brakes to minimise the effect of recoil on accuracy and rate of fire.

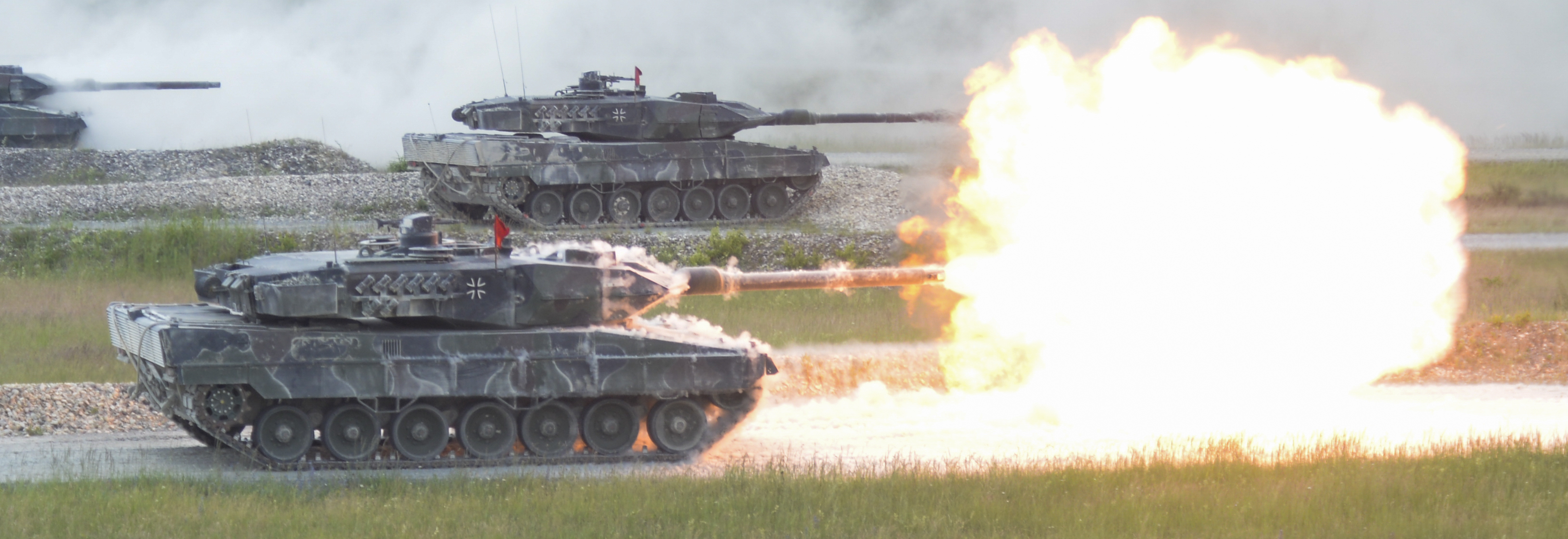
German Leopard 2A6 from a Panzerbattalion fires its main gun during the shoot-off of Strong Europe Tank Challenge.

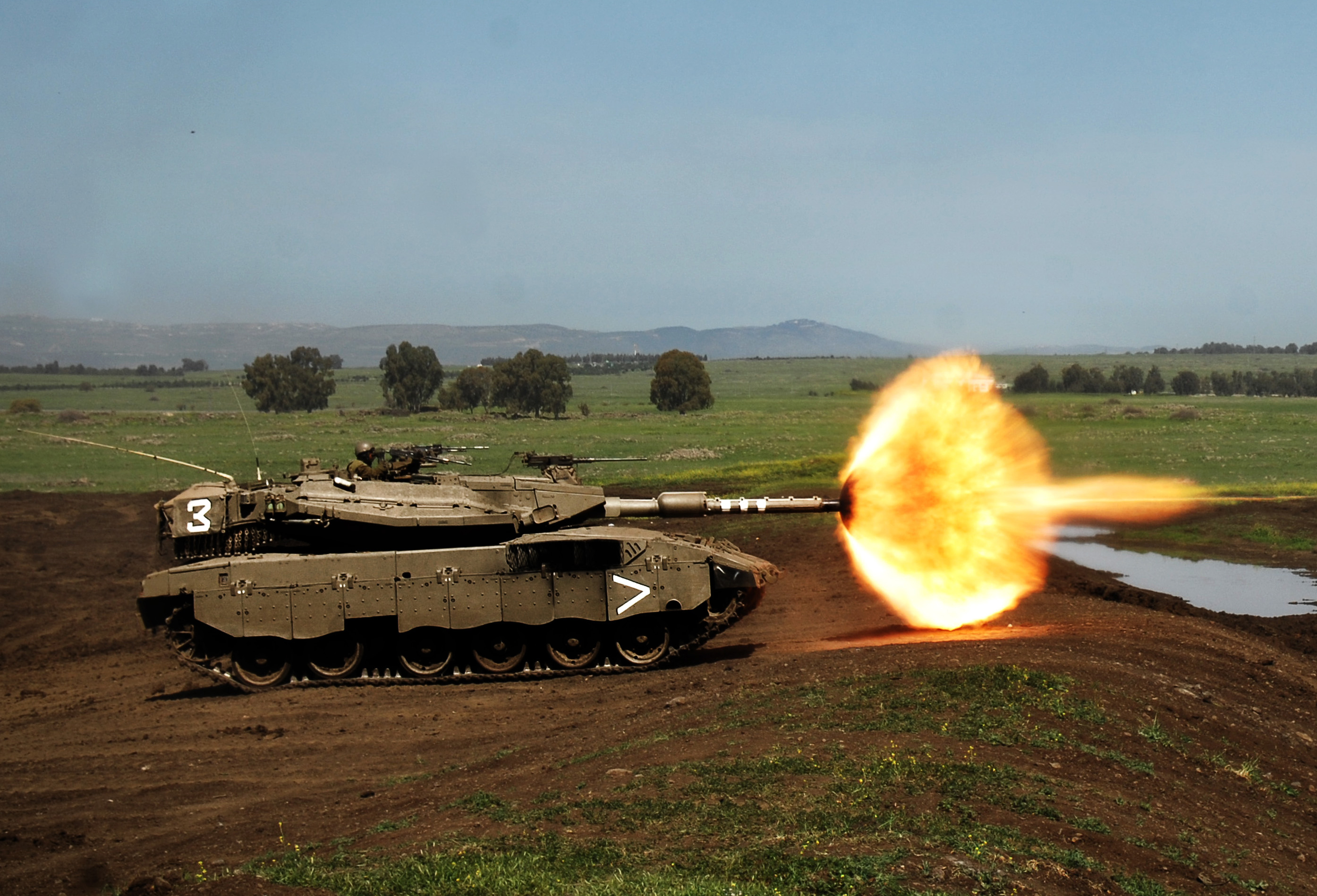
A Merkava Mk IIID Baz firing

Traditionally, target detection relied on visual identification. This was accomplished from within the tank through telescopic periscopes; often, however, tank commanders would open up the hatch to view the outside surroundings, which improved situational awareness but incurred the penalty of vulnerability to sniper fire. Though several developments in target detection have taken place, these methods are still common practice. In the 2010s, more electronic target detection methods are available.

In some cases spotting rifles were used to confirm proper trajectory and range to a target. These spotting rifles were mounted co-axially to the main gun, and fired tracer ammunition ballistically matched to the gun itself. The gunner would track the movement of the tracer round in flight, and upon impact with a hard surface, it would give off a flash and a puff of smoke, after which the main gun was immediately fired. However this slow method has been mostly superseded by laser rangefinding equipment.

Modern tanks also use sophisticated light intensification and thermal imaging equipment to improve fighting capability at night, in poor weather and in smoke. The accuracy of modern tank guns is pushed to the mechanical limit by computerised fire-control systems. A fire-control system uses a laser rangefinder to determine the range to the target, a thermocouple, anemometer and wind vane to correct for weather effects and a muzzle referencing system to correct for gun-barrel temperature, warping and wear. Two sightings of a target with the range-finder enable calculation of the target movement vector. This information is combined with the known movement of the tank and the principles of ballistics to calculate the elevation and aim point that maximises the probability of hitting the target.

Usually, tanks carry smaller calibre armament for short-range defence where fire from the main weapon would be ineffective or wasteful, for example when engaging infantry, light vehicles or close air support aircraft. A typical complement of secondary weapons is a general-purpose machine gun mounted coaxially with the main gun, and a heavier anti-aircraft-capable machine gun on the turret roof. Some tanks also have a hull-mounted machine gun. These weapons are often modified variants of those used by infantry, and so use the same kinds of ammunition.

=== Protection and countermeasures ===
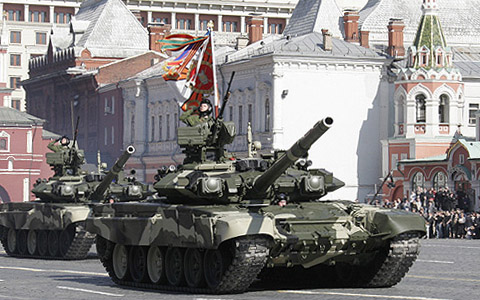
The Russian T-90 is fitted with a "three-tiered" protection systems: 1: Shtora-1 countermeasures suite Composite armour in the turret 2: Third generation Kontakt-5 ERA 3: .Composite armour in the turret behind a thick layer of RHA.

The measure of a tank's protection is the combination of its ability to avoid detection (due to having a low profile and through the use of camouflage), to avoid being hit by enemy fire, its resistance to the effects of enemy fire, and its capacity to sustain damage whilst still completing its objective, or at least protecting its crew. This is done by a variety of countermeasures, such as armour plating and reactive defences, as well as more complex ones such as heat-emissions reduction.

In common with most unit types, tanks are subject to additional hazards in dense wooded and urban combat environments which largely negate the advantages of the tank's long-range firepower and mobility, limit the crew's detection capabilities and can restrict turret traverse. Despite these disadvantages, tanks retain high survivability against previous-generation rocket-propelled grenades aimed at the most-armoured sections.

However, as effective and advanced as armour plating has become, tank survivability against newer-generation tandem-warhead anti-tank missiles is a concern for military planners. Tandem-warhead RPGs use two warheads to fool active protection systems; a first dummy warhead is fired first, to trigger the active defences, with the real warhead following it. For example, the RPG-29 from the 1980s is able to penetrate the frontal hull armour of the Challenger II and also managed to damage a M1 Abrams. As well, even tanks with advanced armour plating can have their tracks or gear cogs damaged by RPGs, which may render them immobile or hinder their mobility. Despite all of the advances in armour plating, a tank with its hatches open remains vulnerable to Molotov cocktail (gasoline bombs) and grenades. Even a "buttoned up" tank may have components which are vulnerable to Molotov cocktails, such as optics, extra gas cans and extra ammunition stored on the outside of the tank.

==== Avoiding detection ====
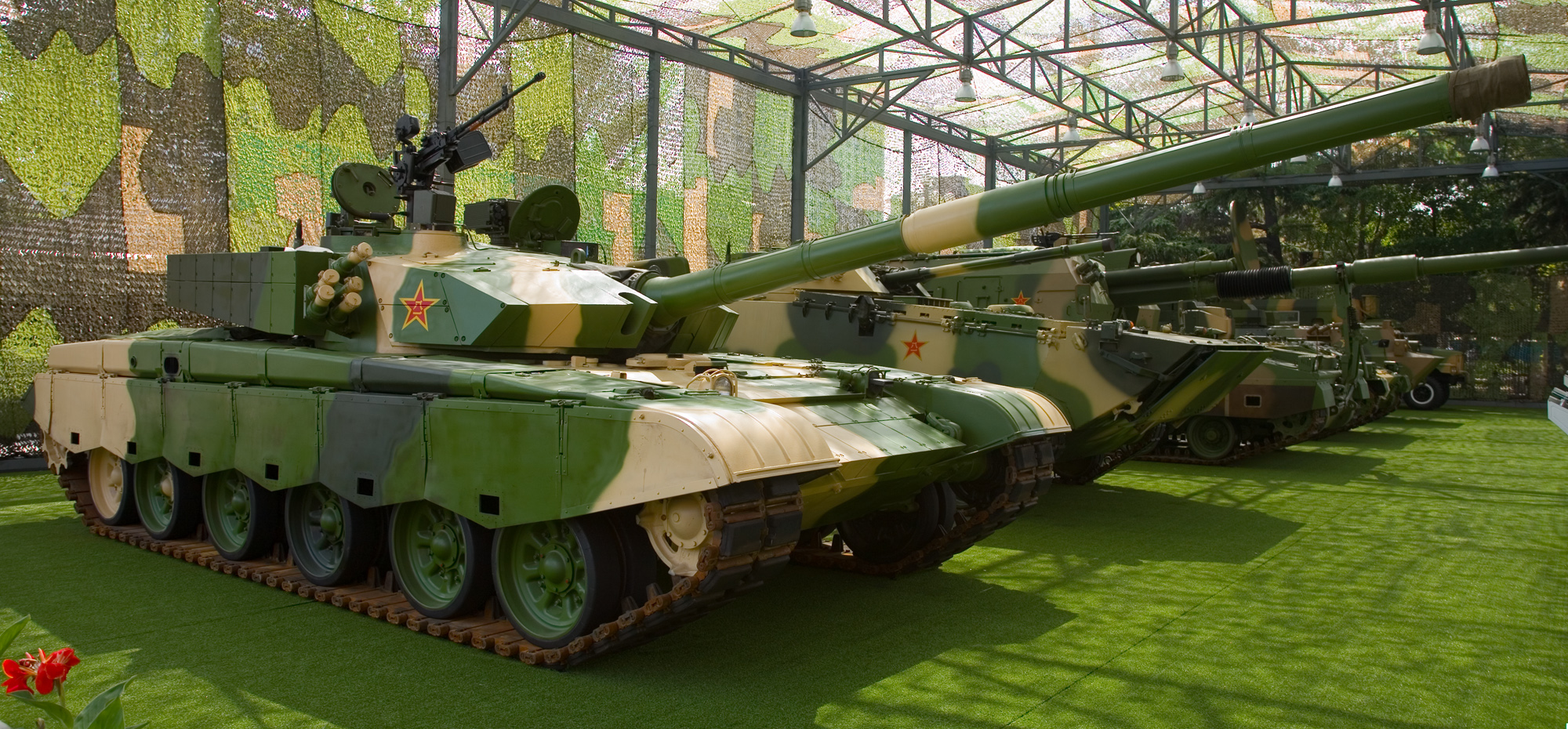
PLA's Type 99a tank with disruptive camouflage painting

A tank avoids detection using the doctrine of countermeasures known as CCD: camouflage (looks the same as the surroundings), concealment (cannot be seen) and deception (looks like something else).

===== Camouflage =====
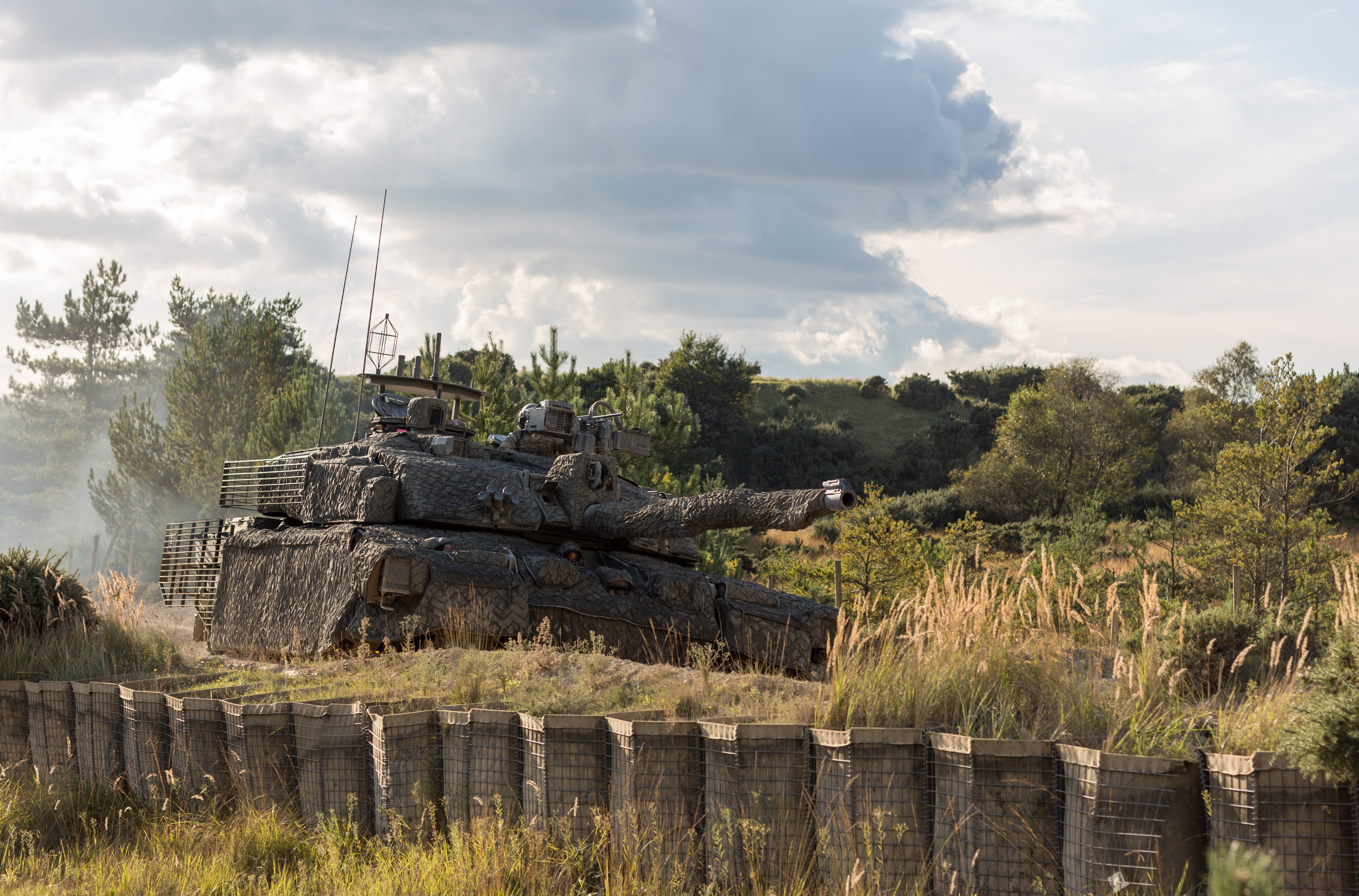
A British Challenger 2 Theatre Entry Standard fitted with a mobile camouflage system.

Camouflage can include disruptive painted shapes on the tank to break up the distinctive appearance and silhouette of a tank. Netting or actual branches from the surrounding landscape are also used. Prior to development of infrared technology, tanks were often given a coating of camouflage paint that, depending on environmental region or season, would allow it to blend in with the rest of its environment. A tank operating in wooded areas would typically get a green and brown paintjob; a tank in a winter environment would get white paint (often mixed with some darker colours); tanks in the desert often get khaki paintjobs.

The Russian Nakidka camouflage kit was designed to reduce the optical, thermal, infrared, and radar signatures of a tank, so that acquisition of the tank would be difficult. According to Nii Stali, the designers of Nakidka, Nakidka would reduce the probabilities of detection via "visual and near-IR bands by 30%, the thermal band by 2–3-fold, radar band by 6-fold, and radar-thermal band to near-background levels.

===== Concealment =====
Concealment can include hiding the tank among trees or digging in the tank by having a combat bulldozer dig out part of a hill (or attach a dozer blade on the hill of the tank, i.e. Stridsvagn 103 or some Russian tanks), so that much of the tank will be hidden. A tank commander can conceal the tank by using "hull down" approaches to going over upward-sloping hills, so that she or he can look out the commander's cupola without the distinctive-looking main cannon cresting over the hill. Adopting a turret-down or hull-down position reduces the visible silhouette of a tank as well as providing the added protection of a position in defilade.

Working against efforts to avoid detection is the fact that a tank is a large metallic object with a distinctive, angular silhouette that emits copious heat and engine noise. A tank that is operating in cold weather or which needs to use its radio or other communications or target-detecting electronics will need to start its engine regularly to maintain its battery power, which will create engine noise. Consequently, it is difficult to effectively camouflage a tank in the absence of some form of cover or concealment (e.g., woods) it can hide its hull behind. The tank becomes easier to detect when moving (typically, whenever it is in use) due to the large, distinctive auditory, vibration and thermal signature of its engine and power plant. Tank tracks and dust clouds also betray past or present tank movement.

Switched-off tanks are vulnerable to infra-red detection due to differences between the thermal conductivity and therefore heat dissipation of the metallic tank and its surroundings. At close range the tank can be detected even when powered down and fully concealed due to the column of warmer air above the tank and the smell of diesel or gasoline. Thermal blankets slow the rate of heat emission and some thermal camouflage nets use a mix of materials with differing thermal properties to operate in the infra-red as well as the visible spectrum.

Grenade launchers can rapidly deploy a smoke screen that is opaque to infrared light, to hide it from the thermal viewer of another tank. In addition to using its own grenade launchers, a tank commander could call in an artillery unit to provide smoke cover. Some tanks can produce a thick smoke screen(called ESS) by injecting diesel fuel directly into the hot exhaust manifold or onto turbine blades, where the heat evaporates the fuel.

Sometimes camouflage and concealment are used at the same time. For example, a camouflage-painted and branch-covered tank (camouflage) may be hidden in a behind a hill or in a dug-in-emplacement (concealment).

===== Deception =====
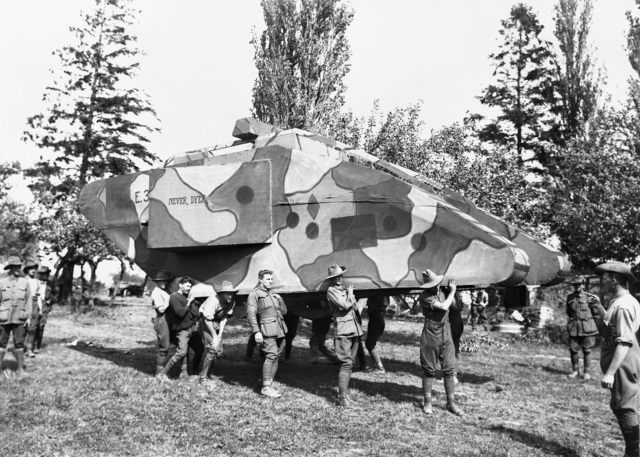
Troops carry a lightweight wood-framed "dummy" tank into position.

Some armoured recovery vehicles (often tracked, tank chassis-based "tow trucks" for tanks) have dummy turrets and cannons. This makes it less likely that enemy tanks will fire on these vehicles. Some armies have fake "dummy" tanks made of wood which troops can carry into position and hide behind obstacles. These "dummy" tanks may cause the enemy to think that there are more tanks than are actually possessed.

==== Armour ====
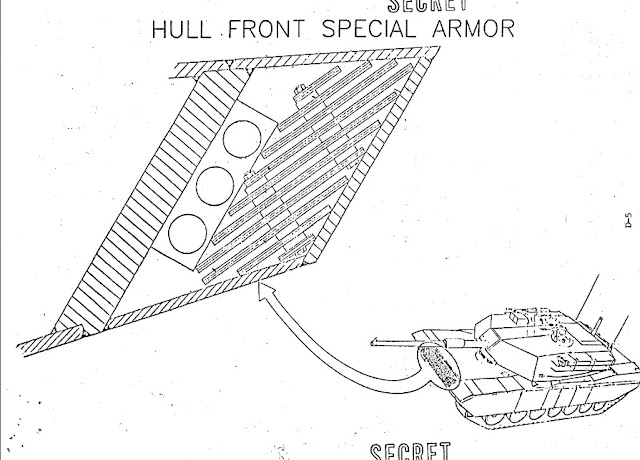
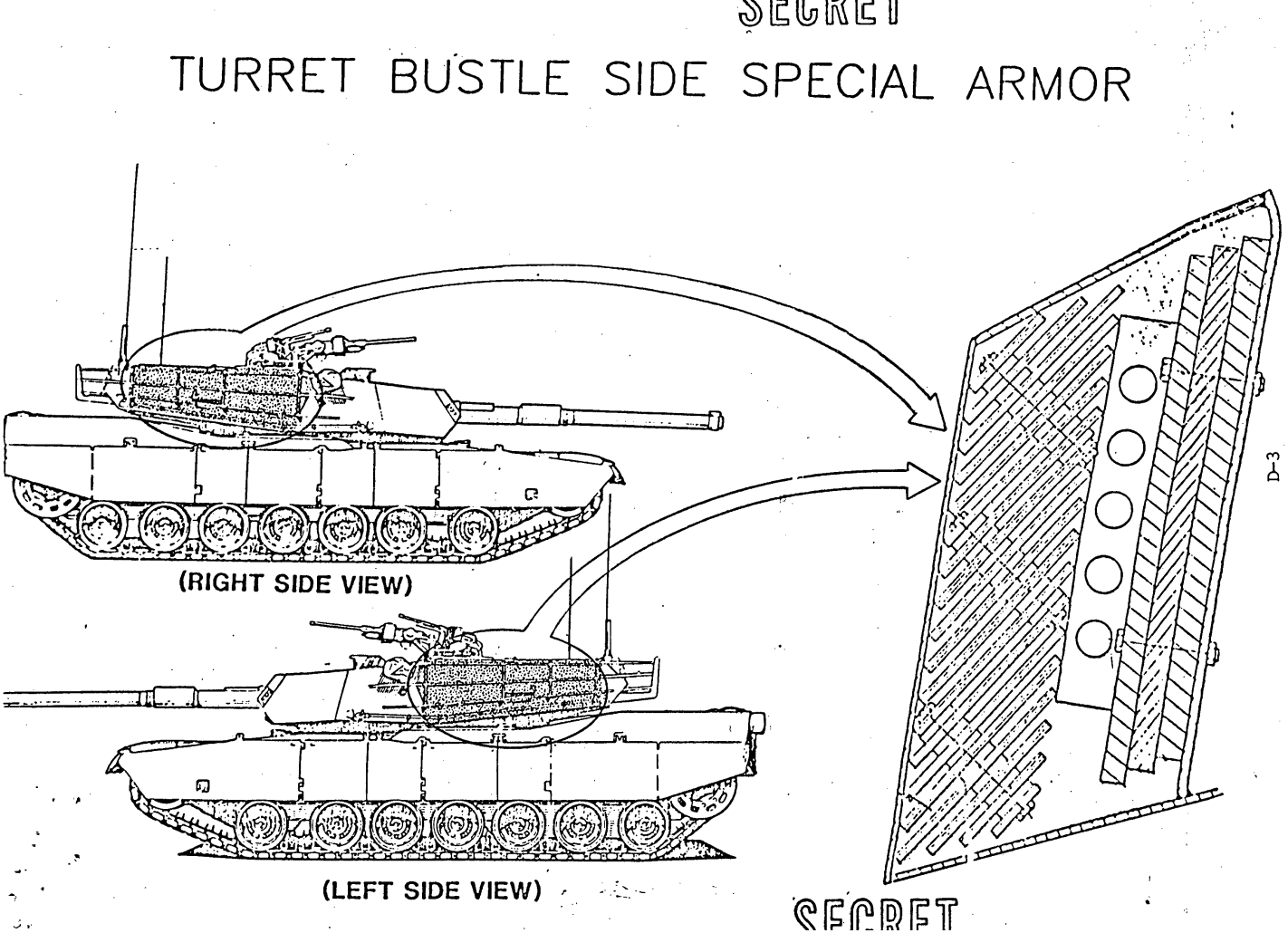
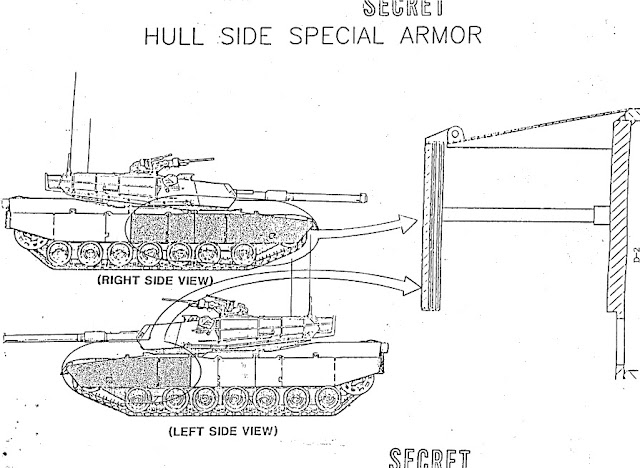
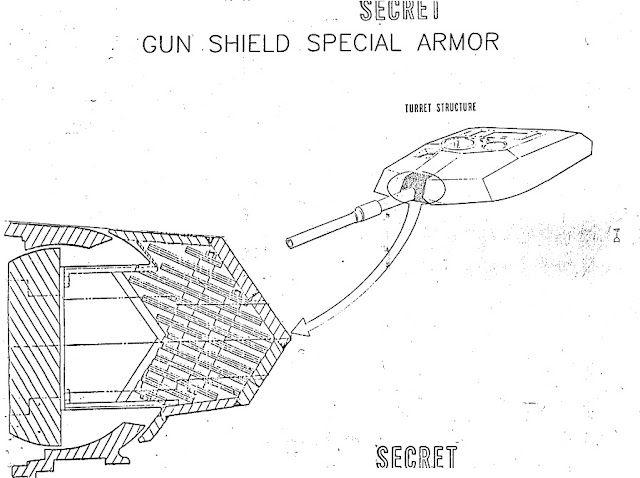
Configuration of M1 Abrams Chobham reactive armor. Clockwise from upper left: Hull front, turret bustle, hull side, gun shield.

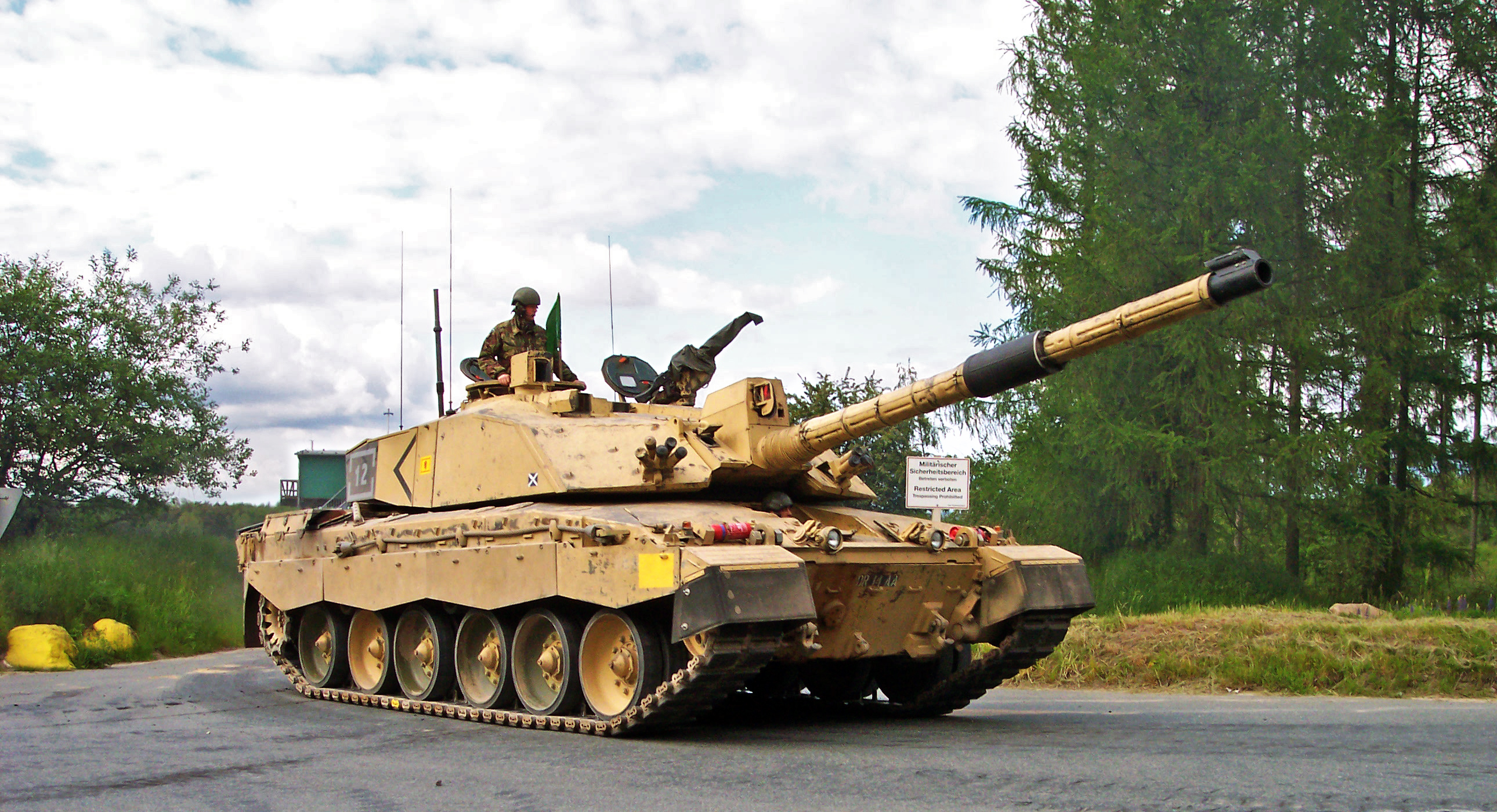
The British Challenger II is protected by second-generation Chobham armour

To effectively protect the tank and its crew, tank armour must counter a wide variety of antitank threats. Protection against kinetic energy penetrators(APFSDS) and high-explosive anti-tank (HEAT) shells fired by other tanks is of primary importance, but tank armour also aims to protect against infantry armed with mortars, grenades, rocket-propelled grenades, anti-tank guided missiles, anti-tank mines, anti-tank rifles, bombs, direct artillery hits, and (less often) nuclear, biological and chemical threats, any of which could disable or destroy a tank or kill its crew.

Steel armour plate was the earliest type of armour. The Germans pioneered the use of face hardened steel during World War II and the Soviets also achieved improved protection with sloped armour technology. World War II developments led to the obsolescence of homogeneous steel armour with the development of shaped-charge warheads, exemplified by the Panzerfaust and bazooka infantry-carried weapons which were effective, despite some early success with spaced armour. Magnetic mines led to the development of anti-magnetic paste(zimmerit) that was also pioneered by the Germans. From WWII to the modern era, troops have added improvised armour to tanks while in combat settings, such as sandbags or pieces of old armour plating.

British tank researchers took the next step with the development of Chobham armour, or more generally composite armour, incorporating ceramics and plastics in a resin matrix between steel plates, which provided good protection against HEAT weapons. High-explosive squash head warheads led to anti-spall armour linings, and kinetic energy penetrators led to the inclusion of exotic materials like a matrix of depleted uranium into a composite armour configuration.

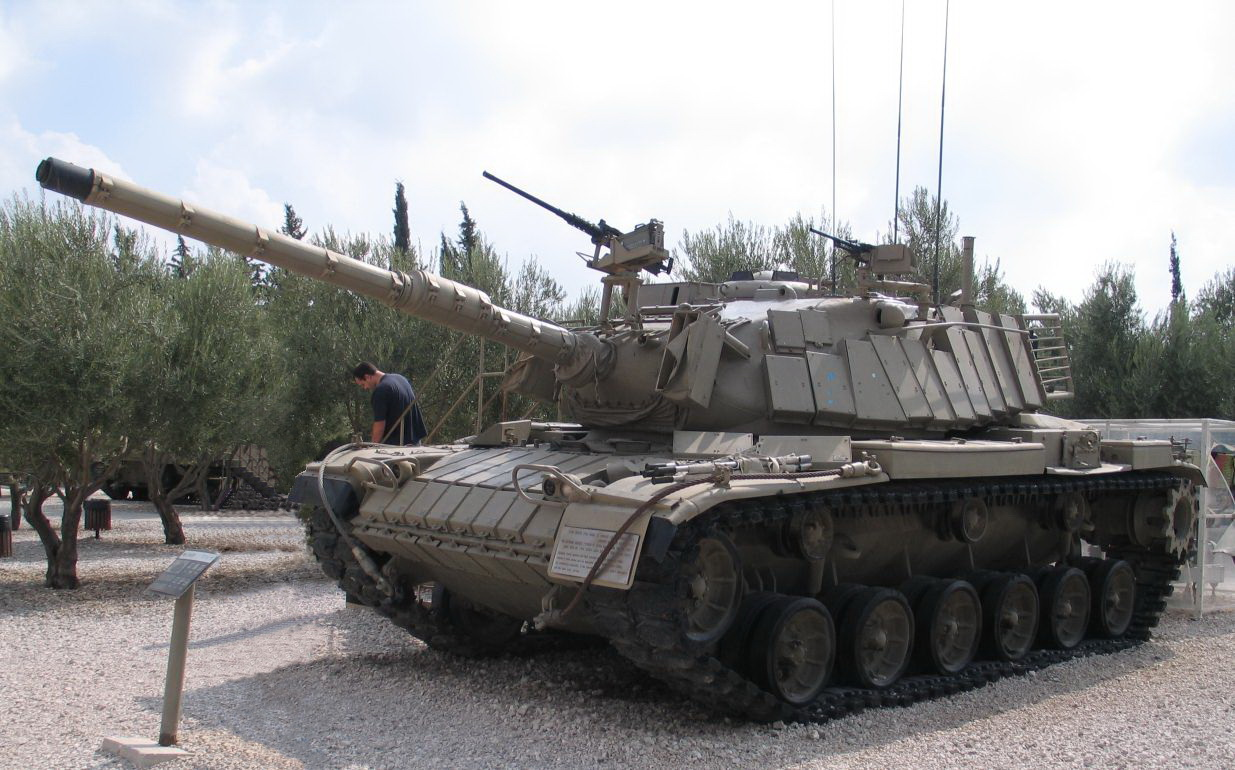
Blazer explosive reactive armour (ERA) blocks on an Israeli M-60

Reactive armour consists of small explosive-filled metal boxes that detonate when hit by the metallic jet projected by an exploding HEAT warhead, causing their metal plates to disrupt it which in the end stops most of the penetration. Tandem warheads defeats reactive armour by causing the armour to detonate prematurely. Modern reactive armour protects itself from Tandem warheads by having a thicker front metal plate to prevent the precursor charge from detonating the explosive in the reactive armour. Reactive armours can also reduce the penetrative abilities of kinetic energy penetrators by deforming the penetrator with the metal plates on the Reactive armour, thereby reducing its effectiveness against the main armour of the tank.

==== Active protection system ====
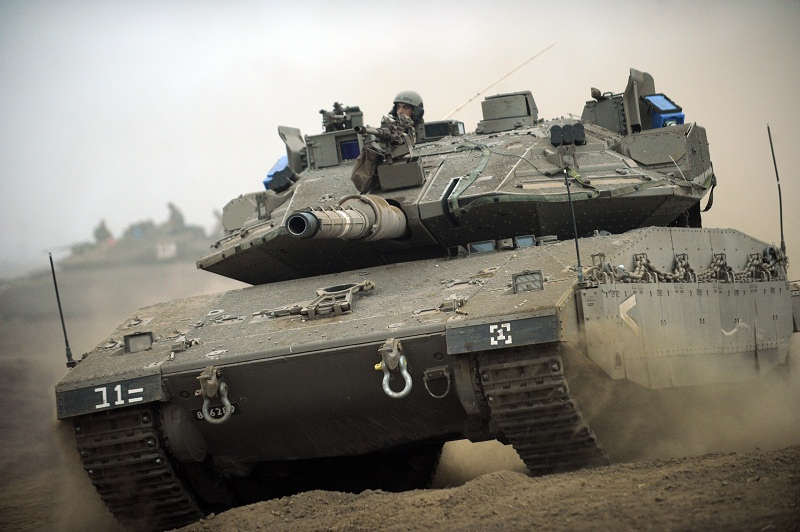
IDF Merkava Mk4 tank with Trophy APS ("מעיל רוח") during training

The latest generation of protective measures for tanks are active protection systems. The term "active" is used to contrast these approaches with the armour used as the primary protective approach in earlier tanks.

- Soft kill measures, such as the Russian Shtora countermeasure system, provide protection by interfering with enemy targeting and fire-control systems, thus making it harder for the enemy threats to lock onto the targeted tank.
- Hard kill systems intercept incoming threats with a projectile(s) of its own, destroying the threat. For example, the Israeli Trophy destroys an incoming rocket or missile with shotgun-like projectiles. The Soviet Drozd, the Russian Arena, the Israeli Iron Fist, Polish ERAWA, and the American Quick Kill systems show the potential to dramatically improve protection for tanks against missiles, RPGs and potentially kinetic energy penetrator attacks, but concerns regarding a danger zone for nearby troops remain.

=== Mobility ===
Two German Army Leopard 2s from the 393rd Armoured Battalion demonstrates their deep-wading capabilities at 31 August 2008.

The mobility of a tank is described by its battlefield or tactical mobility, its operational mobility, and its strategic mobility.

- Tactical mobility is the tank's ability to move through the battle area. This could include acceleration, braking, speed and rate of turn on varying terrain, and obstacle clearance: the tank's ability to travel over or through obstacles like walls, trenches, and water.
- Operational mobility is the ability to move tanks hundreds of kilometres from a staging area to the battle area, for example, by using transport helicopters.
- Strategic mobility is the ability of the tanks to be transported over long distances, usually by air or sea. For tanks to be transported efficiently by air, weight and volume must be kept within the transport aircraft's capabilities.

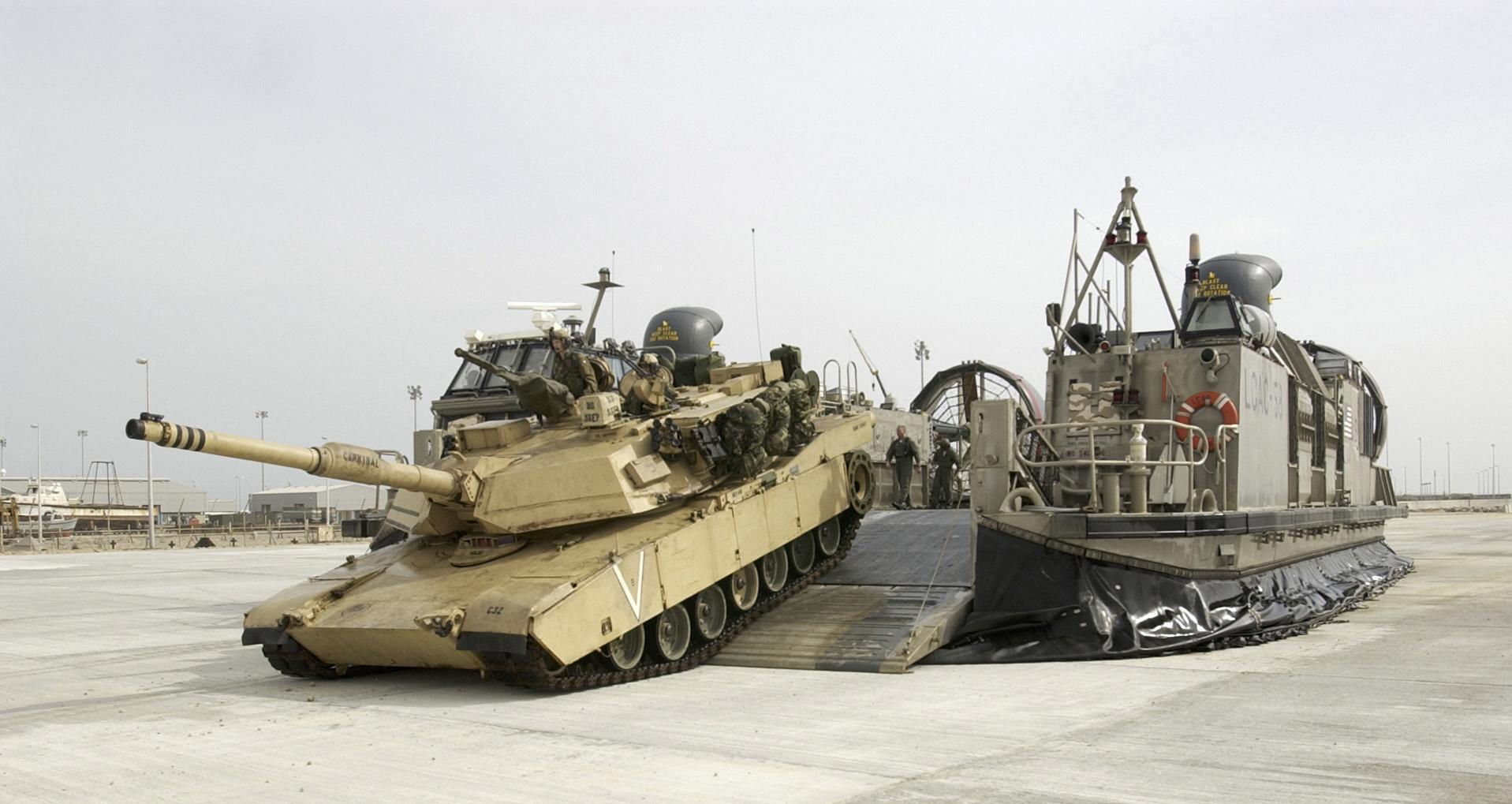
M1 Abrams offloading from Landing Craft Air Cushioned vehicle.

Tanks have high tactical mobility and can travel over most types of terrain due to their continuous tracks and advanced suspension. The tracks disperse the weight of the vehicle over a large area, resulting in less ground pressure. A tank can travel at approximately 40 kilometres per hour (25 mph) across flat terrain and up to 70 kilometres per hour (43 mph) on roads, but due to the mechanical strain this places on the vehicle and the logistical strain on fuel delivery and tank maintenance, these must be considered exceptional "burst" speeds.

Tanks are susceptible to mechanical failure of engine and transmission systems, particularly at maximum burst speeds. Consequently, wheeled tank transporters and rail transport are used wherever possible for non-combat tank transport. Tank mobility is very restricted compared to wheeled armoured fighting vehicles. Most operational mobility in blitzkrieg tank operations was conducted at the pedestrian pace of 5 kilometres per hour (3.1 mph), and that was only achieved on the roads of France.

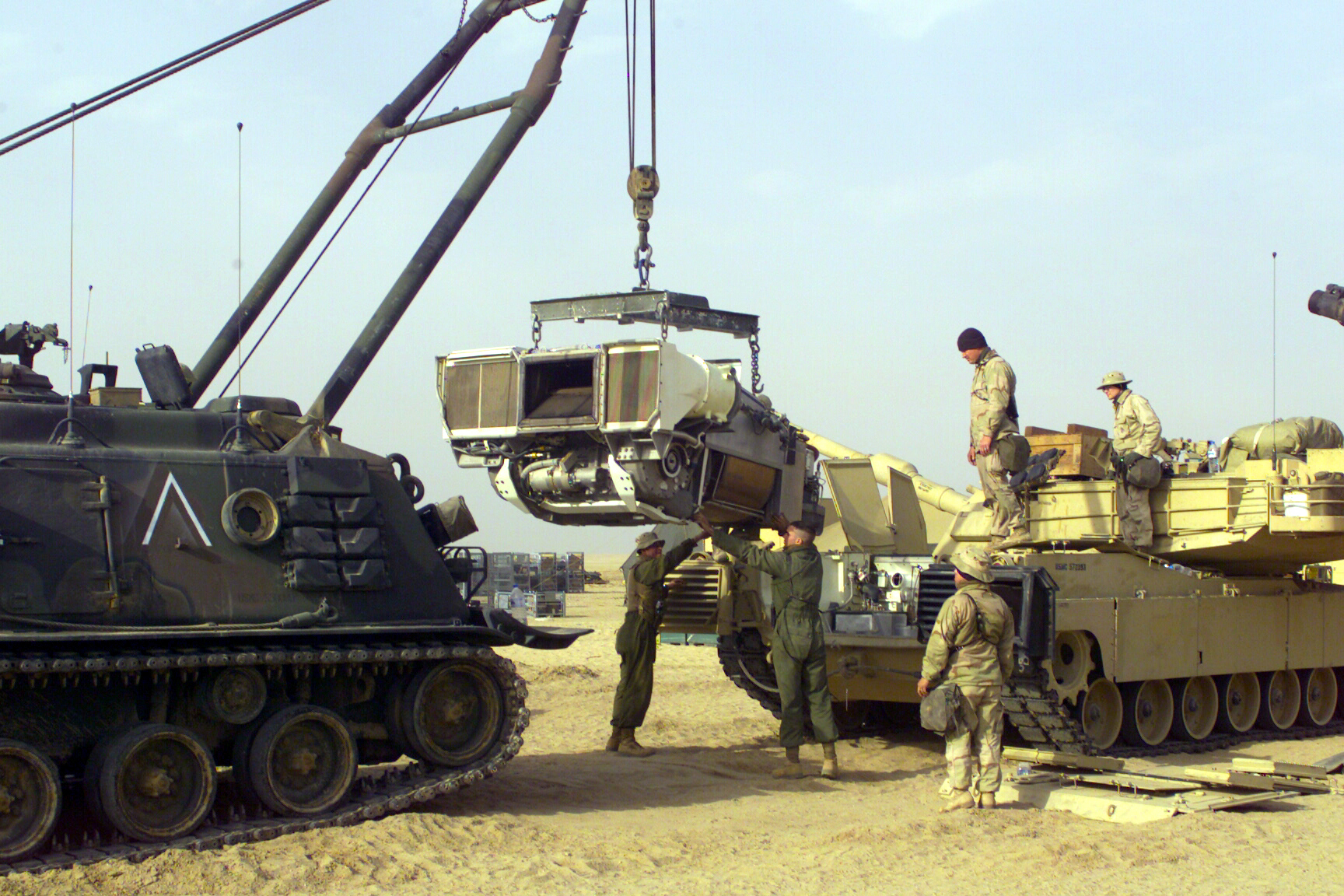
The M1 Abrams is powered by a 1,500 shaft horsepower (1,100 kW) Honeywell AGT 1500 gas turbine engine, giving it a governed top speed of 45 mph (72 km/h) on paved roads, and 30 mph (48 km/h) cross-country.

=== Suspension and running gear ===
Tank agility is a function of the weight of the tank due to its inertia while manoeuvring and its ground pressure, the power output of the installed power plant and the tank transmission and track design. In addition, rough terrain effectively limits the tank's speed through the stress it puts on the suspension and the crew. A breakthrough in this area was achieved during World War II when improved suspension systems were developed that allowed better cross-country performance and limited firing on the move. Systems like the earlier Christie or later torsion-bar suspension developed by Ferdinand Porsche dramatically improved the tank's cross-country performance and overall mobility.

=== Engine ===
The tank's power plant supplies kinetic energy to move the tank, and electric power via a generator to components such as the turret rotation motors and the tank's electronic systems.

The tank power plant evolved from predominantly petrol and adapted large-displacement aeronautical or automotive engines to diesel engines. Japan was the first to begin transitioning to this engine type beginning with the Type 89B in 1934. The main advantage of diesel is their higher fuel economy, which allows for greater operating ranges. Diesel engines can also run on a variety of fuels, such as aviation kerosene and even gasoline. Advanced multi-fuel diesel engines have been adopted. Gas turbines are powerful per unit weight but fuel-hungry; they have been used in a few tanks, including the Soviet T-80 and American M1 Abrams.

Tank power output and torque in context:
Vehicle		Power output kW (hp)	Power/weight kW/t (hp/t)	Torque N⋅m (lbf⋅ft)
Mid-sized car	Toyota Camry 2.4 L	118 (158)	79 (106)	218 (161)
Sports car	Lamborghini Murciélago 6.5 L	471 (632)	286 (383)	660 (490)
Racing car	Formula One car 3.0 L	710 (950)	1,065 (1,428)	350 (260)
Main battle tank	Leopard 2, M1 Abrams	1,100 (1,500)	18.0 to 18.3 (24.2 to 24.5)	4,700 (3,500)
Locomotive	SNCF Class T 2000	1,925 (2,581)	8.6 (11.5)	

=== Fording ===
In the absence of combat engineers, most tanks can only ford small rivers. The typical fording depth for MBTs is approximately 1 m (3.3 ft), being limited by the height of the engine air intake and driver's position. Modern tanks such as the Russian T-90 and the German Leopard 1 and Leopard 2 tanks can ford to a depth of 3 to 4 m (9.8 to 13.1 ft) when properly prepared and equipped with a snorkel to supply air for the crew and engine. Tank crews usually strongly dislike deep fording, but it adds considerable scope for surprise and tactical flexibility in water-crossing operations by opening new and unexpected avenues of attack.

Amphibious tanks are specially designed or adapted for water operations, such as by including snorkels and skirts, but they are rare in modern armies. Purpose-built amphibious assault vehicles or armoured personnel carriers are used, without tanks, in amphibious assaults. Advances such as the EFA mobile bridge and armoured vehicle-launched scissors bridges have also reduced the impediment to tank advance that rivers posed in World War II.

=== Crew ===
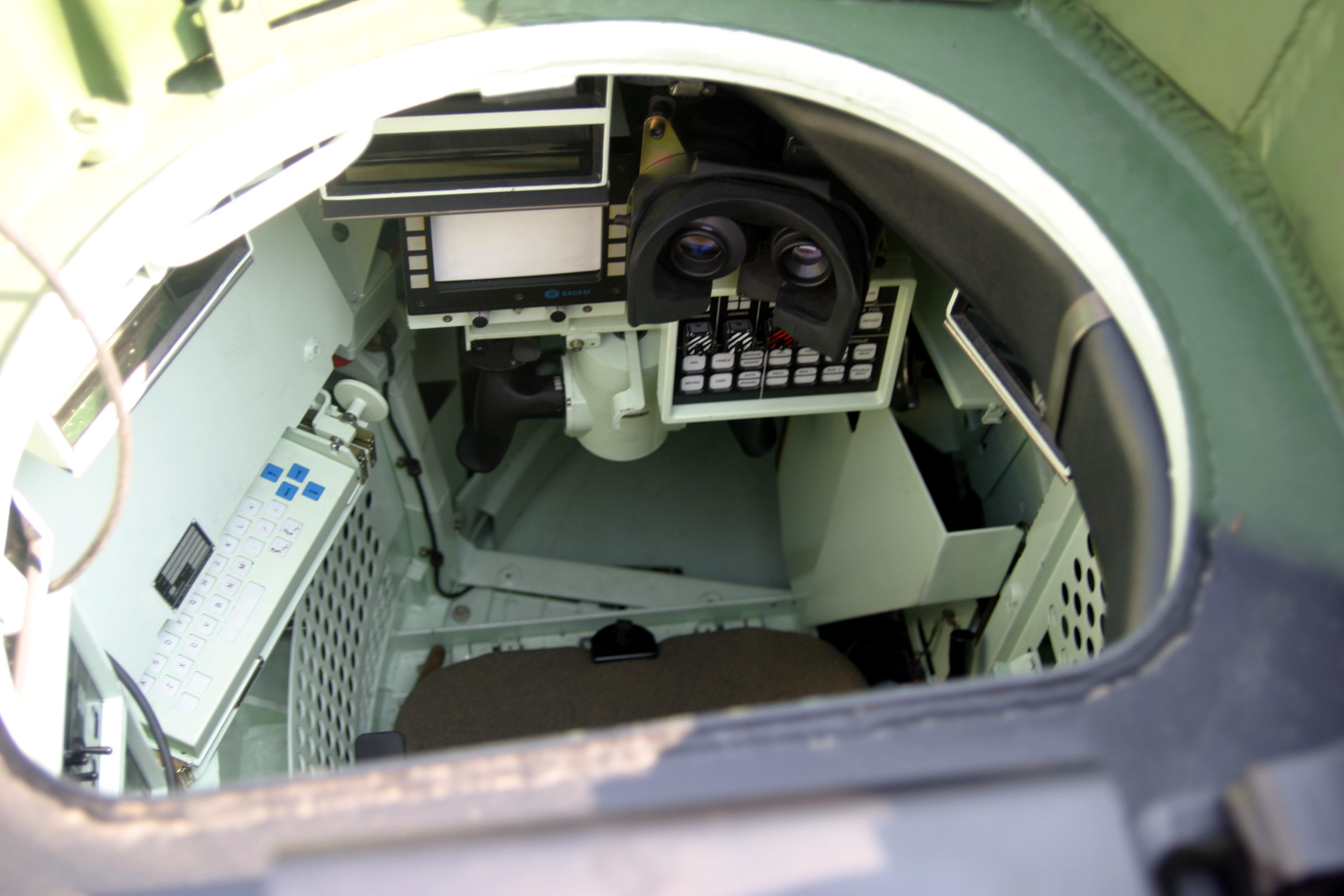
The tank commander's position in an AMX Leclerc

Positions of crew members in a Russian T-72B3 tank. The driver (3) is seated in the front, commander (1) and gunner (2) are in the turret, directly above the carousel (4), which contains the ammunition for the autoloading mechanism.

Most modern tanks most often have four crew members, or three if an auto-loader is installed. These are the:

- Commander – The commander is responsible for commanding the tank, with all-round vision devices rather than the limited vision of the driver and gunner. He guides the gunner roughly onto target and guides the driver around turns and obstacles.
- Gunner – The gunner is responsible for laying (aiming) the gun. It may be laying for direct fire, where the gun is aimed similarly to a rifle, or indirect fire, where firing data is calculated and applied to the sights. The term includes automated aiming using, for example, radar-derived target data and computer-controlled guns. Gun laying involves moving the axis of the bore of the barrel in two planes, horizontal and vertical. A gun is "traversed" (rotated in a horizontal plane) to align it with the target, and "elevated" (moved in the vertical plane) to range it to the target.
- Loader – The loader loads the gun, with a round appropriate to the target (HEAT, smoke, etc.) as ordered by either the commander or the gunner. The loader is usually the lowest-ranked member of the crew. In tanks with auto-loaders this position is omitted.
- Driver – The driver drives the tank, and also performs routine maintenance on the automotive features.

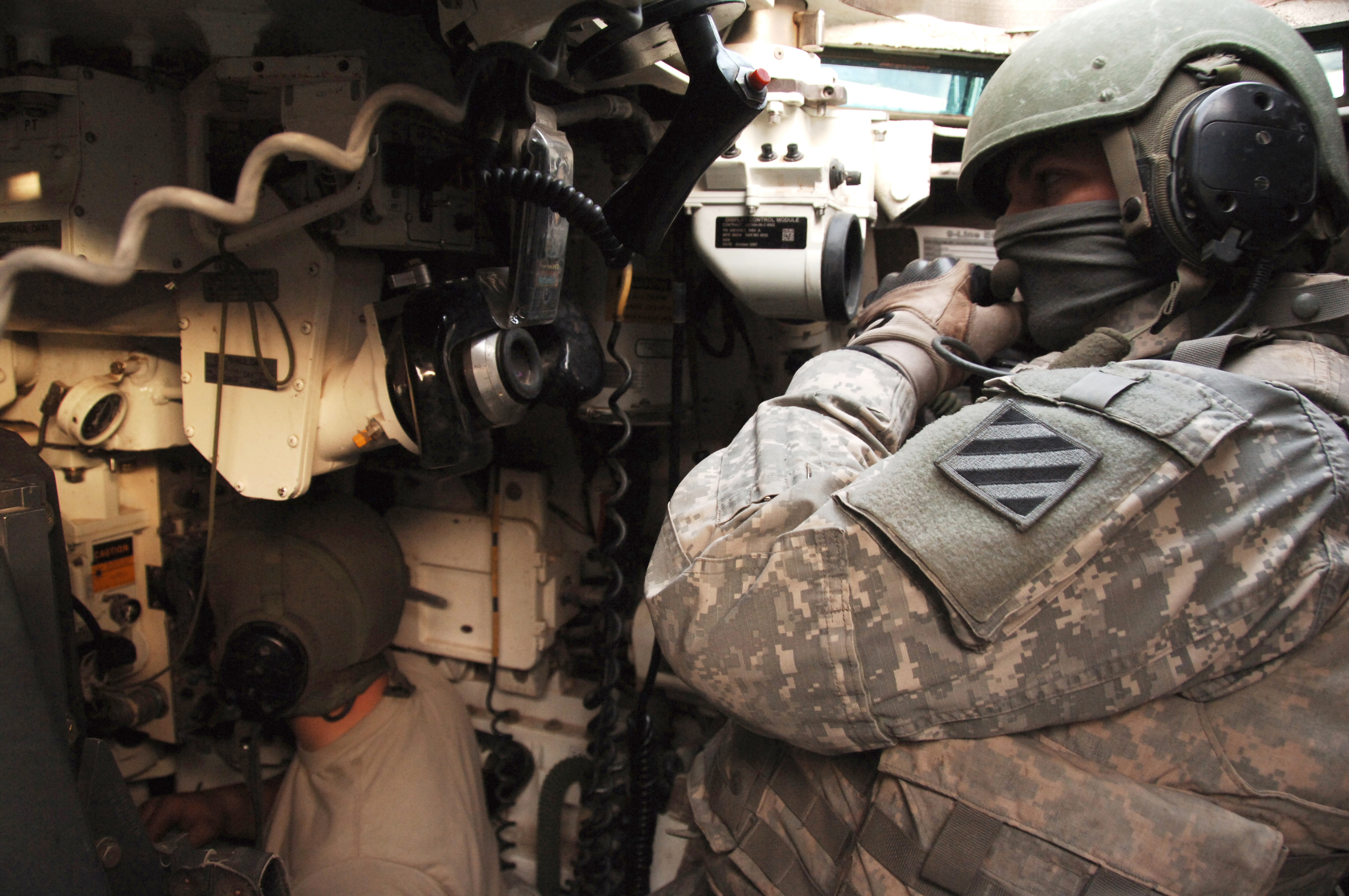
A view in a M1A1 Abrams tank of the gunner's station (bottom left) and commander's station (top right)

Operating a tank is a team effort. For example, the loader is assisted by the rest of the crew in stowing ammunition. The driver is assisted in maintaining the automotive features.

Historically, crews have varied from two to twelve members. First World War tanks carried the crew needed to man the multiple guns and machine guns, and up to four crewmen to drive the tank: the commander drove the tank and manned the brakes, steering via orders to his gears-men; a co-driver operated the gearbox and throttle; and two gears-men, one for each track, steered by setting their side to idle, allowing the track on the other side to slew the tank to one side. Pre-World War II French tanks were noted for having a two-man crew, in which the overworked commander had to load and fire the gun in addition to commanding the tank.

With World War II the multi-turreted tanks proved impracticable, and as the single turret on a low hull design became standard, crews became standardised around a crew of four or five. In those tanks with a fifth crew member, usually three were located in the turret (as described above) while the fifth was most often seated in the hull next to the driver, and operated the hull machine gun in addition to acting as a co-driver or radio operator. Well-designed crew stations, giving proper consideration to comfort and ergonomics, are important to the combat-effectiveness of a tank, as they limit fatigue and speed up individual actions.

=== Engineering constraints ===
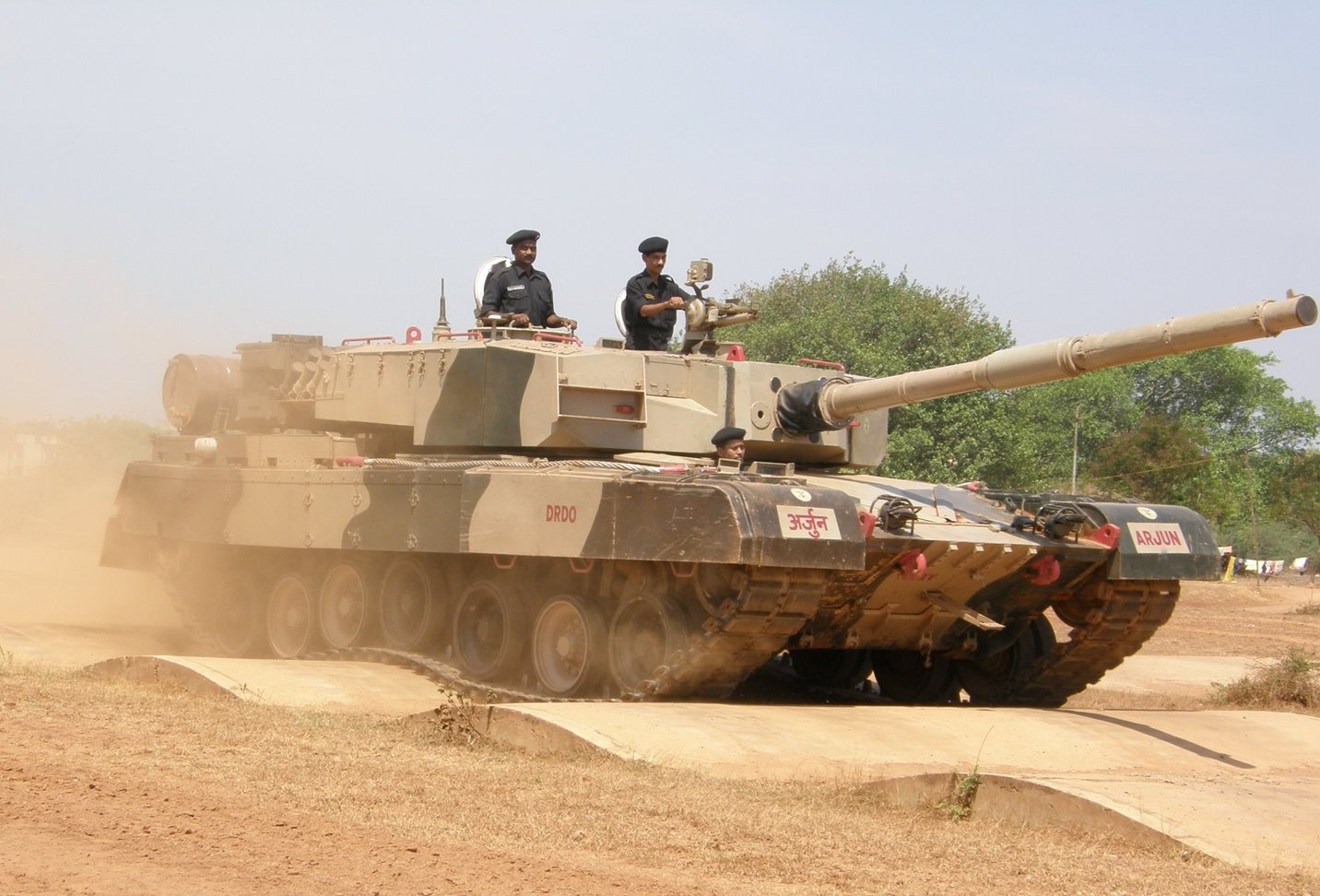
The Indian Arjun MBT's hydropneumatic suspension at work, while moving over a bump track.

A noted author on the subject of tank design engineering, Richard Ogorkiewicz, outlined the following basic engineering sub-systems that are commonly incorporated into a tank's technological development:

- Mobility (through chassis design)
- Engines
- Transmissions
- Suspensions and running gear
- Soil-vehicle mechanics
- Guns and ammunition
- Ballistics and mechanics of guns
- Vision and sighting systems
- Illuminating and night vision systems
- Fire control systems for main and auxiliary weapons
- Gun control systems
- Guided weapons
- Armour protection
- Configuration

To the above can be added unit communication systems and electronic anti-tank countermeasures, crew ergonomic and survival systems (including flame suppression), and provision for technological upgrading. Few tank designs have survived their entire service lives without some upgrading or modernisation, particularly during wartime, including some that have changed almost beyond recognition, such as the latest Israeli Magach versions.

The characteristics of a tank are determined by the performance criteria required for the tank. The obstacles that must be traversed affect the vehicle's front and rear profiles. The types of terrain specified to be traversed determine the maximum permissible track ground pressure.

Tank design is a compromise between technological and budgetary constraints and tactical capability requirements. It is not possible to maximise firepower, protection and mobility simultaneously, while also incorporating the latest technology and being economically viable. For example, in the case of tactical capability requirements, increasing protection by adding armour will result in an increase in weight and therefore decrease in mobility; increasing firepower by installing a larger gun will force the designer team to increase armour, the therefore weight of the tank by retaining same internal volume to ensure crew efficiency during combat. In the case of the Abrams MBT which has good firepower, speed and armour, these advantages are counterbalanced by its engine's notably high fuel consumption, which ultimately reduces its range, and in a larger sense its mobility. And most enhancements add to cost.

Since the Second World War the economics of tank production, governed by the complexity of manufacture and cost and the impact of a given tank design on logistics and field maintenance capabilities, have also been accepted as important in determining how many tanks a nation can afford to field in its force structure.

Some tank designs that were fielded in significant numbers, such as Tiger I and M60A2 proved to be too complex or expensive to manufacture, and made unsustainable demands on the logistics services support of the armed forces. The affordability of the design therefore takes precedence over the combat capability requirements. Nowhere was this principle illustrated better than during the Second World War when two Allied designs, the Soviet T-34 and the US M4 Sherman, although both simple designs which accepted engineering compromises, were used successfully against more sophisticated designs by Germany that were more complex and expensive to produce, and more demanding on overstretched logistics of the Wehrmacht. Given that a tank crew will spend most of its time occupied with maintenance of the vehicle, engineering simplicity has become the primary constraint on tank design since the Second World War despite advances in mechanical, electrical and electronics technologies.

Since the Second World War, tank development has incorporated experimenting with significant mechanical changes to the tank design while focusing on technological advances in the tank's many subsystems to improve its performance. However, a number of novel designs appeared, with mixed success, including the firepower of the Soviet IT-1 and T-64, and the crew protection of the Israeli Merkava and Swedish S-tank, while for decades the US's M551 remained the only light tank deployable by parachute.

== Command, control, and communications ==
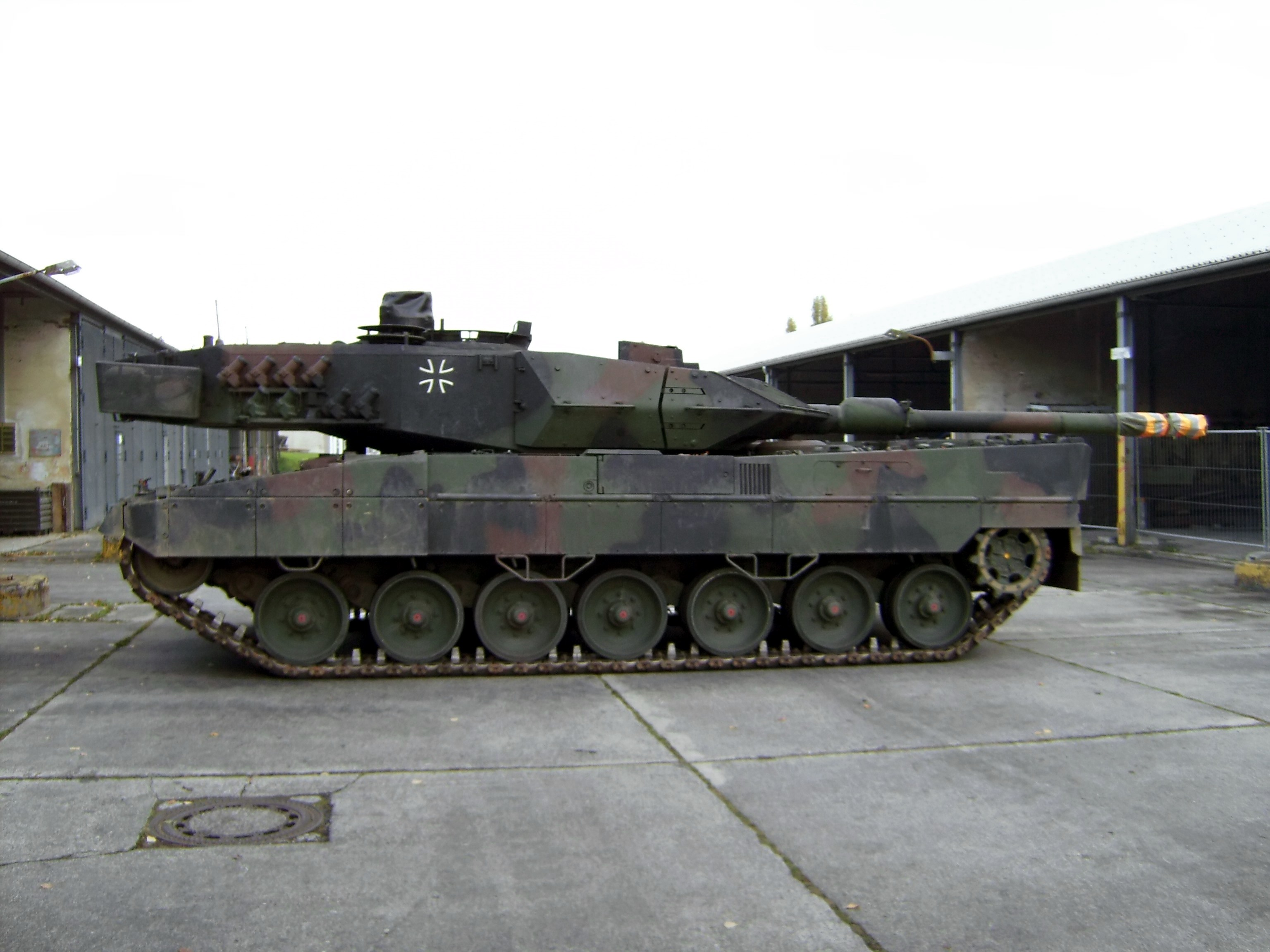
German Army Leopard 2A6M incorporates networked battlefield technology

Commanding and coordinating tanks in the field has always been subject to particular problems, particularly in the area of communications, but in modern armies these problems have been partially alleviated by networked, integrated systems that enable communications and contribute to enhanced situational awareness.

=== 20th century ===
==== World War I and Interwar period ====
Armoured bulkheads, engine noise, intervening terrain, dust and smoke, and the need to operate with hatches closed are severe detriments to communication and lead to a sense of isolation for small tank units, individual vehicles, and tank crew. Radios were not portable or robust enough to be mounted in a tank, although Morse code transmitters were installed in some Mark IVs at Cambrai as messaging vehicles. The mounting of a field telephone to the rear was not a practice. During World War I when these failed or were unavailable, situation reports were sent back to headquarters by some crews releasing carrier pigeons through loopholes or hatches and communications between vehicles was accomplished using hand signals, handheld semaphore flags which continued in use in the Red Army/Soviet Army through the Second and Cold wars, or by foot or horse-mounted messengers.

==== World War II ====
From the beginning, the German military stressed wireless communications, equipping their combat vehicles with radios, and drilled all units to rely on disciplined radio use as a basic element of tactics. This allowed them to respond to developing threats and opportunities during battles, giving the Germans a notable tactical advantage early in the war; even where Allied tanks initially had better firepower and armour, they generally lacked individual radios. By mid-war, Western Allied tanks adopted full use of radios, although Russian use of radios remained relatively limited.

==== Cold War era ====
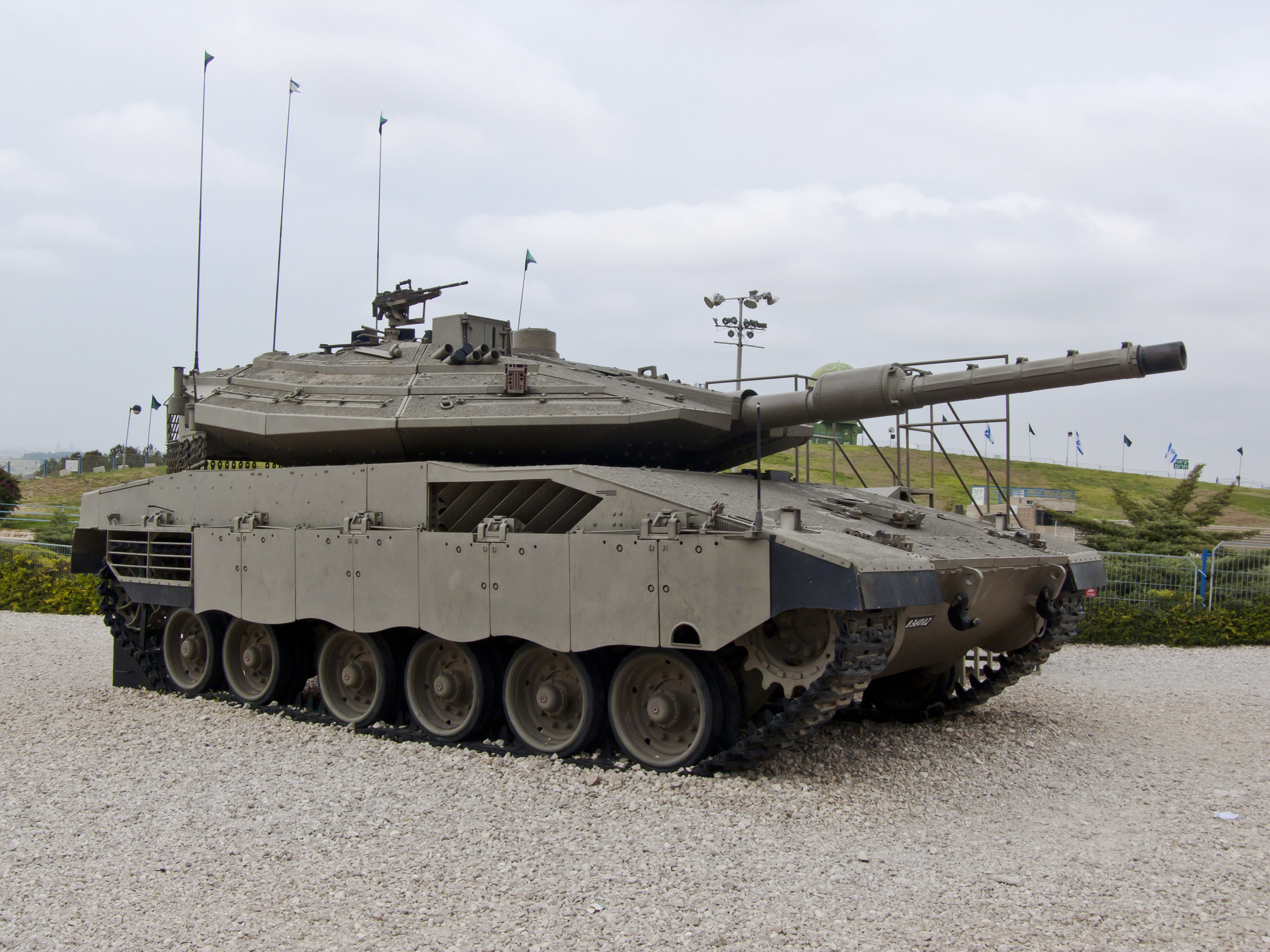
Merkava Mark 4 main battle tank is equipped with a digital C4IS battle-management system.

On the modern battlefield an intercom mounted in the crew helmet provides internal communications and a link to the radio network, and on some tanks an external intercom on the rear of the tank provides communication with co-operating infantry. Radio networks employ radio voice procedure to minimize confusion and "chatter".

A recent development in AFV equipment and doctrine is integration of information from the fire control system, laser rangefinder, Global Positioning System and terrain information via hardened military specification electronics and a battlefield network to display information on enemy targets and friendly units on a monitor in the tank. The sensor data can be sourced from nearby tanks, planes, UAVs or, in the future infantry (such as the US Future Force Warrior project). This improves the tank commander's situational awareness and ability to navigate the battlefield and select and engage targets. In addition to easing the reporting burden by automatically logging all orders and actions, orders are sent via the network with text and graphical overlays. This is known as Network-centric warfare by the US, Network Enabled Capability (UK) or Digital Army Battle Management System צי"ד (Israel). Advanced battle tanks, including the K-2 Black Panther, have taken up the first major step forward in adopting a fully radar integrated Fire Control System which allows it to detect tanks from a further distance and identify it as a friend-or-foe as well as increasing the tank's accuracy as well as its capability to lock onto tanks.

==== 21st century ====
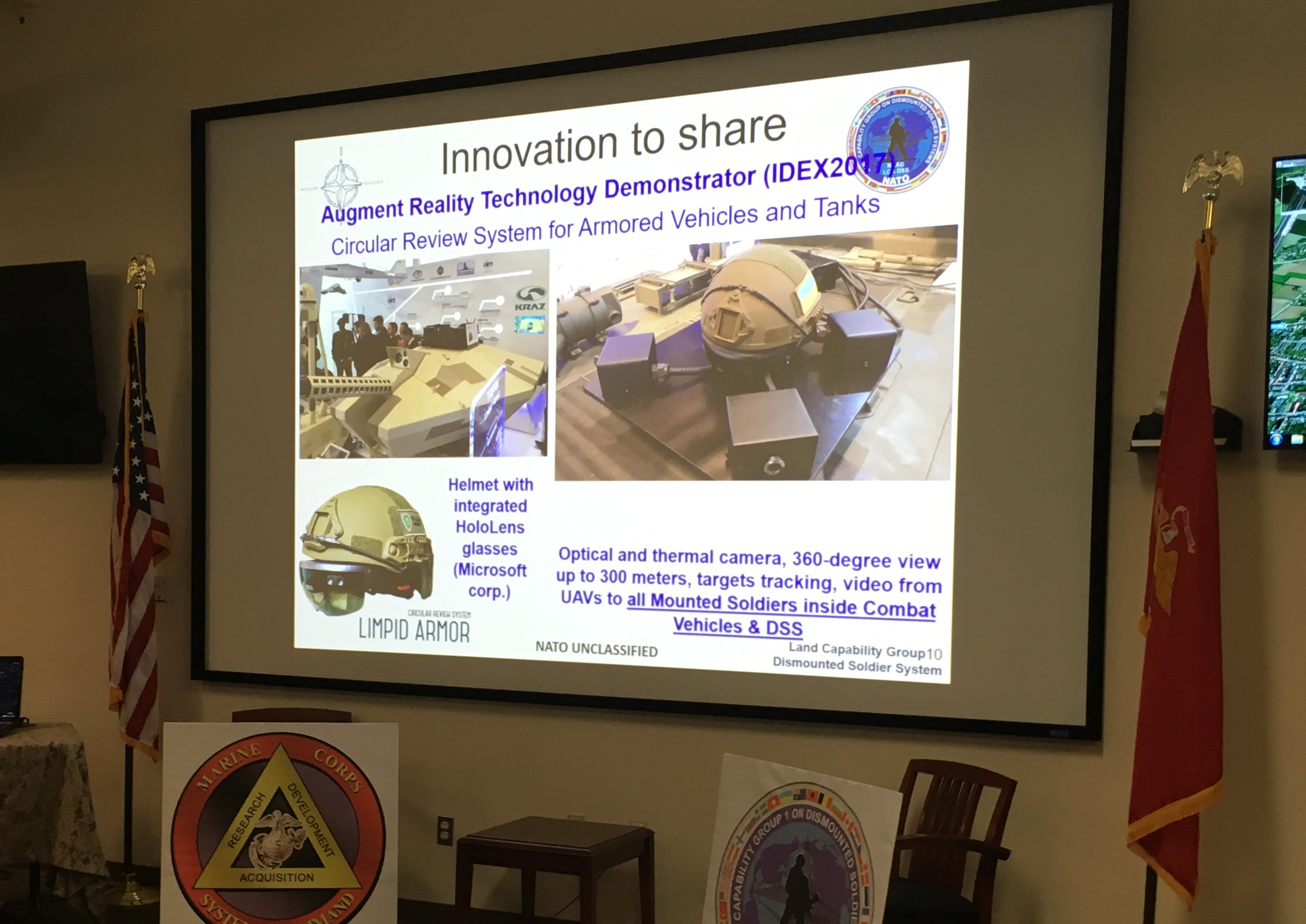
Circular review system of the company LimpidArmor

Performing situational awareness and communication is the one of four primary MBT functions in the 21st century. To improve the crew's situational awareness MBTs use circular review system with a combination of Augmented reality and Artificial Intelligence technologies.

Further advancements in tank defence systems have led to the development of active protection systems, which may be classified as either:

- Soft-kill – Soft-kill protection systems use integrated on-board radar warning receivers which can detect incoming anti-tank missiles and projectiles. Once detected, measures such as smoke screens or smoke grenades are deployed, interfering with the incoming missile's tracking system, causing it to miss the tank or to deactivate.
- Hard-kill – The more advanced approach involves destroying the incoming enemy missile or projectile by deploying anti-missile projectiles. This is seen more reliable protection.

Both these active protection systems can be found on several main battle tanks including the K2 Black Panther, the Merkava and the Leopard 2A7.

== Combat milestones ==
Conflict	Year	Total number of tanks	Notes
Battle of the Somme	1916	49	Tanks first used in battle
Battle of Cambrai	1917	378	First successful use of tanks
Second Battle of Villers-Bretonneux	1918	23	First tank vs. tank battle
Spanish Civil War	1936–1939	~700	Interwar tanks in combat
Invasion of Poland	1939	~8,000	Origin of "Blitzkrieg" term
Battle of Hannut, Belgium	1940	~1,200	First large tank vs. tank battle
Battle of France	1940	5,828	Weaker but better commanded tanks successful in combined arms operations
Battle of Kursk	1943	10,610	Most tanks in one battle
Battle of the Sinai	1973	1,200	Combat between main battle tanks

== See also ==
- Armoured recovery vehicle – Armoured vehicle for towing in combat conditions
- Armoured vehicle-launched bridge – Military engineering vehicle
- Armoured warfare – Use of armoured fighting vehicles in war
- Tanks in the Cold War
- Circular review system
- Comparison of World War I tanks
- History of the tank – Chronicle of armoured combat vehicles
- Hobart's Funnies – Modified tanks first used in the Normandy Landings
- Hull-down – Upper part of vehicle is visible, hull is not
- Infantry fighting vehicle (IFV) – Type of armored personnel carrier with direct-fire support
- List of main battle tanks by country
- List of main battle tanks by generation
- List of modern armoured fighting vehicles
- Lists of armoured fighting vehicles
- Main battle tank – Tank designed for all primary combat roles
- Military engineering vehicle – Battlefield support vehicle
- Shot trap – Tank armor deficiency
- Tank classification – Categorizing tanks by weight or role
- Tank desant – Military combined arms tactic
- Tank destroyer – Anti-tank type of armoured fighting vehicle
- Tankette – Small tracked armoured fighting vehicle
- Tanks in World War I
- Tanks in World War II
- Tanks of the interwar period – List of tanks in the Interwar Period
- Tanks of the post–Cold War era
- War wagon

== Bibliography ==
- "Electric/Hybrid Electric Drive Vehicles for Military Applications", Military Technology (9/2007), Moench Verlagsgesellschaft mbH: 132–44, September 2007
- Barris, Ted (2007), Victory at Vimy: Canada Comes of Age April 9–12, 1917, Thomas Allen Publishers, p. 116, ISBN 978-0-88762-253-3
- Cawthorne, Nigel (2003), Steel Fist: Tank Warfare 1939–45, London: Arcturus Publishing Ltd., ISBN 0-572-02872-5
- Cooper, Matthew & Lucas, James (1979), Panzer: The Armoured Force of the Third Reich, Book Club Associates
- Coox, Alvin D. (1985), Nomonhan; Japan against Russia, 1939, Stanford University Press, ISBN 0-8047-1160-7
- Deighton, Len (1979), Blitzkrieg: From the rise of Hitler to the fall of Dunkirk, Fakenham: Fakenham Press Limited, ISBN 0-224-01648-2
- DiNardo, Richard L. (January 1986), "The First Modern Tank: Gunther Burstyn and His Motorgeschutz", Military Affairs, 50 (1), JSTOR: Society for Military History: 12–15, doi:10.2307/1988528, JSTOR 1988528
- Col. Eshel, David (2007), Assessing the performance of Merkava Tanks, Defense Update
- Foley, Michael (2014), Rise of the Tank: Armoured Vehicles and their use in the First World War, Pen & Sword Military, ISBN 978-1-78346-393-0
- Forty, George (2004), Tank Warfare in World War II, London: Constable & Robinson Ltd, ISBN 1-84119-864-1
- Forty, George (2006), The World Encyclopedia of Tanks & Armoured Fighting Vehicles, Lorenz Books, ISBN 0-7548-1741-5
- Gilbert, Sir Martin (1991), Churchill: A Life, Thomas Allen Publishers, p. 298, ISBN 0-7624-2081-2
- Goldman, Stuart D. (2012), Nomonhan 1939; The Red Army's Victory That Shaped World War II, Naval Institute Press, ISBN 978-1-59114-329-1
- Hilmes, Rolf (December 2004), "Arming Future MBTs – Some Considerations", Military Technology (12/2004), Moench Verlagsgesellschaft Mbh: 4
- House, Jonathan M. (1984), Toward Combined Arms Warfare: A Survey of 20th-Century Tactics, Doctrine, and Organization, United States Government Printing, OCLC 464265702, archived from the original on 7 November 2010
- Hunnicutt, R.P. (1984), Patton: A History of the American Main Battle Tank, Presidio, ISBN 0-89141-230-1
- Komarow, Steven (29 March 2005), Tanks adapted for urban fights they once avoided, USA Today
- Komarow, Steven (29 March 2005), Tanks take a beating in Iraq, USA Today
- Koschier, Angelo V.; Mauch, Hagen R. (2000), "Advantages of the LV100 as a Power Producer in a Hybrid Propulsion System for Future Fighting Vehicles", Journal of Engineering for Gas Turbines and Power, 122 (October 2000): 693–98, doi:10.1115/1.1287585
- Manrique, Jose; Franco, Lucas M. (2006), Las Armas de la Guerra Civil Espanola (in Spanish), 28002 Madrid; La Los Libros, ISBN 84-9734-475-8
- Marcus, Jonathan (15 August 2006), "Tough lessons for Israeli armour", BBC News
- McDonald, Colin F. (1990), "Gas Turbine Recuperator Renaissance", Heat Recovery Systems & CHP, 10 (1), Pergamon Press: 1–30, doi:10.1016/0890-4332(90)90246-G
- Moore, Craig (2017), Tank Hunter World War One, The History Press, ISBN 978-0-7509-8246-7
- Pöhlmann, Markus (2016), Der Panzer und die Mechanisierung des Krieges: Eine deutsche Geschichte 1890 bis 1945, Paderborn: Ferdinand Schöningh, ISBN 978-3-506-78355-4
- Thompson, William J. & Sorvig, Kim (2000), Sustainable Landscape Construction: A Guide to Green Building Outdoors, Island Press, p. 51, ISBN 1-55963-646-7
- Flaherty, Thomas H. (1991), The armoured Fist (The New Face of War), Alexandria, Virginia: Time-Life Books, ISBN 978-0-8094-8608-3
- Chewed Up, Alexandria, Virginia: Time magazine, 5 April 1937, archived from the original on 17 February 2009
- Tomes, Robert R. (Spring 2004), "Relearning Counterinsurgency Warfare", Parameters, XXXIV (1), US Army War College: 16–28, archived from the original on 14 May 2008
- von Senger und Etterlin, Dr. F.M. (1960), The World's Armoured Fighting Vehicles, London: Macdonald & Co. (Publishers) Ltd.
- Willmott, H.P. (2003), First World War, Dorling Kindersley, ISBN 1-4053-0029-9
- Wright, Patrick (2002), Tank: The Progress of a Monstrous War Machine, Viking, ISBN 978-0-670-03070-5
- Xiaopeng, Li; Meng Tao; Zhao Chun; Li Liyi (January 2007), "Multiprojectile Active Electromagnetic armour", IEEE Transactions on Magnetics, 43 (1): 460–62, Bibcode:2007ITM....43..460L, doi:10.1109/TMAG.2006.887581, S2CID 42968381
- Zaloga, Steven J. & Grandsen, James (1984), Soviet Tanks and Combat Vehicles of World War Two, London: Arms and Armour Press, ISBN 0-85368-606-8
- Zaloga, Steven J.; Kinnear, Jim; Aksenov, Andrey; Koshchavtsev, Aleksandr (1997), Soviet Tanks in Combat 1941–45: The T-28, T-34, T-34-85, and T-44 Medium Tanks, Hong Kong: Concord Publication, ISBN 962-361-615-5
- Macksey, Kenneth (1976), Tank Warfare, A History of Tanks in Battle, London: Panther, ISBN 0-586-04302-0
- Macksey, Kenneth & Batchelor, John H. (1970), Tank: A History of the Armoured Fighting Vehicle, New York: Scribner, ISBN 0-345-02166-5
- Ogorkiewicz, Richard M. (1968), Design and Development of Fighting Vehicles, London: MacDonald, ISBN 0-356-01461-4
- Ogorkiewicz, Richard M. (1970), Armoured Forces: A History of Armoured Forces and Their Vehicles, Arms & Armour Press, ISBN 0-85368-049-3
- Ogorkiewicz, Richard M. (1991), Technology of Tanks, Coulsdon, Surrey: Jane's Information Group, ISBN 0-7106-0595-1
- Weeks, John (1975), Men Against Tanks: A History of Anti-Tank Warfare, New York: Mason Charter, ISBN 0-88405-130-7
