= Defensive aids system =

Military aircraft system

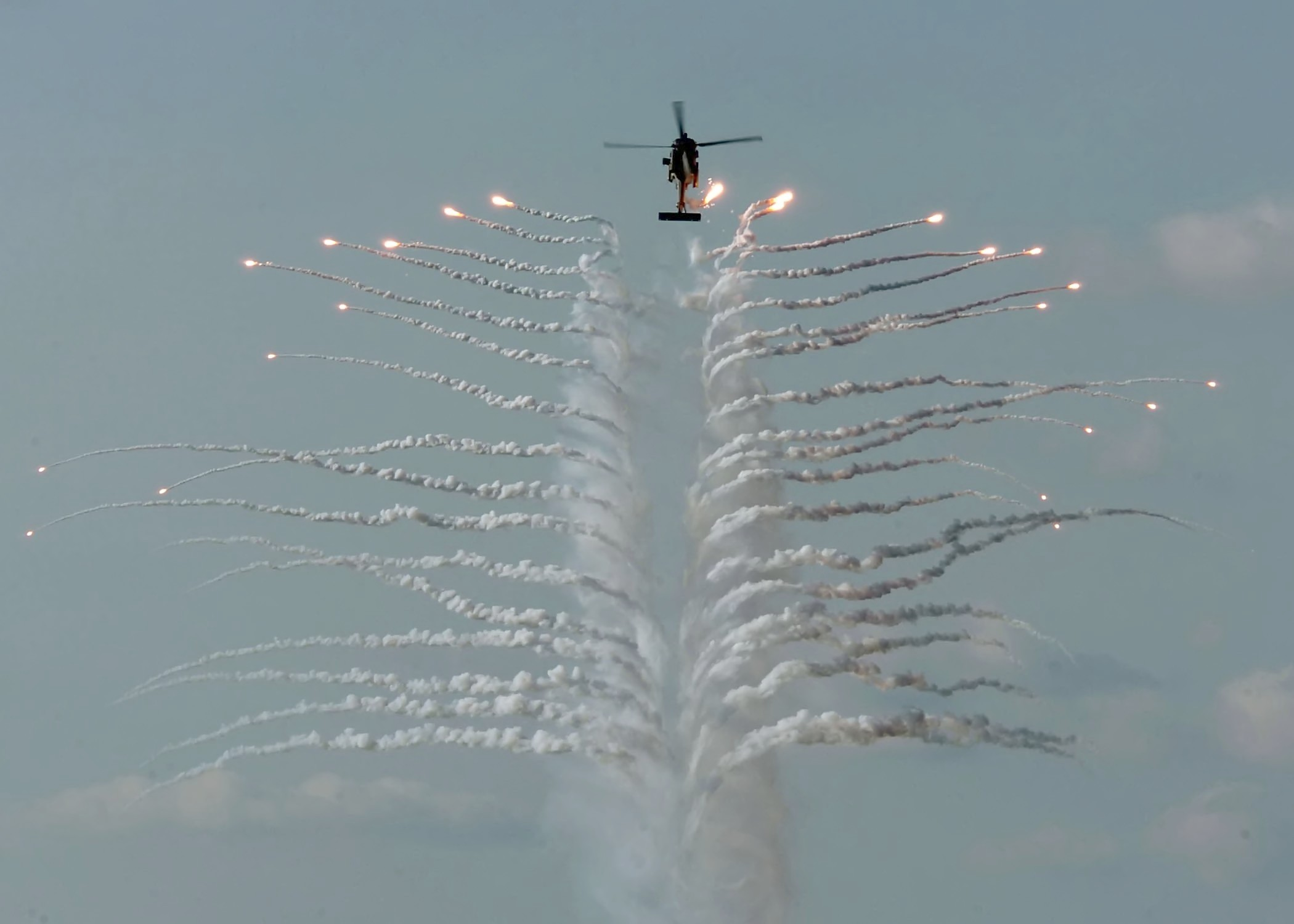
DAS of HH-60H.

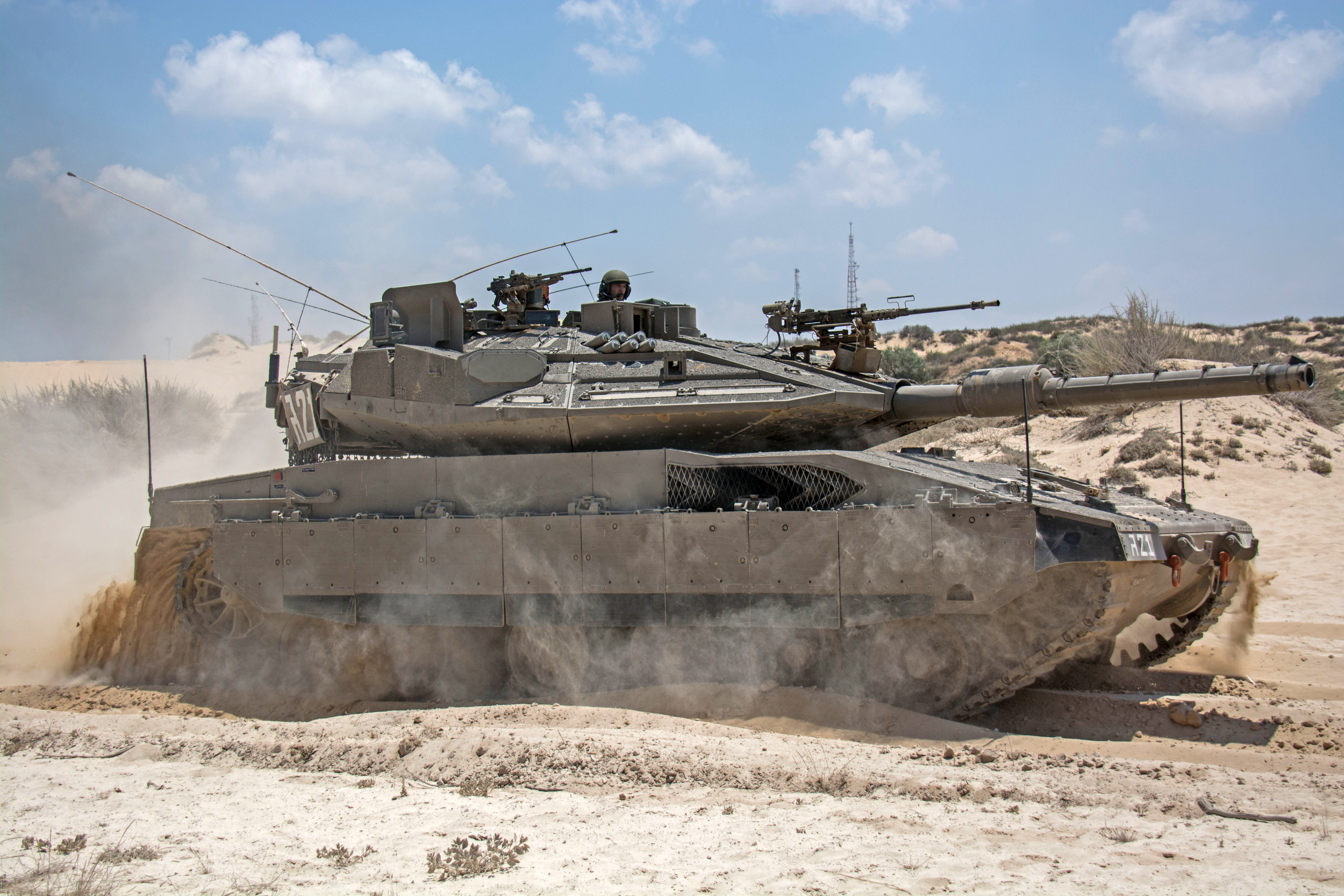
Merkava Mk IVm with DAS Trophy.

A defensive aide suite (DAS) is a military aircraft system which defends it from attack by surface-to-air missiles, air-to-air missiles and guided anti-aircraft artillery. A DAS typically comprises chaff, flares, and electronic countermeasures combined with radar warning receivers to detect threats. On some modern aircraft (Lockheed Martin F-35 Lightning II), the entire system is integrated and computer-controlled, allowing an aircraft to autonomously detect, classify and act in an optimal manner against a potential threat to its safety.

A Defensive Aid Suite (DAS) system can be used in conjunction with the NGVA architecture in combat vehicles as well.

== See also ==
- Active protection system
- Drozd – The first attempt at making an active protection system by the Soviet Union.
  - Arena – An updated and more effective version of Drozd.
- Zaslon – Ukrainian DAS for use on BM Oplot tanks.
- Iron Fist – Another Israeli active protection system developed by Israel Military Industries.
- Trophy (countermeasure)
