= Close-in weapon system =

Type of point-defense weapon system

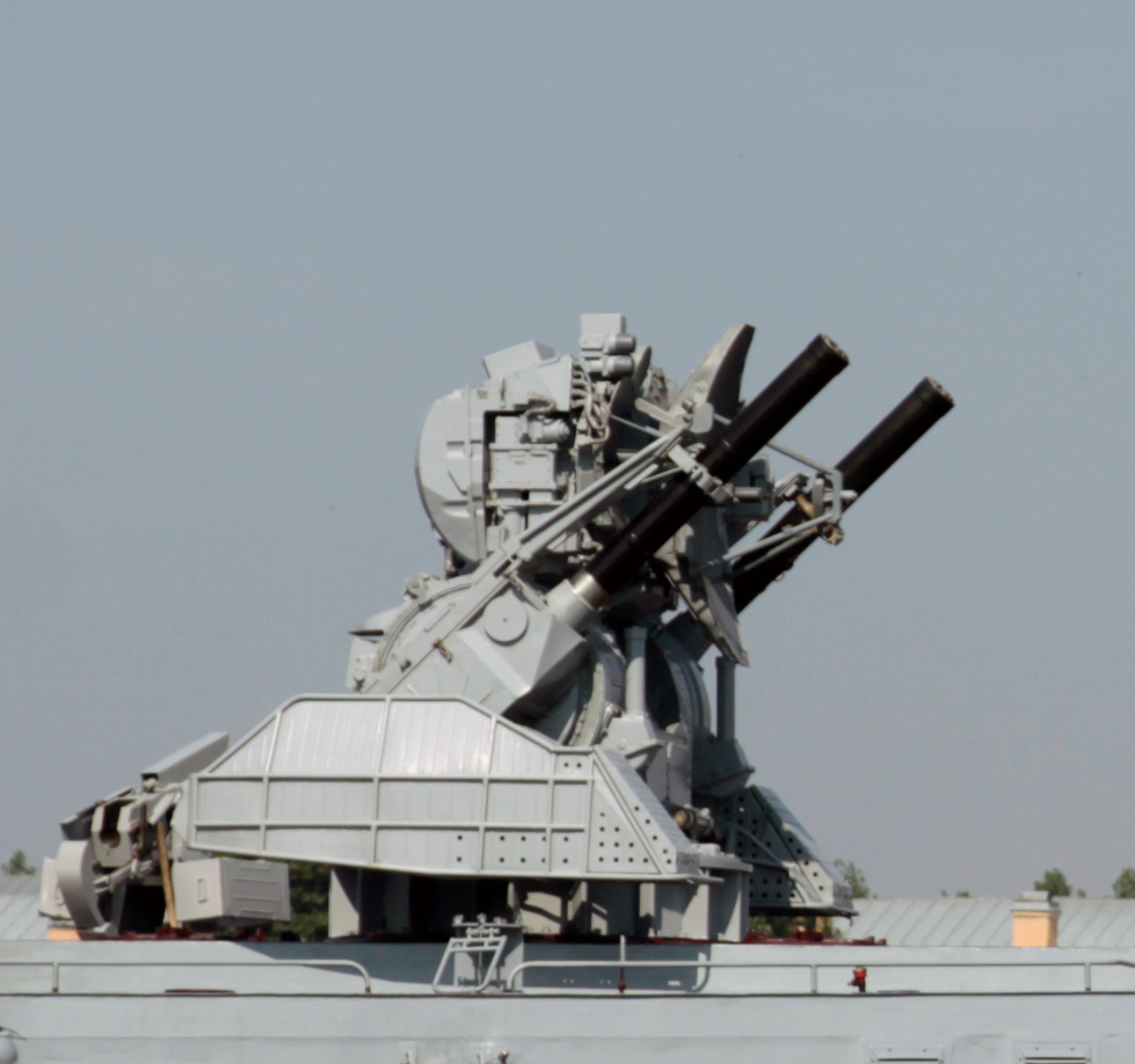
Kashtan CIWS (missiles absent)

A close-in weapon system (CIWS /ˈsiːwɪz/ SEE-wiz) is a point-defense weapon system for detecting and destroying short-range incoming missiles and enemy aircraft which have penetrated the outer defenses, typically mounted on a naval ship. Nearly all classes of larger modern warships along with many other warships are equipped with some kind of CIWS device.

There are mainly three types of CIWS: gun-based CIWS, missile-based CIWS, and hybrid gun- and missile-based CIWS. A gun-based CIWS usually consists of a combination of radars, computers, and rapid-firing multiple-barrel rotary cannons placed on a rotating turret. Missile-based CIWSs use either infra-red, passive radar/ESM, or semi-active radar terminal guidance to guide missiles to the targeted enemy aircraft or other threats. In some cases, CIWS are used on land to protect military bases. In this case, the CIWS can also protect the base from shell and rocket fire.

== Gun systems ==
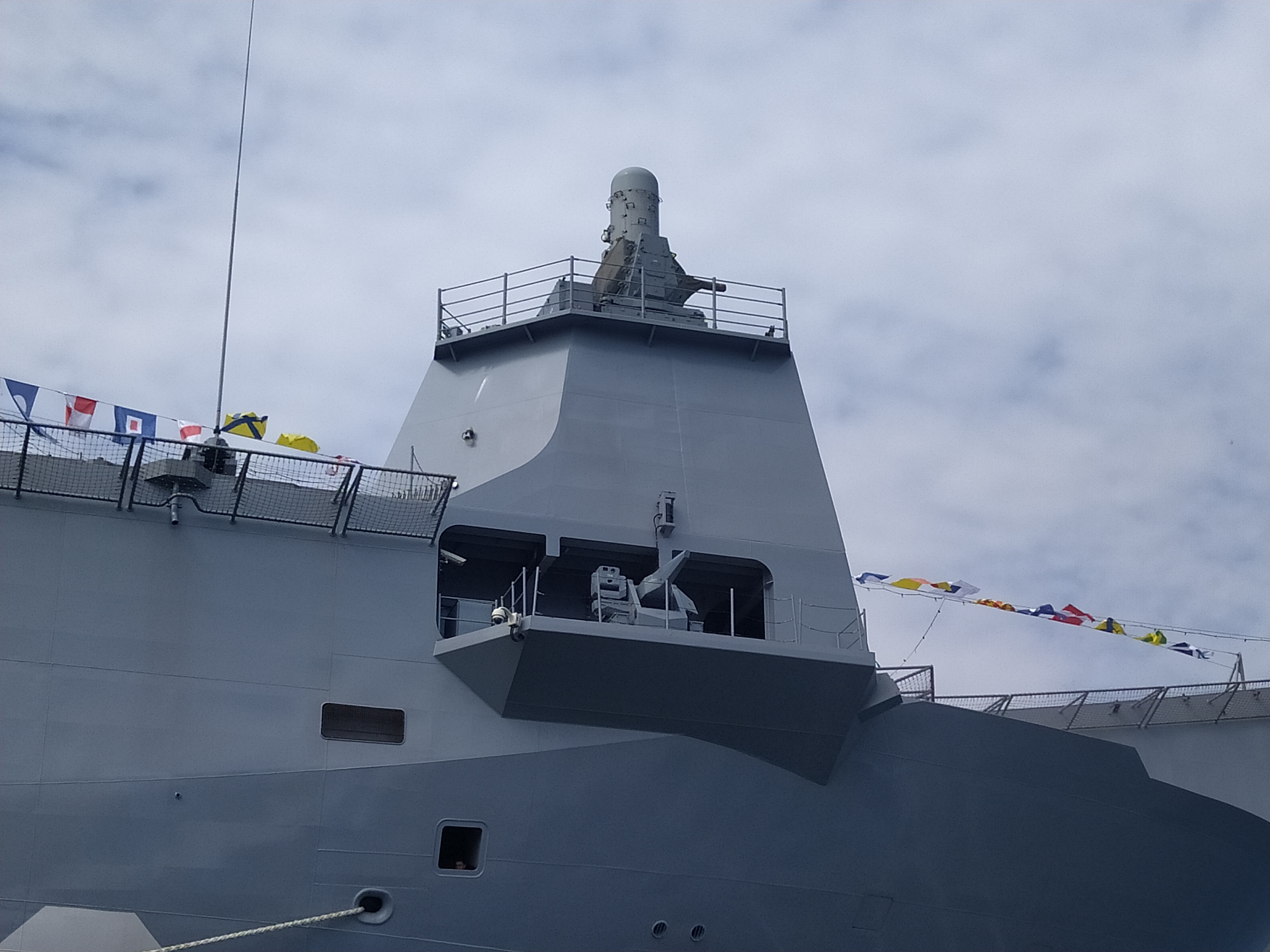
Phalanx CIWS and Aselsan STOP RCWS aboard the TCG ship Anadolu

A gun-based CIWS usually consists of a combination of radars, computers and rotary or revolver cannon placed on a rotating, automatically aimed gun mount. Examples of gun-based CIWS products in operation are:

- AK-630, 630M, 306, 630M1-2, and 630M2 - 30×165mm caliber
- Aselsan GOKDENIZ and GOKDENIZ ER - 35×228mm
- Bofors 40 Mk3 - 40×365mmR
- Bofors 40 Mk4 - 40×365mmR
- Bofors 57 mm Mk3 - 57×438mmR
- DARDO and Fast Forty - 40×365mmR
- Denel 35mm Dual Purpose Gun - 35×228mm
- Goalkeeper CIWS - 30×173mm
- Kashtan CIWS and M variant - 30×165mm
- Leonardo Lionfish 30 - 30×173mm
- Leonardo OTO Marlin 40 - 40×365mmR
- Leonardo 76/62 Sovraponte Super Rapid - 76×636mmR
- Mauser BK-27 - 27×145 mm
- Meroka CIWS - 20×128mm
- Myriad CIWS - 25×184mm
- PIT-Radwar OSU-35K - 35×228mm
- Oerlikon Sea Zenith - 25×184mm
- Rheinmetall Oerlikon Millennium Gun - 35×228mm
- Rheinmetall Sea Snake 30 mm - 30×173mm
- Phalanx CIWS Block 0, 1, 1A, and 1B - 20×102mm
- Type 730 and Type 1130 CIWS - 30×165mm

=== Limitations of gun systems ===
CIWS systems are short range: the maximum effective range of gun systems is about 5,000 metres (16,000 ft); systems with lighter projectiles have even shorter range. The expected real-world kill-distance of an incoming anti-ship missile is about 500 m (1,600 ft) or less, still close enough to cause damage to the ship's sensor or communication arrays, or to wound or kill exposed personnel. Thus some CIWS like Russian Kashtan and Pantsir systems are augmented by installing the close range surface-to-air missiles on the same mounting for increased tactical flexibility.

They have a limited kill probability compared to other anti-air guns. Even if the missile is hit and damaged, this may not be enough to destroy it entirely or to alter its course. Even in the case of a direct hit, the missile or fragments from it may still impact the intended target, particularly if the final interception distance is short. This is especially true if the gun fires kinetic-energy-only projectiles.

=== Comparison table ===
Comparison
	DARDO	Goalkeeper	Kashtan	Millennium	Phalanx	Type 730	Gökdeniz	OSU-35K
Origin	Italy	Netherlands	Russia	Germany	United States	China	Turkey	Poland
Image								
Weight	5,500 kg (12,100 lb)	9,902 kg (21,830 lb)	15,500 kg (34,200 lb)	3,300 kg (7,300 lb)	6,200 kg (13,700 lb)	9,800 kg (21,600 lb)	?	3,300 kg (7,300 lb)
Armament	40 mm (1.6 in) 2 barreled Bofors 40 mm	30 mm (1.2 in) 7 barreled GAU-8 Gatling Gun	x2 30 mm (1.2 in) 6 barreled GSh-6-30 rotary auto cannon 8 × 9M311K + 32 missiles	35 mm (1.4 in) 1 barreled Oerlikon Millennium 35 mm Naval Revolver Gun System	20 mm (0.79 in) 6 barreled M61 Vulcan Gatling Gun	30 mm (1.2 in) 7 barreled Gatling Gun	35 mm (1.4 in) 2 barreled Oerlikon 35 mm twin cannon	35 mm (1.4 in) 1 barreled Oerlikon KDA autocannon
Rate of fire	600/900 rounds per minute	4,200 rounds per minute	10,000 rounds per minute (5,000 per gun) 1–2 (salvo) missiles per 3–4 sec	200/1000 rounds per minute	4,500 rounds per minute	5,800 rounds per minute	1,100 rounds per minute (550 per gun)	550 rounds per minute
(effective/ flat-trajectory) Range	4,000 m (13,000 ft)	3,500 m (11,500 ft)	Missiles: 1,500–10,000 m (4,900–32,800 ft); Guns: 300–5,000 m (980–16,400 ft)	3,500 m (11,500 ft)	2,000 m (6,600 ft)	3,000 m (9,800 ft)	ATOM 35mm: 4,000 metres (13,000 ft)	FAPDS: 5,000 m (16,000 ft) ABM: 3,500 m (11,500 ft)
Ammunition storage	736 rounds	1,190 rounds	2 × 2,000 rounds	252 rounds	1,550 rounds	640 or 2 × 500 rounds (depending on model)	?	2 × 100 rounds
Muzzle velocity	1,000 m (3,300 ft) per second	1,109 m (3,638 ft) per second	960–1100 m/s (3,150-3,610 ft/s)	1,050 m (3,440 ft) per second / 1,175 m (3,855 ft) per second	1,100 m (3,600 ft) per second	1,100 m (3,600 ft) per second	1,020 m/s (3,300 ft/s)	FAPDS: 1,440 m/s (4,700 ft/s) ABM: 1,050 m/s (3,400 ft/s)
Elevation	−13 to +85 degrees	−25 to +85 degrees	?	−15 to +85 degrees	−25 to +85 degrees	−25 to +85 degrees	?	−10 to +85 degrees
Speed in elevation	60 degrees per second	100 degrees per second	50 degrees per second	70 degrees per second	115 degrees per second	100 degrees per second	?	?
Traverse	360 °	360 °	360 °	360 °	360 °	360 °	360 °	360 °
Speed in traverse	90 degrees per second	100 degrees per second	70 degrees per second	120 degrees per second	115 degrees per second	100 degrees per second	?	?
In service	?	1980	1989	2003	1980	2007	2019	2022

== Missile systems ==
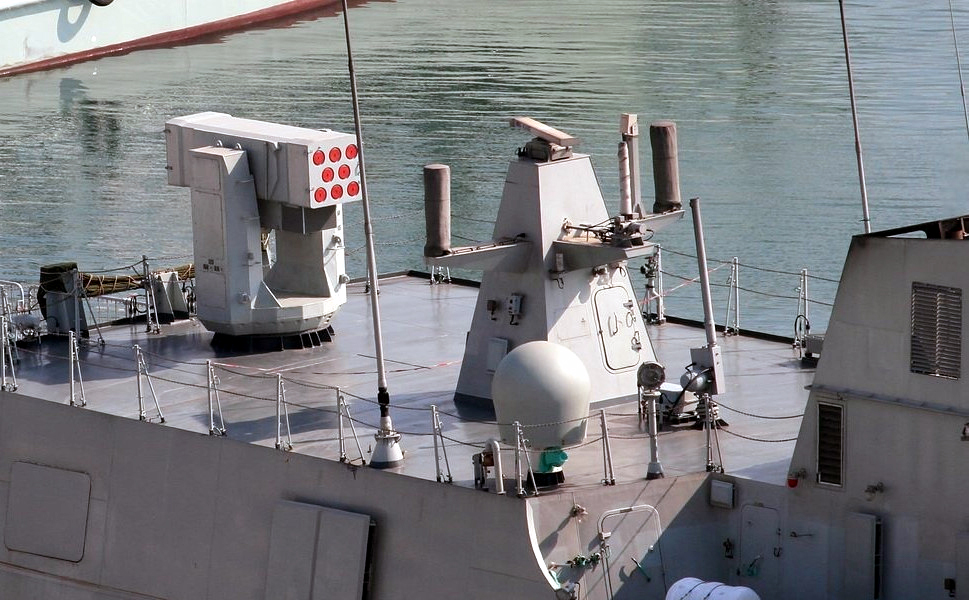
A HHQ-10 8-round launcher on a Type 056 corvette

A missile-based CIWS comprises a combination of radars and computers connected to either a rotating, automatically aimed launcher mount or vertical launching system. Examples of missile-based CIWS in operational service are:

- 9M337 Sosna-R
- Barak 1
- GÖKSUR (Turkey)
- HHQ-10 / FL-3000N (China)
- Levent (Turkey)
- RIM-116 Rolling Airframe Missile (USA)
- Mistral-3 ship-based remotely controlled variants (France)
- Sea Oryx (Taiwan)
- Tor missile system

== Hybrid gun-missile systems ==
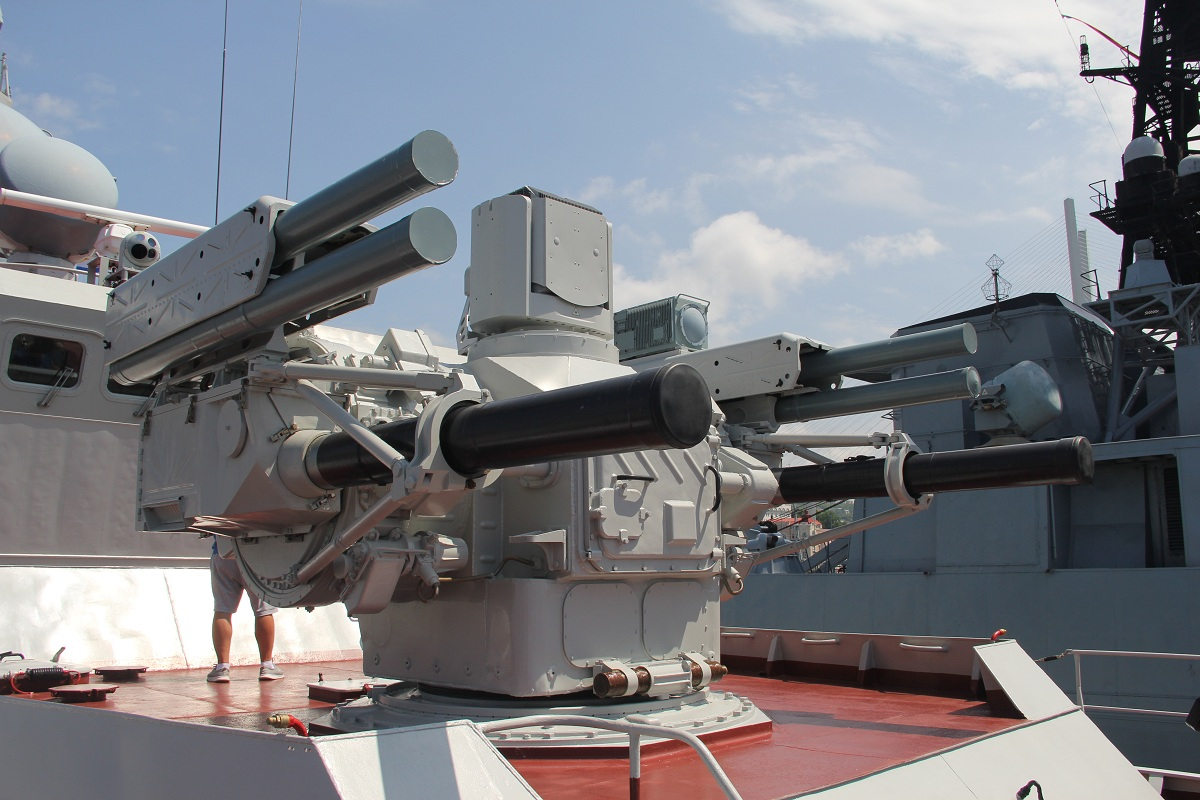
Similar to Kashtan CIWS and Pantsir-M, the Russian-designed Palma CIWS is also a combination of rapid-firing rotary cannons and short-range surface-to-air missiles such as the 9M337 Sosna-R.

Examples of gun-missile-based CIWS in operational service are:

- Kortik / Kashtan CIWS
- Pantsir-M missile system
- PLB-625

== Land-based ==
CIWS are also used on land in the form of Pantsir and C-RAM. On a smaller scale, active protection systems are used in some tanks (to destroy rocket propelled grenades (RPGs), and several are in development. The Drozd system was deployed on Soviet Naval Infantry tanks in the early 1980s, but later replaced by explosive reactive armour. Other systems that are available or under development are the Russian Arena, Israeli Trophy and Iron Fist APS, American Quick Kill and South African-Swedish LEDS-150.

== Laser systems ==
Laser-based CIWS systems are being researched. In August 2014 an operational prototype was deployed to the Persian Gulf aboard USS Ponce. The Scientific and Technological Research Council of Turkey (Turkish: Türkiye Bilimsel ve Teknolojik Araştırma Kurumu, TÜBİTAK) is the second organisation after the US to have developed and tested a High Power Laser CIWS prototype System which is intended to be used on the TF-2000 class frigate and on Turkish airborne systems.
