= Quick Kill =

Type of active protection system

- Place of origin: United States

Production history
- Designer: Raytheon

Specifications

Quick Kill is an active protection system (APS) designed to destroy incoming anti-tank missiles, rockets, and grenades. The Quick Kill system is designed and produced by Raytheon for the U.S. Army. The Quick Kill system was part of the United States Army's Future Combat Systems.

== Design ==
Quick Kill takes out an RPG in a test in October 2007

Quick Kill detects incoming RPGs and anti-tank missiles with an active electronically scanned array radar. Once its speed, trajectory, and intercept point are computed, Quick Kill vertically launches a small countermeasure missile. This kind of system is similar to the one that the Israeli Army uses for its ground forces. The system features two types of missiles: a smaller one for defense against close range weapons such as RPGs, and another, larger one to intercept longer range, faster anti-tank missiles or shells. The countermeasure missile intercepts the incoming threat and destroys it with a focused blast warhead. The Quick Kill missile has 360-degree capability and a reload capability, with each launcher typically containing 4 missiles. It can be used stationary or on the move with a wide range of vehicles from armored personnel carriers to airborne helicopters. It is likely that the Humvee or JLTV would not be suitable for the Quick Kill APS, due to the blast pressures generated when the incoming warhead detonates, which is likely to buckle lightly armored vehicles. The system's vertical launch countermeasure is unique in its ability to engage threats fired from any angle or elevation, providing all weather, full 360-degree hemispherical vehicle and crew protection with each countermeasure. The system has demonstrated its ability to defeat multiple threat types by defeating two simultaneous threats. Strengths of the Quick Kill include its reliable radar and interceptors that launch upward before diving, directing their blasts downward rather than sideways, reducing the chance of wounding accompanying troops; however, being basically a miniaturized missile defense system, the system is expensive and complex.

== Testing ==
On Feb 8, 2006, Raytheon issued a press release stating that their "Quick Kill System [was] the first active protection system (APS) to destroy a rocket propelled grenade (RPG) at close range, using a precision launched warhead with a focused blast" during live fire testing done the day before. However, this was not the first time an Active Protection System (APS) successfully engaged an incoming munition. The Soviet Drozd active protection system was equipped to Soviet tanks in the early 1980s, and saw significant use in the Soviet–Afghan War on older model tanks. Later, during a 1995 special armor conference in Kubinka, a Soviet T-72 tank fitted with an updated version of APS (most likely the Arena Active Protection System) protected against KONKURS ATGMs and RPG-type weapons.

== Controversy ==
There was some controversy when the United States Office of Force Transformation (OFT) planned to battle-test the more mature, but Israeli-made Trophy active protection system on several Stryker armored personnel carriers headed for Iraq in early 2007. The effort was scuttled by the US Army in favor of waiting for the Quick Kill system to be developed. In 2006–2007, the Institute for Defense Analysis found Quick Kill to be relatively immature and had significant development risks. Important components such as the radar were not yet fully developed and testing of the system as a whole was on hold while the warhead was redesigned. They also found Trophy, which uses a shotgun-like kill mechanism, to be the most mature of the 15 systems they analyzed.

== Status ==
According to a U.S. Government Accountability Office report issued June 8, 2007, the Army estimated that Quick Kill could be available for prototype delivery to current force vehicles in fiscal year 2009 and tested on an FCS vehicle in 2011. Maj. Gen. Jeffrey Sorenson, a top Army acquisition official, testified to Congress that Quick Kill would be ready to "hang on a vehicle in about 2008" and that the Army was already beginning to do integration work to put the system on the Stryker; this was roughly the same time frame as Trophy. Sorenson also said they were concerned about Trophy's high weight, high power draw, lack of reload capability (which it now has), lack of 360 degree protection (also a problem that was taken care of), and higher probability of collateral damage to civilians. Raytheon reported May 22, 2007 that it had delivered its radar on time and on budget. Jane's Defence Weekly reported on Oct 18, 2007 that the US Army had ordered design changes to the Quick Kill system after some rocket motors in an APS interceptor showed 'splittage' in recent testing that summer.

In December 2012, the Quick Kill active protection system defeated an extended set of threats, including one of the most lethal RPG threats by destroying it in mid-flight. The system used the same radar technology that warns Forward Operating Bases of incoming rocket and mortar attacks. The testing is in preparation for formal government evaluations in early 2013 to demonstrate the system's unique RPG-defeat capabilities.
