= Majak =

Majak may refer to:

== Places ==
- Mij, Fars, or Mājak, a town in Iran

== People ==
=== Surname ===
- Achok Majak (born 1992), American model
- David Majak (born 2000), South Sudanese footballer
- Rudolf Deng Majak (1940–2017), Sudanese and South Sudanese Roman Catholic bishop
- Simon Mijok Majak, South Sudanese politician
- Sławomir Majak (born 1969), Polish football manager and former player

=== Given name ===
- Majak Daw (born 1991), Sudanese-born Australian rules footballer
- Majak Mawith (born 1999), South Sudanese footballer

== See also ==
- Maiak (disambiguation)
- Mayak (disambiguation)
