= KAPS (countermeasure) =

Korean Active Protection System 한국형 능동방호체계
- Type: Hard-kill active protection system
- Place of origin: South Korea

Production history
- Designer: Agency for Defense Development (system); Hanwha Thales (interceptor grenade)
- Designed: 2006-2011
- Manufacturer: Hanwha Systems

Specifications
- Mass: 3.5 kg (interceptor grenade)
- Caliber: 100 mm (interceptor grenade)
- Muzzle velocity: 120 m/s (interceptor grenade)
- Effective firing range: 10 m to 15 m

- KAPS
- Hangul: 한국형 능동방호체계
- Hanja: 韓國型能動防護體系
- RR: Hangukhyeong neungdong bangho chegye
- MR: Han'gukhyŏng nŭngdong pangho ch'egye

The KAPS (Korean Active Protection System; Korean: 한국형 능동방호체계) is an active protection system developed by the Agency for Defense Development (ADD) and Hanwha Thales (now Hanwha Systems) for K2 Black Panther in 2011. It was decided to introduce a hard-kill active protection system to strengthen the survival of South Korean main battle tanks (MBT), and the development was completed under the leadership of ADD from 2006 to December 2011.

== Design ==
The KAPS is a hard-kill active protection system that instantly destroys an enemy’s incoming anti-tank guided missile (ATGM) or rocket projectile targeted at a tank by counter-firing at it using its detection and tracking data, and can significantly improve the survivability of main battle tank. Unlike the guided disturbance type soft-kill active protection system, it consists of two search and tracking radars, two IR trackers, one fire control computer, two grenade launchers and four interceptor grenades.

Based on the location, distance, and speed information of the approaching rocket or missile, FMCW radar and laceration trackers calculate detection and tracking information, and based on this, the fire control computer controls threat judgment and countermeasure to issue a countermeasure command with a grenade launcher. The FMCW radar detects rockets and AGTM flying 100 to 150 meters from the tank, and when the projectile approaches 10 to 15 meters near the tank, it fires 100 mm of grenade from the grenade launcher to neutralize the projectile.

The initial design of KAPS considered the development of a method consisting of a ring-shaped grenade launcher and a closed type cylindrical shaped grenade launcher that can fire two 100 mm grenades. Since then, to protect the grenade and reduce the weight of the grenade launcher, the design has been changed to an open type launcher with a grenade connected to the ignition plug in a cylindrical tube fixed to the ring.

The grenade launcher is designed to move in a two-axis manner and can fire grenades within the range of 60 degrees above and below. 2 grenade launchers capable of firing 100 mm grenades aim in the same direction to prepare for the threat of successive rockets to the tank or the attack of AGTM.

=== Improvements ===
In July 2023, the Defense Acquisition Program Administration (DAPA)'s tank division began work to improve the system as part of K2's product improvement program (K2 PIP). The newly improved KAPS for combat in changing urban environments will be a combined active protection system to counter ATGM and drone attacks. Research and development is currently underway at the Agency for Defense Development and sources claim the improved KAPS has lower production costs than the KAPS-2, which was developed based on the Israeli Trophy APS adopted in the export variant K2EX.

== Installation test ==
ADD and DAPA conducted the test of KAPS in February 2012. In this test, the KAPS successfully intercepted RPG-7 and Metis-M rockets approaching 10 to 15 meters in front of the tank in 0.2 to 0.3 seconds.

== Status ==
The KAPS was developed for the K2 Black Panther, but it was not installed on the K2 due to high production costs, concerns about damage to infantry, and problems that Multispectral Screening Smoke Grenade (MSSG) soft-kill and hard-kill active protection systems could not be used at the same time. The K2 tank currently being mass-produced is equipped with only a MSSG soft-kill active protection systems, and in the future, KAPS will be installed in the K2 PIP, an improved variant of the K2.

In October 2023, Hyundai Rotem unveiled a prototype amphibious infantry fighting vehicle called the N-WAV (Next generation Wheeled Armoured Vehicle) equipped with KAPS.
