= Mayak (disambiguation) =

Mayak is a nuclear fuel reprocessing plant.

Mayak (meaning "lighthouse" in Russian) may also refer to:

- Radio Mayak, a Soviet/Russian radio station
- Mayak (film), 2006
- Maiac, an urban settlement in Transnistria
- Mayak Shangina, a peak in Altai Krai
- Mayak (rocket family), a proposed Ukrainian family of carrier rockets
- Mayak (satellite), Russian amateur artificial satellite launched in 2017
- Mayak, Azerbaijan (disambiguation)

== See also ==
- Majak (disambiguation)
- Maiak (disambiguation)
