= Mayak, Azerbaijan =

Mayak, Azerbaijan may refer to:

- Mayak, Beylagan
- Birinci Mayak, Neftchala Rayon
- İkinci Mayak, Neftchala Rayon
