= Maiak =

Maiak may refer to:

- Maiak, Chornomorske Raion, village in Crimea
- Maiak, Donetsk Raion, Donetsk Oblast, urban-type settlement in Makiivka Municipality
- Maiak, Pokrovsk Raion, Donetsk Oblast, rural settlement in Pokrovsk Raion
- FC Maiak Chirsova, football club in Chirsova, Moldova

== See also ==
- Majak (disambiguation)
- Mayak (disambiguation)
- Maiac, Moldovan town
- Maiaky (disambiguation)
- Malyi Maiak, village in Ukraine
