= Trophy (countermeasure) =

Israeli military active protection system for vehicles

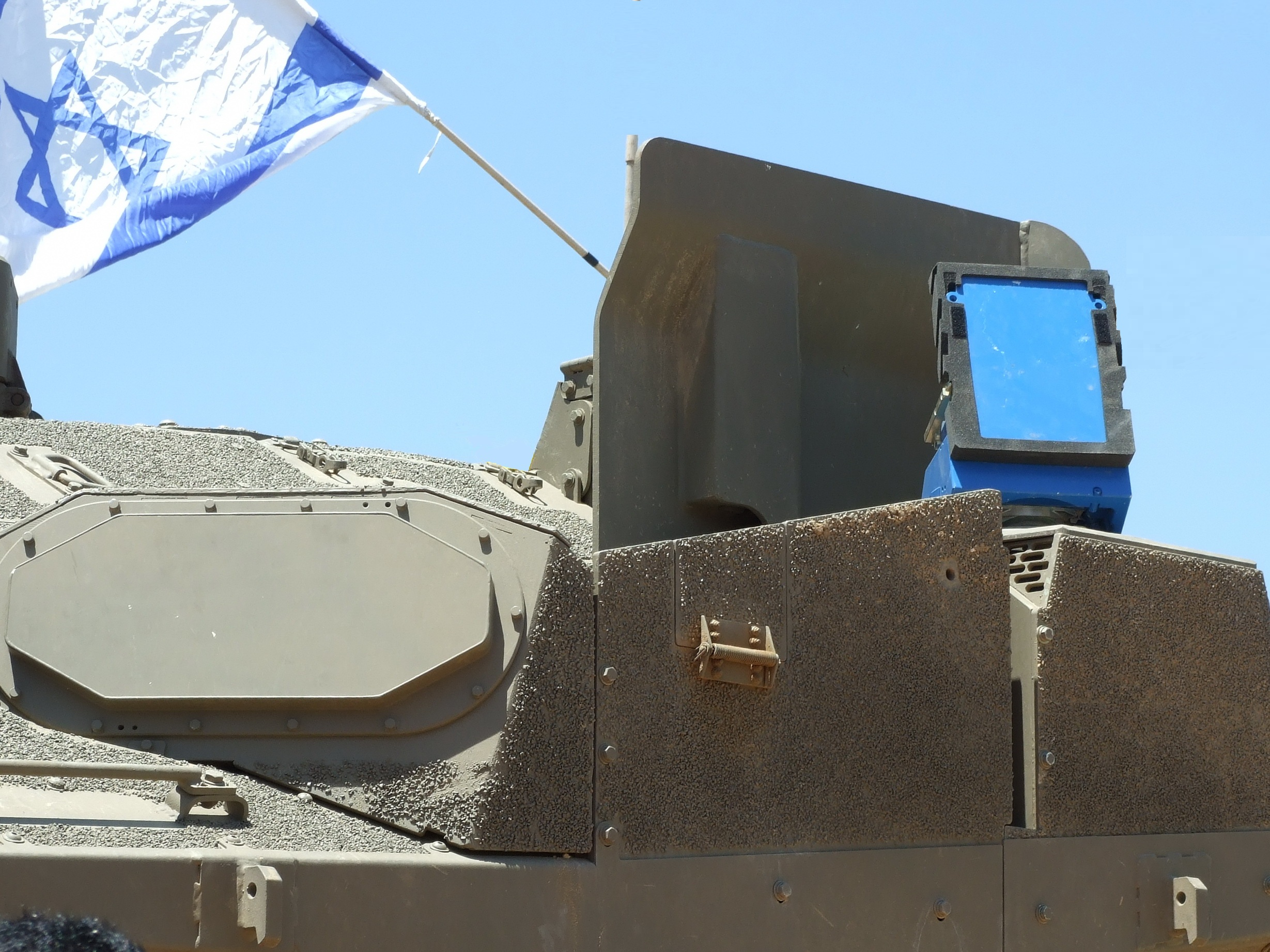
- Trophy EL/M-2133 AESA radar and dummy launcher
- Place of origin: Israel

Service history
- Wars: Gaza–Israel conflict; Operation Protective Edge; Gaza war; 2024 Israeli invasion of Lebanon

Production history
- Designer: Rafael Advanced Defense Systems
- Manufacturer: Rafael Advanced Defense Systems and EuroTrophy GmbH

Specifications
- Mass: 820 kilograms (1,810 lb) (Trophy HV); 480 kilograms (1,060 lb) (Trophy MV/VPS)

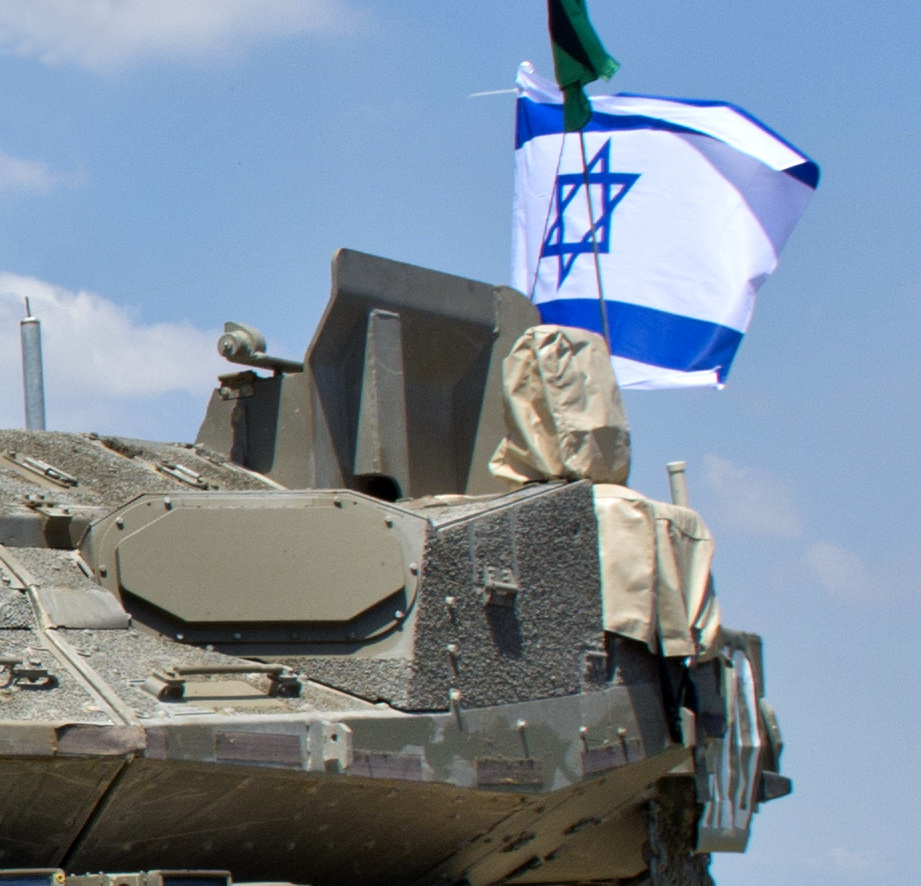
Trophy's radar and covered projectile launcher.

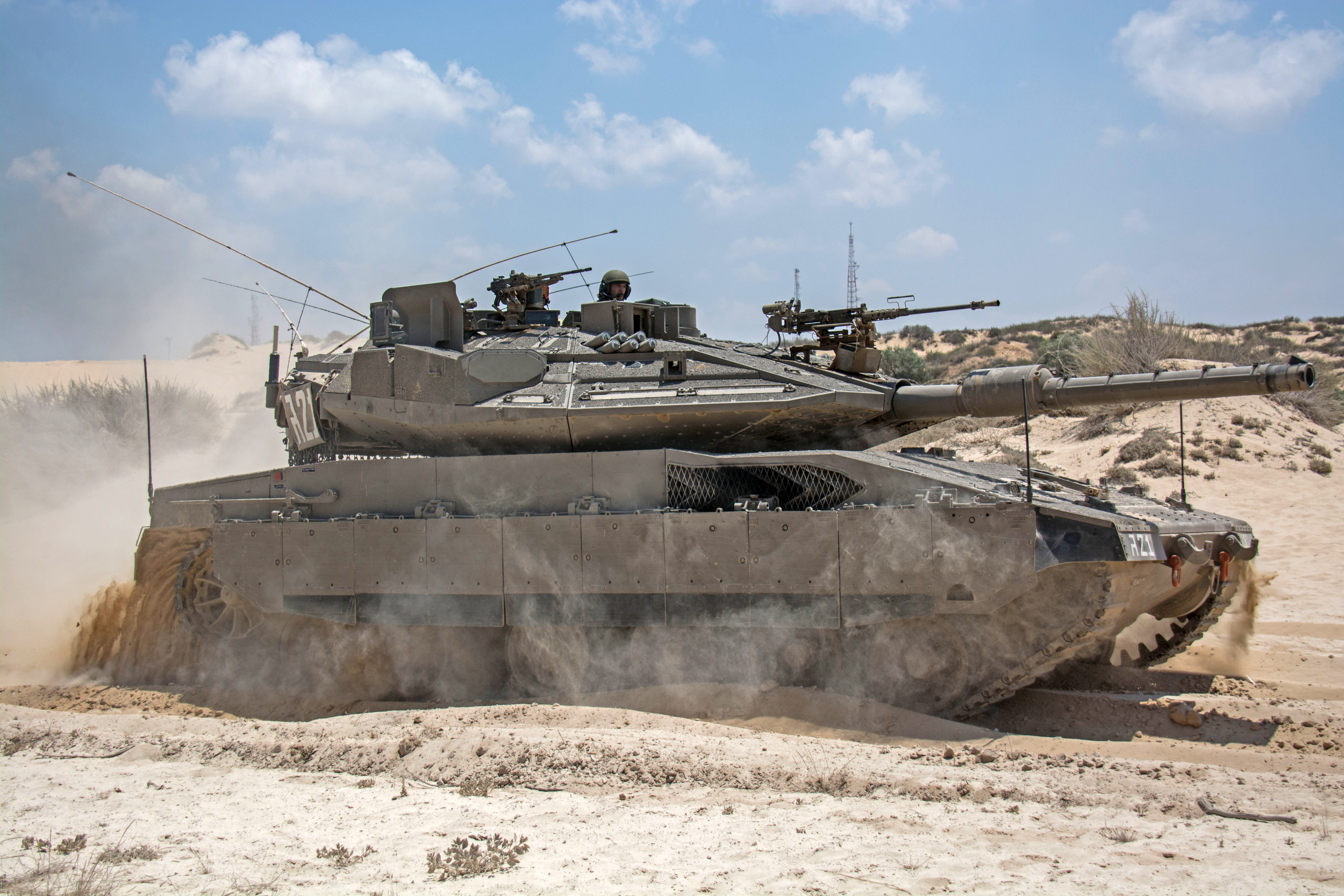
Merkava Mark 4M equipped with Trophy APS technology during Operation Protective Edge.

Trophy (Israel Defense Forces designation מעיל רוח, 'Windbreaker') is an active protection system (APS) for military armored vehicles designed by Rafael Advanced Defense Systems.

It is designed to supplement the standard armor of light and heavy armored fighting vehicles. The system is in active use on Merkava Mark 4 tanks and the Namer armored personnel carrier (APC). It is also found on the Abrams M1A1/M1A2 tanks and has been tested on Stryker APCs and Bradley Fighting Vehicles.

The Trophy system protects against a wide variety of anti-tank threats while enhancing the vehicle's ability to identify enemy locations.

== Design ==
The first production contract for Trophy between the IDF and Rafael was signed in 2007. Israeli Government/IDF safety certification was granted in 2010, and first deliveries began immediately afterward. The design centers on the Elta EL/M-2133 F/G band fire-control radar with four flat-panel antennas mounted on the vehicle; this provides a 360-degree sensing field.

The system relies on high-speed computational technologies. Upon detection of an incoming projectile, the system automatically computes parameters such as the approach vector, nature of the threat, time to impact, and angle of approach. The defensive projectiles are launched by two rotating launchers positioned on the sides of the vehicle. These launchers deploy small explosively formed penetrators (EFPs) in a precise, closely spaced matrix, targeting an area in front of the anti-tank projectile. The system is engineered with a narrow kill zone to ensure the safety of friendly personnel near the vehicle.

Trophy enables connectivity to other technologies, such as soft-kill systems, C4I systems, and remote-controlled weapons stations. The system is designed to defend against many types of anti-tank guided missiles (ATGMs), rockets, high-explosive anti-tank (HEAT) rounds, and shoulder-launched weapons such as rocket-propelled grenades and recoilless rifles.

The system can simultaneously engage numerous threats arriving from different directions; it is effective on stationary or moving platforms against both short- and long-range threats. Newer versions include an automated reloading feature for multiple firings. Rafael's development program includes an enhanced countermeasures unit—to be available in the future—designed to protect against kinetic energy penetrators.

Based on data from 2013, adding the Trophy system to a Merkava Mark 4M potentially adds 30 percent to the cost of each vehicle.

By 2023, 40 Trophy systems and 500 countermeasures were being produced per month.

=== Capabilities and effectiveness ===
As an active protection system, Trophy has proven effective in protecting armored vehicles such as armoured personnel carriers, tanks, and related mechanized armor. By 2024, the manufacturer stated the Trophy system had accumulated 500,000 hours of active operational usage.

Since 2011, Israel has reported that the Trophy system has been operationally successful in low- and high-intensity combat situations, including urban, open, and forested environments. The system has intercepted a variety of threats, including the 9M133 Kornet ATGM and RPG-29. The U.S. Army has reported similar success in tests.

The system utilizes small EFPs projected towards the incoming threat; energy, debris, and explosive pressure waves disintegrate the projectile at a safe distance from the vehicle. In the case of an ATGM, the EFP affects the shaped plasma jet, dramatically decreasing its penetration ability. Trophy is reportedly effective against so-called top attack missiles, which target the thinner upper armor of a vehicle.

Rafael established the first Trophy production line in Israel in 2007, which began delivery in 2010. A second production line was established in the U.S. in 2012, beginning deliveries in 2015, with the main purpose of providing Trophy systems to the IDF as part of the Foreign Military Funding (FMF) program. Both production lines are used for the U.S. contract and others.

=== Use as a target locator ===
The Trophy radar system searches, detects, and classifies incoming projectile risks. It feeds data to the vehicle's onboard computer and to an external network for data sharing with supporting units. This capability notifies both the crew of individual vehicles and the wider combat formation about incoming threats and the exact locations of potential shooters, making the system highly effective for both single vehicles and larger combat groups.

This data sharing and shooter location assists the unit's combat effectiveness, allowing other assets to acquire the hostile target rather than leaving it to a single armored vehicle. Trophy can identify if a threat will miss the targeted platform; in this case, it does not activate the countermeasure but provides shared location data, enabling rapid engagement by the full combat team.

== System limitations ==
Active protection systems add complexity to the equipment they protect, increasing training and maintenance overhead. Components such as multiple sensor arrays are exposed and vulnerable to battle damage.

The system is currently incapable of defeating kinetic energy anti-tank weapons. Current and future systems based on technologies resembling the cancelled MGM-166 LOSAT and the Compact Kinetic Energy Missile (CKEM) designs are able to defeat the Trophy system.

Weight is a concern. The core system, designed for heavier frontline tanks, weighs approximately half a ton. Compared to the weight of a modern main battle tank, which is around 73 tons, this may be acceptable. However, on smaller vehicles, the core system impacts the power-to-weight ratio. There are numerous offerings for lighter armored vehicles which address this concern.

Because the system projects small EFPs toward incoming threats, creating energy, debris, and explosive pressure waves, it poses a risk to dismounted infantry. This impacts traditional infantry-supported mechanized warfare tactics.

The Trophy system has a donut-shaped window of vulnerability to attacks directly from above; additionally, the slow speed of a drone or gravity-dropped grenade might cause it to be filtered out by the Trophy's sensors. In October 2023, Hamas used civilian quadcopter drones to drop shaped-charge grenades and damage several tanks.

According to an informational flyer distributed by Hamas, the system can be defeated by firing an RPG-7 from within 50 metres (160 ft), or using a weapon with a projectile that exceeds the speed of sound, such as the SPG-9 recoilless gun. Firing multiple rounds in quick succession is also a tactic for overwhelming the system. Tharallah is a twin-Kornet system used by the Hezbollah since 2015. It consists of a quadripod equipped with two Kornet tubes to be launched in quick succession. This arrangement is designed to overwhelm the Trophy APS by having a second missile available before the APS can react after the first intercept.

== Trophy MV/VPS ==
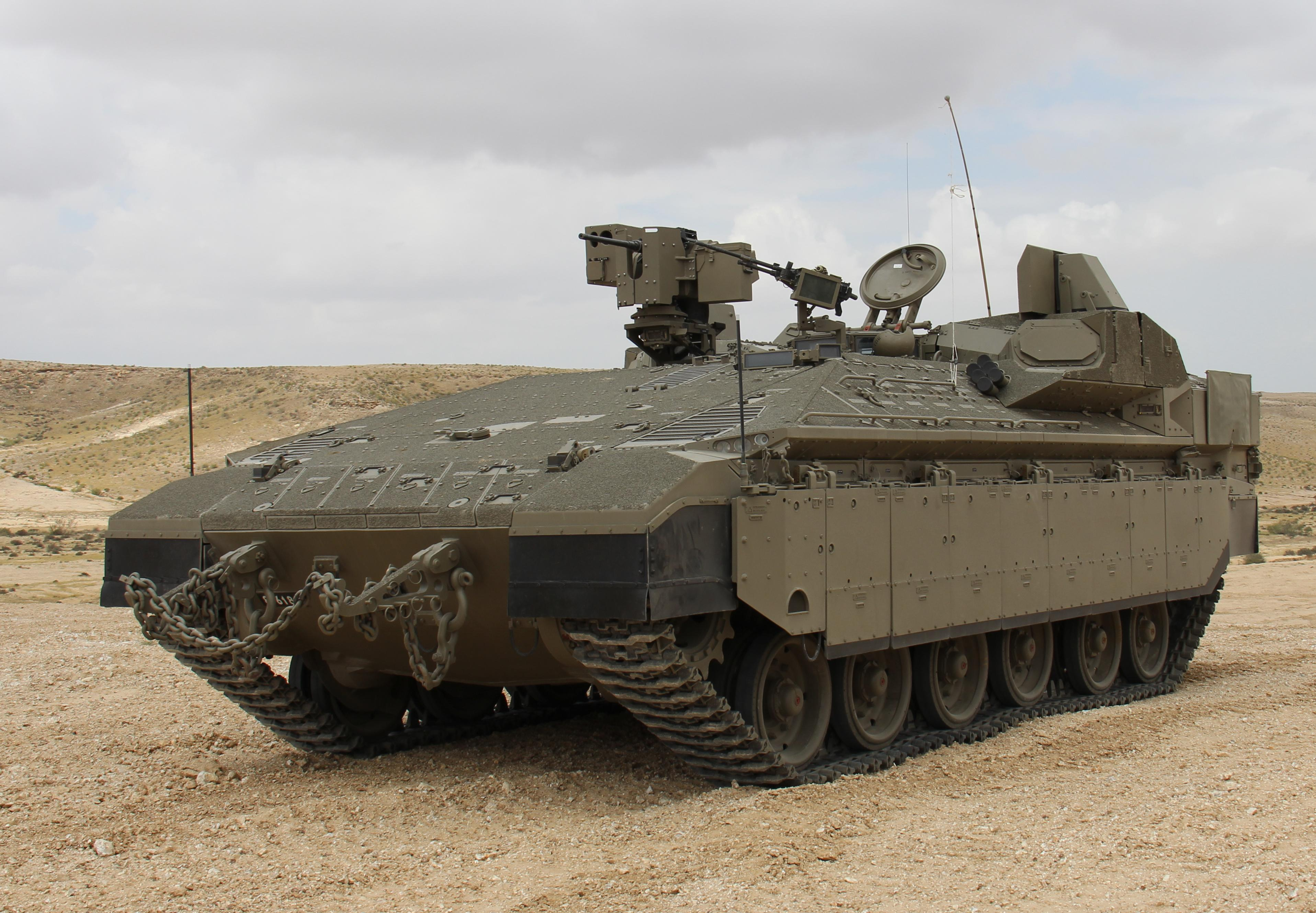
A Namer AFV equipped with Rafael's Trophy system.

Formerly known as "Trophy Light", Trophy MV/VPS was introduced by Rafael Advanced Defence Systems during the British DSEI exhibition in 2007. Unlike the standard Trophy system, which was primarily designed for main battle tanks, the Trophy MV/VPS was specifically engineered for integration with light and medium armored vehicles, such as the Stryker and Bradley. Notably, this system was anticipated to be approximately 40% lighter and smaller than the standard Trophy, intended to offer cost savings without compromising on performance or reliability. This was made possible through the continued utilization of critical components, including the sensor suite, mission computer, and hard-kill mechanism, along with the application of the same combat algorithms as the Trophy HV variant.

Leonardo DRS, Rafael's partner for the Trophy system in the United States, would reportedly be responsible for providing the modified autoloader required for the Trophy MV/VPS.

In the summer of 2018, Rafael conducted an extensive series of qualification tests for the Trophy MV/VPS in Israel, attended by over 130 decision-makers and technical experts from more than 15 countries. These tests were carried out in extreme scenarios, encompassing both rocket and ATGM threats. The reported success rate exceeded 95%. This underlined the system's capability to defend against a variety of threats, solidifying its standing as a solution for light and medium armored vehicles.

=== Trophy LV ===
In June 2014, Rafael unveiled Trophy LV, a lighter variant designed to protect light military vehicles (less than 8 tons) such as jeeps and 4x4s. The system weighs 200 kilograms (440 lb), significantly less than other Trophy applications.

=== Combination with Iron Fist ===
In December 2014, it was reported that Rafael, IAI, and Israel Military Industries (IMI) had agreed to jointly develop a next-generation active defense system for vehicles, based on a combination of the Rafael/IAI Trophy and IMI Iron Fist. Rafael would act as the main contractor, system developer, and integrator, with IAI and IMI as subcontractors. The Israeli Ministry of Defense had pushed the companies to combine their systems. No progress has been reported since then.

== Combat history ==
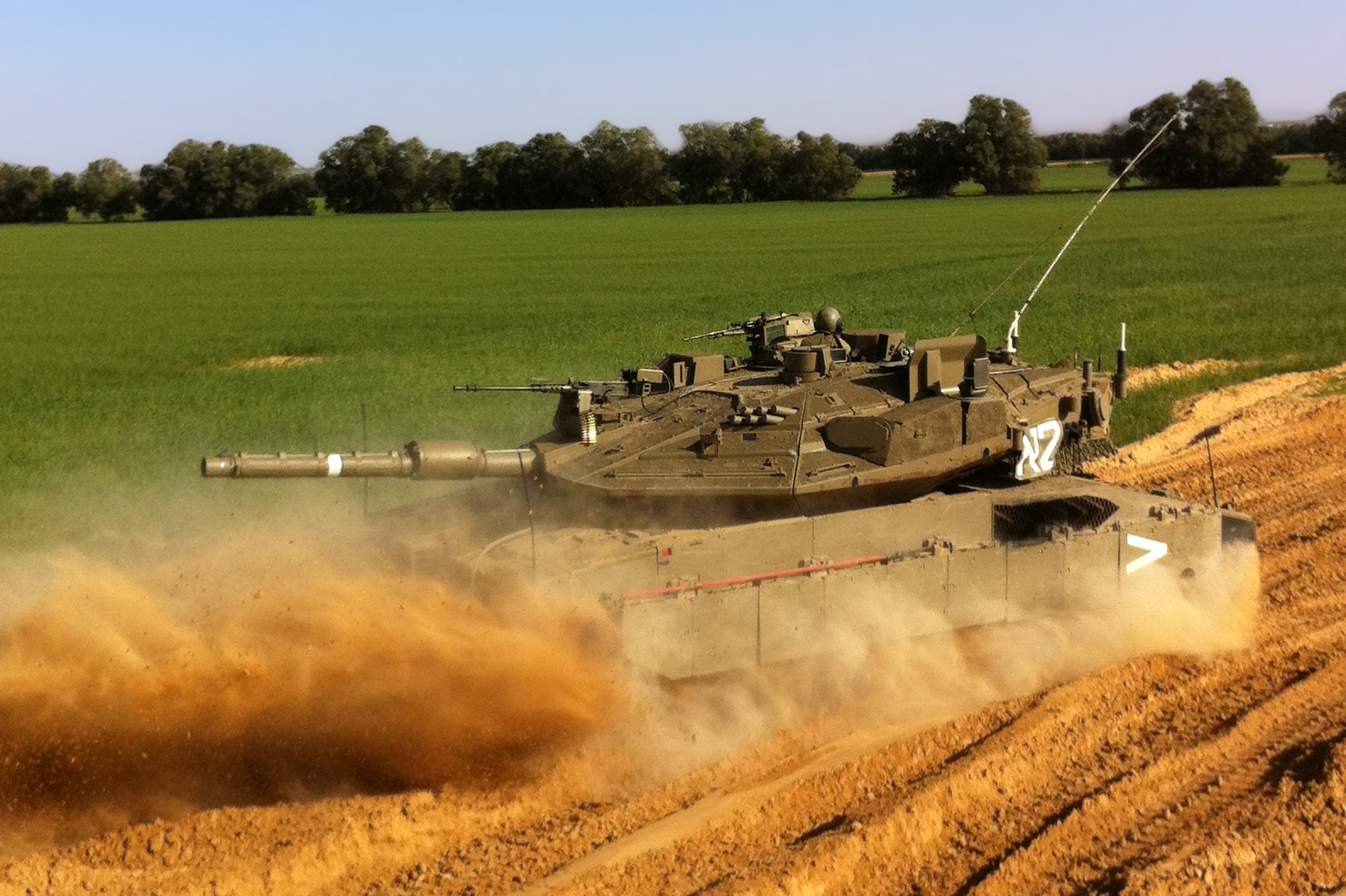
IDF Merkava Mark 4 tank with Trophy APS.

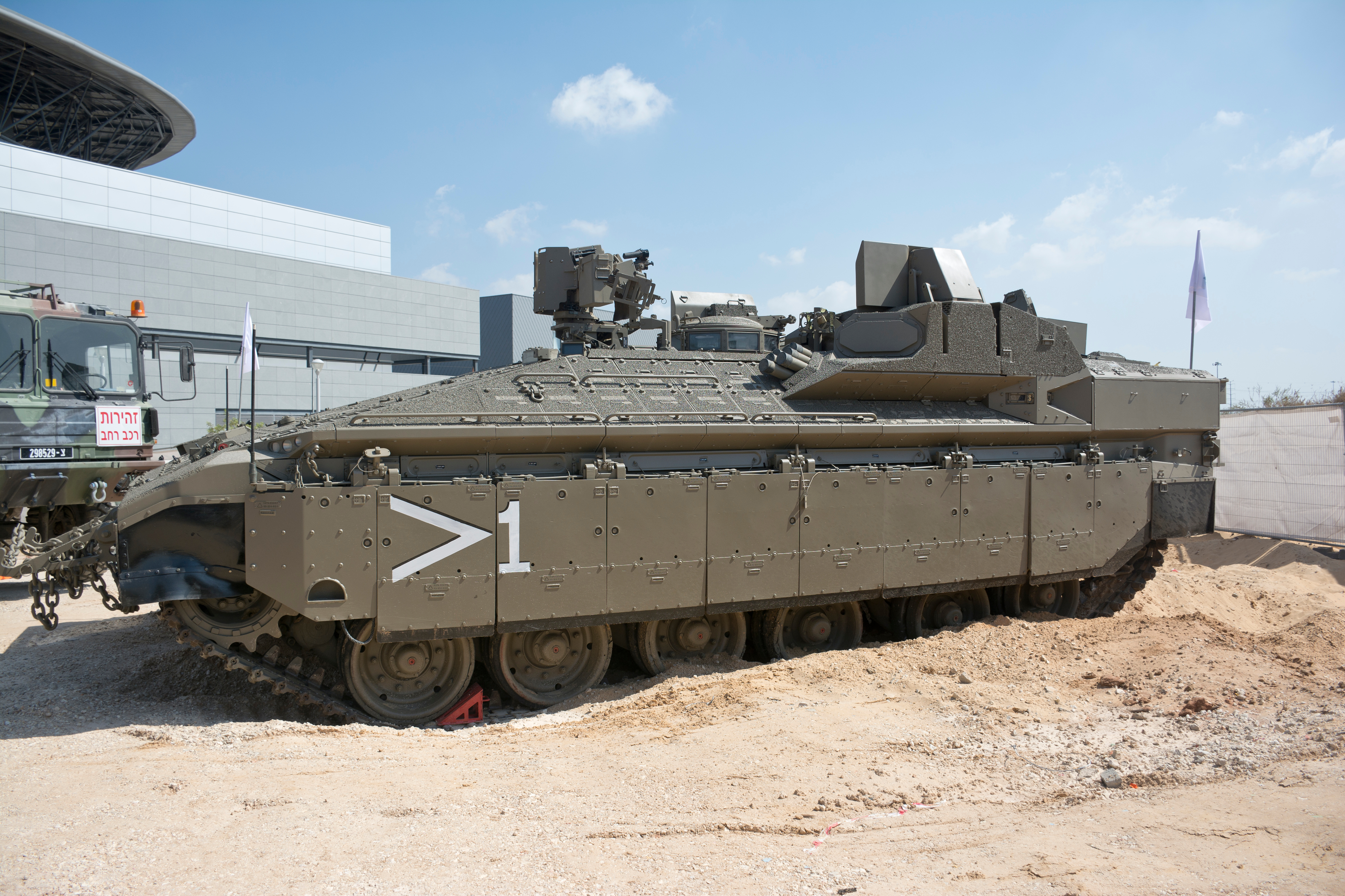
Namer CEV equipped with Trophy APS.

Following a series of tests, the IDF Ground Forces Command declared the Trophy system operational in August 2009. It was scheduled to be installed in a full battalion of Israeli Armored Corps tanks by 2010.

On 1 March 2011, a Merkava Mark 4 equipped with the Trophy system successfully foiled a missile attack aimed toward it near the Gaza border; this marked the first operational success of the Trophy active defense system. On 20 March 2011, a missile was fired at a Merkava Mark 4 equipped with Trophy inside the Israeli area along the perimeter fence of the Gaza Strip. The system detected the attack but determined that it did not endanger the tank and did not intercept it; it passed information about the shooting to the crew, who attacked the source of the fire. On 1 August 2012, Trophy successfully intercepted an anti-tank missile launched from the Gaza Strip at a Merkava tank near the Kissufim junction.

On 14 July 2014, the Trophy system successfully intercepted a 9M133 Kornet anti-tank missile fired from Gaza at an IDF tank. From the beginning of the Israeli Operation Protective Edge to 20 July 2014, at least four Israeli tanks of senior commanders were protected by the Trophy system in the Gaza Strip. According to reports from the front, since the beginning of the ground operation, the system successfully intercepted five anti-tank missiles that were aimed at armored IDF vehicles in Gaza. On 22 July 2014, according to a video by a Palestinian group, the Trophy system installed on a Merkava Mark 4 tank successfully intercepted an RPG-29 rocket fired at the tank.

According to Debkafile, Hamas has tried to stop Israeli tanks with two kinds of advanced guided anti-tank missiles, the Russian Kornet-E and the 9M113 Konkurs, but Trophy intercepted them successfully. The appearance of near-invulnerable mobile land platforms suggests the current warfare paradigm may need revising. As of 2016, Trophy was operational on all Merkava Mark 4 tanks of the IDF's 401st Armored Brigade, and with the 7th Armored Brigade 75th Battalion's new Merkava Mark 4 tanks.

In July 2016, the Israeli Ministry of Defense (MOD) announced it had completed integrating Trophy on its first brigade company of Namer APCs. In November 2016, it was announced that the IDF would buy hundreds more Trophy systems to install on almost all of its Merkava Mark 4 MBTs and Namer APC/IFVs.

=== Operation Protective Edge ===
Israel stated that no tanks were damaged during Operation Protective Edge, with the Trophy system performing over a dozen interceptions of anti-tank weapons including Kornet, Metis, and RPG-29. The system, by identifying the source of fire, on occasion also allowed tanks to kill the Hamas anti-tank team.

Giora Katz, head of Rafael's land division, stated it was a "breakthrough because it is the first time in military history where an active defense system has proven itself in intense fighting." During the war, Trophy validated itself in dozens of events, protecting tanks and crews over three weeks of high-threat maneuvering operations in built-up areas without a single hit to defended platforms and zero false alarms.

== International operators ==
=== Current operators ===
Germany (17)
In February 2021, the Israeli Ministry of Defense and the German Federal Ministry of Defense signed a government-to-government agreement to supply the Trophy system to the German military for the order of 17 modernised Leopard 2A7A1s. Germany's Federal Office of Bundeswehr Equipment, Information Technology and In-Service Support agreement with the Israeli Ministry of Defense covers the supply of systems for a tank company, interceptors, spare parts, and operational and technical training.
On 2 November 2021, the Israeli Ministry of Defense and the German Federal Ministry of Defense announced the successful completion of trials of the Trophy system on Germany's Leopard 2 tanks, conducted the prior week. The trials included various scenarios to challenge the system, with over 90% of attacks on the tanks intercepted, according to the Israeli Defense Ministry, while the location of the source of fire was also accurately detected. The trials marked the completion of the installation of Trophy systems onto the German tanks.
The first delivery of a completed tank took place in October 2024. The chassis are newly manufactured, and the turrets come from Leopard 2A6A3 variants. Eurotrophy was awarded a contract for 123 newly manufactured Leopard 2A8s in December 2024.
United States
Trophy has been evaluated with extensive testing on a Stryker vehicle for possible adoption by the US Army, and a Canadian LAV III. The Army tested the Trophy system in 2017, to be fielded within two years as an interim system until the Modular Active Protection System (MAPS) program produces a system. A 193 million dollar contract for Trophy was awarded to Leonardo DRS, Rafael's American partner, in June 2018, to equip a significant number of M1 Abrams M1A1/A2 MBTs with Trophy. In January 2021, Rafael and Leonardo DRS completed urgent deliveries of enough Trophies to the Army to equip all tanks of four armored brigades, some 400 systems.

=== Future operators ===
Norway (54)
Norway's 54 Leopard 2A8 tanks will be equipped with the EuroTrophy system. The contract was approved in September 2023.
United Kingdom
On 24 June 2021, the UK Ministry of Defence and Rafael announced that Trophy had been selected for detailed assessment and potential integration into the British Army's Challenger 3 main battle tank. Rafael stated in a press release that the selection was the result of a study conducted by the ministry as part of the Challenger upgrade program led by prime contractor Rheinmetall BAE Systems Land, involving detailed integration and system trials of the lighter Trophy MV variant.
In September 2023, a contract was signed to integrate the system on the Challenger 3 tank. The contract covers the integration and trial of a small number of systems prior to full integration.

=== Potential operators ===
Croatia (50)
In October 2024, Croatian Defense Minister Ivan Anušić signed a letter of intent with German Defense Minister Boris Pistorius for the purchase of up to 50 Leopard 2A8 tanks.
Czech Republic (70 to 77)
The Czech Ministry of Defence started negotiations for the purchase of 70–77 Leopard 2A8 tanks in May 2023, including domestic manufacturing rights for aspects of the tank production. The Czech government approved the purchase in June 2024, with the final order being for 77 tanks delivered by 2030, for an estimated 52 billion Czech koruna.
Latvia
Latvia has selected the ASCOD 2 as its future infantry fighting vehicle (IFV). Variants of this IFV are equipped with the Trophy APS.
Lithuania
In July 2023, the Lithuanian Ministry of National Defence announced that the Leopard 2A8 proved to be the only tank to meet the requirements set by the ministry, leading to the rejection of bids for the M1 Abrams and K2 Black Panther tanks. In January 2024, the Lithuanian State Defence Council agreed to purchase the tanks and associated support vehicles to equip a tank battalion, though the final cost and number of vehicles remained a subject of negotiations. The base variant of the Leopard 2A8 is equipped with the Trophy APS, making Lithuania a potential operator.
Netherlands
In August 2023, the Dutch Ministry of Defence began planning the procurement of up to 52 Leopard 2A8 tanks in addition to their eighteen leased Leopard 2A6 tanks. This planned acquisition was part of the nation's effort to rebuild its army after budget cuts. In February 2024, the Dutch budget for 2024 did not initially allocate funding for the purchase. In early September 2024, the new government announced that an undefined number of Leopard 2A8 tanks would be ordered; this was possible because the government allocated additional funding exceeding 2% of GDP. In May 2025, this number was modified to at least 46 tanks, with an option for 6 more, for a maximum of 52 Leopard 2A8s.
India
On 15 February 2025, during Aero India 2025, Larsen & Toubro signed a memorandum of understanding (MoU) with Rafael Advanced Defense Systems to manufacture the Trophy APS in India and offer the system's integration onto armoured platforms of the Indian Army.

== See also ==
- Drozd – The first attempt at making an active protection system by the Soviet Union.
  - Arena – An updated and more effective version of Drozd, closer to the Israeli Iron Fist APS.
- Zaslin – Ukrainian APS for use on BM Oplot tanks.
- Iron Fist – Another Israeli active protection system developed by Israel Military Industries.
- GL5 Active Protection System – A Chinese hard-kill active protection system.
- Afganit – A Russian hard-kill active protection system for use on the T-14 Armata, T-15 Armata, and Kurganets-25.
