= Myriad CIWS =

Naval anti-aircraft gun

Myriad CIWS was a twin 7 barrelled, 25 mm rotary cannon-style CIWS developed by a consortium including OTO Melara. The system's primary purpose, had it ever gone into production, would have been defense against anti-ship missiles, and other precision guided weapons.

== Specifications ==
- Gun: 25 mm/80 (1 in) Oerlikon KBD Gatling gun.
- Weight: 17,000 lb (7,700 kg) total.
- Traverse: 360 degrees.
- Muzzle velocity: HE-I: 3,182 ft/s (970 m/s), APDS-T: 3,525 ft/s (1070 m/s), AMPDS: 3,484 ft/s (1060 m/s), FAPDS: 3,525 ft/s (1070 m/s).
- Rate of fire: 83 round/second (5000 round/minute) per gun, combined rate of fire, 10,000 round/minute.
- Ammunition: Fixed (HE-I, APDS-T, AMPDS, FAPDS) 2,000 rounds in magazine, per gun.
- Weapons range: Effective range with AMDS (160 g) shell, 1,100 yards (1,000 m)

== See also ==
- Goalkeeper CIWS
