= Shtora-1 =

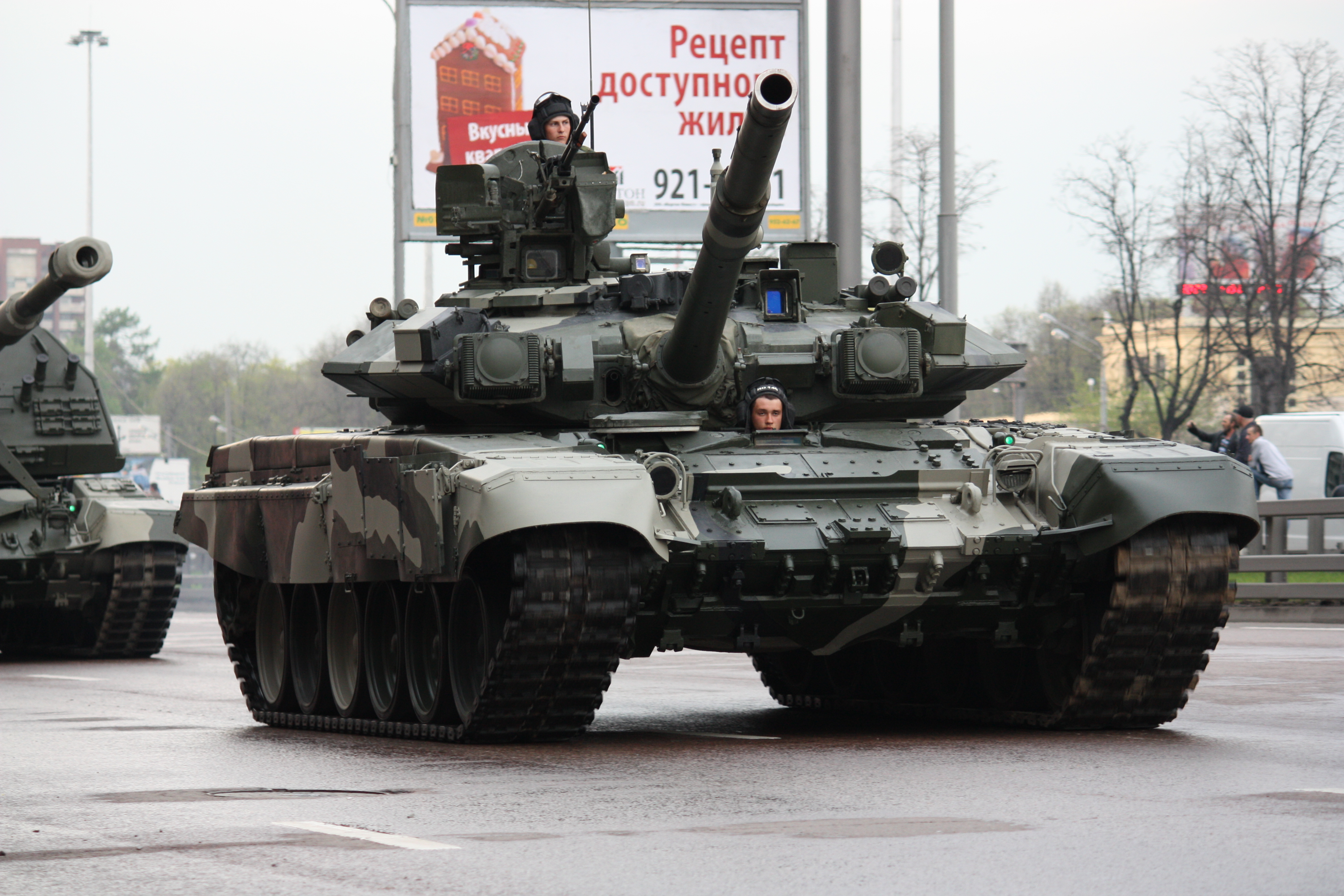
- A T-90 main battle tank fitted with the Shtora system; note the two dazzler "boxes" to each side of the main gun
- Type: Active protection system
- Place of origin: Soviet Union

Service history
- In service: 1988–present

Production history
- Designer: NII Transmash in St.Petersburg in cooperation with Elers-Elektron in Moscow
- Designed: 1980

Specifications
- Mass: 350 kg (770 lb)

Shtora-1 (Russian: Штора, "curtain") is an electro-optical active protection system or suite for tanks, designed to disrupt the laser designator and laser rangefinders of incoming anti-tank guided missiles (ATGMs). The system is mounted on the Russian T-80 and T-90 series tanks and the Ukrainian T-84. The existence of Shtora was revealed in 1980 by spy Adolf Tolkachev.

== Description ==
Shtora-1 is an electro-optical jammer that disrupts semiautomatic command to line of sight (SACLOS) ATGMs, laser rangefinders and target designators. Shtora-1 is a soft kill countermeasure system. The system was shown fitted to a Russian main battle tank during the International Defense Exposition, held in Abu Dhabi in 1995. The first known application of the system is the Russian T-90 main battle tank, which entered service in the Russian Army in 1993. (Note: Though an early version of the system was apparently fitted to the pre-production T-80 model.) It is also available on the BMP-3M infantry fighting vehicle.

== Components ==
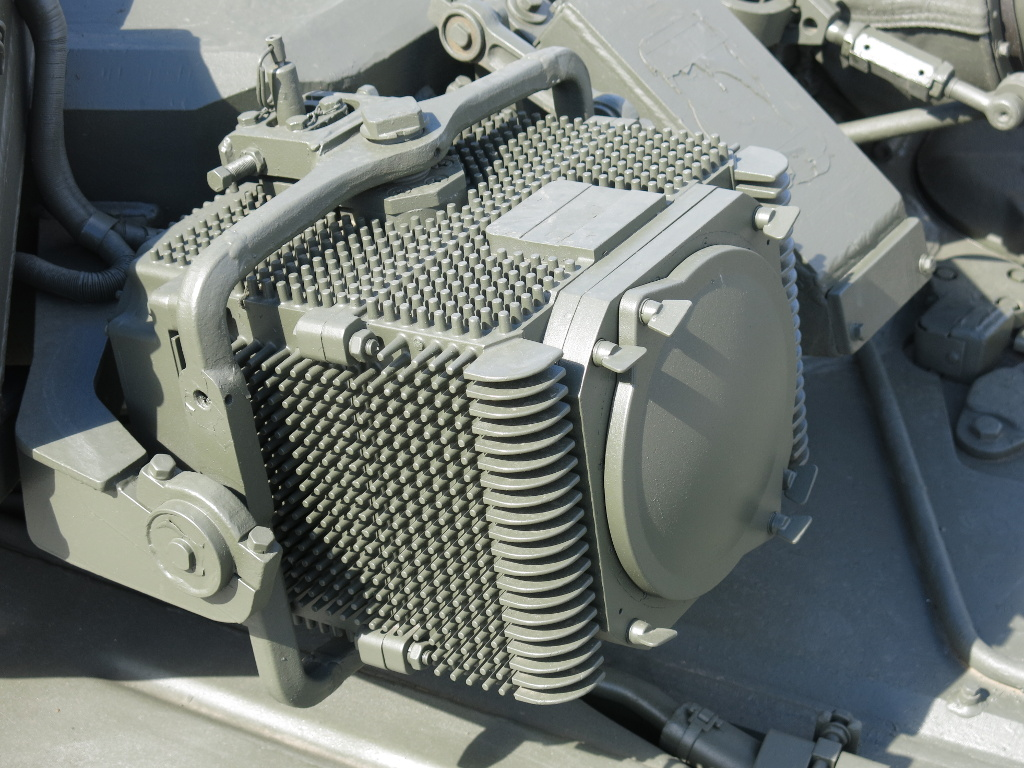
Infrared light emitter, with its opening protected by a round cover

The Shtora-1 has four key components: two electro-optical/infrared (EO/IR) "dazzlers" mounted on both turret cheeks, an infrared jammer, a modulator, and a control panel in the fighting compartment.

- Banks of forward firing grenade launchers on each side of the turret that lay an aerosol smoke screen opaque to IR light.
- A laser warning system consisting of four angle sensors with two higher precision sensors covering the frontal 90° arc and two lower precision sensors covering the sides and rear.
- A control system comprising control panel, microprocessor, and manual screen-laying panel. This processes the information from the sensors and activates the aerosol screen-laying system.
- Two IR lights, one on each side of the main gun, continuously emit coded pulsed-IR jamming when an incoming ATGM has been detected.

Shtora-1 has twelve smoke grenade launchers and weighs 400 kg. It can lay a 15 meter high and 20 meter wide smoke screen in three seconds that lasts about twenty seconds at ranges from 50 to 70 meters. The Shtora-1 can also automatically slew the main gun towards a detected threat, so that the tank crew can return fire and so that the stronger frontal turret armour is facing it.

Shtora-1 can operate in fully automatic or semi-automatic modes, protecting the vehicle continuously for up to six hours against ATGM attacks.

== Operational history ==
A number of Shtora-1 protected T-90s have been lost to anti-tank guided weapons in Syria and Ukraine. The jammers have been removed from many currently serving T-90s with the more modern T-90S and T-90M variants not usually including them, instead they use the Arena-M Hard Kill system or no system at all with the Shtora being a rare sight to see.

== Specifications ==
- Laser illumination sensors:
  - 2x TShU-1-1 coarse precision sensors and 2x TShU-1-11 fine sensors
  - Field of view (each): 138° azimuth (coarse) 45° (fine) and −5 to +25° elevation
  - Field of view (total): 360° azimuth
  - Angular resolution: 7.5° (coarse) 3.75° (fine)
- EO interference emitters:
  - 2x OTShU-1-7
  - Operating band: 0.7-2.7 μm
  - Protected sector: 4° elevation and 20° azimuth
  - Energy consumption: 1 kW
  - Light intensity: 20 mcd
- IR smoke grenades:
  - 12x 81 mm 3D17
  - Obscured band: 0.4-14 μm
  - Bloom time: 3 s
  - Cloud persistence: 20 s
