= Maiaky =

Maiaky or Mayaky (Ukrainian: Маяки) may refer to several villages in Ukraine:

- Maiaky, Donetsk Oblast
- Maiaky, Odesa Raion, Odesa Oblast
- Maiaky, Podilsk Raion, Odesa Oblast
- Maiaky, Rivne Oblast
- Maiaky, Vinnytsia Oblast

== See also ==
- Maiak (disambiguation)
