= Zaslin Active Protection System =

Zaslin
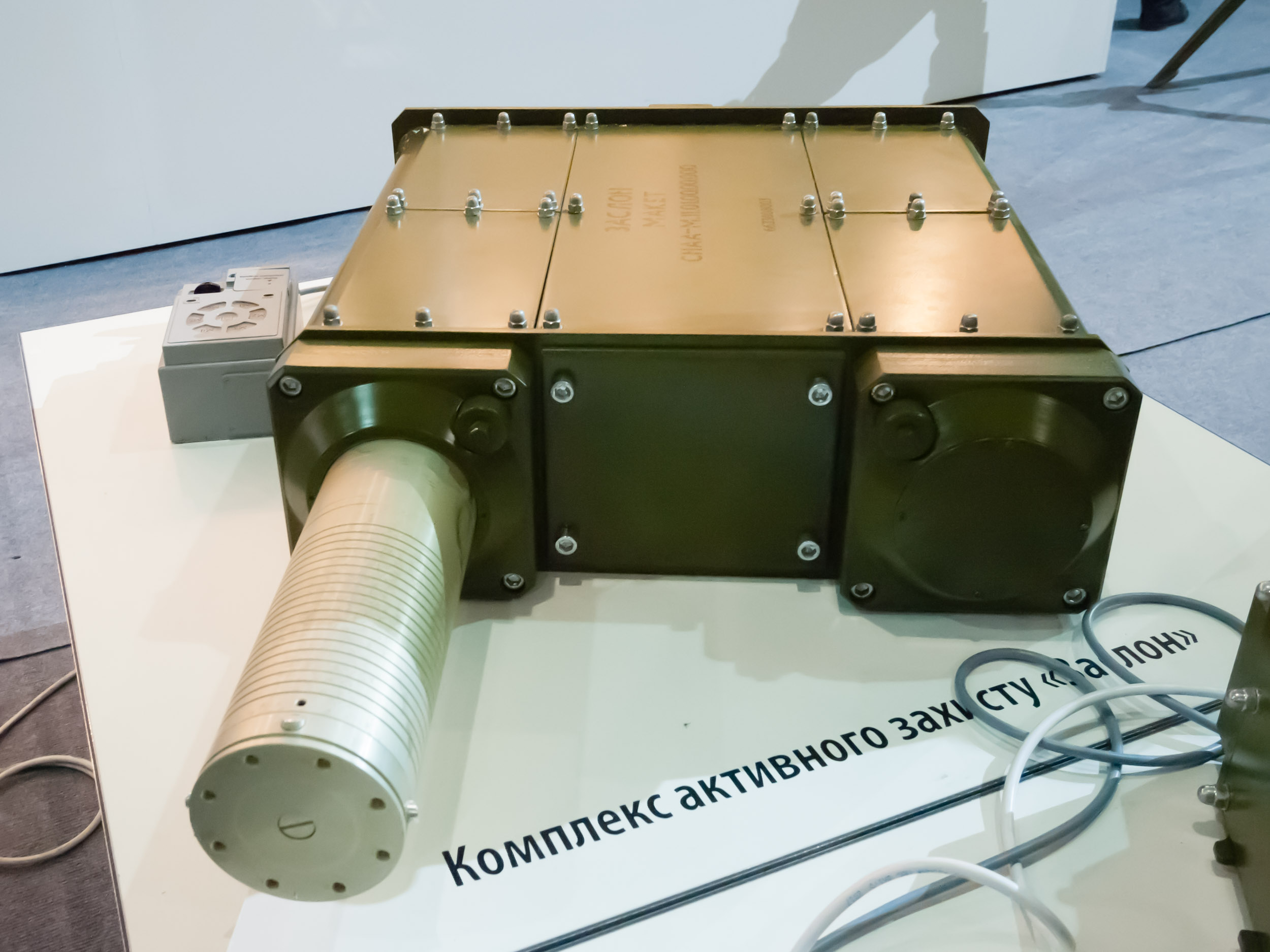
- Type: Active protection system
- Place of origin: Ukraine

Service history
- Used by: Turkey

Production history
- Designer: State Enterprise Fundamental center of crucial technologies Microtek – SE FCCT M
- Designed: 2003

Specifications
- Mass: 50–130 kg per module

The Zaslin active protection system (Ukrainian: Заслі́н, romanized: Zaslin, lit. 'barrier, screen, covering operation'; is often referred to with the Russian word Zaslon) is being developed by Microtek in cooperation with other military design organizations. The system is designed to protect stationary or mobile targets from anti-tank weapons with flat or diving trajectories using various types of guidance systems and warheads. Unlike the existing Russian-designed active protection systems Drozd and Arena, Zaslin can be deployed alongside reactive armour placed in the turret area, which is vulnerable to anti-tank projectiles traveling at speeds up to 1,200 metres per second (3,900 ft/s).

== Design ==
The Zaslin system consists of a radar-based detection module, a guidance module and static counter-measure modules. Each counter-measure module packs two explosive charges, which are ejected toward the target before detonating and forming a dense fragmentation ring that destroys incoming projectiles on impact. Modules can point forward, sideways or vertically, to protect from attacks from above. The system's response time is 0.1 seconds.

A typical installation protects 150–180 degrees, and is capable of defeating incoming projectiles at speeds between 70 and 1,200 m/s. It can be used to protect fixed sites or armored vehicles. Depending on the protection level required, the system adds from 50 to 130 kilograms (110 to 290 lb) per module.

== Lightweight version ==
Microtek also developed an Active Protection (AP) system for lightweight armored fighting vehicles. The AP's mission capability has been proven for armor-piercing projectiles and small-caliber gun shells. The Light AP Zaslin will comprise a system of nonrecoverable, detachable modules of various kinds, with two accommodated on the vehicle's upper forebody and as many on its sides (in its integrated configuration). As pointed out by the system designer, the Zaslin lightweight AP system is effective against RPG-7 and RPG-29 rounds, as well as anti-tank guided missiles. However, it will not shield against hollow-charge artillery shells or armor-piercing sub-caliber shells which have thicker walls than grenades or TRG projectiles.

== Variants ==
- Zaslin – basic version
- Zaslin-L – lighter version
- Akkor-Pulat – Turkish active protection system based on the Zaslin-L. The difference from Zaslin-L is that it is designed as a modular disposable unit that is lighter and easier to integrate.
