= Afganit =

Russian active protection system

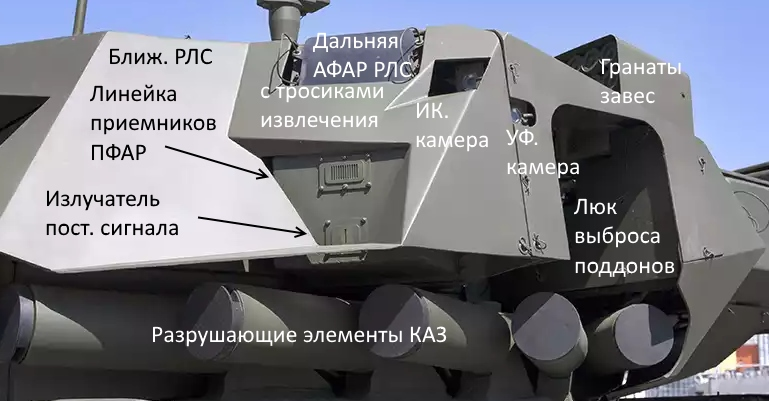
Estimated location of Afghanit components, labelled in Russian

Afganit (Russian: Афганит, lit. 'Afghanite') is a Russian active protection system (APS) employed on modern Russian Armata family of vehicles. It is intended to supersede the Arena APS and utilises radar and electro-optical sensors in the ultraviolet and infrared bands. The millimeter-wavelength radar detects and tracks incoming anti-tank munitions. The system can reportedly intercept armour-piercing fin-stabilized discarding sabot kinetic energy penetrators in addition to high-explosive anti-tank (HEAT) munitions. Currently, the maximum speed that can be intercepted is 1,700 m/s (Mach 5.0), with projected future increases of up to 3,000 m/s (Mach 8.8). According to news sources, it protects the tank from all sides.
