= LEDS-150 =

Active protection system

LEDS-150 Land Electronic Defence System is an active protection system, developed by Saab Avitronics, a South African subsidiary of the Swedish aerospace and defence company, Saab.

The system is able to counter most known threats against armored vehicles with soft and hard kill methods.

LEDS-150 consists of laser warning sensors, an ADC-150 Active Defence Controller, a number of MCTS Munition Confirmation and Tracking Sensors, and High-Speed Directed Launchers, HSDL, which allows the combination of soft- and hard-kill countermeasure deployment capability to the platform, optional displays, and interconnecting harnesses.

This system uses the Denel Dynamics Mongoose-1 missile to destroy the incoming threat in 5 to 15 meters distance from the protected vehicle. LEDS-150 covers all 360 degrees azimuth; its elevation coverage is from -15 to +65 degrees.

The system has been integrated on the MOWAG Piranha armoured personnel carrier.

The South African Army has funded much of the development of this system.
