= GL5 Active Protection System =

Chinese-made active protection system

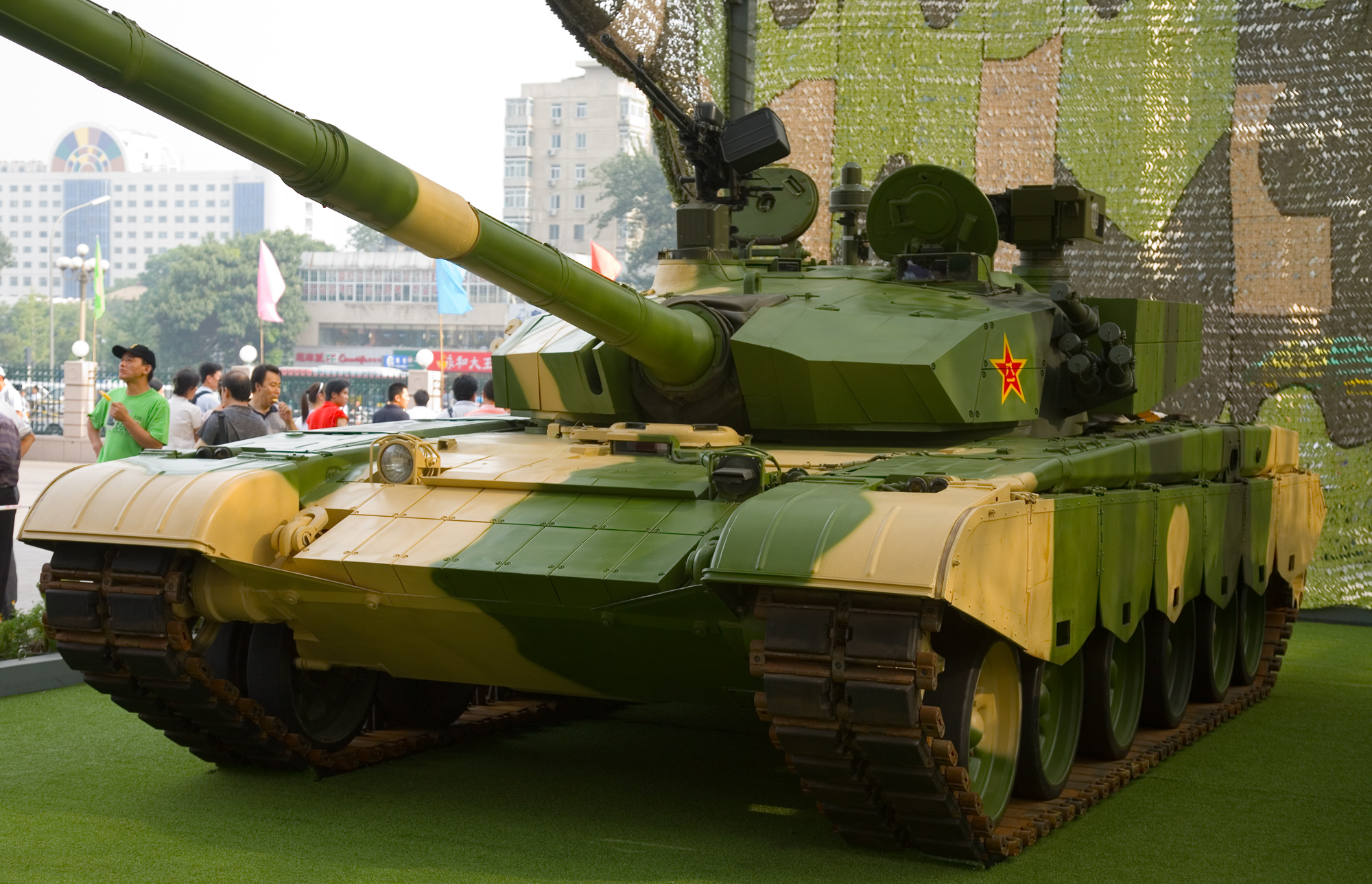
Type 99 - 3rd generation main battle tank

The GL5 Active Protection System is an active protection system developed in China by NORINCO designed for main battle tanks and infantry fighting vehicles. The system can detect incoming warheads such as anti-tank guided missiles (ATGM) with a range of 100m and within a 360-degree horizontal and 20-degree band. Upon detection, two defensive rockets are fired at the incoming threat. The system employs four multi-mission fire control radars for tracking and engaging incoming threats. It is to be installed on VT-4 main battle tanks and VT-5 light tanks.
