= İkinci Mayak =

- Municipality
- Location within Azerbaijan
- Coordinates: 39°21′56″N 49°19′45″E
- Country: Azerbaijan
- Rayon: Neftchala

Population
  - Total: 361
- Time zone: UTC+4 (AZT)
  - Summer (DST): UTC+5 (AZT)

İkinci Mayak (also, İkinci Nömräli Mayak and Vtoroy Mayak) is a village and the least populous municipality in the Neftchala Rayon of Azerbaijan. It has a population of 361.
