= Mayak, Beylagan =

Mayak
- Municipality
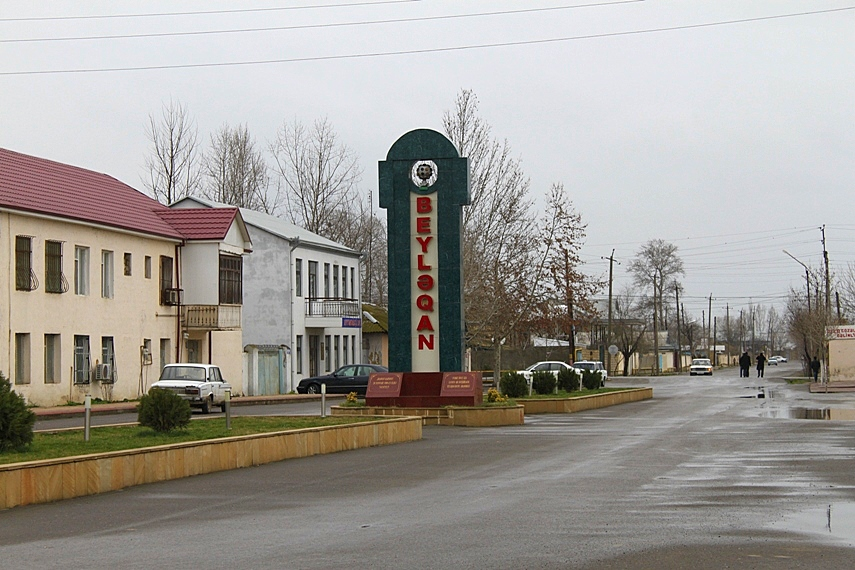

- Location within Azerbaijan
- Coordinates: 39°45′44″N 47°40′50″E
- Country: Azerbaijan
- Rayon: Beylagan

Population
  - Total: 726
- Time zone: UTC+4 (AZT)
  - Summer (DST): UTC+5 (AZT)

Mayak is a village and municipality in the Beylagan Rayon of Azerbaijan. 726 nafar aholi istiqomat qiladi.
