= Mij, Fars =

Mij ميج
- Village
- Location within Iran
- Coordinates: 29°51′12″N 53°08′58″E
- Country: Iran
- Province: Fars
- County: Marvdasht
- Bakhsh: Seyyedan
- Rural District: Rahmat

Population (2006)
  - Total: 802
- Time zone: UTC+3:30 (IRST)
  - Summer (DST): UTC+4:30 (IRDT)

Mij (Persian: ميج, also Romanized as Mīj and Meyj; also known as Mājak) is a village in Rahmat Rural District, Seyyedan District, Marvdasht County, Fars province, Iran. At the 2006 census, its population was 802, in 185 families.
