= Simon Mijok Majak =

South Sudanese politician

Simon Mijok Majak is a South Sudanese politician and the Minister of Roads and Bridges as of 2022.

== Work ==
During his reign as minister there are a couple of achievements and challenges that he faced - The 3.6-kilometre-long Freedom Bridge, and a challenge of the $700 million 400 kilometres Juba – Wau highway which was washed away by rains.
