= Maiak, Pokrovsk Raion, Donetsk Oblast =

Rural settlement in Donetsk Oblast, Ukraine

Maiak Маяк
- Rural settlement
- Location of Maiak within Donetsk Oblast#Location of Maiak within Ukraine Maiak (Ukraine)
- Coordinates: 48°25′26″N 37°18′42″E
- Country: Ukraine
- Oblast: Donetsk Oblast
- Raion: Pokrovsk Raion

Population (2022)
  - Total: 1,174
- Time zone: UTC+2 (EET)
  - Summer (DST): UTC+3 (EEST)
- Postal code: 85051
- Area code: +380 6277

Maiak (Ukrainian: Маяк) is a rural settlement located in Pokrovsk Raion, Donetsk Oblast, in eastern Ukraine.

== History ==
Until 18 July 2020, Maiak was part of Dobropillia Raion. However, the raion was abolished as part of Ukraine's administrative reform, which reduced the number of raions in Donetsk Oblast to eight, of which only five remain under government control. The territory of Dobropillia Raion was merged into Pokrovsk Raion.

== Demographics ==
According to the 1989 Soviet census, the population of Maiak was 258, with 142 men and 116 women.

According to the 2001 Ukrainian census, 274 people lived in the rural settlement.

In 2022, its population was estimated at 1,174.

=== Languages ===
According to the 2001 census, the primary languages of the inhabitants of Maiak were:

Language	Percentage
Ukrainian	83.21 %
Russian	13.50 %
Armenian	1.46 %
Moldovan (Romanian)	1.09 %
Belarusian	0.36 %
Others	0.38 %
