= Iron Fist (countermeasure) =

Israeli active protection system for armored fighting vehicles

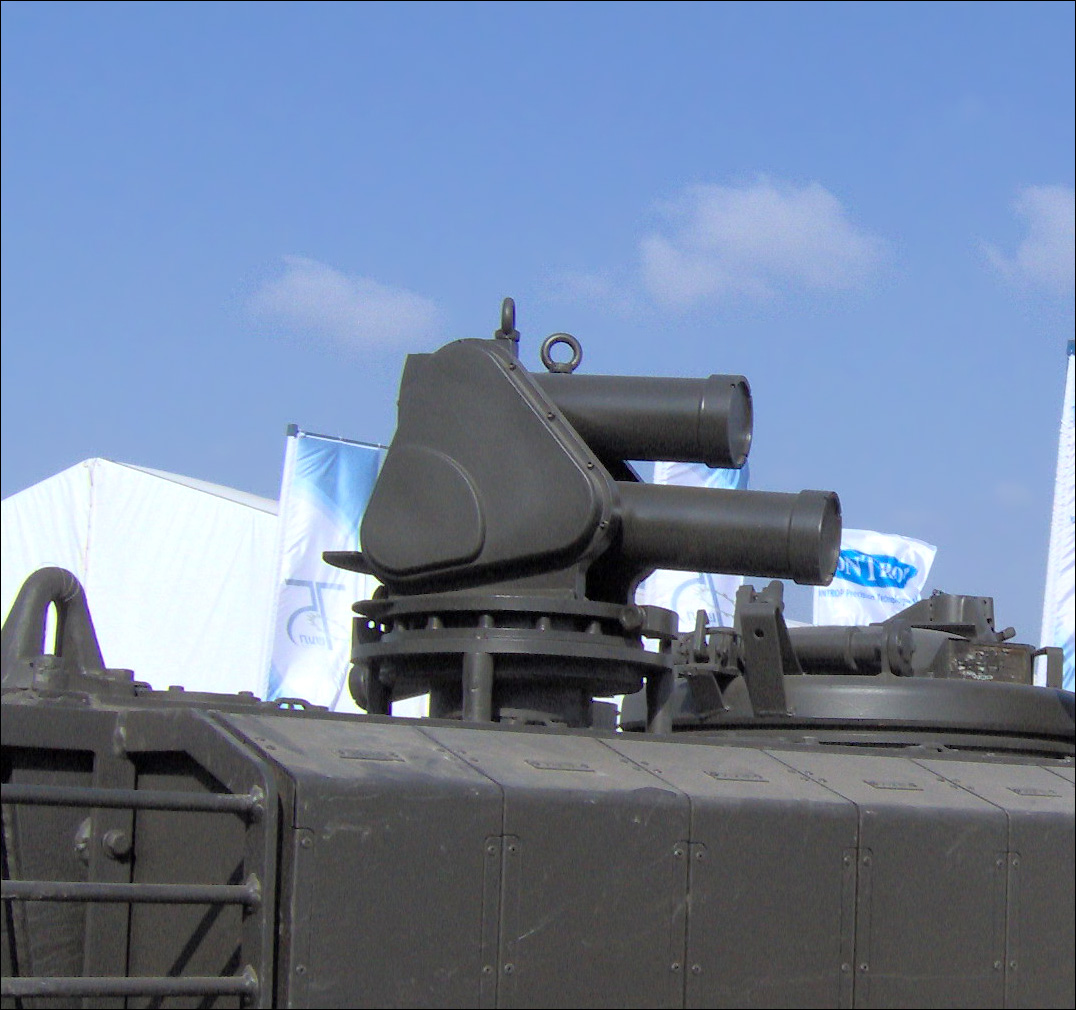
Iron Fist APS

Iron Fist (Hebrew: חץ דורבן, Hetz Dorban, lit. "Porcupine Arrow") is a hard kill active protection system (APS) designed by Israel Military Industries (IMI), with a modular design allowing adaptation to a range of platforms ranging from light utility vehicles to heavy armoured fighting vehicles. The concept was revealed by IMI in 2006 and was expected to enter Israel Defense Forces tests by mid-2007. The system has been successfully tested against a wide variety of threats including rocket-propelled grenades, anti-tank guided missiles and tank-fired high-explosive anti-tank (HEAT) ammunition and kinetic energy penetrators.

It senses incoming threats via a fixed active electronically scanned array radar sensor developed by RADA Electronic Industries and an optional passive infrared detector developed by Elbit's Elisra. When a threat is imminent, an explosive projectile interceptor is launched towards it. The interceptor explodes very near the threat, destroying or deflecting and destabilizing it by detonating its warhead. For this, only the blast effect of the explosive is used. The interceptor casing is made of combustible materials so minimal fragmentation is formed in the explosion, helping minimize collateral damage.

== History ==
Acquisition of the Iron Fist active protection system was approved in June 2009. The system was to be installed on several units of the Namer armoured personnel carrier.

In November 2010, the Israeli ministry of defense announced the end of funding of the system development.

In May 2011, the system intercepted kinetic energy penetrators and Metis anti tank missiles during a test in the U.S.

In early 2013, the MoD tested both the IMI Iron Fist and Rafael Advanced Defense Systems Trophy in a competition to select a single second-generation APS for IDF vehicles. Both systems were first-generation standard at the time. Both systems were financed concurrently until 2010, when the ministry's participation in funding the Iron Fist was suspended and limited procurement of the Trophy was initiated. In 2012, the ministry attempted to combine the two systems into one, utilizing the Iron Fist's interceptor and the Trophy's Elta radar and C3 system. Because Rafael would serve as the prime contractor instead of both companies being equal partners, IMI refused to cooperate. After 2013 trials, completion of a second-generation APS would be completed within a few years. IMI is also trying to market the Iron Fist internationally.

In December 2014, it was revealed that Rafael, Israel Aerospace Industries, and IMI had agreed to jointly develop a next-generation active defense system for vehicles, based on a combination of the Rafael/IAI Trophy and IMI Iron Fist. Rafael will act as the main contractor and system developer and integrator, and IAI and IMI will be subcontractors providing the radar and interceptor respectively. Unlike the Trophy's interception method, IMI's interceptor is based on an anti-missile missile. Interest for a vehicle APS grew significantly following Trophy's successful performance during Operation Protective Edge in mid-2014, where tanks equipped with the system intercepted dozens of ATGMs and RPGs, and suffered no injuries or false alarms. The Defense Ministry had pushed the companies to work together and combine their systems.

In June 2016, the U.S. Army chose to test the Iron Fist Light configuration to protect its light and medium armored vehicles as part of the Modular Active Protection System (MAPS) program. The decision to test Iron Fist was made mainly because of the system’s light weight. In December 2018, the Army revealed it would be installing Iron Fist on M2 Bradleys of one armored brigade as a near-term APS; an armored brigade consists of over 138 Bradleys. Difficulties for the vehicle to supply power to the system and intercept failures delayed integration, but those issues were resolved. The new version is called the Iron Fist Light Decoupled and there were significant changes to how it was installed on the vehicle. It also features a new countermeasure solution that has a 70% successful intercept rate and has the ability to counter drones. The U.S. Army intends to field a brigade set in 2025.

In December 2016, BAE Systems received a contract from the Netherlands to test the Iron Fist on their CV9035 infantry fighting vehicles. A decision for procurement was made in January 2021. Through a midlife update program all Dutch systems will be provided with this system.

In May 2019, it was announced that the US Army and the United Kingdom's Ministry of Defence planned to test the Iron Fist Light Decoupled (IF-LD) active protection system (APS).

In August 2019, Elbit Systems won an IMOD contract to install the Iron Fist active protection system on the IDF's new Eitan APC and the IDF's armored D9 bulldozers.

In November 2021, during FEINDEF 2021 (a defense fair celebrated yearly in Spain, similar to Eurosatory), Elbit Systems and Escribano Mechanical & Engineering signed an agreement for the integration of the Iron Fist APS onto Escribano's Guardian 30 unmanned turret, meant to be as well integrated in the IFV version of the Spanish Dragón VCR armoured fighting vehicle.
