= Arena (countermeasure) =

Arena Арена
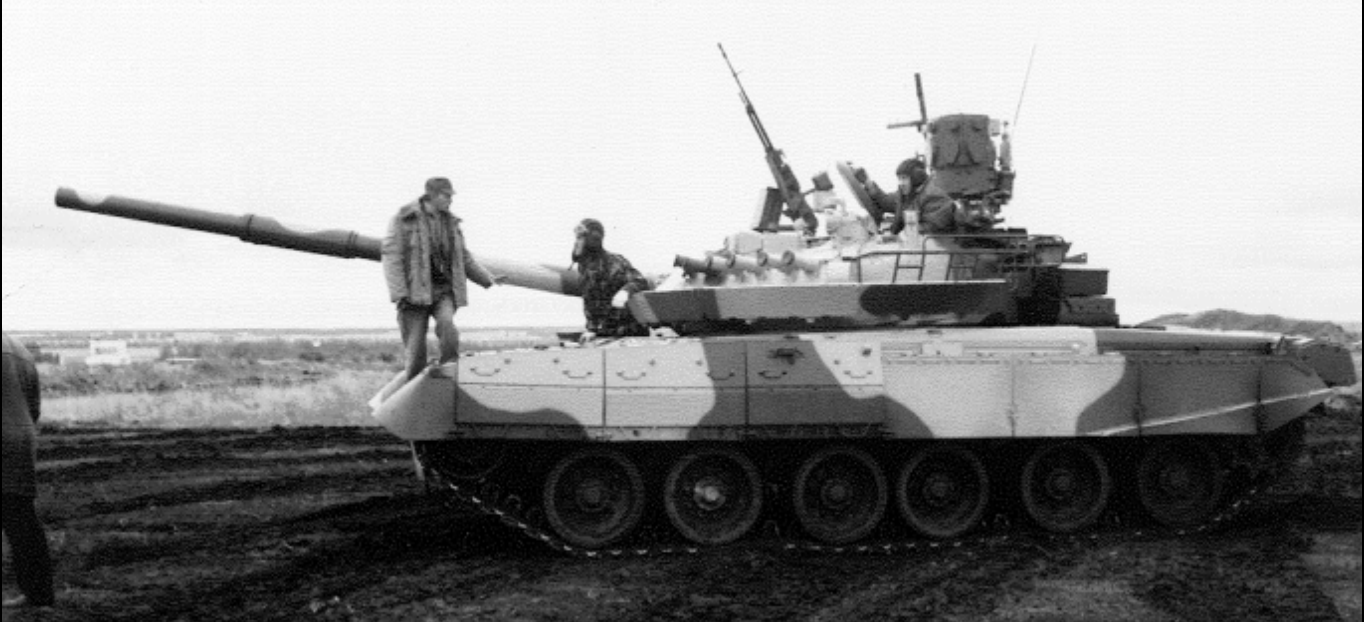
- Arena on T-80UM-1 at Omsk circa 1998. Elements of the Arena Active Protection System include ring of explosive panels at lower margin of turret ring and radar on turret roof.
- Type: Active protection system
- Place of origin: Russia

Service history
- Used by: Russia

Production history
- Designer: Kolomna Engineering Design Bureau (KBM)
- Designed: 1993
- Unit cost: US$300,000
- Variants: Arena-E (export) Arena-M (Modernized)

Specifications
- Mass: 1100kg

Arena (Russian: Арена) is an active protection system (APS) developed at Russia's Kolomna-based Engineering Design Bureau for the purpose of protecting armoured fighting vehicles from destruction by light anti-tank weapons, anti-tank guided missiles (ATGM), and flyover top attack missiles. It uses a Doppler radar to detect incoming warheads. Upon detection, a defensive rocket is fired that detonates near the inbound threat, destroying it before it hits the vehicle.

Arena is similar to Drozd, a Soviet active protection system from the late 1970s, which was installed on several T-55s during the Soviet–Afghan War. Drozd was followed by Shtora in the late 1980s, which used an electro-optical dazzlers or expendable so (smoke/IR smoke) to confuse the seeker head or defeat the user. In late 1994 the Russian Army deployed many armoured fighting vehicles to Chechnya, where they were ambushed and suffered heavy casualties. The effectiveness of Chechen rocket-propelled grenades against Russian combat vehicles prompted the Kolomenskoye machine-building design bureau to devise the Arena active protection system in the early and mid-1990s. An export variant, Arena-E, was also developed. The system has been tested on the T-80UM-1, demonstrated at Omsk in 1997.

== Background ==
The Soviet Union developed the first active protection system between 1977 and 1982, named Drozd (Russian: Дрозд). This system was designed as an alternative to passive or reactive armour, to defend against enemy anti-tank weapons. The system's development was stimulated in large part by the introduction of new high-explosive anti-tank warheads. Drozd was designed to destroy these warheads before they hit the armour of a vehicle being attacked. It was composed of three main parts: two launcher arrays placed on either side of the gun turret and an auxiliary power unit located to the rear of the turret. The arrays were controlled by two millimeter-wave radar antennae. The system used a 19 kilograms (42 lb), 107 millimeters (4.2 in) cone-shaped fragmentation warhead. Drozd could protect a tank between the elevations of −6 and 20 degrees along the vertical plane, and between 40 and 60 degrees along the horizontal plane. Although reported to offer an 80% increase in survival rate during its testing in Afghanistan, the radar was unable to adequately detect threats and the firing of its rockets caused unacceptably high levels of collateral damage. About 250 Drozd systems were manufactured, all of which were installed on T-55s belonging to the Soviet Union's naval infantry.

In the late 1980s, the Soviet Army began development of the Shtora-1 electro-optical jammer. It was first mounted on a T-80U in 1989, and later showcased on an Upgraded T-72B. Shtora-1 is designed to jam incoming SACLOS guided anti-tank missiles using a one-kilowatt infrared radiator. The Shtora-1 entered service on the T-80UK in 1991 and on the T-90 in 1992. In 1995, it was fitted on a Ukrainian T-84. The Shtora-1 system consists of an infra-red radiator interface station, composed of the jammer, modulator and control panel, a number of forward-firing grenade discharges capable of producing a smoke screen, a laser warning receiver and a general control panel. Shtora offers 360 degree all-around protection, between the elevations of −5 and 25 degrees. The system is activated when the laser warning system alerts the tank commander, who responds by pressing a button on his control panel which automatically orients the turret towards the threat. This triggers the grenade launch, creating a smoke screen to reduce the ability of the missile to lock-on the vehicle. The jammers are designed to jam the infra-red seekers on the inbound missiles. According to the manufacturers, Shtora decreases the chances of a tank being hit by an anti-tank missile, such as the Dragon, by a factor of 4–5:1.

The large number of Russia's casualties during the First Chechen War prompted Russia to consider the development of a new active protection system. During the Battle of Grozny, for example, the Russian Army lost between 200 and 250 armoured fighting vehicles to Chechen rebels. Vehicles which were knocked-out included main battle tanks such as the T-72 and T-80, and lighter armoured vehicles such as the BMP-2. The majority of tanks deployed to Chechnya were not issued with explosive reactive armour, due to the "lack of time and funds", while some of those that were issued with reactive armour did not have the explosive charge to start the reaction. Some of the most dangerous threats to Russian armour were rocket-propelled grenades fired from buildings in Grozny. As a result of these vulnerabilities, Kolomenskoye developed the Arena active protection system, with the goal of providing Russian armour more reliable protection against these threats.

== System details ==
Diagram

The Arena system was primarily designed to defeat threats such as the rocket propelled grenade and the anti-tank missile, including newer anti-tank missiles with longer ranges. The active protection system can protect against missiles fired from both infantry carried rocket launchers and from helicopters, which attack the vehicle directly or by overflying it. Modern rocket propelled grenades can penetrate almost 1 metre (39 in) of steel armour, posing a serious threat to tanks operating in environments of asymmetric warfare. Therefore, increased tank protection requires either an increase in armour thickness and weight, or alternatively the use of an active protection system, like Arena.

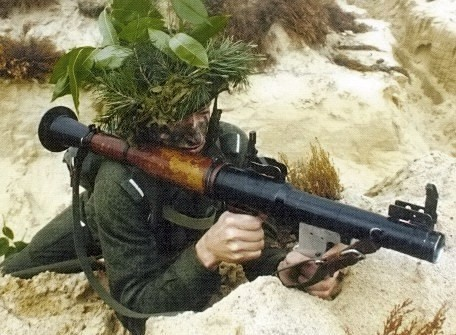
The system is designed to defeat light anti-tank weapons, such as this RPG-7.

The system uses a multi-function Doppler radar, which can be turned on and off by the tank commander. In conjunction with radar input, a digital computer scans an arc around the tank for threats, and evaluates which of the tank's 26 quick-action projectiles it will release to intercept the incoming threat. In selecting the projectile to use for defeating the threat, the ballistic computer employs the information processed by the radar, including information such as flight parameters and velocity. On the T-80UM, the computer has a reaction time of 0.05 seconds and protects the tank over a 300-degree arc, everywhere but the rear side of the turret. On the T-72M1, Arena covers the frontal 260-degrees. Arena ordinarily covers an elevation from -85 degrees to +65 degrees. On the BMP-3M, the Arena-E covers the frontal 275 degrees from an elevation of -5 degrees to +15 degrees. The system engages targets within 50 metres (55 yd) of the vehicle it is defending, and the ammunition detonates at around 1.5 metres (1.6 yd) from the threat. It will engage any threat approaching the tank between the velocities of 70 metres per second (230 ft/s) and 700 metres per second (2,300 ft/s), and can disregard false targets, such as outgoing projectiles, birds and small caliber bullets. If the computer detects that the projectile is heading towards an already discharged panel it can rotate the turret to point an active panel at the threat. Arena works during the day and night, and the lack of electromagnetic interference allows the system to be used by multiple vehicles as a team. The 27-volt system requires approximately one kilowatt of power, and weighs around 1,100 kilograms (2,400 lb). Arena increases a tank's probability of surviving a rocket-propelled grenade by between 1.5–2 times.

Shtora was a soft-kill system, designed to passively defeat anti-tank missiles by jamming their guidance systems. By contrast, Arena is a hard-kill system like Drozd, designed to destroy the warhead through the use of munitions before the missile can engage the vehicle being protected.

== Arena-M ==
In November 2021, details of the new Arena-M system were revealed. It was a derivative of the existing Arena system. The designer KB Mashinostroyeniya claimed that Arena-M was capable of countering missiles coming from any direction. Somewhat before that, the Industrial Director of state defense firm Rostec claimed that ARENA-M could intercept all modern anti-tank guided missiles including true top-attack missiles like the FGM-148 Javelin and Spike ATGM. At the time, the system was planned to be installed on main battle tanks like the T-90 and T-72.

During the full scale invasion of Ukraine, that started in February 2022, Russia early on lost a large number of armored vehicles to anti-tank guided missiles. A big part of these losses was caused by modern ATGMs like the Javelin. This would imply that equipping their armor with Arena-M should have become a Russian priority. In April 2023, T-90 and T-80 tanks were said to eventually get the Arena-M. Russian state news agency RIA Novosti was a bit more specific and said Russia would soon equip its T-90M and T-80BVM tanks with Arena-M. It also said that Russia was researching the installation of the system on T-72B3 and T-72B3M tanks. The mention of the T-90M, T-80BVM, and T-72B3 suggests that Arena-M would only be installed as part of a general overhaul of a tank.

Originally, Arena-M was designed to detect high-speed munitions such as anti-tank missiles and artillery shells. The appearance of drones made that during further development, engineers had to adapt the system to combat these slower threats. In 2024, the system was officially tested for service and a contract was signed to install the system on the T-90M. In 2025, Uralvagonzavod said it was producing vehicles equipped with Arena-M.

In early July 2026, the Russian army in Ukraine received its first T-72B3A tanks. A key feature of these was the installation of the Arena-M system. The crews then spent some time training with the new system.

The first combat use of the T-72B3A with Arena-M took place near Maiak in Donetsk Oblast on 23 July 2026. On 24 July, footage from Ukrainian kamikaze FPV drones showed drones striking the back of a T-72B3A tank without any reaction by the system. At first, this was taken as proof that Arena-M did not work. Later analysis indicated that the system had managed to intercept a dozen FPV drones before running out of APS charges. According to experts and soldiers at the front line, the system therefore worked relatively well despite its shortcomings. A specific problem was that by 2026, Ukraine’s drone tactics had evolved to overwhelming a tank with a dozen or more FPV attacks in a single engagement.

== Development ==
Arena evolved from the earlier Shater (Tent) active protection system first fitted to the Obiekt 478M. Arena was first fitted to the Obiekt 219E, a T-80B series experimental tank that later became known as the T80BM1. The existence of this program was revealed in 1992.

The Arena active protection system was first tested at the Kubinka proving grounds in early 1995, successfully defending a Russian tank against an anti-tank guided missile. A Russian T-80UM-1, with Arena, was first demonstrated to the public at Omsk in late 1997. Arena was also mounted on the BMP-3M modernization package, developed by the Kurganmashzavod Joint Stock Company, although the package has received no export orders.

Arena was to be fitted on the Russian Black Eagle which debuted in 1998. As of 2011, Arena had not entered quantity production.

== Exports ==
As of 1996, the German–French firm TDA was reported to have been involved in further developing Arena. In 1998, American defense contractor General Dynamics Land Systems (GDLS) proposed licensing Arena from KBM for sale to Turkey and the United States. For the Turkish Land Forces, GDLS sought to integrate Arena onto the M60-2000 and M1A2 Abrams. For the U.S. Army, GDLS proposed integrating Arena onto the M1A1 and M1A2 Abrams tanks. As of 2000, Russia had agreed to the deal pending U.S. approval.

In 2011, Russia offered India the Arena system for use on the T-72. It is unknown whether India accepted any deliveries of Arena as of 2011.

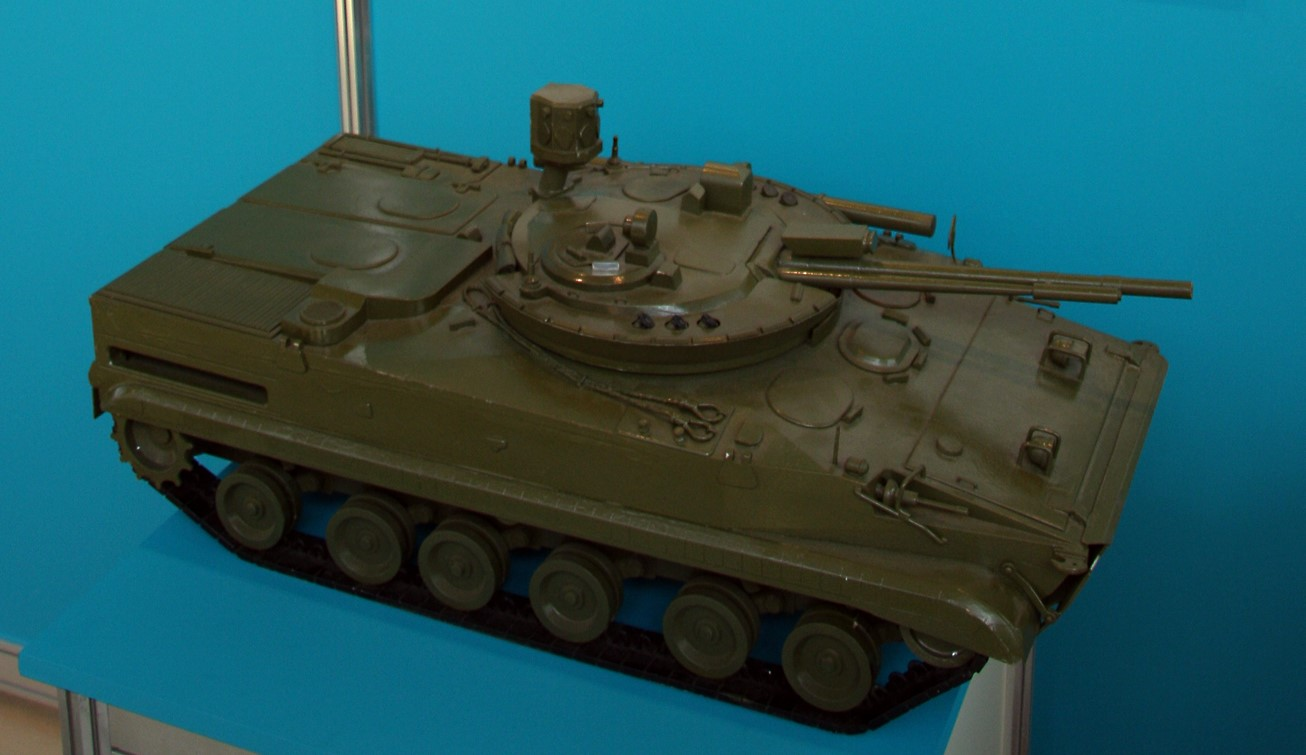
Arena-E on BMP-3 model, 2008

An export variant, named Arena-E (Арена-Э), is available, costing an estimated $300,000. It weighs about 900 kilograms (2,000 lb). In 2007 South Korea and KBM Design Bureau reached an agreement to fit the Arena-E on the K2 main battle tank. The agreement was worth about US$27.5 million.
