= Drozd =

Soviet active protection system

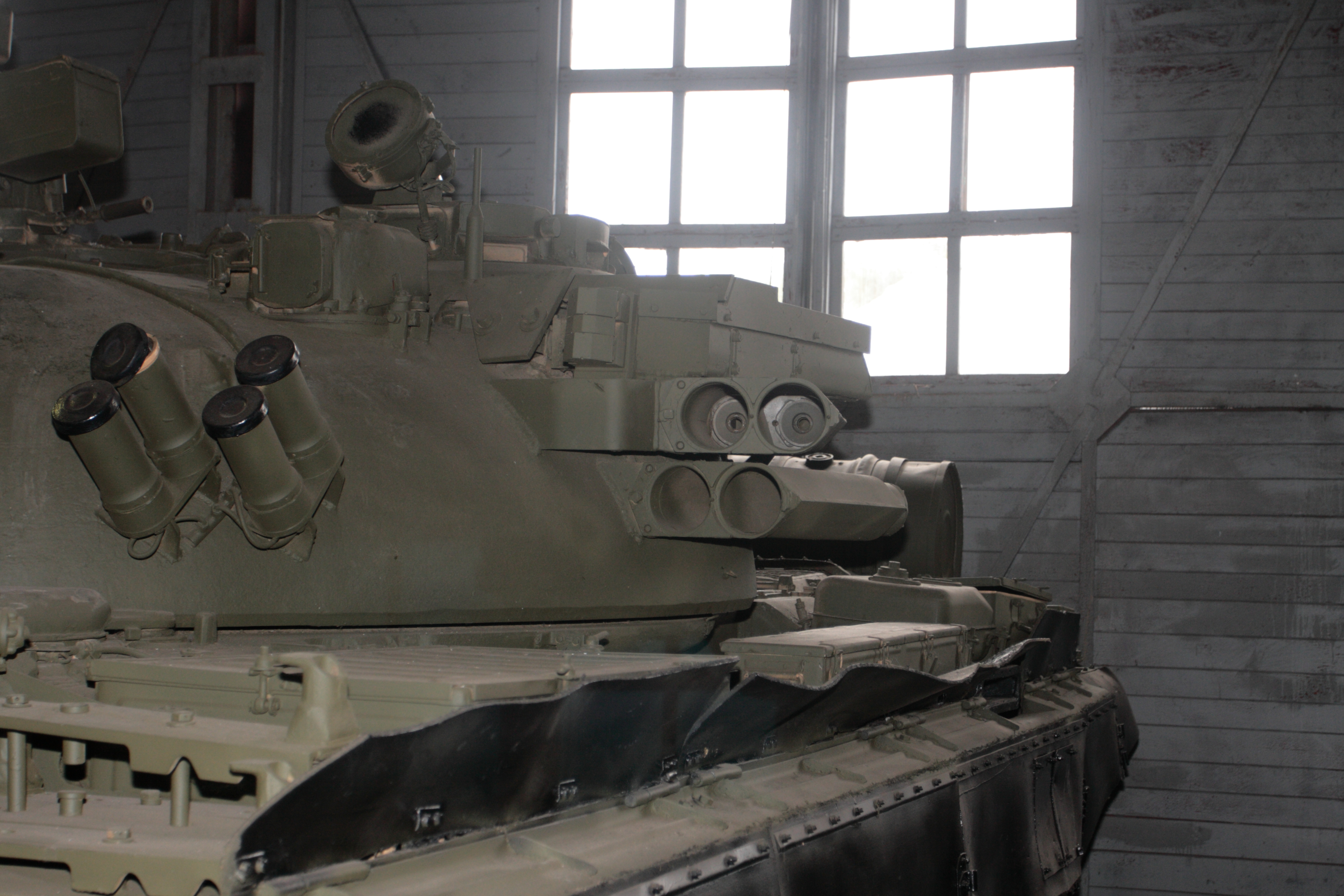
T-55AD with "Drozd" APS. Kubinka Tank Museum

Drozd (Russian: Дрозд, IPA: [ˈdrost] , lit. 'thrush') is an active protection system (APS) developed in the Soviet Union, designed for increasing tanks' protection against anti-tank missiles and RPGs. It is considered the world's first operational active protection system, created in 1977 and 1978 by the KBP design bureau of A. G. Shipunov as Kompleks 1030M-01. Its chief designer, Vasily Bakalov, was awarded the Lenin Prize for his work on its development.

Drozd uses 24.5 GHz Doppler radar to detect incoming rounds travelling between 70 and 700 m/s (to avoid engaging small arms or other faster projectiles). Its computer determines when to fire a 107 mm projectile. When the incoming round is at 7 m range, the Drozd fragmentation warhead detonates, spreading 3-gram slugs to destroy the incoming round. The Drozd system was relatively complex, requiring a radar array and two launch tubes on each side of the tank turret, and a large electronics package on the turret rear.

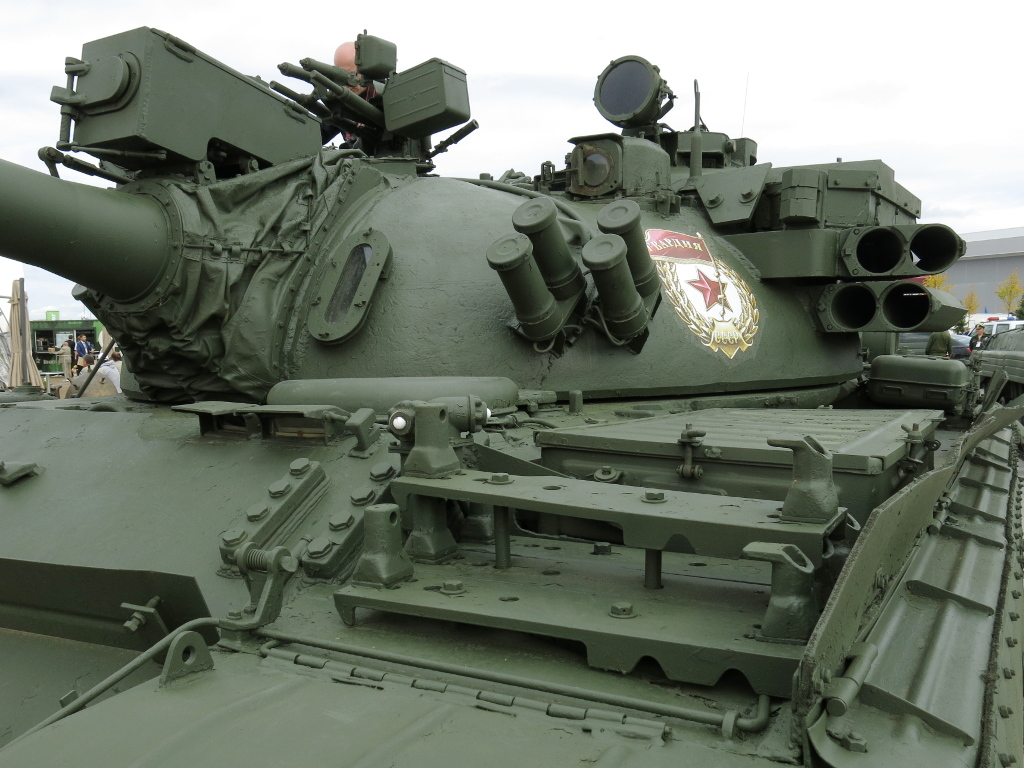
Drozd installed on a T-55AD, 2016

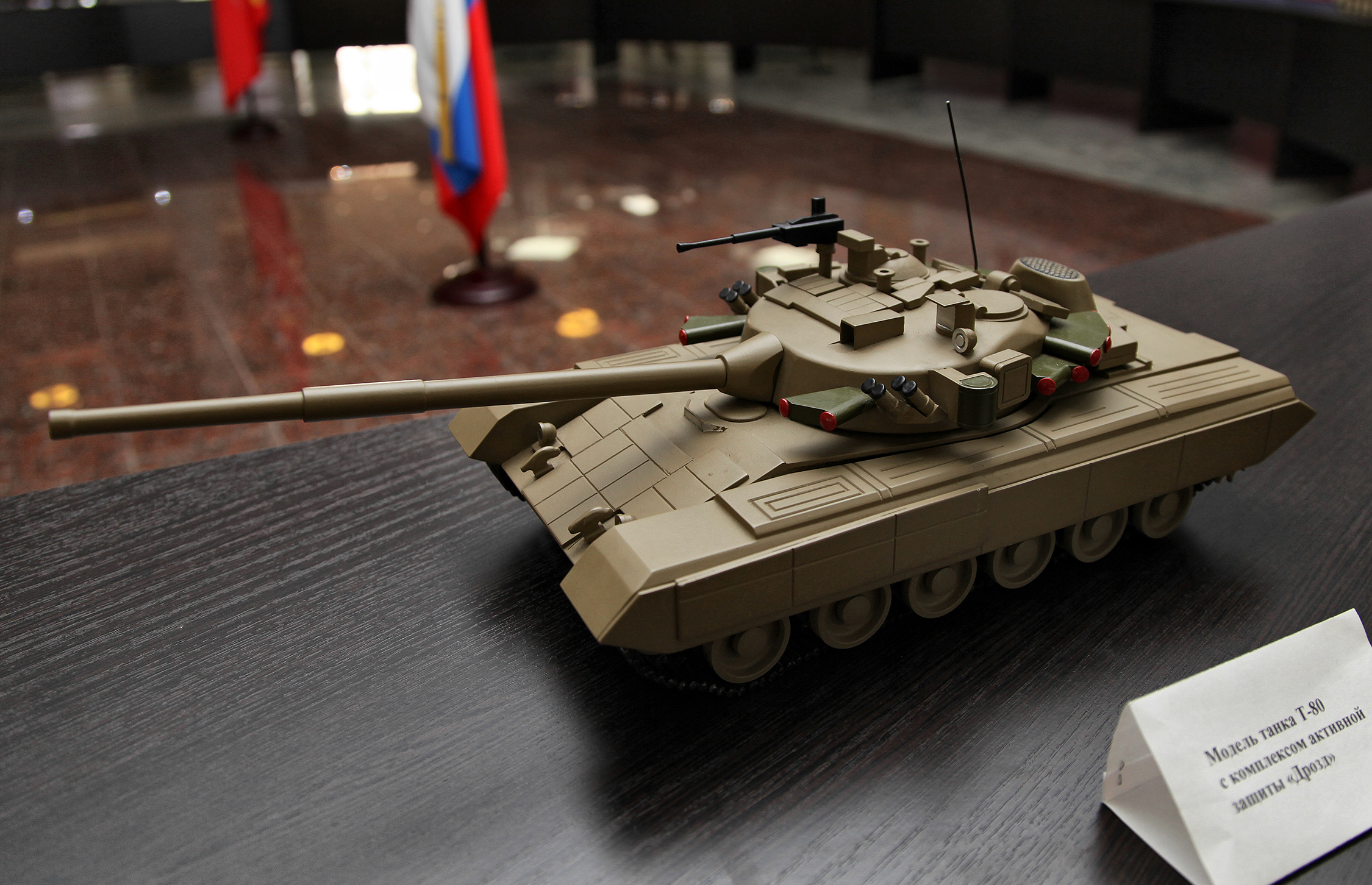
Drozd on T-80 model, 2013

One of Drozd's shortcomings was that it was only able to protect a 60-degree arc around the forward part of the turret. Each unit costs around $30,000, was 80 percent successful against incoming RPGs in Afghanistan, but caused too much collateral damage to surrounding troops that were dismounted from their armored vehicles.

The project was abandoned by the Army, but completed by the Soviet Naval Infantry to increase protection for about 250 older T-55 tanks in 1981–82 (newer T-72s were problematic on landing craft, due to size and weight, and $170 million Drozd development was much cheaper than a commencement of an all-new time-consuming tank design). Tanks were upgraded to T-55M standard and equipped with Drozd at the tank rebuilding plant in Lviv, Ukraine, and kept in war stores for secrecy. The rebuilt tanks were designated T-55AD, or T-55AD1 if they had the newer V-46 engine. Drozd APS was later replaced by the simpler non-APS Kontakt-5 explosive reactive armour.

Drozd was also fitted to a small number of T-62s, which were designated T-62D or, if fitted with the V-46-5M engine upgrade, T-62D-1.

Drozd was exported in small numbers to China and to an undisclosed Middle-Eastern client. It was subsequently discontinued. The Drozd-2 system was developed to give a 120-degree protection arc with more projectile launchers. It was intended to be installed on the then-upcoming T-80U main battle tanks. One prototype vehicle (T-80UM-2) fitted with the system was used in Ukraine and lost in March 2022. An even more sophisticated all-round active protection system is the Arena Active Protection System.
