= Nakidka =

Russian camouflage pattern

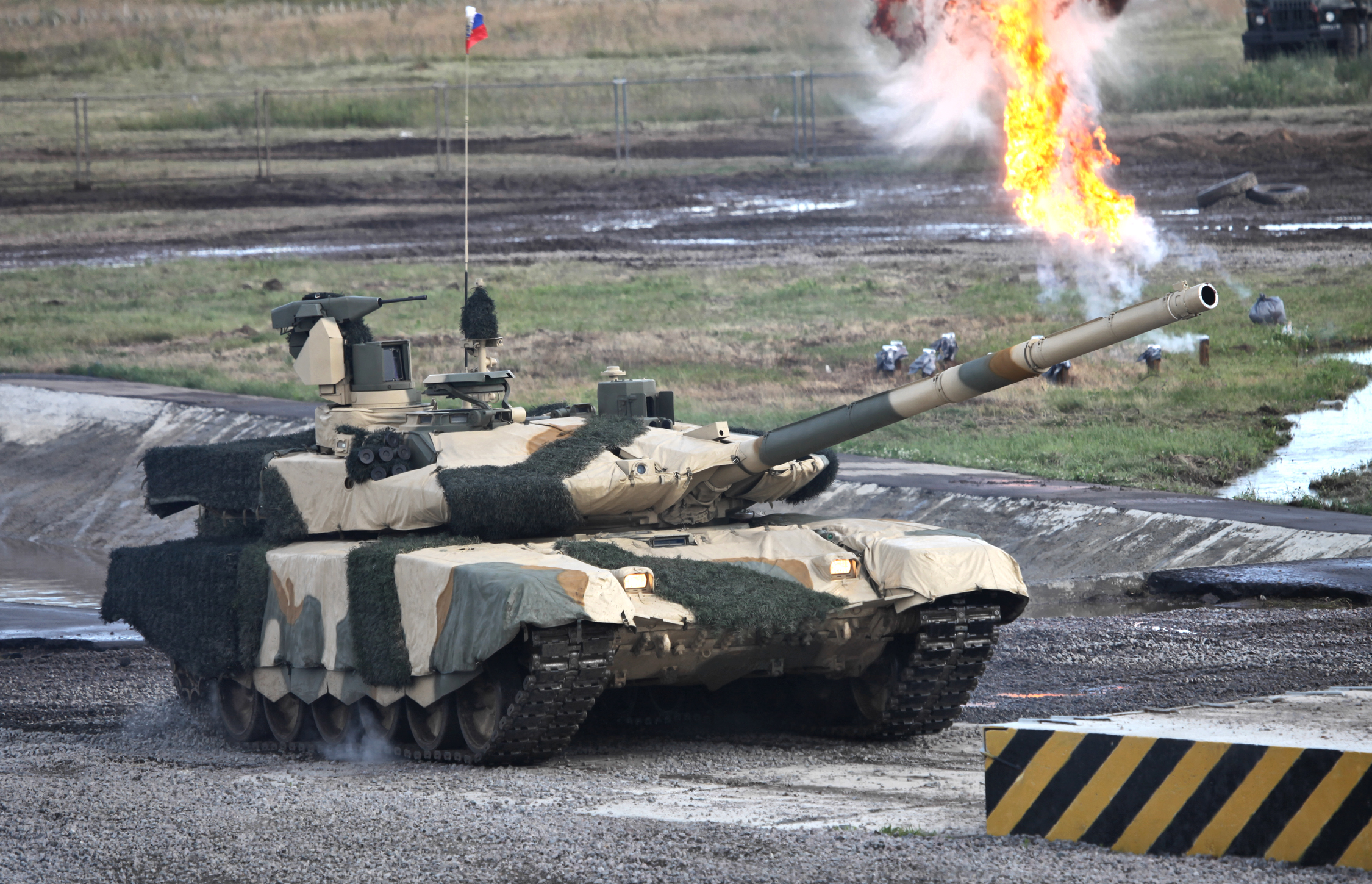
- A tank equipped with RAM camouflage. Various parts are painted, draped in fabric, or covered with strips of astroturf.
- Type: Military camouflage pattern
- Place of origin: Russia

Service history
- Wars: Russo-Ukrainian War; Russian invasion of Crimea; War in Donbas; Russian invasion of Ukraine

Nakidka (Russian: Накидка) is a Russian radar-absorbent material (RAM) camouflage that "eliminates the use of precision-guided weapons".

== History ==
Nakidka entered serial production in June 2023.

== Design ==
Nakidka reduces the infrared, thermal, and radar band signatures of an object. It can be mounted on armored fighting vehicles, field fortifications, command posts, permanent air and vehicle sheds, and ammunition and fuel depots by infantry with no special equipment.

According to NII Stali (Scientific Research Institute of Steel), which designed Nakidka, it reduces the chances of detection by day/night viewers and TV systems and seekers by thirty percent, infrared seekers by two- to three-fold and radar by six-fold, and reduces the thermal-radar signature to near-background levels. Nakidka is efficient in the optical, IR and radar wavelength bands up to 12 cm (4.7 in), and also reduces the radar cross section by 10 db.

Nakidka weighs 2 kilograms per square metre (0.41 lb/sq ft) and can be deployed in 0.4–1.0 man hours per square meter. It is also capable of withstanding combat conditions, such as taking small arms fire or a napalm attack. It is said to have a long maintenance-free service life.

== Demonstration ==
In 2006, during the Russian Expo Arms and International Defense Exhibition of Land Forces, a T-72BM "Rogatka" (an upgraded T-72B) fitted with Nakidka was demonstrated. A T-72B and a T-90S fitted with a signature reduction package based on Nakidka were also featured. Since then, that "signature reduction package" has become a standard component of the T-72B.

To reduce its visibility, the new 2S19M2 artillery self-propelled howitzer uses a set of camouflage system to reduce the thermal heat of the vehicle and increase protection against radar, thermal and optical detection by more than 1.5 times, thereby reducing the effectiveness of high-precision weapons.

Because the addition of cage armor would normally negate the camouflage properties of Nakidka, NII Stali offers special rubber side screens which would fit over cage armor and reduce the vehicle's visibility further.

== Deployment ==
On September 18, 2022, in Kharkiv Oblast, Ukraine, a T-90M equipped with Nakidka was captured by Ukrainian forces.

In early 2023 a Russian T-90M was supposedly targeted by a Javelin which engaged and disabled the tank normally, despite being fully equipped with Nakidka.

== Users ==
- Russia
