= EMT-7 =

Countermine system

EMT-7 is a Russian electromagnetic countermine system for clearing minefields and defense against magnetic mines and enemy armor. It projects an electromagnetic pulse to detonate antitank mines and disrupt electronics before the tank reaches them.

The EMT-7 system has been tested on the T-72 and T-90 main battle tanks.
