= Russian Expo Arms =

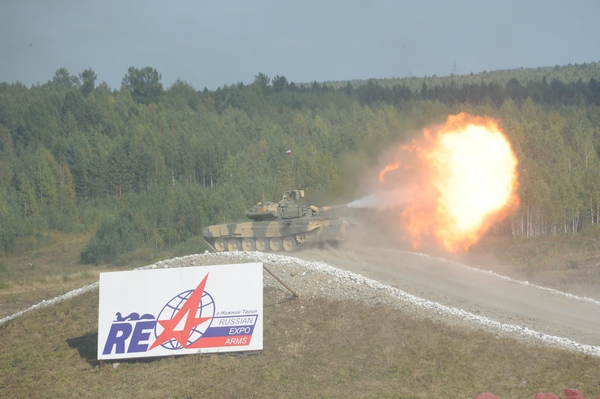
T-90S main battle tank fires during the 2011 exhibit.

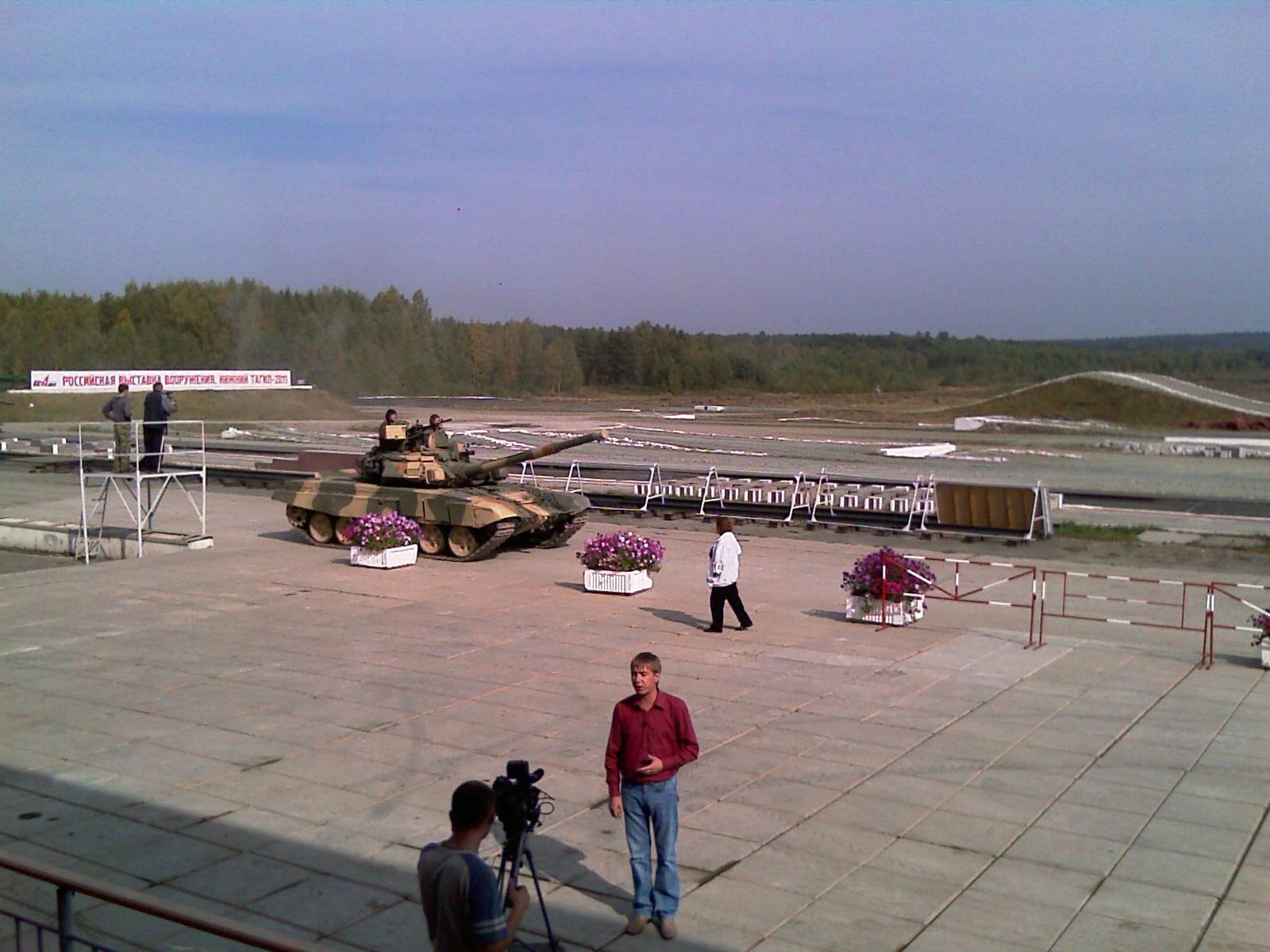
Exhibit rehearsal at Staratel test range on September 6, 2011, with T-90S main battle tank in the background

Russian Expo Arms (or Russia Arms Expo, abbreviated as RAE) is the international exhibition of arms, military equipment and ammunition that is regularly held in Nizhny Tagil, Russia since 1999.

According to organizers, the event is dedicated to "active innovative policy of the enterprises of the defense and industrial complex, adoption of advanced technology are guarantees of success of modernization and creation of samples of armament and military equipment, and perspective view of Armed Forces of Russia."

The venue of the exhibit is the Staratel test range at Nizhny Tagil Institute of Metal Testing (NTIIM). The main exhibitor is the Nizhny Tagil-based Uralvagonzavod machinery plant. In recent years, the core products presented at the event are modifications of T-90, most advanced Russian series tank.

The 8th exhibit was held on September 8–11, 2011. Russian prime minister Vladimir Putin, Sverdlovsk Oblast governor Alexander Misharin and many other top officials have to attended the event. About 300 Russian and international arms manufacturers have participated with around 2,500 products.

== Russia Arms Expo 2013 (RAE 2013) ==
The Exhibition seeks to promote Russian military equipment, arms and ammunition to both domestic and foreign markets, expand the range of foreign partners, demonstrate the latest achievements of the Russian and foreign manufacturers, develop business contacts between producers and buyers of the military equipment, weapons and ammunition from around the world.

== Russia Arms EXPO 2013 features ==
- Intensive conference programme

== Areas covered by the Exhibition ==
- Military equipment and its components
- Weapons and their components
- Unmanned aerial vehicle (UAVs) of aeroplane, helicopter and balloon types
- Ammunition and its components. Firing of self-propelled, field, tank, anti-tank, anti-aircraft, naval and airborne artillery
- Logistical equipment, resources and assets
- Equipment for railway troops

== Russian Defense Expo ==
Russian Defense Expo is the parallel exhibit held at the same site alternately, in the years when RAE isn't held. It is dedicated to non-armed support vehicles for military, emergency and other forces.
