= Black Eagle (tank) =

Object 640 Black Eagle (Чёрный орёл)
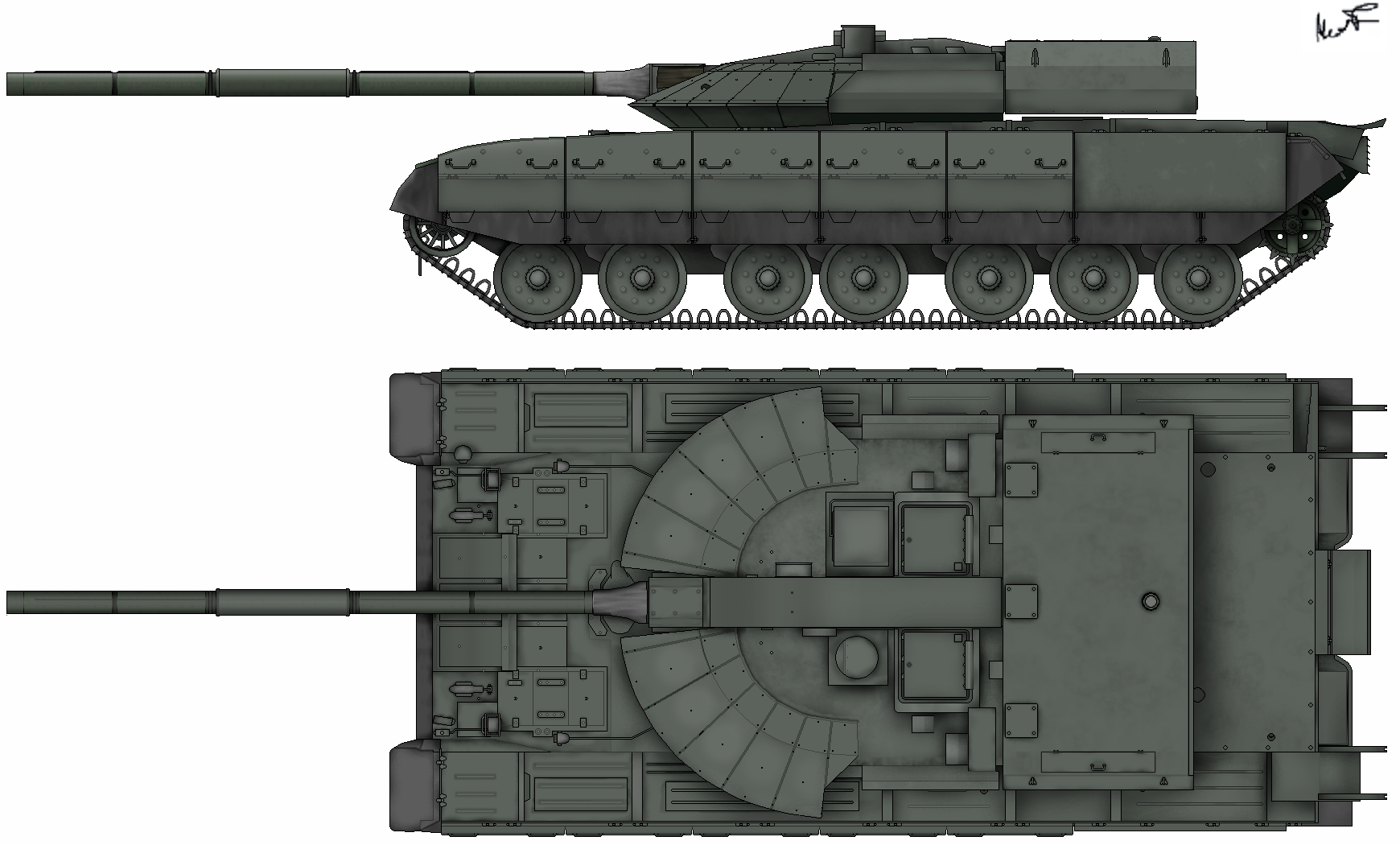
- Rendition of the tank.
- Type: main battle tank
- Place of origin: Russia

Service history
- In service: not in service

Production history
- Designer: Kirov Plant
- Designed: late 1980's
- Manufacturer: Omsktransmash
- Produced: 1997, 1999
- No. built: 2
- Variants: object 640 (1997), object 640 Black Eagle (1999)

Specifications
- Mass: 48 t
- Length: 10.2 m (gun forward); 7.1 m (hull)
- Width: 3.58 m
- Height: 2 m (by turret roof); 2.4 m (by optics)
- Crew: 3
- Armour: hull: 3x 50 mm BTK-1Sh steel and 2x 35mm textolite array + Kontakt-5 ERA at 68° angle turret: unknown; likely 300 or 600 mm composite array + Kaktus ERA
- Main armament: 1x 125 mm 2A46M4 gun
- Secondary armament: prototype: none planned: 1x 12.7 mm NSV-T or 1x 12.7 mm Kord
- Engine: prototype:GTD-1250 gas turbine engine planned: GTD-1400 gas turbine engine GTD-1250: 1250 h.p. GTD-1400: 1400 h.p.
- Power/weight: 26-29 hp/t
- Transmission: hydro-mechanical, 4 forward gears, 1 reverse gear
- Suspension: torsion bar
- Ground clearance: 45 cm
- Maximum speed: 70-80 kph (forward); 11 kph (reverse)

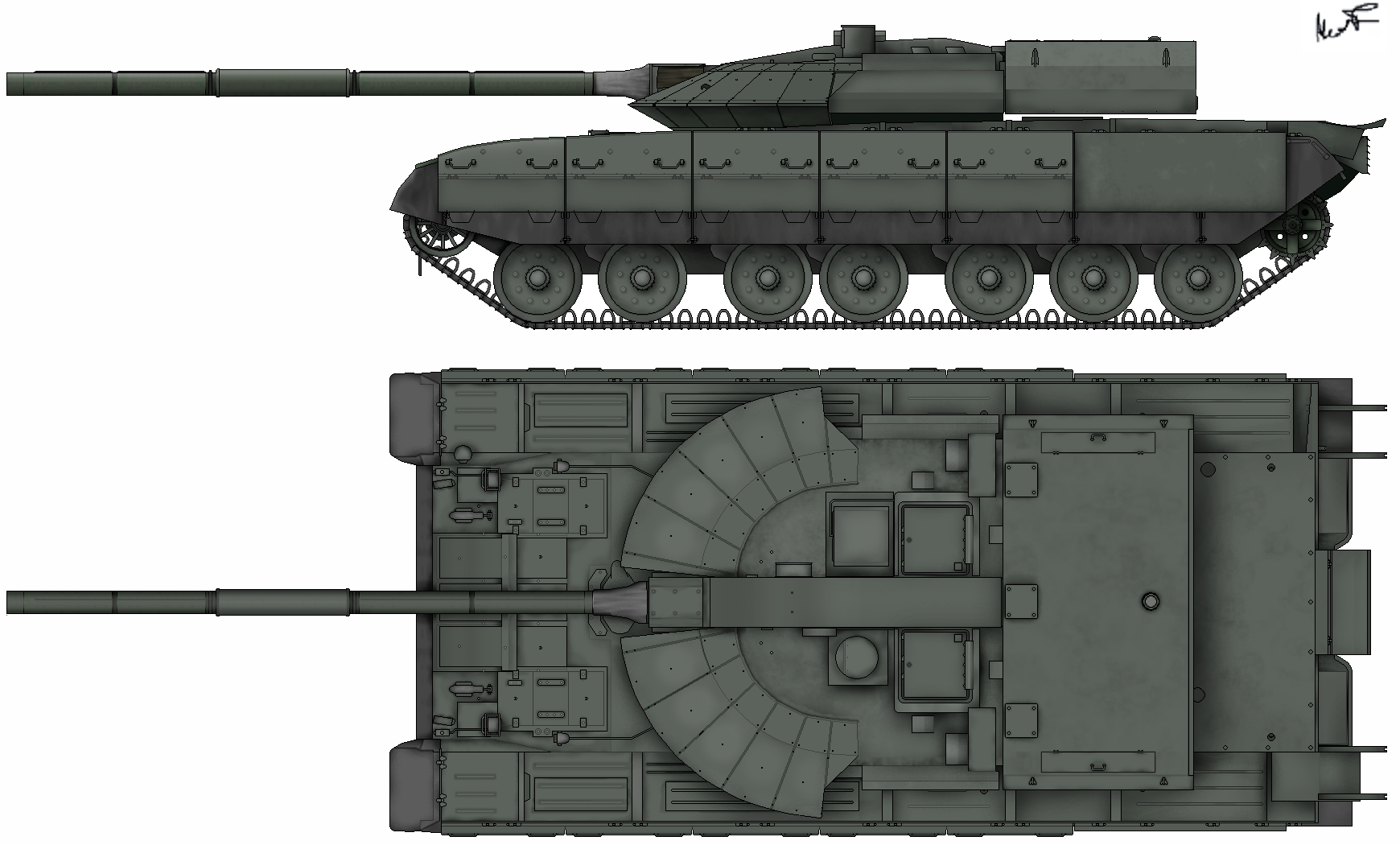
Graphical representation of the longer chassis variant

The Black Eagle tank (Russian: Чёрный орёл, Chyornyy Oryol) or Object 640 was a presumed prototype main battle tank based upon the T-80U, developed by the KBTM design bureau of Omsktransmash in the late 1990s for the Russian Federation. The Black Eagle was cancelled, with all production and development stopped in 2009.

The company developing the tank, Omsktransmash, went bankrupt, with its designs and projects absorbed into Uralvagonzavod and state-owned services. Before the acquisition Uralvagonzavod was developing the Object 195 in competition to the Black Eagle, and then owned the rights to both projects. However, the Russian government withdrew all support and funding for both projects, and they were superseded by the T-14 Armata, which was also being developed by Uralvagonzavod.

== Development ==
=== History and design ===
Development started during the 1980s, when the design bureau of the Leningrad Kirov Plant (LKZ) developed a new design based on the stretched T-80U chassis. The bureau closed, and the documentation was transferred to KBTM in Omsk.

A mock-up of the Black Eagle was first demonstrated at the VTTV arms exposition in Omsk, in September 1997, making a single brief pass, far from the reviewing stands. The tank appeared to be a T-80U hull topped by a very large turret and gun, obscured by camouflage netting and canvas.

An early prototype was shown at an arms exposition in Siberia, in June 1999. This tank had an elongated hull with seven pairs of road wheels instead of the T-80's six, and a turret still mostly obscured by camouflage netting. Later footage and photographs revealed it without the netting, where gunner sight on the right, commander's panoramic sight on the left, and Arena APS launchers have become clearly visible. On each side of the turret, there were three forward-facing and four side-facing APS charges, turning it up to fourteen charges in total.

The tank was based on a lengthened T-80U hull, with an extra pair of road wheels and a new turret. It appeared to have had very thick turret front armour and new-generation multi-layered Kaktus (Russian: Кактус, "cactus") ERA on it. Two additional Kontakt-5 ERA modules were mounted on each side of the hull, to the existing three on each side. The new welded turret was much smaller and had a different shape instead of the traditional dome shape of previous Soviet and Russian main battle tanks: it was rounded from the front, entirely flat on the sides, and in the rear it has a large box-shaped turret bustle with autoloader in it, the latter designated as Izdeliye 2195617 (Russian: изделие 2195617, "Product 2195617").

Main constructional features

According to Russian reports, the Black Eagle design had abandoned the carousel-style autoloader in the fighting compartment for an autoloader mounted in the large western-style turret bustle, which incorporates a blow-out armoured ammunition compartment for crew safety, like the U.S. M1 Abrams, the German Leopard 2, the French Leclerc and several other modern western tanks. It is reported that the autoloader design itself was referenced by Leclerc's example. The prototype had a 125 mm tank gun, but it was stated that it may have accommodated a 152 mm gun, larger than the 120 and 125 mm-calibre guns of main battle tanks in service.

=== Cancellation and fate ===
The Black Eagle project was formally cancelled in 2001 by Omsktransmash. Development of the Black Eagle was stopped due to financial problems, questions about the reliability of the design and, most importantly, the terrible performance of the T-80 upon which it was modeled in the first Chechen war. The T-80 performed so poorly that after the conflict General-Lieutenant A. Galkin, the head of the Main Armour Directorate, convinced the Minister of Defence to never again procure tanks with gas-turbine engines. This included the Black Eagle, which was later cancelled in 2009. Omsktransmash attempted to appeal the decision, but were unable to pursue the appeal after filing for bankruptcy in 2002.

In late 2011 it was announced that some technical solutions developed for the Black Eagle tank and Uralvagonzavod's Object 195 would be incorporated into the Armata Universal Combat Platform.

As early as at least in 2014, a photograph of Black Eagle, T-80UM1 Bars and other armored fighting vehicles from Omsktransmash museum has appeared. In early 2022, a photograph of the Black Eagle tank, behind a BMMP infantry fighting vehicle, appeared as well, signalizing the prototype may still exist inside the Omsktransmash factory.
