= Omsktransmash =

Russian vehicle manufacturer

- Native name: Омский завод транспортного машиностроения
- Company type: State owned unitary enterprise
- Industry: Automotive, Arms industry
- Founded: Railway workshops: 1896; Military production: 1942
- Headquarters: Omsk, OMS, Russia
- Products: Military vehicles, Self-propelled artillery, Multiple rocket launchers, tractors, excavators, metal castings, washing machines, other metal products
- Parent: Uralvagonzavod
- Website: transmash-omsk.ru

Omsktransmash (Russian: Омский завод транспортного машиностроения, lit. 'Omsk transport machine factory') is a wholly state-owned engineering company based in the city of Omsk, Russia. The company was best known in the West during the Cold War period for its production of armoured vehicles such as the T-80 tank. The design bureau of the company, KBTM, was also responsible for the BTR-T amphibious APC, TOS-1 multiple rocket launcher and 2S19 "Msta-S" self-propelled howitzer.

== History ==
The beginnings of the organisation were in 1896 with the creation of a railway engineering workshop. The plant expanded in 1942 and gained its current importance when factories in Ukraine (Luhanskteplovoz) and Leningrad were evacuated to beyond the Ural mountains during the second world war. During that period the plant produced the T-34 tank.

Tractor production began in 1993.

In the post-Soviet Union period the state's decision to fund tank production at Uralvagonzavod in Nizhny Tagil (manufacturer of the T-90 tank) at the expense of the Omsk factory caused financial ruin for the company. The organisation had designed a new prototype tank, named Black Eagle but it did not enter production. Although the plant received work modernising T-62 and T-72 tanks this did not provide sufficient income and in 2002 the company went bankrupt.

In 2004 the design arm of the business was absorbed into Uralvagonzavod.

The military production at the plant was acquired by JSC KBTM (ОАО Конструкторское бюро транспортного машиностроения) (Note: Joint stock company "Design Bureau of Transport Machinery") in 2007.

In 2008 bids were taken for the sale of the non-military part of the enterprise, the winner being ChTZ-Uraltrak (ЧТЗ-Уралтрак). (Note: Tracked vehicle manufacturer) However, the transaction was disallowed by the monopoly commission Federal Antimonopoly Service (FAS) (Russian: Федеральная антимонопольная служба (ФАС)) due to complaints from Uraltrak's creditors Sberbank that they had not been paid.

In December 2009, JSC KBTM purchased the second part of Omsktransmash using funds provided by the Federal government.

On 12 September 2022, CEO of the Omsktransmash plant Vasily Kovalev announced that since the beginning of the Great Patriotic War for more than 80 years ago, the plant produced almost 30,000 various tanks starting with the famous T-34 model to the latest T-80BVM modification.

It was reported in April 2024 that the company has increased the production of heavy flamethrower systems by 2,5 times in 2023.

== Products and facilities ==
As well as formerly manufacturing tanks and other military vehicles, the company also produces a variety of wheeled industrial vehicles in both two- and four-wheel drive based on a 'tractor' chassis:

Other products include "Омь-1,5" and "Омь-2,0" washing machines, gate valves for pipelines, jacks, conveyors and other general industrial machinery and tools.

== Ownership and Management ==
The current Head and Chief Designer of KBTM is A. E. Sulin.

From 1960 to 1994, the Head and Chief Designer of KBTM was A. A. Morov (born in 1927), recipient of two Orders of the Red Banner of Labour, the Order of the October Revolution, the Order of Lenin, and a laureate of the USSR State Prize.

From 1972 to 1996, the General Director of the Omsk Production Association “Transport Engineering Plant named after the October Revolution” was S. A. Katyk, Hero of Socialist Labour (1981), a tank operator and colonel.

From 1994 to 2003, the Head and Chief Designer of FSUE KBTM was B. M. Kurakin.

From 2003 to 2008, the Head and Chief Designer of FSUE KBTM was I. K. Shumakov.

From 1996 to 2001, the General Director of the Federal State Unitary Enterprise "Omsk Transport Engineering Plant" was A. M. Vishnyakov.

From 2001 to 2003, the General Director of FSUE "Omsk Transport Engineering Plant" was A. A. Morov (born in 1955).

From 2008 to 2011, the General Director and Chief Designer of OJSC KBTM was I. K. Shumakov.

From 2011 to 2022, the General Director was I. E. Lobov, and the Chief Designer was I. K. Shumakov.

== See also ==
- Kirov Plant Tank and machine building factory in St. Petersburg
