= T-80 =

Soviet main battle tank

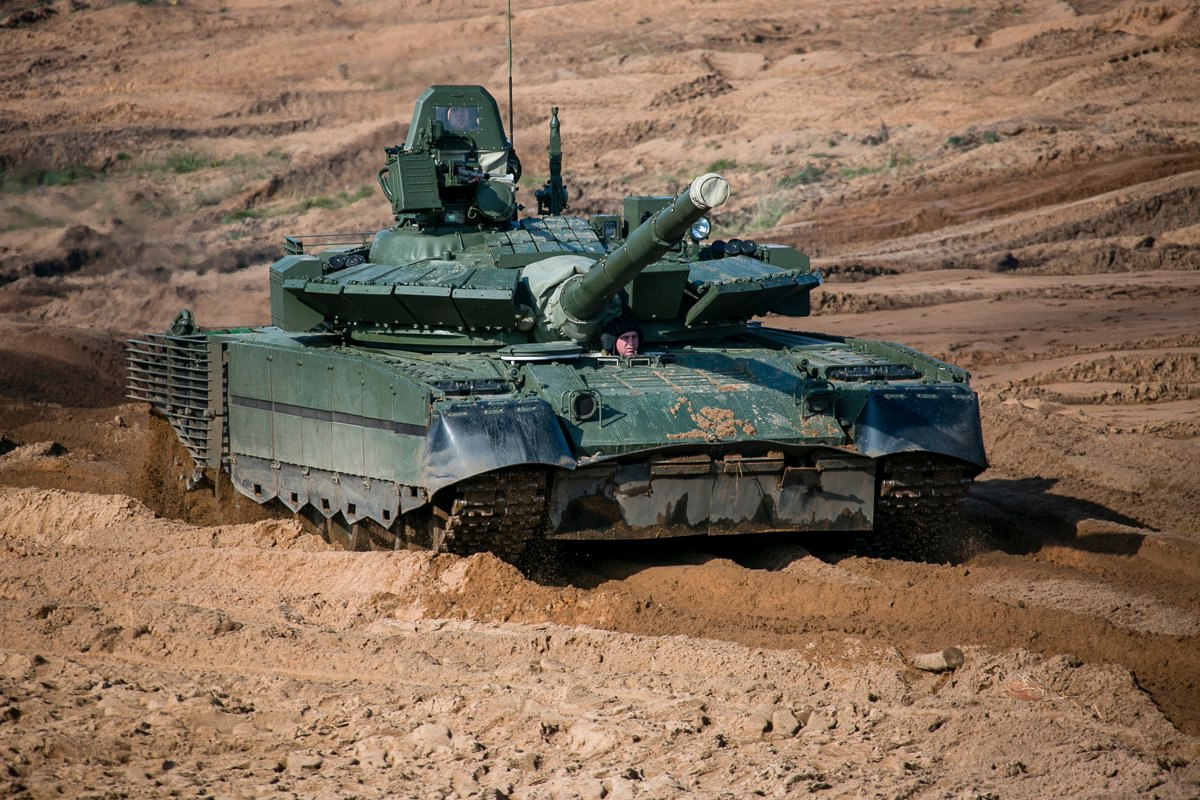
- T-80BVM, the latest variant of the T-80.
- Type: Main battle tank
- Place of origin: Soviet Union

Service history
- In service: 1976–present
- Used by: See Operators
- Wars: August Coup; 1993 Russian constitutional crisis; First Chechen War; Yemeni Civil War; Russo-Ukrainian War; 2022 Russian invasion of Ukraine; Russo-Ukrainian war (2022–present); Wagner Group rebellion

Production history
- Designer: Nikolay Popov, LKZ (T-80) KMDB (T-80UD)
- Designed: 1967–1975
- Manufacturer: LKZ and Omsk Transmash, Russia; Malyshev Factory, Ukraine
- Unit cost: US$3 million
- Produced: 1975–2001 (T-80); 1987–present (T-80UD)
- No. built: 5,500+
- Variants: Engineering & recovery, mobile bridge, mine-plough with KMT-6 plough-type system and KMT-7 roller-type system.

Specifications (T-80B / T-80U)
- Mass: 42.5 tons (T‑80B), 46 tons (T‑80U)
- Length: Gun forward: 9.9 m (32 ft 6 in) T-80B, 9.654 m (31 ft 8.1 in) T-80U; Hull: 7.4 m (24 ft 3 in) T-80B, 7 m (23 ft 0 in) T-80U
- Width: 3.4 m (11 ft 2 in) T-80B; 3.603 m (11 ft 9.9 in) T-80U
- Height: 2.202 m (7 ft 2.7 in) T-80B, T‑80U
- Crew: 3
- Armour: T-80B – Hull 440–450 mm vs APFSDS 500–575 mm vs HEAT, Turret 500 mm vs APFSDS 650 mm vs HEAT; T-80U – Hull & turret with Kontakt-5 780 mm vs APFSDS 1,320 mm vs HEAT
- Main armament: Smoothbore 125 mm 2A46-2 gun, 36 rounds and 4 9M112 Kobra ATGMs (T-80B); 2A46M-1 with 45 rounds and 6 9M119 Refleks ATGMs (T-80U)
- Secondary armament: 7.62 mm PKT coax MG, 12.7 mm NSVT or DShK or PKT antiaircraft MG
- Engine: SG-1000 gas turbine T-80B, GTD-1250 turbine T-80U, or one of 3 diesel T‑80UD; 1,000 hp T-80B, 1,250 hp T‑80U
- Power/weight: 23.5 hp (17.6 kW) / tonne T-80B; 27.2 hp (20.3 kW) / tonne T-80U
- Transmission: Manual, 5 forward gears, 1 reverse T-80B, 4 forward, 1 reverse T-80U
- Suspension: Torsion bar
- Ground clearance: 0.38 m (1.2 ft) T-80B, 0.446 m (1.46 ft) T-80U
- Fuel capacity: 1,100 litres (240 imp gal) (internal); 740 litres (160 imp gal) (external)
- Operational range: 335 km (208 mi) (road, without external tanks); 415 km (258 mi) (road, with external tanks)
- Maximum speed: 70 km/h (43 mph) (T-80U); 48 km/h (30 mph) (cross country)

The T-80 is a main battle tank (MBT) that was designed and manufactured in the former Soviet Union and manufactured in Russia. The T-80 is based on the T-64, while incorporating features from the later T-72 and changing the engine to a gas turbine. When it entered service in 1976, it was the first production tank to be powered solely by turbine. (Note: The first tank to use a gas turbine as a main engine was the prototype British Conqueror FV200 Turbine Test Vehicle. The Swedish Stridsvagn 103 featured a turbine, but as part of a hybrid power pack that also used a diesel engine.)

The chief designer of the T-80 was Soviet engineer Nikolay Popov. The T-80U was last produced in 2001 in a factory in Omsk, Russia. In 2023, the CEO of Uralvagonzavod announced that production would restart.

The Ukrainian T-80UD diesel engine variant continued to be produced in Ukraine. The T‑80 and its variants are in service in Belarus, Cyprus, Egypt, Kazakhstan, Pakistan, Russia, South Korea, Ukraine and Uzbekistan. Ukraine further developed the T‑80UD as the T‑84.

== History ==
=== Development ===
The project to build the first Soviet turbine powered tank began in 1949. Its designer was A. Ch. Starostienko, who worked at the Leningrad Kirov Plant (LKZ). The tank was never built because available turbine engines were of very poor quality.

In 1955, two prototype 1,000 hp (746 kW) turbine engines were built at the same plant under the guidance of G. A. Ogloblin. Two years later a team led by Josef Kotin constructed two prototypes of the Object 278 tank. Both were hybrids of the IS-7 and the T-10 heavy tanks, powered by the GTD-1 turbine engine, weighing 53.5 tonnes and armed with an M65 130 mm tank gun. The turbine engine allowed the tank to reach a maximum speed of 57.3 km/h (35.6 mph), however with only 1,950 liters of fuel on board, their range was limited to only 300 km (190 mi). The two tanks were considered experimental vehicles and work on them eventually ceased.

In 1963, the Morozov Design Bureau designed the T-64, normally powered by the 5TDF diesel engine. They also experimented with the T-64T with GTD-3TL turbine engines which generated 700 hp (522 kW). This was tested until 1965. At the same time, at Uralvagonzavod, a design team under the guidance of Leonid N. Kartsev created the Object 167T tank. In 1964, in its report to First Secretary Nikita Khrushchev, the team reported that the design was not worth pursuing partly due to its high fuel use.

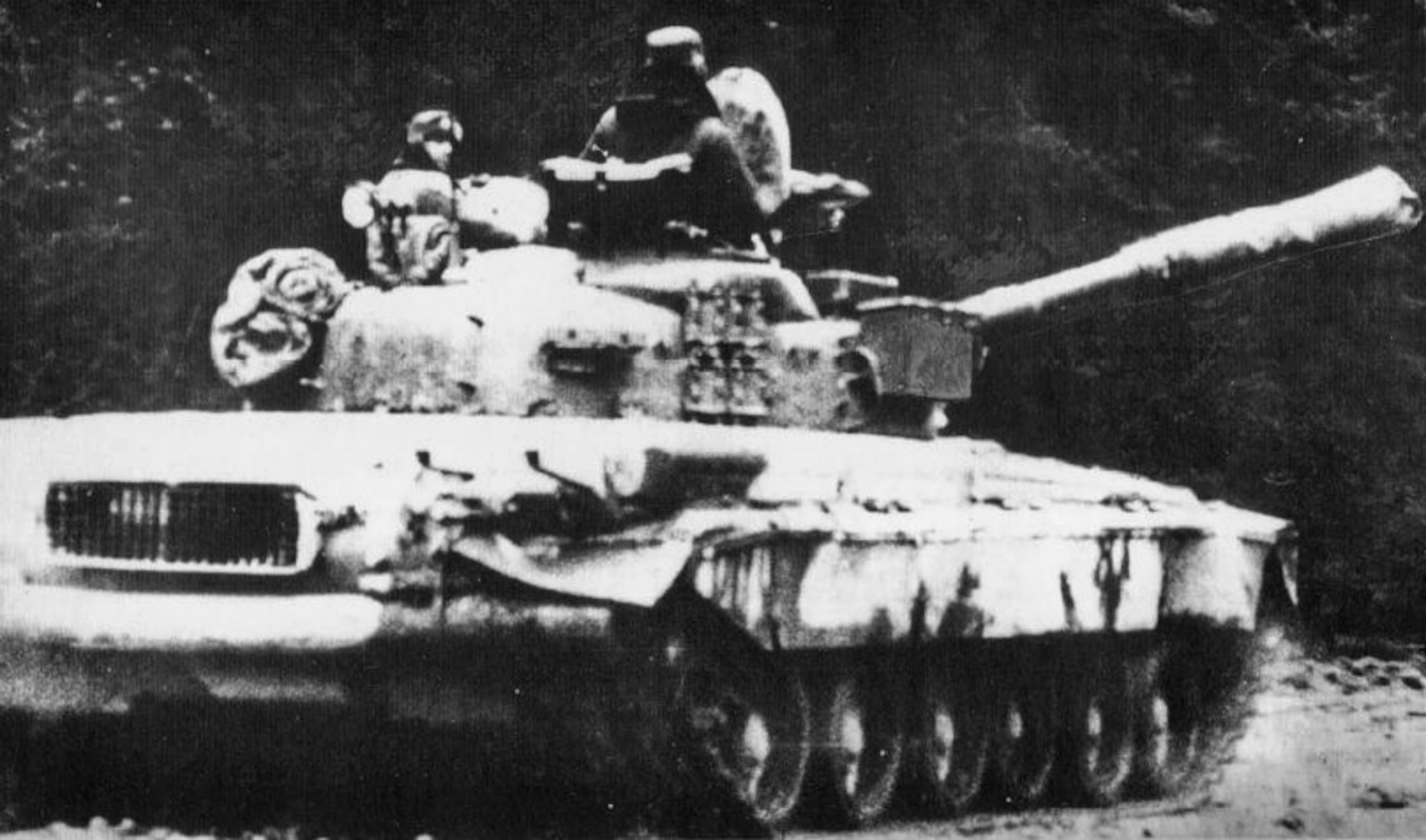
Soviet T-80 during manoeuvres, March 1986.

In 1960, Khrushchev ended all heavy tank programs. LKZ, concerned with the poor reliability of the 5TD engine of the T-64, was freed to focus on gas turbine tank engine development. In 1967, the S. P. Izotov bureau at the Klimov Research-Production Association was assigned to this project. Rather than re-purpose an existing helicopter engine, Izotov built the GTD-1000T from scratch.

In 1966, the LKZ built the experimental Object 288 "rocket tank," powered by two Klimov GTD-350 turbine engines from the Mil Mi-2 helicopter, offering a combined power of 691 hp (515 kW). Trials indicated that twin propulsion was no better than the turbine engine which had been in development since 1968 at LKZ and Omsktransmash.

==== Object 219 ====
The tank from LKZ equipped with this turbine engine was designed by Nikolay Popov. It was constructed in 1969 and designated Object 219 SP1. It was essentially the T-64T powered by a GTD-1000T multi-fuel gas turbine engine producing up to 1,000 hp (746 kW). During the trials it became clear that the increased weight and dynamic characteristics required a complete redesign of the vehicle's suspension. The second prototype, designated Object 219 SP2, received bigger drive sprockets and return rollers. The number of road wheels was increased from five to six. The construction of the turret was altered to use the same compartment, 125 mm 2A46 tank gun, autoloader and placement of ammunition as the T-64A. Some other equipment was borrowed from the T-64A. The LKZ plant built a series of prototypes based on Object 219 SP2.

== Production history ==
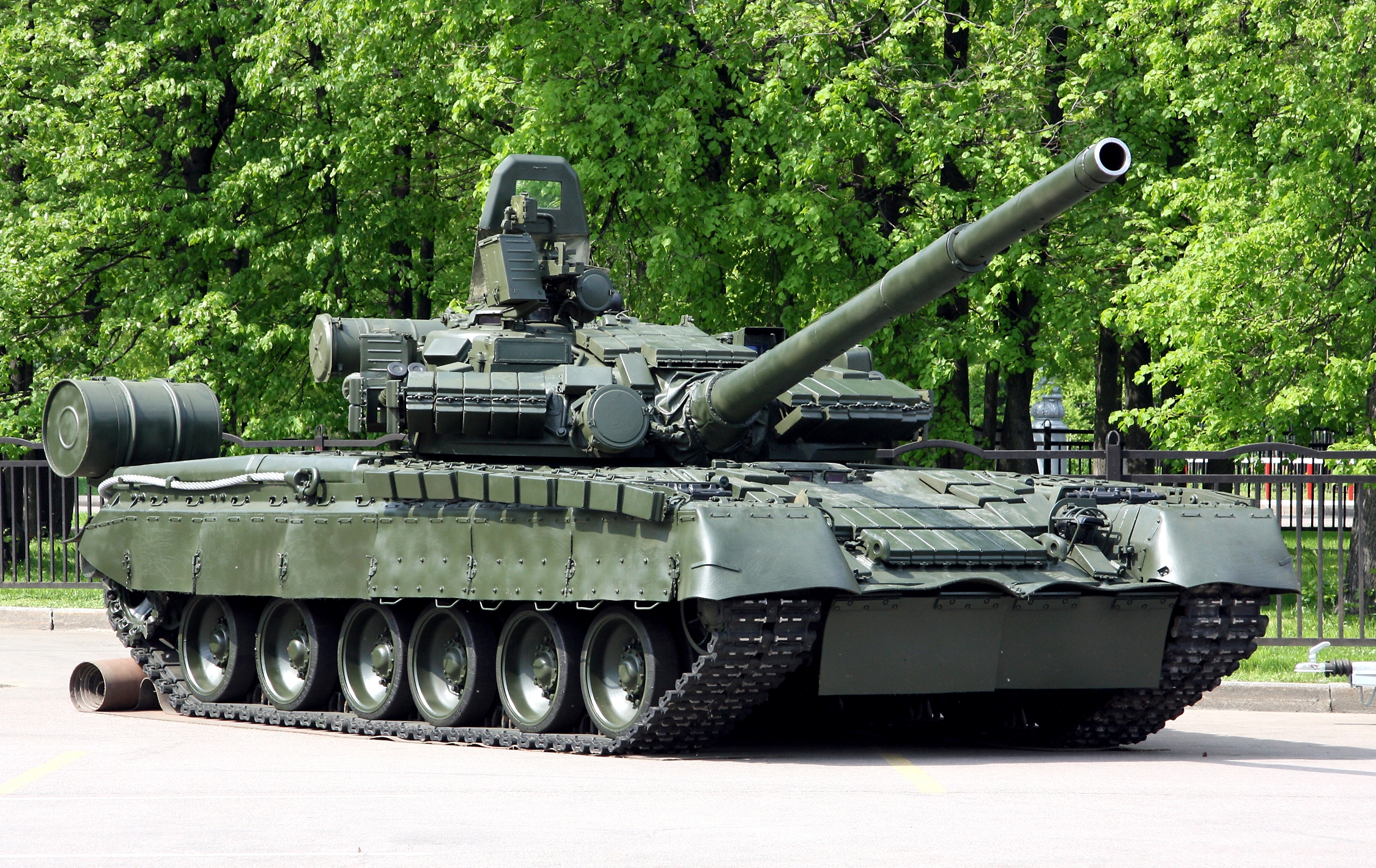
This T-80BV has reactive armour adapted to its turret and hull. The later T-80U has a large appliqué of explosive reactive armour installed — providing higher crew and tank survivability than prior models.

In November 1974, Minister of Defence Andrei Grechko, denied approval to put Object 219 into production due to the tank's high fuel use and lack of advantages in armament and armour over other tanks then in production. Grechko died in April 1976, and Dmitry Ustinov, an enthusiastic supporter of Object 219, was appointed in his place. Object 219-2 was accepted for production as the T-80 in August 1976.

Object 219R, incorporating Combination K composite armour, was accepted for Soviet service in 1978 as the T-80B. Production of the original T-80 ended that same year. The T-80B entered production at Omsktransmash in 1979. Omsk developed a command version called the T-80BK. The T-80B was deployed with the Group of Soviet Forces in Germany in 1981.

Initially, the T-80 was confused with the Soviet T-72 by some Western analysts. They are the products of different design bureaus; the T-80 is from the SKB-2 design bureau of the Kirov Factory (LKZ) in Leningrad while the T-72 is from the Uralvagonzavod factory in Nizhny Tagil. They are similar in superficial appearance, but the T-80 is based on the earlier T-64, while incorporating features from the T-72, which was a complementary design. The T-64 in turn was an earlier high-technology main battle tank, designed by the Morozov Design Bureau in Kharkiv to replace the T-54/55 and T-62 MBTs, used before in the Soviet Union.

From a distance, the T-64, T-72 and T-80 look alike. Despite the similarities, the T-80 is 90 cm longer than the T-64, and the T-80 and T-72 are mechanically very different. The T-72 is mechanically simpler, easier to manufacture, and easier to service in the field. As such, the T-72 was intended to be a tank mass-produced to equip the bulk of the Soviet motor rifle units, and for sale to export partners and Eastern-bloc satellite states.

The T-80 design improved on several aspects of the earlier T-64 design, introducing a gas turbine engine in the original model, (Note: Denied for many years by Western analysts.) and incorporating suspension components of the T-72. This gave the tank a high power-to-weight ratio and made it easily the most mobile tank in service, albeit with acute range problems, as the turbine used fuel rapidly, even at engine idle. (Morozov's subsequent parallel development of the T-80UD replaced the gas turbine with a commercial turbo-diesel, to decrease fuel use and maintenance needs.) In comparison to its anticipated opponent, the American M1 Abrams has a larger, 1,500 hp (1,120 kW) gas turbine, but weighs 61 tons compared to the T-80s 42.6 tons, so it has a worse power-to-weight ratio of 24.5 compared to 27.1 and is less maneuverable than the gas turbine-powered T-80. The T-80 can fire the same 9K112 Kobra (AT-8 Songster) anti-tank guided missile through the main gun as the T-64.

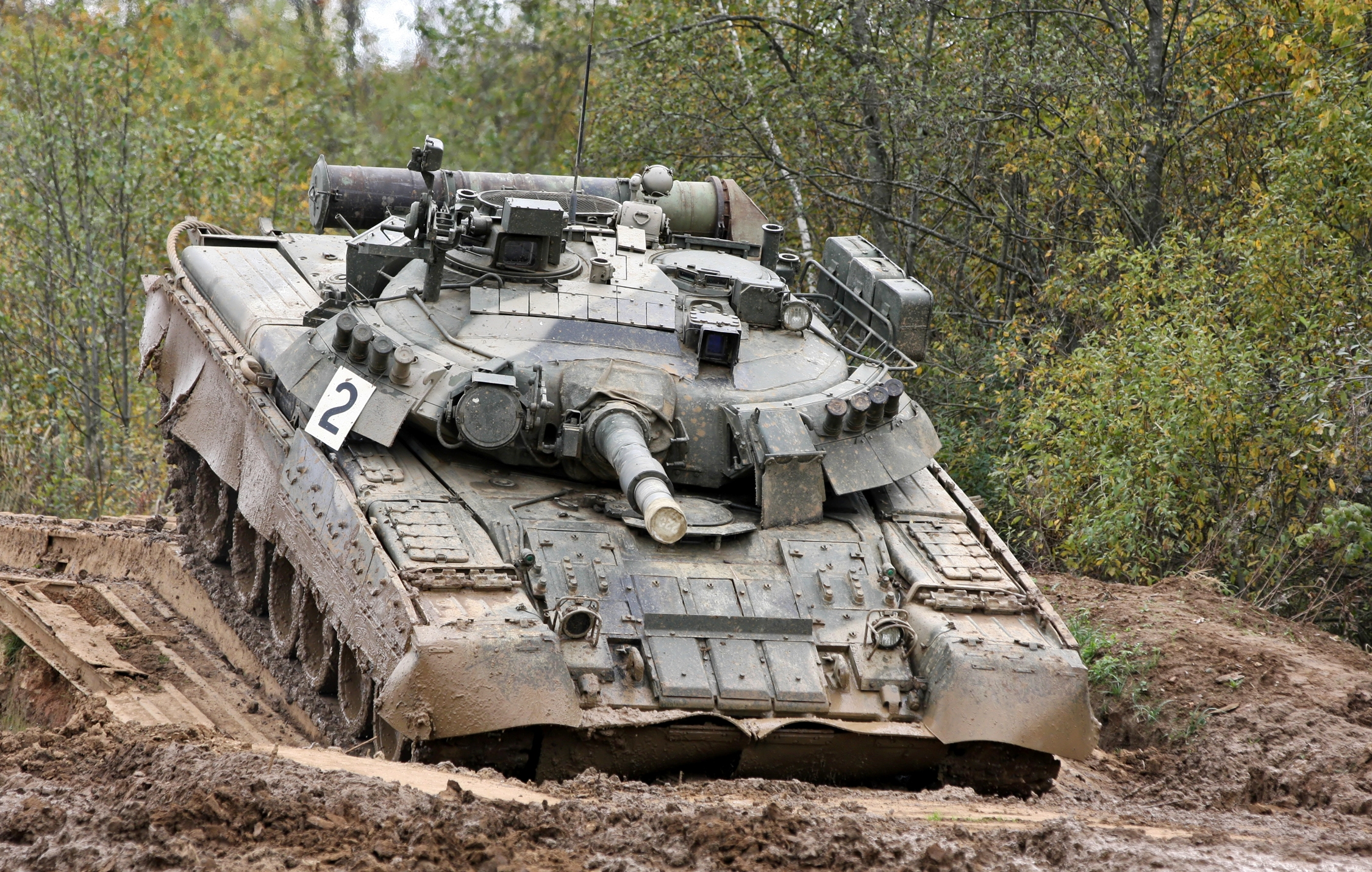
Russian T-80U of the 4th Tank Brigade, 2011

The T-80U main battle tank (1985, "U" for uluchsheniye, meaning "improvement") was designed by SKB-2 in Leningrad (hull) and the Morozov Bureau (turret and armament). It is a further development of the T-80A and is powered by the 1,250 hp (919 kW) GTD-1250 gas turbine. It is a step ahead of the GTD-1000T and GTD-1000TF engines that were installed on the previous tanks of the T-80 line. This gas turbine can use jet fuels, diesel, and low-octane gasoline, and has good dynamic stability, service life, and reliability. The GTD-1250 has a built-in automatic system of dust deposit removal. It retains the T-80s high fuel use, which the Russian army found unacceptable during the First Chechen War. It is equipped with the 2A46 fire control system and a new turret. The T-80U is protected by a second generation of explosive reactive armour called Kontakt-5, which can reduce the penetration of armour-piercing fin-stabilized discarding sabot (APFSDS) rounds, such as the M829A1 "Silver Bullet", by 38%, and of high-explosive anti-tank (HEAT) rounds. Kontakt-5 had been developed as a response to the threat of modern APFSDS spurred by testing that found that the Israeli 105mm M111 APFSDS ammunition could defeat the glacis armour of the latest models of the T-72 and T-80.

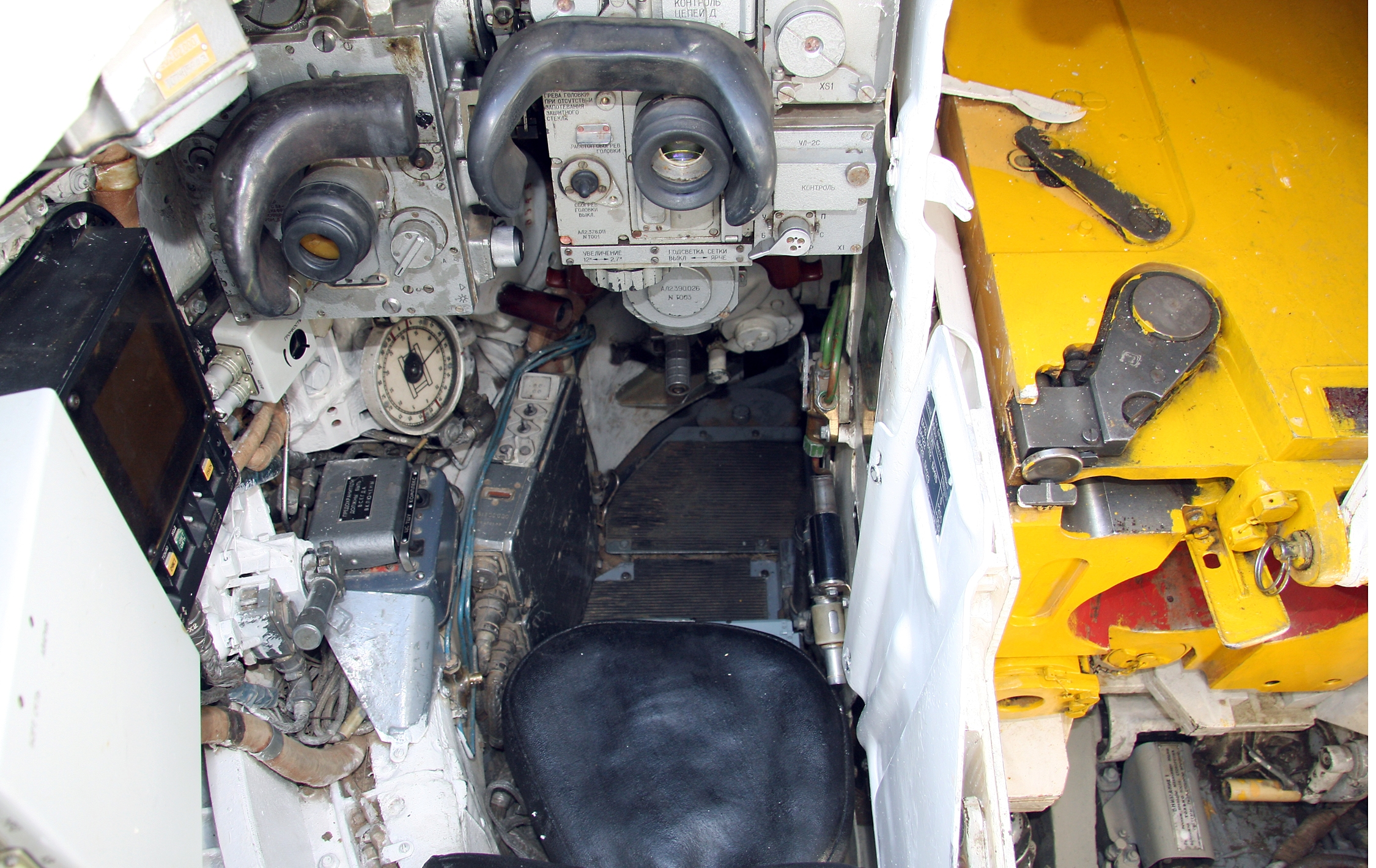
T-80U gunner position

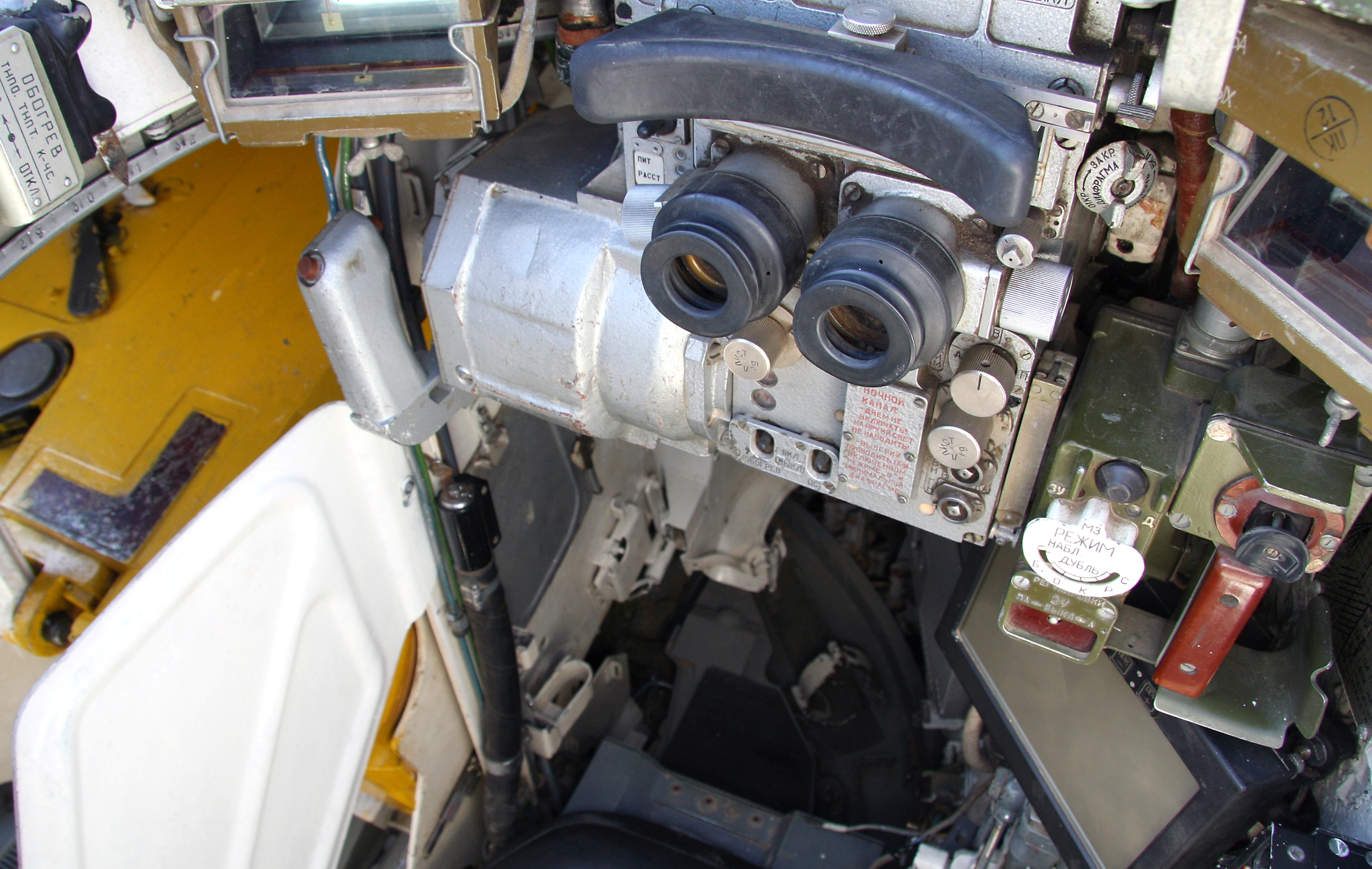
T-80U commander position

The Kontakt-5 is integrated into the design of the turret, hull, and Brod-M deep wading equipment. Like all of the previous T-80 models, the T-80U has full length rubber side skirts protecting the sides with those above the first three road wheels being armoured and are provided with lifting handles. It can fire the 9M119 Refleks (AT-11 Sniper) guided missile and the long-rod penetrator (HVAPFSDS) 3BM46. The remotely controlled commander's machine gun was replaced by a more flexible pintle-mounted one. A special camouflage paint distorts the tank's appearance in the visible and IR wavebands. The T-80U's 1A46 fire control system includes a laser range finder, a ballistics computer, and a more advanced 1G46 gunner's main sights, which greatly increases the T-80Us firepower over previous models. These new systems, together with the 125 mm D-81TM "Rapira-3" smooth bore gun, ensure that the T-80U can hit targets at a range of up to 5 kilometers (ATGMs and HV/APFSDS). An experienced crew at the international exhibition was able to successfully strike 52 targets without a miss at a distance of 5 km using guided rockets.

The T-80U(M) of the 1990s introduced the TO1-PO2 Agava gunner's thermal imaging sight and 9M119M Refleks-M guided missile, and later, an improved 2A46M-4 version of the 125 mm gun and 1G46M gunner's sight was used.

Russian tank production faltered in the years before and after the breakup of the Soviet Union. At the two remaining Russian tank plants, state orders all but ceased. Omsk, then the only Russian producer of the T-80, received orders for just five T-80Us in 1992. Around the same time, the Russian Ministry of Defense decided it would commit to eventually producing one tank type only. Though both Nizhni-Tagil's T-90 and Omsk's T-80U had their merits, the T-80 was notorious for its high fuel use and production cost. Also, Russian T-80BVs suffered appalling losses in their first combat use during the First Chechen War. T-90s, which were not deployed to Chechnya, were spared media criticism despite the similarly poor performance of the T-72 (the T-90's not-so-different ancestor) in the same conflict. In January 1996, Colonel General Aleksandr Galkin, chief of Main Armour Directorate of the Russian Ministry of Defense, said the Russian Armed Forces would phase out T-80 production in favor of the T-90 (Galkin reversed his position later that year, claiming the T-80U was a superior tank). Production of the T-80 at Omsk persisted until 2001, mainly for the export market. In September 2023, the CEO of Uralvagonzavod, Alexander Potapov, said that they had been tasked by the military to resume manufacture of the T-80. It is unknown how long the process of restarting the production line will take.

=== Ukrainian T-80UD ===
In parallel with the T-80U and Russia in general, the Morozov Bureau in Ukraine developed a diesel-powered version, the T-80UD. It is powered by the 1,000 hp 6TD-6-cylinder opposed-piston multi-fuel two-stroke turbo-piston diesel engine, ensuring high fuel efficiency and a long cruising range. The engine support systems make it possible to operate the tank at ambient temperatures of up to 55 °C and ford water obstacles 1.8 m in depth. The T-80UD shares most of the T-80U's improvements, but can be distinguished from it by a different engine deck and distinctive smoke-mortar array and turret stowage boxes. It retains the remotely-controlled commander's machine gun. About 500 T-80UD tanks were built in the Malyshev plant between 1987 and 1991. About 300 were still at the Ukrainian factory when the Soviet Union broke up, so the T-80UD tank was welcomed into Ukrainian military service, and therefore is more common in Ukrainian service than Russian. Unlike Russia, Ukraine has had much better success selling T-80s to foreign customers. Cyprus bought a number of T-80Us and T-80UKs from Russia for its army. Pakistan bought Ukrainian T-80UDs for the Pakistan Armoured Corps.

The Ukrainian T-84 main battle tank is based on the T-80UD. Ukraine was only able to afford a negligible number of T-84s for its own use, but did market the tank for export. The T-84 Oplot (first delivered in 2001) introduced turret-bustle ammunition storage; and to offer more sales to international market, the T-84-120 Yatagan has been offered for export, featuring a very large turret bustle and NATO-compatible 120 mm gun.

== Service history ==
=== Soviet Union ===
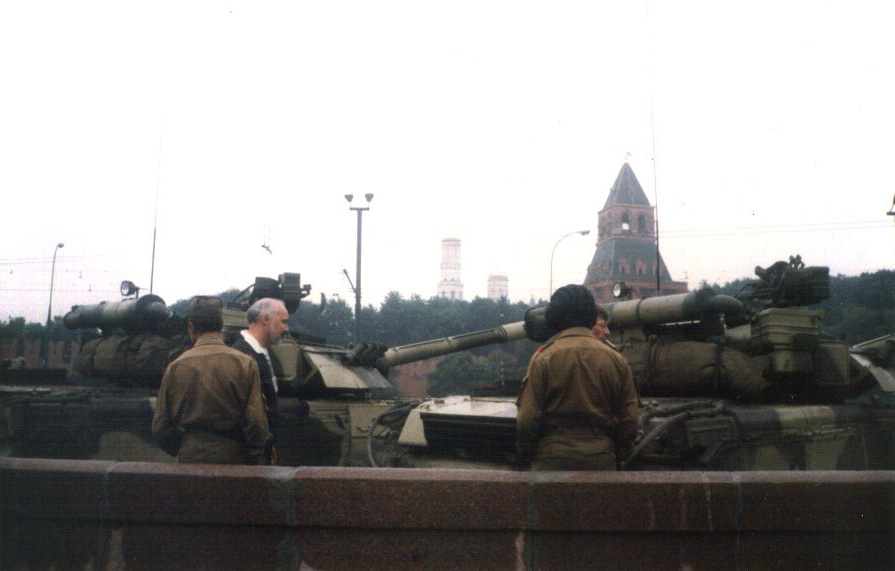
Two T-80UDs on the Red Square in Moscow during the failed August 1991 Soviet coup d'état attempt

In 1989, there were 3,000 T-80 MBTs overall. According to data published in Russia, 2,256 T-80s (up to the T-80BV model, as T-80Us were never deployed in Europe) were stationed with the Group of Soviet Forces in Germany in East Germany between 1986 and 1987. In 1991, when the Soviet Union was breaking up, the Soviet Army operated 4,839 T-80 MBTs of several different models.

In August 1991, communists and allied military commanders tried to overthrow Mikhail Gorbachev and regain control over the unstable Soviet Union. T-80UD tanks of the 4th Guards Kantemirovskaya Tank Division drove onto the streets of Moscow, but the Soviet coup attempt failed when the tank crews refused to attack the crowd or the parliament.

=== Russia ===
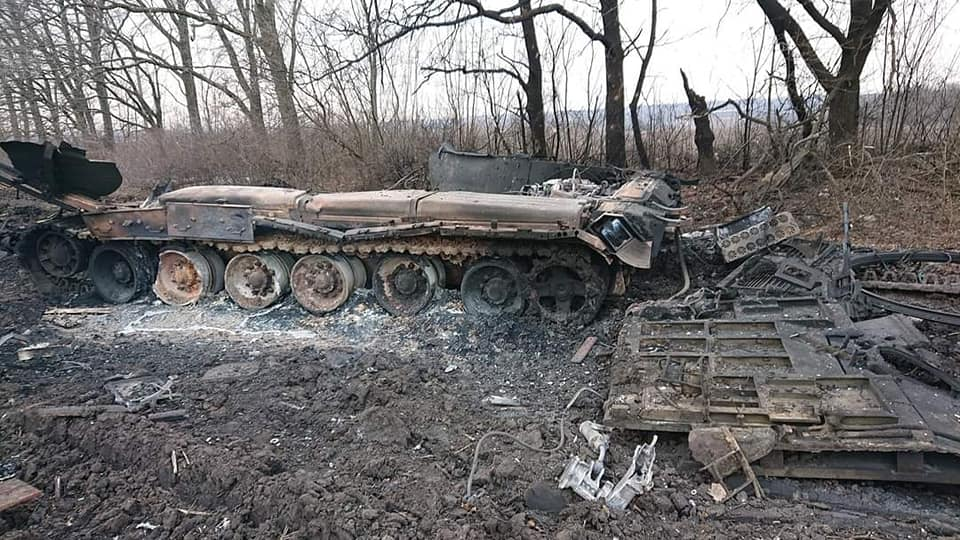
Russian T-80U tank destroyed by NLAW during the 2022 Russian invasion of Ukraine

Before the 2022 Russian invasion of Ukraine, the T-80 was not used in the way in which it was intended (large-scale conventional war in Europe). Until 2022, it was deployed amid the political and economic turmoil in Russia during the 1990s.

Most T-80 MBTs are possessed by Russia, though many were inherited by Ukraine, Belarus and Kazakhstan.

In 1995, the number of T-80 tanks increased to around 5,000 but shrank to 3,500 in 1998.

The Russian Army had 3,044 T-80s and variants in active service and 1,456 in reserve as of 2008. There are at least 460 T-80U in service with the 2nd Guards Tamanskaya Motor Rifle Division and 4th Guards Kantemirowsk Motor Rifle Division. A T-80BV is on display in Kubinka Tank Museum and a T-80U is on display at an open-air museum in Saratov. The T-80Us have recently been seen at arms expos in Russia such as VTTV.

During the 1993 Russian constitutional crisis, Boris Yeltsin ordered the use of tanks against the Supreme Soviet and the Congress of People's Deputies opposing him. On 4 October 1993, six T-80UDs from the 13th Guards Tank Regiment, 4th Guards Kantemirovskaya Tank Division took positions on a bridge opposite the Russian parliament building, and fired on it.

==== First Chechen War ====
Neither the T-80B nor the T-80BV were ever used in the Soviet–Afghan War in the 1980s in order to keep the tank's characteristics a secret, but they were first used during the First Chechen War. This first real combat experience for T-80 was unsuccessful, as the tanks were used to capture cities, a task for which they were not very well suited, in particular due to the low depression and elevation of the 2A46-M1 gun on all Russian MBTs.

The biggest tank losses were incurred during the ill-fated assault in the Battle of Grozny, which began in December 1994. During three months of combat, Russia lost 18 of the 84 T-80 tanks used by the 133rd and 3rd Tank Battalions. The forces chosen to capture Grozny were not prepared for such an operation, while the city was defended by, among others, former Soviet soldiers. Some T-80 tanks used in the assault lacked explosive reactive armour inserts.

Several tank-to-tank battles were recorded. During the fighting in late December 1994 and early January 1995, Russian T-80 tanks destroyed at least six rebel tanks. On the opposing side, one T-80 was disabled by a 125 mm shell. Another T-80 received three or four tank shell hits but remained in service. In August 1996, a T-80 destroyed one rebel tank.

The inexperienced crews had little knowledge of the layout of the city, while the tanks were attacked by rocket-propelled grenade teams hidden in cellars and on top of high buildings. The anti-tank fire was directed at the least armoured parts of the vehicles.

In the buildup of forces before the assault on Grozny, T-80s had been transferred from depots to units with little experience with the tank. When no auxiliary power unit is equipped, the T-80's gas turbine engines use almost as much fuel idling as when they are running. Most tank crews inadvertently exhausted their fuel this way on the day of the assault.

==== After the First Chechen War ====
The T-80 performed so poorly in the First Chechen War that after the conflict, General-Lieutenant Aleksandr Galkin, head of the Armour Directorate, convinced the Minister of Defence to never again procure tanks with gas turbine engines (Galkin reversed his position in 1996, claiming that the T-80U was superior to the T-90). After that, T-80 MBTs were never again used to capture cities, and instead, supported infantry squads from a safe distance. Defenders of the T-80 explain that the T-72 performed just as badly in urban fighting in Grozny as the T-80 and that there were two aggravating factors: after the breakup of the Soviet Union, poor funding meant no training for new Russian tank crews, and the tank force entering the city had no infantry support.

Russia did not deploy T-80 tanks in later conflicts such as the 1999 Second Chechen War, the 2008 Russo-Georgian War, or the post-2014 Russo-Ukrainian War until the full scale invasion in 2022.

==== Russian invasion of Ukraine ====
During the Russian invasion of Ukraine, Russian forces used T-80 tanks alongside T-72s and T-90s. Some were outfitted with improvised steel grilles on top of turrets, nicknamed "cope cages″ by Internet users. These were reportedly installed to counter top-attack munitions such as the FGM-148 Javelin and loitering munitions; later into the war the cages were left on and refitted onto more tanks after drone dropped munitions became increasingly prevalent on the battlefield.

According to the open source intelligence website Oryx, as of February 2026, at least 1,274 Russian T-80s of multiple variants have been visually confirmed as destroyed, damaged, abandoned, or captured. Of these, 4 are T-80Bs, 708 T-80BV, 5 T-80BVK, 137 T-80BV Obr. 2022, 105 T-80U, 2 T-80UK, 8 T-80UE-1, 1 T-80UM2, 150 T-80BVM, 103 T-80BVM Obr. 2022, and the remaining 51 are unknown variants. Conversely, 91 T-80BVs, 1 T-80UD and 2 unknown T-80s in service with the Armed Forces of Ukraine have been destroyed, damaged, or captured.

T-80 tanks were reportedly captured and modified by the Ukrainian military, resulting in the following vehicles:

- Ukrainian modernized T-80BV: A Ukrainian T-80BV modernization that gives the tank upgrades similar to the T-64BV zr.2017, the official designation of this variant is unknown.
- Azov Brigade T-80U: Two Russian T-80Us that were captured by Ukraine's Azov Brigade from the Russian 4th Guards Tank Division that underwent modifications to include improved protection. The changes included the installation of Ukrainian Nizh (Knife) explosive reactive armor. An anti-drone hood, nets under the turret, and a storage rack that also protects the engine deck from drones are all also parts of this modification. The vehicles are used by the 1st Company of the Azov Tank Battalion. They have no official name.

=== Exports ===
==== United Kingdom ====
In 1992, the United Kingdom bought a number of T-80U MBTs for defence research and development. They were not bought officially but through a specially created trading company, which was supposed to deliver them to Morocco. The price of $5 million offered for each tank ensured a lack of suspicion on the part of the Russians. The UK evaluated the tanks on its proving grounds and transferred one to the US where the Americans evaluated it at the Aberdeen Proving Ground. In January 1994, British Minister of State for Defence Procurement Jonathan Aitken confirmed in parliamentary debates that a Russian T-80U tank was imported for "defence research and development purposes".

==== South Korea ====
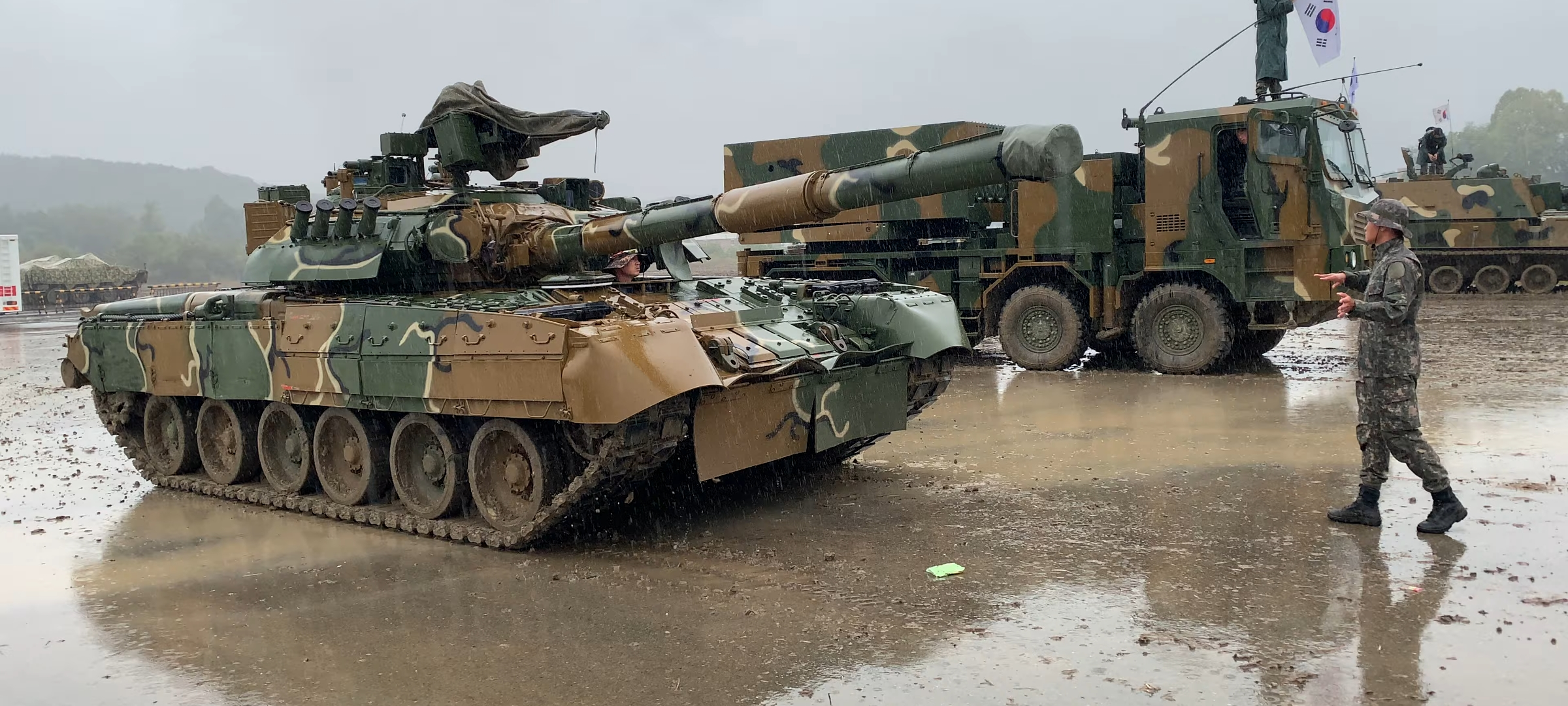
Republic of Korea Army T-80U

In 1991, South Korea lent $1.47 billion to the Soviet Union under the agreement to promote economic cooperation between the two nations. Russia originally agreed to repay the loan by 1999, but the Russian government requested a delay due to its own circumstances, which led the expected accumulated sum of principal and interest to near $3 billion. Therefore, South Korea launched Project Brown Bear to collect the debt by purchasing the Russian weapons at a 50% discounted price, with the other 50% covered by the Russian government.

As a result, South Korea purchased 33 T-80Us under Brown Bear I, six in 1996 and 27 in 1997, and two T-80Us under Brown Bear II in 2005. Although some domestic media claimed the acquisition of two T-80UKs instead of T-80Us, South Korean officials never confirmed this. They also denied Russian media claims of buying 140 T-80U and T-80UKs, calling it false information to promote a Russian defense exhibition.

When South Korea first acquired the T-80 in the late 1990s, it was the most powerful tank on the Korean Peninsula, superior to the domestic K1 88-Tank in having a larger 125 mm gun to the K1's 105 mm. However, as time went on, the K1 was upgraded into the K1A1 and the more advanced K2 Black Panther entered service, while the T-80 changed little since its delivery due to the foreign nature of the design and lack of will to add domestic upgrades. While the South Korean tanks use domestically manufactured ammunition, T-80 shells and most parts must be imported, increasing maintenance costs as the cost of ordering replacement parts kept rising steadily. Although the turbine engine is lighter with better acceleration, it uses more fuel and is less reliable. The interior has been criticized as cramped and gunnery was underperforming via less advanced sights and slower reload speed.

On 21 November 2024, South Korea used two T-80Us as experiments and destroyed them with various types of drone strikes, despite calls to transfer the weapons to Ukraine after they were invaded by Russia.

==== Pakistan ====
Ukrainian exports of the T-80UD have been moderately successful. In 1993 and 1995, Ukraine demonstrated the tank to Pakistan, which was looking for a new main battle tank. The tank was tested in Pakistan and in August 1996 Pakistan decided to buy 320 T-80UD tanks from Ukraine for $650 million in two variants: a standard Object 478B and export Object 478BE. The tanks were all supposed to be delivered in 1997. After the first batch of 15 vehicles had been shipped in February 1997, Russia protested that it held the rights to the tank and that Ukraine could not export it. Nearly 70% of T-80UD components were produced outside of Ukraine (mainly in Russia). Under the guise of keeping good relations with India, one of its most important military customers, Russia withheld 2A46-2 125 mm smoothbore guns, cast turrets and other technology, which forced Ukraine to make its tank industry independent. It developed domestic components, including a welded turret, which was in use on the new Ukrainian T-84. Ukraine was able to ship 20 more T-80UD tanks to Pakistan between February and May 1997. These 35 tanks were from Ukrainian Army stocks of 52 T-80UDs; they were built in the Malyshev plant several years before but were not delivered to their original destination. Their abilities were below the standard agreed by both Ukraine and Pakistan. The contract was completed by shipping another 285 Ukrainian T-80UD MBTs between 1997 and early 2002. These had the welded turret and other manufacturing features of the T-84.

==== Germany ====
While officially the Federal Republic of Germany never got to see any T-80s, the German Democratic Republic was a frequent host of Soviet divisions of T-80Bs. In 1985, the FRG "received" a T-80U, one of the most sophisticated versions of the T-80 family designed by the Soviets at the time, from a contact in Belarus. This was tested extensively to learn the secrets of the armour protection, optronics, fire control systems and the automatic loading mechanisms.

==== Cyprus ====
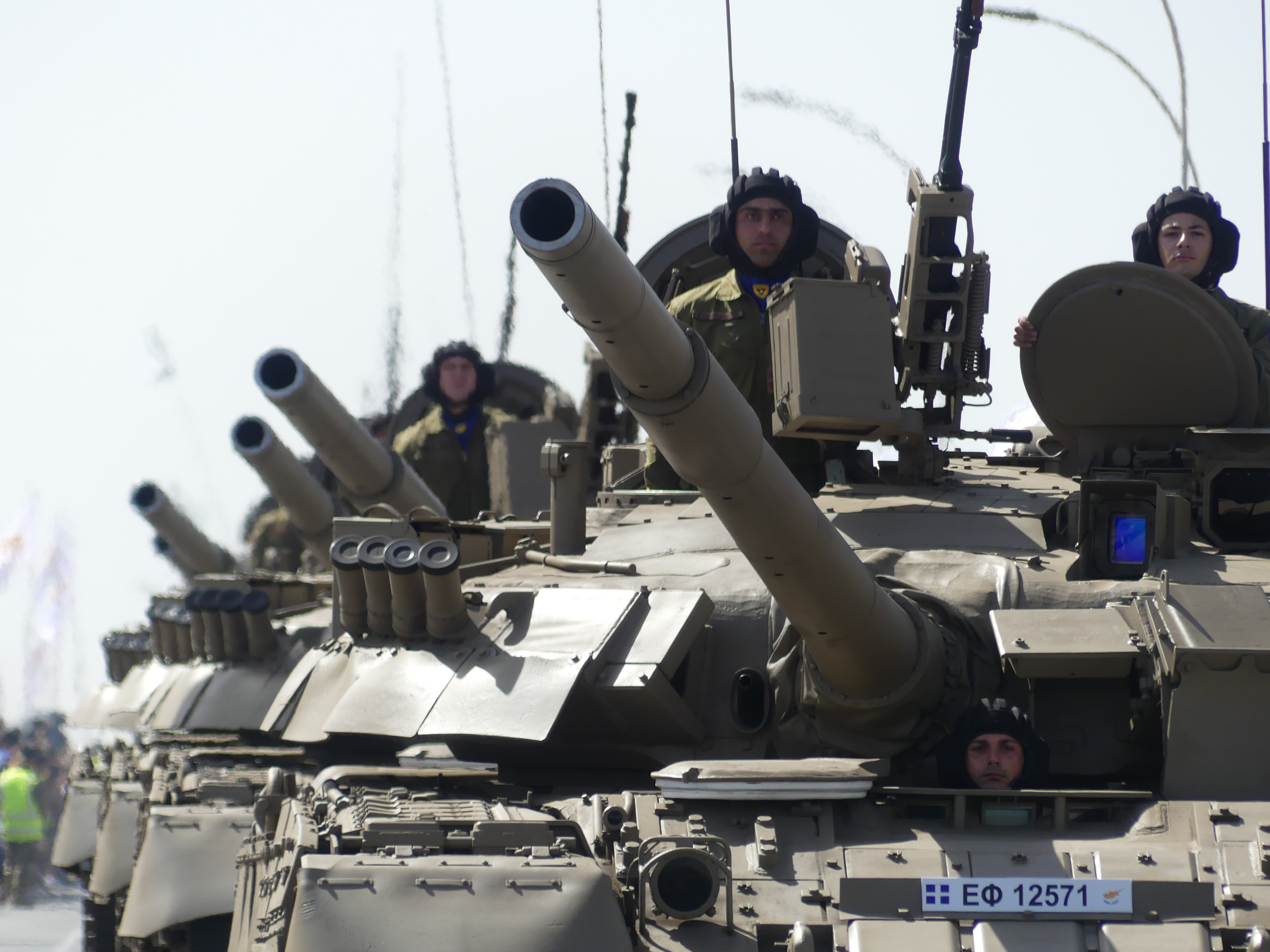
Cyprus National Guard T-80 main battle tanks during the 1 October parade in Nicosia.

Cyprus was the first foreign country to officially obtain T-80 tanks. Russia sold 27 T-80U and 14 T-80UK for $174 million to Cyprus in 1996. The tanks arrived in two batches. The first shipment consisted of 27 T-80U MBTs arriving in 1996, while the second batch of 14 T-80UK MBTs arrived in 1997. This significantly improved the abilities of Cypriot army armoured forces; their most potent tank until then was the AMX-30B2. New tanks gave the Cypriot National Guard the edge in a possible confrontation with the Turkish Army in Northern Cyprus. In October 2009 Cyprus ordered another batch of 41 used T-80Us and T-80UKs from Russia for €115 million. Deliveries were completed in the first half of 2011.

==== United States ====
The US government obtained one T-80U from the United Kingdom. It was evaluated at Eglin Air Force Base. In 2003, Ukraine transferred four T-80UD MBTs to the US.

==== Failed export attempts ====
Apart from Cyprus and the People's Republic of China, Russia has tried to export T-80 MBTs to Turkey and Greece, who were looking for new tanks. These two attempts have failed. Sweden regarded the T-80U as an alternative for its mechanized brigades in the early 1990s if the Leclerc would have been chosen for armoured brigades, but since the new upgraded Leopard 2 (Strv 122) was chosen, Leopard 2A4s (Strv 121) equipped the mechanized brigades as to simplify logistics.

== Description ==
The T-80 is similar in layout to the T-64; the driver's compartment is on the centre line at the front, the two-man turret is in the centre with the gunner on the left and the commander on the right, and the engine is rear mounted. Overall, its shape is also very similar to the T-64.

=== Mobility ===
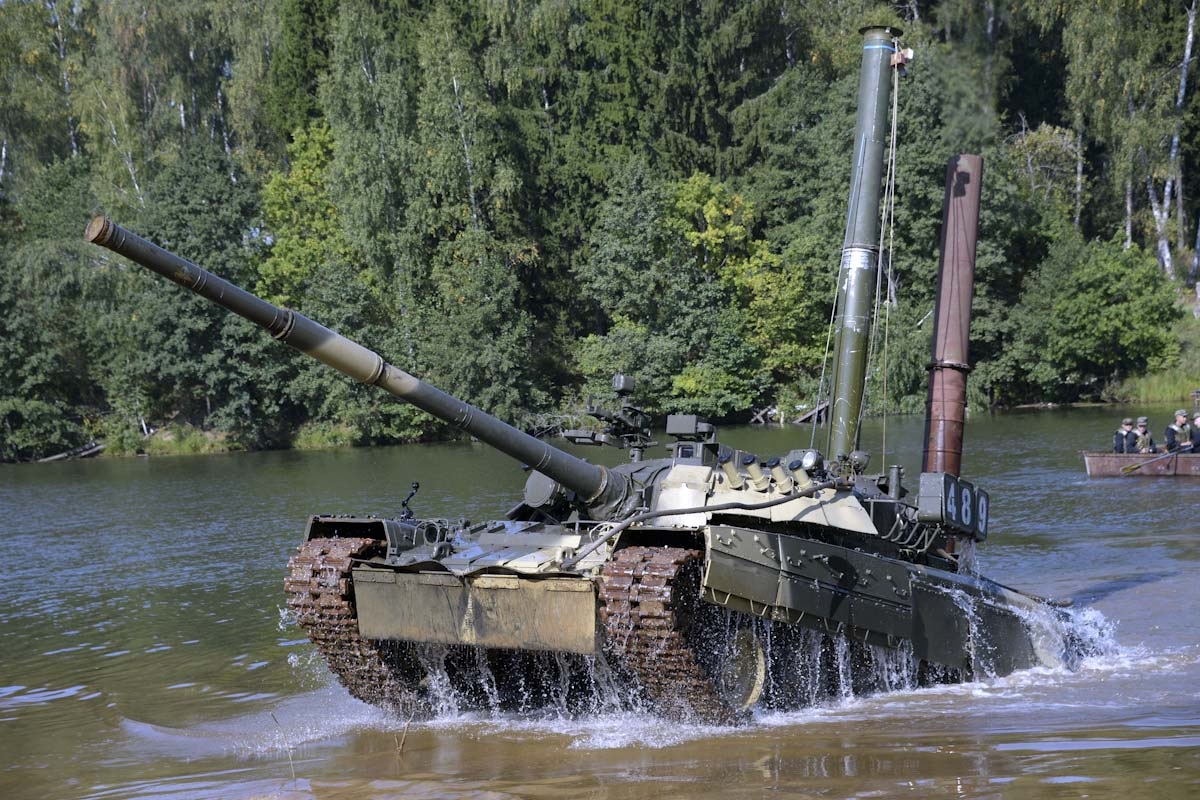
T-80U underwater driving exercise, 4th Guards Tank Division in 2018

The original T-80 design uses a 1,000 hp monobloc gas turbine engine instead of a 750-hp diesel engine of the T-64; later variants of the T-80 reverted to diesel engine usage. The gearbox is different, with five forward and one reverse gear, instead of seven forward and one reverse. Suspension reverts from pneumatic to torsion bar, with six forged steel-aluminium rubber-tyred road wheels on each side, with the tracks driven by rear sprockets. Later models such as the T-80U were equipped with 1250hp turbines.

The tracks are slightly wider and longer than on the T-64 giving lower ground pressure.

=== Armament ===
The turret houses the same 125 mm 2A46 smoothbore gun as the T-72, which can fire regular ordnance and anti-tank guided missiles.

The main gun is fed by the Korzina automatic loader. This holds up to 28 rounds of two-part ammunition in a carousel located under the turret floor. Further ammunition is stored in the turret. The ammunition comprises the projectile (APFSDS, HEAT, or HE-Frag), and the propellant charge, or the two-part missile. The autoloader in question has been in use since the mid-1960s. The propellant charge is held inside a semi-combustible cartridge case made of a highly flammable material, which is consumed in the breech during firing, except for a small metal baseplate.

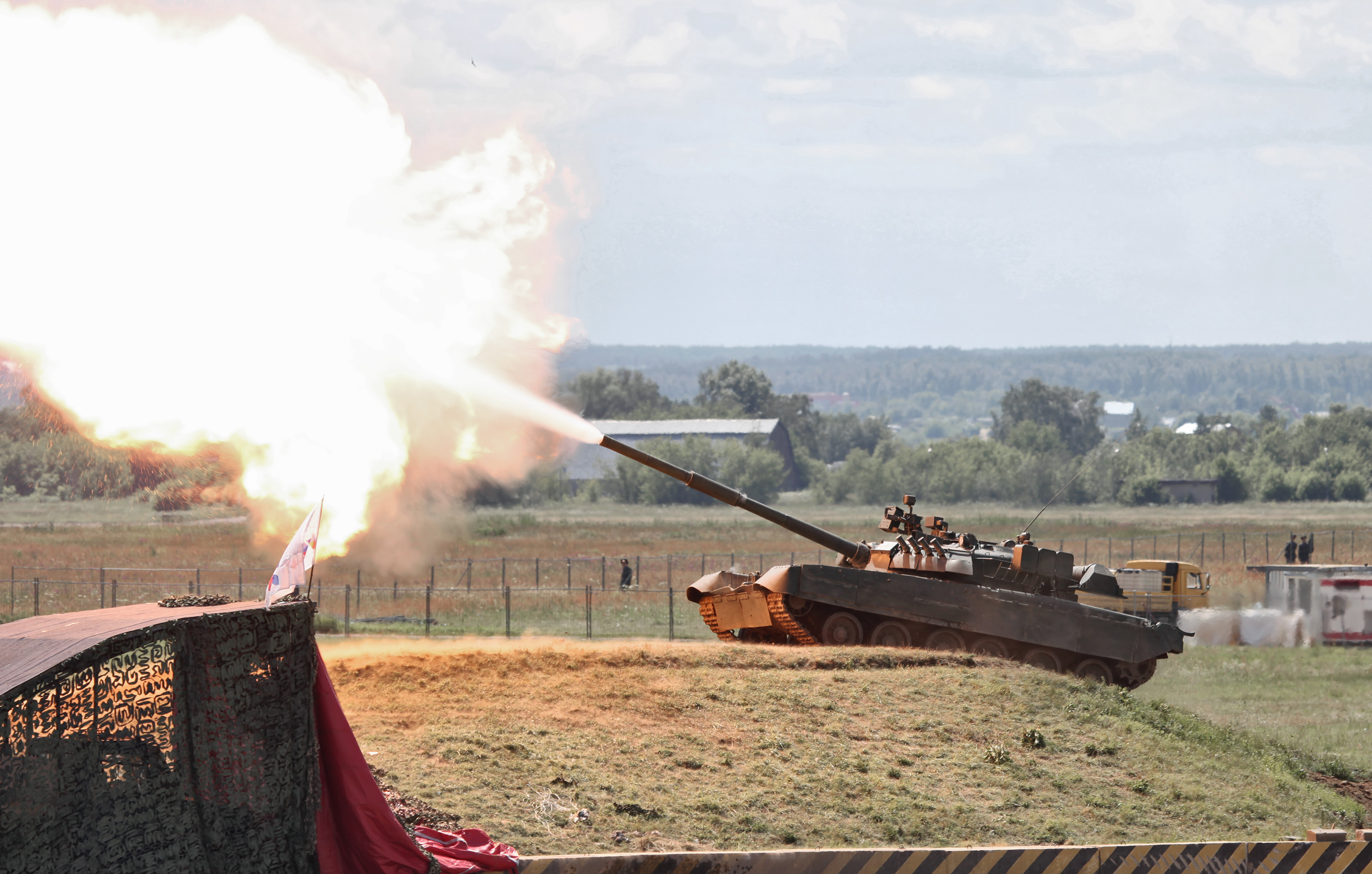
T-80U firing gun in 2012

The autoloader takes between 7.1 and 19.5 seconds to load the main weapon (28 rounds), depending on the initial position of autoloader carousel.

=== Armour ===
The glacis is of laminate armour and the turret is armoured steel, with cavities in the turret cheeks containing either a ceramic filling or non-explosive reactive armour elements.

The T-80's armour is composite on the turret and hull, while rubber flaps and sideskirts protect the sides and lower hull. Later T-80 models use explosive reactive armour (Kontakt-1, Kontakt-5 or Relikt) and stronger armour, like the T-80U and T-80UM1. Other protection systems include the Shtora-1 and Arena APS, and the discontinued Drozd APS.

A disadvantage highlighted during combat in Chechnya was the vulnerability of the T-80BV to catastrophic explosion thought to be caused by the vulnerability of stored semi-combustible propellant charges and missiles when contacted by the molten metal jet from the penetration of a HEAT warhead, causing the entire ammunition load to explode. The flaw is mostly related to the spare ammunition in the turret, outside of the autoloader. The autoloaders have some ballistic protection, but only hold roughly half of a T-80s ammunition. During the Chechen war 1994, the Russians were able to reduce their losses by having their tanks carry fewer rounds so that all the ammunition and propellant was stored in the autoloaders This vulnerability may be addressed in later models. When modern Western tank designs changed from non-combustible propellant cartridges to semi-combustible, they tended to separate ammunition stowage from the crew compartment with armoured blast doors, and provided "blow-out" panels to redirect the force and fire of exploding ammunition away from the crew compartment.

== Models ==
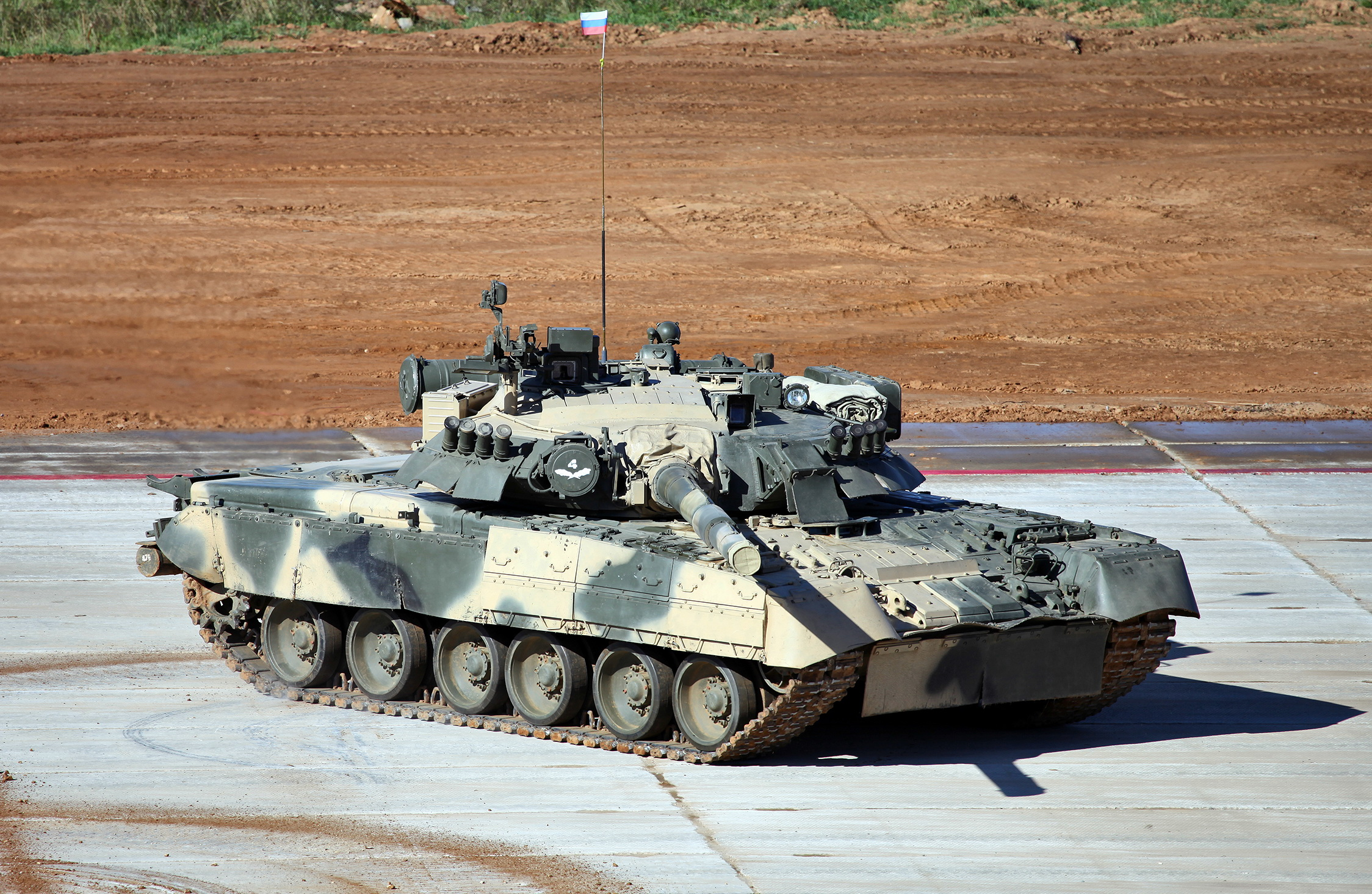
T-80U

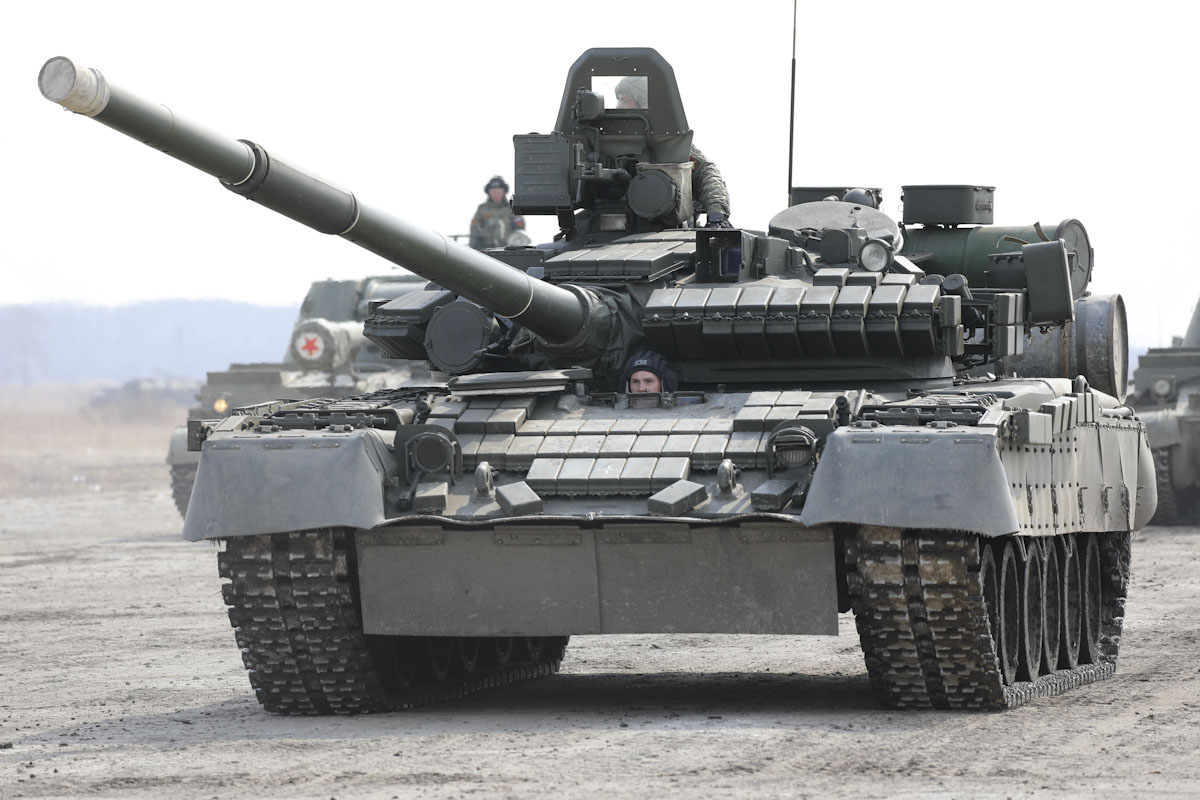
T-80BV

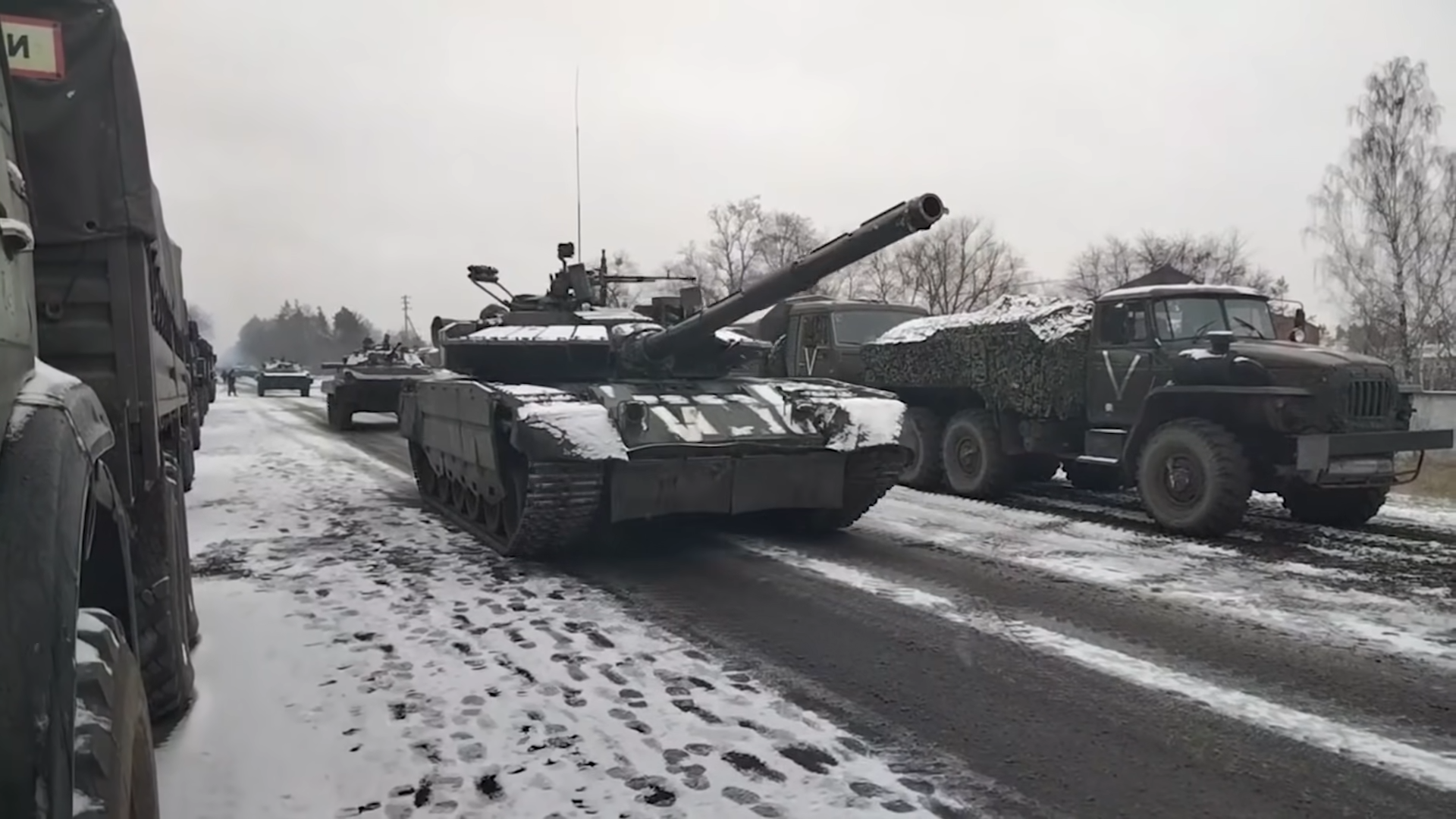
Russian T-80BVM during the invasion of Ukraine in March 2022

This section lists the main models of the T-80, built in the Soviet Union, Russia and Ukraine, with the dates they entered service.

Command tanks with more radio equipment have K added to their designation for komandirskiy ("command"), for example, T-80BK is the command version of the T-80B. Versions with reactive armour have V added, for vzryvnoy ("explosive"), for example T-80BV. Lower cost versions with no missile ability have a figure 1 added, as T-80B1.

- T-80 / Object 219 (1976): Initial model, with 1,000 hp gas turbine engine, coincidence rangefinder, and no missile capability. This model does not have fittings for explosive reactive armour. The turret is from the T-64A, and thus retains the use of the old coincidence rangefinder. Characteristics of this type are the V-shaped water deflector on the front glacis, coincidence rangefinder in front of the commander's cupola, and Luna searchlight mounted in the same position as a T-64. Around 250 were produced, as the tank's armour was essentially obsolete when introduced. Turret vs APFSDS – 380 mm, hull vs APFSDS – 500 mm (without reactive armour). This was, in effect, a pre-production model. It reportedly was fitted with an early version of the Shtora APS.
- T-80B / Object 219R (1978): This model had a new turret with improved composite armour, laser rangefinder, new fire-control system, new autoloader and missile launcher system capable of firing 9M112-1 Kobra antitank guided missile through the gun barrel. An improved, 1,100 hp, engine was added in 1980, a new gun in 1982. A night sight TPNZ-49 in active mode reached 1,300 m and a passive – 850 m.
- T-80BV (1985): T-80BV (model 1985) is a T-80B upgraded with Kontakt-1 ERA on turret and hull. Smoke discharges are re-positioned to make a room on the turret for ERA. There is a new gun 2A46M-1 with 9K112 Kobra system capable of firing improved 9M112M Kobra ATGM through gun barrel. T-80BV also introduced a new 5 part armour array on the hull unlike the old 3 part T-80B. T-80Bs were upgraded with appliqué armour 30mm high hardness steel plate to increase its protection to the same level.
- Object 219A: Early T-80U (Object 219AS) variant. It has the T-80U's turret, but not the Kontakt-5 ERA. Instead, it uses the old Kontakt-1/3 system; some 219As did not have ERA at all. Often misnamed T-80A.
- T-80U / Object 219AS (1985): Further development with a better turret, Kontakt-5 explosive reactive armour, improved gunner's sight. There is the same gun 2A46M-1 as on T-80BV but with a new 9K120 Svir system which allows firing 9M119 Svir ATGM. In 1990, a new 1,250 hp engine was installed. Overall protection with Kontakt-5 against APFSDS or HEAT is 780/1,320 mm RHAe. 9K119M with antitank guided missile 9M119M installed since 1990.
- T-80UD Bereza (1987): Ukrainian diesel version with 1,000 hp 6TD engine and remote-controlled antiaircraft machine gun.

- T-80UDK – T-80UD command tank. Prototype only.
- Object 478BK – T-80UD with a welded turret.
- Object 478DU – T-80UD with T-64 suspension. Testbed only. Was trialled by Ukraine & Pakistan.
- Object 478BEsbSB – T-80UD sold to Pakistan. Some out fitted with Buran Katherin Thermal vision devices for the gunner only. These kept the old cast turret.
- Object 478BEsb-1SB – T-80UD with welded turret from T-84 production line. Sold to Pakistan.
- Object 478DU-2 – Development of the T-80UD, that brought about a family of Ukrainian MBTs including T-84, T-84U, T-84 Oplot, and T-84 Yatagan models.

- T-80UK: Commander version equipped with Shtora-1 APS, thermal imaging night sight TO1-PO2T (detection range, target classification range = 6,400; 4,600 meters at night), new atmospheric parameter sensor, R-163U and R-163K radio stations, TNA-4 navigation system, HE shell remote detonation system, AB-1-P28 autonomous power plant. Adopted by the army in the 1990s.
- T-80UE: Export version similar to T-80UK version, with Shtora-1 APS and other improvements, no orders received.
- T-80UE-1: Not to be confused with the attempted export version T-80UE, this version is made by mating the T-80UD turret with the T-80BV hull (with some improvements to bring the hull to T-80U level, such as Kontakt-5 ERA.) Along with installation of PLISA thermal imaging sights, a new fire control system, and the more advanced and powerful 2A46M-4 125mm gun. The T-80UE-1 was adopted for service in 2005 and only a single battalion was ever equipped.
- T-80UM (1995): Russian version, with the new Buran thermal imaging sight in place of the Luna IR.
- Object 478BK (1995): Further Ukrainian development of T-80UD with 1,200 hp diesel and new welded turret.
- T-80UM-1 "Bars" (1997): Russian prototype with new Arena active protection system; bricks all around the turret visible on the outer side are Arena APS projectile casings, while Kontakt-5 ERA bricks lay behind them on the front part of the turret.
- T-80BVD (2002): KMDB's upgrade standard for Ukrainian T-80BVs. Changes include the 6TD diesel engine, remote-controlled commander's machine gun, and better optics. None were produced.
- T-80UM-2: Russian experimental prototype with the older Drozd active protection system. In 2022, the only known prototype was destroyed by Ukrainian forces some time in March. This has been visually confirmed via photos taken by Ukrainian soldiers as well as the 3rd party monitoring site, Oryx.
- Black Eagle or Object 640 (prototype, cancelled): Two Russian prototypes were shown at trade shows, with a longer chassis and extra pair of road wheels, and a very large turret with redesigned layout, separate ammunition compartment and new ERA array.
- T-80BVM (2017): A modernization package using older T-80BV tanks brought out of storage and upgrading their core systems.Features "Relikt" ERA, Irtysh fire control, Sosna-U gunner's sight (as on T-90A), an improved 125mm gun 2A46M-4, 9K119M Refleks-M missile system, upgraded gas turbine engine and upgrades of various other systems. The tank also has a new autoloader capable of firing the depleted uranium 3BM59 APFSDS shell and the tungsten 3BM60. A new contract for more 50 tanks upgrade was signed in August 2020 and a new one in August 2022. As of August 2024, deliveries are underway.

== Operators ==
=== Current ===
- Cyprus − 82 T-80Us in service as of 2025.
- Pakistan − 315 T-80UDs in service as of 2025.
- Russia − 250 T-80BV/U and 350 T-80BVM in service with the army and 30 T-80BV/BVM in service with the Marines as of 2026. Some more T-80 BV in service with the National Guard as of 2026. 20 T-80B/BV and 82 T-80U/UD in store. 30 T-80BV/U and 100 T-80BVMs in service with the Army and 100 T-80BV/BVM with the Marines as of 2024. In February 2024, the IISS estimated that a total of 4,000 MBTs including T-80B/BV/U tanks were in storage.
- Ukraine − 80+ T-80BV/BVM/U/UK in service with the Ground Forces and Marines as of 2024. Since the Russian invasion in 2022, the Ukrainians have pressed captured T-80 tanks into service with their armed forces.

=== Former ===
- Belarus − 92 in 2011. All were sold to Yemen and transferred between 2010 and 2012.
- Kazakhstan − 4-5 T-80Us were used for training in the military school of the city of Karaganda.
- Uzbekistan − Inherited an unknown number of T-80BVs.
- Soviet Union − 5,400 in service in 1991. All were passed on to successor states, including Russia.
- Wagner Group − Handed over to the Russian government in the aftermath of its failed rebellion.
- Yemen − 92 modernized T-80Bs purchased from Belarus in 2009, these vehicles were delivered between 2010 and 2012. No longer in service with internationally recognized government or the Houthis

=== Training role ===
- South Korea − 33 T-80Us used in "aggressor" training and test purposes only. Two T-80Us were destroyed during tests in November 2024. Received 33 T-80Us between 1996 and 1997 and 2 T-80Us in 2005 transferred as a partial payment of debts incurred during the Soviet era.

=== Evaluation-only ===
- Egypt – According to StrategyPage, 14 T-80UK and 20 T-80U were reportedly purchased in 1997, however other sources such as Janes, SIPRI, and the United Nations Register of Conventional Arms do not list any transfer of T-80s to Egypt. The IISS reports no T-80s in the Egyptian Army inventory
- United Kingdom - Obtained in 1992 for evaluation purposes.
- United States − Obtained 4 T-80s from Ukraine in 2003, these tanks arrived at the Aberdeen Proving Ground throughout December 2003 and January 2004.

=== Failed bids ===
- Greece – The T-80U took part in the tender for Greece, but lost against the Leopard 2A6.
- Malaysia – The T-80UD took part in the tender for the Malaysian Army, but lost against the PT-91M Pendekar.
- Sweden – Two T-80Us were trialed in Sweden in 1993–1994 as a potential secondary MBT for mechanized brigades, but lost against the Leopard 2A4. The T-80U was also known by its Swedish designation of Hotstrv VII ("Threat tank 7").
- Turkey – The T-80U took part in the tender for Turkey, but lost against the Leopard 2A4.

== See also ==
- List of main battle tanks by country
- List of main battle tanks by generation

== Notes ==
Notes

Citations
