= Nikolay Popov =

Russian designer (1931–2008)

- Born: Nikolay Sergeyevich Popov; 14 December 1931; Ust-Labinsk, North Caucasus Krai, RSFSR, Soviet Union
- Died: 4 February 2008 (aged 76); Sestroretsk, Saint Petersburg, Russia
- Occupation: Engineer
- Known for: Designing the T-80 tank

Nikolay Sergeyevich Popov (Russian: Николай Сергеевич Попов; 14 December 1931 – 4 February 2008) was a Soviet engineer who went on to be the main designer of the Soviet main battle tank, the T-80.

== Early life and career ==
Popov was born in Ust-Labinsk of the North Caucasus Krai.

His main contribution to Soviet military development came in 1976 when the first productions of the T-80 began. Popov was the main designer of the tank, and the T-80 ended up looking a lot like the previous T-64 and became the main battle tank of the Soviet Union due to its advanced design, being the first tank with a turbine, multi-fueled engine and still used by the Russian army today in its elite tank units, with over 5,404 being built until its production was terminated in 1992 by the new Russian Federation.

Popov died on 4 February 2008 in Sestroretsk.
